= Robert Lowery (actor) =

American actor (1913–1971)

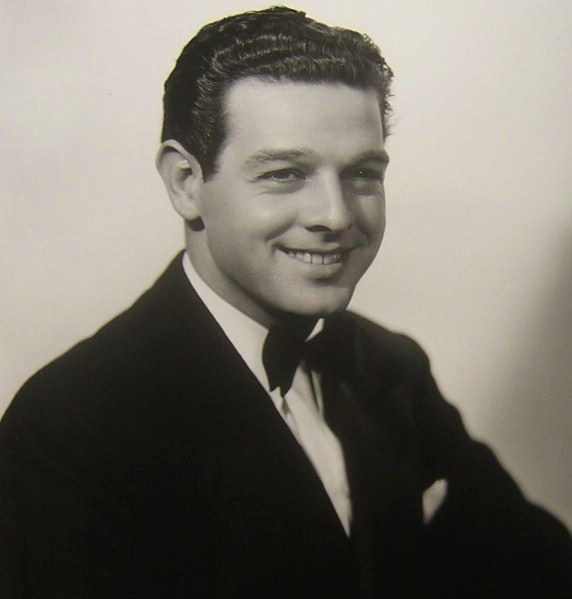
- Publicity photograph of Robert Lowery for Charlie Chan's Murder Cruise (1940)
- Born: Robert Lowery Hanks; October 17, 1913; Kansas City, Missouri, U.S.
- Died: December 26, 1971 (aged 58); Los Angeles, California, U.S.
- Other names: Bob Lowery; Bob Lowry
- Education: Paseo High School
- Occupation: Actor
- Years active: 1936–1967
- Known for: The Mark of Zorro; The Mummy's Ghost; Dangerous Passage; Batman and Robin; The Rise and Fall of Legs Diamond; Circus Boy
- Spouse(s): Vivan Wilcox (1941–1944) (divorced); Rusty Farrell (1947–1948) (divorced); Jean Parker (m. 1951); 1 child

Robert Lowery (born Robert Lowery Hanks, October 17, 1913 – December 26, 1971) was an American motion picture, television, and stage actor who appeared in more than 70 films. He was the second actor to play Batman, appearing as the character in the 1949 film serial Batman and Robin.

== Early life ==
Lowery was born in Kansas City, Missouri.

Syndicated newspaper columnist Harrison Carroll reported that Lowery was "a direct descendant of Nancy Hanks" (Lincoln).

He graduated from Paseo High School in Kansas City, and soon was invited to sing with the Slats Randall Orchestra.

== Career ==
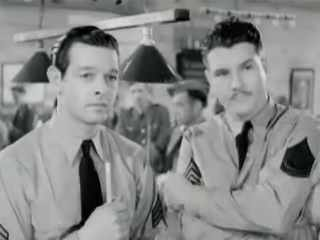
Lowery with George Reeves in the 1942 United States War Department Official Training Film No. 8-154, Sex Hygiene

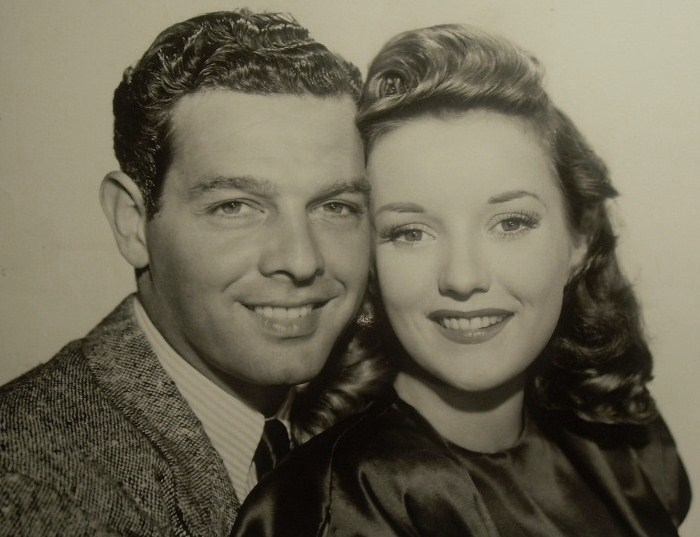
Lowery with Phyllis Brooks in High Powered (1945)

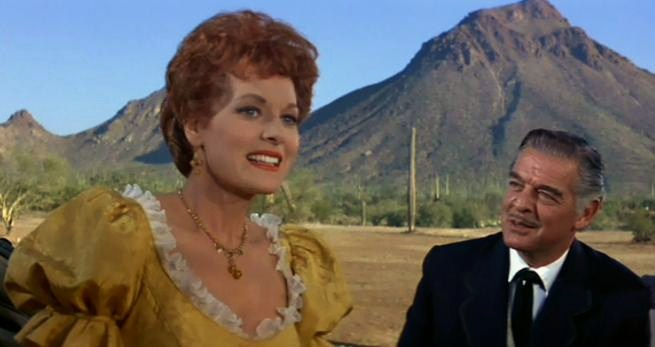
Maureen O'Hara and Lowery in McLintock! (1963)

Lowery debuted in motion pictures in Come and Get It (1936).

During his career, Lowery was primarily known for roles in action films such as The Mark of Zorro (1940), The Mummy's Ghost (1944), and Dangerous Passage (1944). He became the second actor to play DC Comics' Batman (succeeding Lewis Wilson), starring in a 1949's Batman and Robin serial.

Lowery also had roles in a number of Western films, including The Homesteaders (1953), The Parson and the Outlaw (1957), playing Gangster-mastermind Arnold Rothstein in The Rise and Fall of Legs Diamond (1960), Young Guns of Texas (1962), and Johnny Reno (1966). He was also a stage actor and appeared in Born Yesterday, The Caine Mutiny, and in several other productions.

On television, Lowery was best known for the role of Big Tim Champion on the series Circus Boy (1956–1957). In 1956, he guest starred in "The Deadly Rock," an episode of The Adventures of Superman (which was the first time a Batman actor shared screen time with a Superman actor, although Lowery and Reeves had appeared together in their presuperhero days in the 1942 World War II anti-VD propaganda film, Sex Hygiene.) Lowery also had guest roles on Perry Mason, featured as murder victim Amos Bryant in "The Case of the Roving River" and as Andrew Collis in "The Case of the Provocative Protégé", Playhouse 90 ("The Helen Morgan Story"), Hazel, Cowboy G-Men, as Foxy Smith on Maverick in the 1959 episode "Full House" starring James Garner with Joel Grey as Billy the Kid, Tales of Wells Fargo, Rawhide, 77 Sunset Strip, Hawaiian Eye, and Pistols 'n' Petticoats.

He made his last on-screen appearance in the 1967 comedy/Western film The Ballad of Josie, opposite Doris Day and Peter Graves.

== Personal life and death ==
He was married three times, to three actresses. Jean Parker and he had a son, Robert Lowery Hanks II, in 1952.

His other wives were Vivan Wilcox and Barbara "Rusty" Farrell, whom he married on March 21, 1947 in Las Vegas, Nevada.

Lowery died of heart failure at the age of 58 in his Los Angeles apartment on December 26, 1971.

== Filmography ==
Film
Year	Title	Role	Notes
1936	Come and Get It	Restaurant Patron	Uncredited
1936	Great Guy	Mr. Parker	Uncredited
1937	Wake Up and Live	Chauffeur	
1937	The Lady Escapes	Reporter	Uncredited
1937	You Can't Have Everything	Co-Pilot	Uncredited
1937	Wife, Doctor and Nurse	Intern	Uncredited
1937	Charlie Chan on Broadway	Reporter	Uncredited
1937	Hot Water		Uncredited
1937	Life Begins in College	Sling	
1937	Second Honeymoon	Reporter	Uncredited
1937	Big Town Girl	Elevator Boy	Uncredited
1938	City Girl	Greenleaf	Uncredited
1938	Happy Landing	Newspaper Reporter	Uncredited
1938	Walking Down Broadway	Delivery Man	Uncredited
1938	Rebecca of Sunnybrook Farm	Attendant	Uncredited
1938	Island in the Sky	Elevator Starter	Uncredited
1938	Four Men and a Prayer	Sailor	Uncredited
1938	A Trip to Paris	Bank Teller	Uncredited
1938	Kentucky Moonshine	Reporter	Uncredited
1938	Alexander's Ragtime Band	Reporter	Uncredited
1938	Safety in Numbers	Harry	
1938	One Wild Night	Bank Messenger	Uncredited
1938	Josette	Boatman Rufe	Uncredited
1938	Always Goodbye	Don Gordon	Uncredited
1938	Passport Husband	Ted Markson	
1938	Gateway	Reporter	Uncredited
1938	Keep Smiling	Man at Auction	Uncredited
1938	Straight, Place and Show	Bob	Uncredited
1938	Submarine Patrol	Sparks	
1938	Kentucky	Sally's Partner	Uncredited
1939	Tail Spin	Sam	Uncredited
1939	Wife, Husband and Friend	Interne	Uncredited
1939	Everybody's Baby	B. Wilson	Uncredited
1939	Mr. Moto in Danger Island	Lt. George Bently	
1939	Young Mr. Lincoln	Juror Bill Killian	Uncredited
1939	Charlie Chan in Reno	Wally Burke	
1939	Second Fiddle	Orchestra Leader	Uncredited
1939	Here I Am a Stranger	Minor Role	Uncredited
1939	The Escape	Ambulance Driver	Uncredited
1939	Hollywood Cavalcade	Henry Potter	
1939	Drums Along the Mohawk	John Weaver	
1939	Day-Time Wife	Flirty Architect	Uncredited
1940	City of Chance	Ted Blaine	
1940	Free, Blonde and 21	Dr. Stephen Craig	
1940	Star Dust	Bellboy	
1940	Shooting High	Bob Merritt	
1940	Charlie Chan's Murder Cruise	Dick Kenyon	
1940	Four Sons	Joseph	
1940	Maryland	Tom Bolton	Uncredited
1940	The Mark of Zorro	Rodrigo	
1940	Murder Over New York	David Elliot	
1941	Ride on Vaquero	Carlos Martinez	
1941	Private Nurse	Henry Holt	
1941	Great Guns		Uncredited
1941	Cadet Girl	Cadet Walton	
1941	Remember the Day	Hotel P.A. Announcer	Uncredited
1942	Who Is Hope Schuyler?	Robert Scott	
1942	My Gal Sal	Sally's Friend	Uncredited
1942	She's in the Army	Navy Lt. Jim Russell	
1942	Lure of the Islands	Wally	
1942	Criminal Investigator	Bob Martin	
1942	Rhythm Parade	Jimmy Trent	
1942	Dawn on the Great Divide	Terry Wallace	
1943	So's Your Uncle	Roger Bright	
1943	Revenge of the Zombies	Larry Adams	
1943	A Scream in the Dark	Mike Brooker	
1943	The North Star	Gunner	
1943	Campus Rhythm	Buzz O'Hara	
1943	Tarzan's Desert Mystery	Prince Selim	
1943	December 7th: The Movie	Pvt. Joseph L. Lockhart	Uncredited
1944	The Navy Way	Johnny Zumano	
1944	Hot Rhythm	Jimmy O'Brien	
1944	The Mummy's Ghost	Tom Hervey	
1944	Dark Mountain	Don Bradley	
1944	Mystery of the River Boat	Steve Langtry	
1944	Dangerous Passage	Joe Beck	
1945	High Powered	Tim Scott	
1945	Fashion Model	Jimmy O'Brien	
1945	The Monster and the Ape	Ken Morgan	
1945	Road to Alcatraz	John Norton	
1945	Sensation Hunters	Danny Burke	
1945	Prison Ship	Tom Jeffries	
1946	God's Country	Lee Preston / Leland Bruce	
1946	House of Horrors	Steven Morrow	
1946	They Made Me a Killer	Tom Durling	
1946	Death Valley	Steve	
1946	Big Town	Pete Ryan	
1946	Gas House Kids	Eddie O'Brien	
1946	Lady Chaser	Peter Kane	
1947	Queen of the Amazons	Gary Lambert	
1947	I Cover Big Town	Pete Ryan	
1947	Danger Street	Larry Burke	
1947	Jungle Flight	Kelly Jordon	
1947	Killer at Large	Paul Kimberly	
1948	Mary Lou	Steve Roberts	
1948	Heart of Virginia	Dan Lockwood	
1948	Shep Come Home	Mark Folger	
1948	Highway 13	Hank Wilson	
1949	Batman and Robin	Bruce Wayne / Batman	Serial
1949	Arson, Inc.	Joe Martin	
1949	The Dalton Gang	Blackie Dalton / Blackie Mullet	
1949	Call of the Forest	Sam Harrison	
1950	Western Pacific Agent	Bill Stuart	
1950	I Shot Billy the Kid	Sheriff Pat Garrett	
1950	Gunfire	Sheriff John Kelly	
1950	Train to Tombstone	Marshall Staley	
1950	Border Rangers	Mungo	
1951	Crosswinds	Nick Brandon	
1953	Jalopy	Skid Wilson	
1953	The Homesteaders	Clyde Moss	
1953	Cow Country	Harry O'Dell	
1955	Lay That Rifle Down	Nick Stokes/Poindexter March, III	
1955	Two-Gun Lady	"Big Mike" Doughterty	
1957	The Parson and the Outlaw	Col. Jefferson Morgan	
1960	The Rise and Fall of Legs Diamond	Arnold Rothstein	
1962	Deadly Duo	Jay Flagg	
1962	When the Girls Take Over	Maximo Toro	
1962	Young Guns of Texas	Jesse Glendenning	
1963	McLintock!	Gov. Cuthbert H. Humphrey	
1964	Stage to Thunder Rock	Deputy Sheriff Seth Barrington	
1965	Zebra in the Kitchen	Preston Heston	
1966	Johnny Reno	Jake Reed	
1966	Waco	Mayor Ned Wood	
1966	The Undertaker and His Pals	Customer	
1967	The Ballad of Josie	Whit Minick	
Television
Year	Title	Role	Notes
1954	The Joe Palooka Story	Don Jackson	1 episode
1954	The Pepsi-Cola Playhouse	George Loring	1 episode
1955	Letter to Loretta	Gordy	1 episode
1956	The Millionaire	David Hanley	1 episode
1956–1957	Circus Boy	Big Tim Champion	49 episodes
1958	Casey Jones	Greg Pontus	1 episode
1958	Tales of Wells Fargo	Major Dennis Keel	Episode: "Special Delivery"
1958	Maverick	Paul Asher	Episode: "Burial Ground of the Gods"
1958	Yancy Derringer	Blair Devon	2 episodes
1959	Cimarron City	Harris	1 episode
1959	Maverick	Foxy Smith	Episode: "Full House"
1959	The Texan	Coy Bennet	1 episode
1959	Rawhide	Major Sinclair	Episode: "Incident of the Wanted Painter"
1959	Bronco	Mike Kirk	1 episode
1960	Richard Diamond, Private Detective	Mark Sutro	1 episode
1960	Cheyenne	Giff Murdock / Richard Scott	Episode: "Counterfeit Gun"
1960	Hotel de Paree	Trent	1 episode
1960	Coronado 9	Miller	1 episode
1961	Whispering Smith	Dave Markson	1 episode
1961	Rawhide	Captain Holloway	Episode: "The Captain's Wife"
1962	Frontier Circus	Marshal Taggert	1 episode
1962	Gunsmoke	Idaho Smith	1 episode
1962	Hazel	Pablo Rivera	1 episode
