= Rainbow Over Broadway =

1933 film by Richard Thorpe

- Directed by: Richard Thorpe
- Written by: Carol Webster; Winifred Dunn
- Produced by: George R. Batcheller
- Starring: Joan Marsh; Frank Albertson; Lucien Littlefield
- Cinematography: M.A. Anderson
- Edited by: Roland D. Reed
- Production company: Chesterfield Pictures
- Distributed by: Chesterfield Pictures
- Release date: December 1, 1933
- Running time: 72 minutes
- Country: United States
- Language: English

Rainbow Over Broadway is a 1933 American pre-Code musical drama film directed by Richard Thorpe and starring Joan Marsh, Frank Albertson and Lucien Littlefield. The film's sets were designed by the art director Edward C. Jewell.

== Cast ==
- Joan Marsh as Judy Chibbins
- Frank Albertson as Don Hayes
- Lucien Littlefield as Timothy Chibbins
- Grace Hayes as Trixie Valleron
- Gladys Blake as Nellie Valleron
- Glen Boles as Mickey Chibbins
- Dell Henderson as Bowers
- Nat Carr as Sanfield
- Harry Myers as Berwiskey
- May Beatty as Queenie
- George Grandee as Bob
- Aline Goodwin as Chorus Girl
- Maxine Lewis as Chorus Girl

== Bibliography ==
- Bradley, Edwin M. Unsung Hollywood Musicals of the Golden Era: 50 Overlooked Films and Their Stars, 1929-1939. McFarland, 2016.
