= Marjorie Weaver =

American actress (1913–1994)

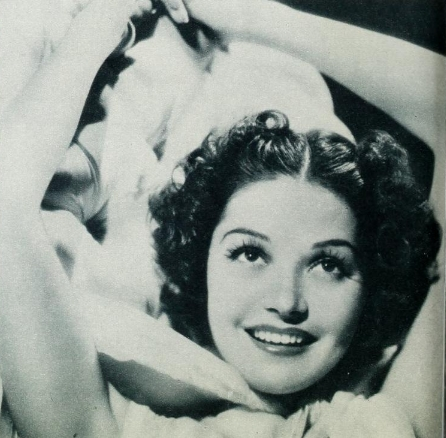
- Weaver as she was pictured in Photoplay magazine's August 1938 issue.
- Born: March 2, 1913; Crossville, Tennessee, U.S.
- Died: October 1, 1994 (aged 81); Austin, Texas, U.S.
- Education: University of Kentucky; Indiana University Bloomington
- Occupation: Film actress
- Years active: 1934–1952
- Known for: Young Mr. Lincoln; Michael Shayne, Private Detective; Charlie Chan's Murder Cruise; Second Honeymoon; Murder Over New York; The Californian

Marjorie Weaver (March 2, 1913 – October 1, 1994) was an American film actress of the 1930s through the early 1950s.

== Early life, entrance into acting ==
Weaver was born in Crossville, Tennessee, to John Thomas Weaver and his wife, Ellen (née Martin). Her father was a general freight agent for a railroad in Louisville, Kentucky. She attended the University of Kentucky, and later Indiana University Bloomington, with interests in music and won beauty contests at both schools.

Weaver began her acting career as a stage actress in the early 1930s, and also worked as a model during that period, as well as a singer. She received her first film role, uncredited, in 1934. From 1936 through 1945 she received steady acting roles. She began receiving credited roles in larger productions, and starred opposite Ricardo Cortez in the 1937 film The Californian, and that same year she starred opposite Tyrone Power in Second Honeymoon.

== Peak years ==
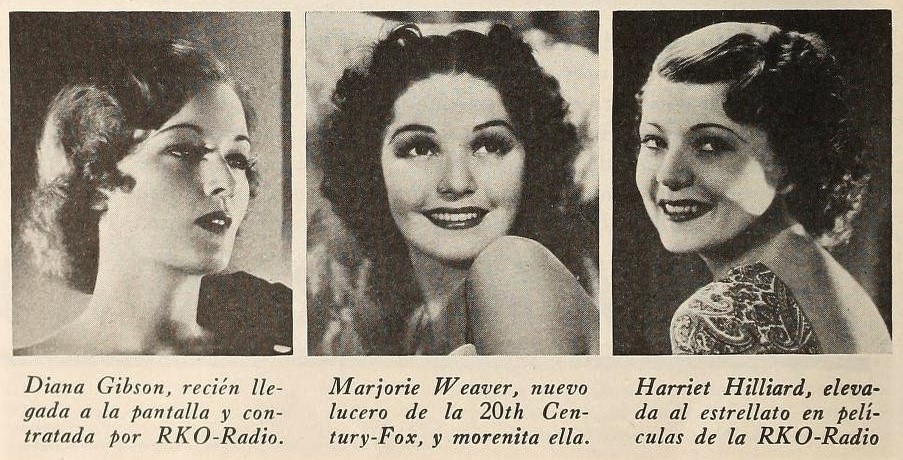
Diana Gibson, Weaver, and Harriet Hilliard (1937)

From 1938 through 1945 she had twenty seven starring roles in films, some of which were B movies. The most notable film role was playing Mary Todd Lincoln in Young Mr. Lincoln (1939), which also starred Henry Fonda and Alice Brady. Some of her more recognizable roles from that seven-year period included a role in the Michael Shayne mystery series opposite Lloyd Nolan, and her role in Charlie Chan's Murder Cruise. In 1945, she starred opposite Robert Lowery in Fashion Model, which was her last role of any consequence. She had four minor roles in 1952, after which she retired from acting.

== Later life ==
On 22 October 1937, in Goshen, Indiana, she married naval officer Kenneth George Schacht. She divorced him in 1941, after having seen each other only 16 days over their four-year marriage. Schacht had been captured by the Japanese, and the Navy had notified her that he was dead. She later married Don Briggs, a businessman, and had two children with him. She died on 1 October 1994 in Austin, Texas.

== Partial filmography ==
- China Clipper (1936) – Secretary
- Here Comes Carter (1936) – Bronson's Secretary (uncredited)
- Polo Joe (1936) – Girl at Polo Field (uncredited)
- Gold Diggers of 1937 (1936) – Chorus Girl (uncredited)
- King of Burlesque (1936)
- On the Avenue (1937) – Chorus Girl (uncredited)
- Melody for Two (1937) – Switchboard Operator (uncredited)
- This Is My Affair (1937) – Miss Blackburn
- The Jones Family in Big Business (1937) – Vicky
- The Californian (1937) – Rosalia Miller
- Hot Water (1937) – Vicki Enfield
- Life Begins in College (1937) – Miss Murphy
- Ali Baba Goes to Town (1937) – Harem Girl (uncredited)
- Second Honeymoon (1937) – Joy
- Sally, Irene and Mary (1938) – Mary Stevens
- Kentucky Moonshine (1938) – Caroline
- Three Blind Mice (1938) – Moira Charters
- I'll Give a Million (1938) – Jean Hofmann
- Hold That Co-ed (1938) – Marjorie
- Young Mr. Lincoln (1939) – Mary Todd
- Chicken Wagon Family (1939) – Cecile Fippany
- The Honeymoon's Over (1939) – Betty Stewart Todd
- The Cisco Kid and the Lady (1939) – Julie Lawson
- Shooting High (1940) – Marjorie Pritchard
- Charlie Chan's Murder Cruise (1940) – Paula Drake
- Maryland (1940) – Georgie Tomlin
- Murder Over New York (1940) – Patricia Shaw
- Michael Shayne, Private Detective (1940) – Phyllis Brighton
- Murder Among Friends (1941) – Mary Lou Packard
- For Beauty's Sake (1941) – Dime Pringle
- Man at Large (1941) – Dallas Davis
- The Man Who Wouldn't Die (1942) – Catherine Wolff
- The Mad Martindales (1942) – Evelyn Martindale
- Just Off Broadway (1942) – Judy Taylor
- Let's Face It (1943) – Jean Blanchard
- You Can't Ration Love (1944) – Marian Douglas
- The Great Alaskan Mystery (1944, Serial) – Ruth Miller
- Pardon My Rhythm (1944) – Dixie Moore
- Shadow of Suspicion (1944) – Claire Winter
- Leave It to Blondie (1945) – Rita Rogers
- Fashion Model (1945) – Peggy Rooney
- Hollywood Victory Caravan (film) (1945) - Herself
- We're Not Married! (1952) – Ruthie (uncredited)
