= Ladies in Love =

1936 film by Edward H. Griffith

- Film poster
- Directed by: Edward H. Griffith
- Written by: Melville Baker; Ladislaus Bus-Fekete; Paul Gerard Smith
- Produced by: Buddy G. DeSylva; Darryl F. Zanuck
- Starring: Janet Gaynor; Constance Bennett; Loretta Young
- Cinematography: Hal Mohr
- Edited by: Ralph Dietrich
- Music by: David Buttolph; Cyril J. Mockridge; Louis Silvers
- Production company: Twentieth Century-Fox
- Distributed by: Twentieth Century-Fox
- Release date: October 29, 1936
- Running time: 97 minutes
- Country: United States
- Language: English

Ladies in Love is a 1936 American romantic comedy film based upon the play by Ladislaus Bus-Fekete. It was directed by Edward H. Griffith and stars Janet Gaynor, Constance Bennett and Loretta Young. The film revolves around three roommates (Gaynor, Bennett, and Young) in exotic Budapest and their comical romantic adventures. Gaynor, Bennett, and Young were billed above the title, with Gaynor receiving top billing. The movie also featured Simone Simon, Don Ameche, Paul Lukas, and Tyrone Power.

Supporting player Simone Simon co-starred with James Stewart the following year in Seventh Heaven, a remake of the 1927 film of the same name, playing one of Janet Gaynor's greatest roles from the silent era.

Tyrone Power and Loretta Young made such an impact in this movie that they were quickly paired by the studio in several more films, including Love Is News (1937), Cafe Metropole (1937), Second Honeymoon (1937), and Suez (1938).

Constance Bennett is generally acknowledged by critics as having the best role in the film, but her career went into a steep decline within a few years. Top-billed Janet Gaynor elected to leave films a couple of years later while still at her height, shortly after A Star Is Born and The Young in Heart, in order to travel with her husband, Hollywood costume designer Adrian.

== Plot ==
Three women move in together in Budapest: Martha, a necktie salesperson and part time bunny-feeder for Dr. Rudi Imre; Yoli, a callous denier of love; and Susie, a dancer and hopeless romantic. Martha suggests they perform a ritual she heard about in which they count the corners of a room, sit down, and make a wish. The women each wish for different things. Susie wishes to "be independent of men", Yoli for "a rich husband", and Martha for "a good home, a man, and maybe children."

Two men visit the women's new place. Yoli's love interest, John Barta, and Susie's love interest, Karl Lanyi. Susie falls head over heels for the man she just met and Yoli pretends to have no feelings toward the man she already knows. Susie confesses her love to him shortly thereafter and runs away before he can respond.

Then Susie has to perform a dance before a magic show. Martha asks Susie to introduce her to the magician, Sandor, in hopes she can sell some of her ties to him. The magician dismisses her, saying she must wait until after the show to get an autograph. Susie performs and then the magician goes on stage and asks for a volunteer. He spots Martha in the crowd and invites her up. She brings along her case of neckties to keep it safe. The magician plays many disappearing tricks on her case and some of the ties. Then, he pays her for the ties, only to magically take the money back from her. Later, the magician is struggling with his shirt and calling out for an assistant whom he fired. Martha is there to help, and she suggests she take over as his new assistant. However, things do not work out because the magician wrongfully assumes Martha is in love with him and kisses her. She quits and runs away.

Yoli's man, whom she claims to not love, falls in love with a very young woman, Marie. He could not love Yoli because he does not believe her when she tells him she loves him because she had pretended to be callous for so long.

Susie is eventually rejected by the man she loves and learns he is marrying another woman. One night she gets drunk and decides to end her misery by poisoning herself. Martha accidentally drinks the poison. The women call the doctor Martha was feeding bunnies for/kind of dating, and they are able to save her. Martha and the doctor end up together.

The women move on with their lives and out of the apartment.

== Cast ==
- Janet Gaynor as Martha Kerenye
- Constance Bennett as Yoli Haydn
- Loretta Young as Susie Schmidt
- Simone Simon as Marie Armand
- Don Ameche as Rudi Imre
- Paul Lukas as John Barta
- Tyrone Power as Karl Lanyi
- Alan Mowbray as Paul Sandor
- Wilfrid Lawson as Ben Horvath
- J. Edward Bromberg as Franz Brenner
- Virginia Field as Helena Grabitz

== Reception ==
The New York Times critic Frank Nugent wrote, "Love and Love alone is the theme of the Ladislaus Bus-Fekete play on which Twentieth Century has based its picture, and love and love again is the dimpled puppet-master controlling the destinies of the film's four (4) leading ladies...Edward direction has been smooth and the entire production has a satiny texture. It is still a woman's film"

According to the Chicago Daily Tribune review, "The feminine element are glamorously portrayed by their four capable delineators. Loretta Young and Simone Simon ring true. Janet Gaynor does at times. Constance Bennett is believable in her snooty moments, but quite the reverse when she essays sincerity"
