= Easy to Look At =

- Theatrical release poster
- Directed by: Ford Beebe
- Screenplay by: Henry Blankfort
- Produced by: Henry Blankfort
- Starring: Gloria Jean; Kirby Grant; J. Edward Bromberg; Eric Blore; George Dolenz; Mildred Law
- Cinematography: Jerome Ash
- Edited by: Saul A. Goodkind
- Production company: Universal Pictures
- Distributed by: Universal Pictures
- Release date: August 10, 1945
- Running time: 65 minutes
- Country: United States
- Language: English

Easy to Look At is a 1945 American comedy film directed by Ford Beebe and written by Henry Blankfort. The film stars Gloria Jean, Kirby Grant, J. Edward Bromberg, Eric Blore, George Dolenz, and Mildred Law. The film was released on August 10, 1945, by Universal Pictures.

== Plot ==
Aspiring fashion designer Judy Dawson arrives in New York and befriends Gustave Levant, once a great designer himself at the House of Tyler, but now Tyler's humble night watchman. Levant asks his boss Bruce Tyler to hire Judy, who has her own ambitious ideas. Without permission, she redesigns and alters a gown intended for an important Broadway star. Levant, fearing the consequences, takes the blame for the "sabotage." Further clouding Judy's career, one of Tyler's competitors buys the prototype sketch of the redesigned gown, and now Judy is accused of industrial theft. The budding romance between Judy and Bruce turns stormy, until Levant arranges to bring them together on opening night, when Judy's Broadway creations are shown publicly.

== Cast ==
- Gloria Jean as Judy
- Kirby Grant as Tyler
- J. Edward Bromberg as Gustave
- Eric Blore as Butch Billings
- George Dolenz as Antonio
- Mildred Law as Helene Ford
- Leon Belasco as Phillipe
- Maurice Cass as Woolens
- The Delta Rhythm Boys as Themselves
- The Lyttle Sisters as Themselves
- Terry as Toto (uncredited) (final film role)

== Production ==
Gloria Jean, singing star for Universal since 1939, was persuaded by her agent Eddie Sherman—who also handled the studio's biggest stars Abbott and Costello—not to renew her contract. Sherman planned a nationwide tour of personal appearances, and informed Universal that Gloria Jean would be leaving the studio at the end of 1944. Universal had already promised exhibitors three more Gloria Jean features for 1945, so studio executives worked the actress constantly until her contract expired and the three promised features were filmed. Easy to Look At was the last of them, rushed through production by members of Universal's serial squad: director Ford Beebe, cameraman Jerry Ash, and editor Saul Goodkind. The feature was filmed in December 1944 and released on August 10, 1945.
