= Heaven Can Wait (1943 film) =

1943 film by Ernst Lubitsch

- Theatrical release poster
- Directed by: Ernst Lubitsch
- Screenplay by: Samson Raphaelson
- Based on: Birthday by Ladislaus Bus-Fekete
- Produced by: Ernst Lubitsch
- Starring: Gene Tierney; Don Ameche; Charles Coburn; Marjorie Main; Laird Cregar; Spring Byington; Allyn Joslyn
- Cinematography: Edward Cronjager
- Edited by: Dorothy Spencer
- Music by: Alfred Newman
- Production company: 20th Century-Fox
- Distributed by: 20th Century-Fox
- Release date: August 5, 1943 (Atlanta)
- Running time: 112 minutes
- Country: United States
- Language: English
- Budget: $1.1 million
- Box office: $4 million

Heaven Can Wait is a 1943 American supernatural romantic comedy-drama film produced and directed by Ernst Lubitsch and starring Gene Tierney, Don Ameche, and Charles Coburn. The film follows Henry Van Cleve, a man brought up in late 19th-century New York who, upon his death in 1942, attempts to argue to Satan that he deserves to be in Hell based on his life choices. The screenplay by Samson Raphaelson is based on the play Birthday by Ladislaus Bus-Fekete. The music score was by Alfred Newman and the cinematography by Edward Cronjager.

The film has no connection to the fantasy-based stage play of the same title that was adapted as the 1941 film Here Comes Mr. Jordan (itself also a Best Picture nominee), nor remakes of Mr. Jordan using the play's original title, including the 1978 film, Heaven Can Wait.

== Plot ==
An aged Henry Van Cleve enters the opulent reception area of "where innumerable people had so often told him to go", to be personally greeted by "His Excellency". Henry petitions to be admitted, fully aware of the kind of life he has led, but some doubt exists as to his qualifications. To prove his worthiness (and unworthiness of Heaven), he begins to tell the story of his dissolute life.

Born in Manhattan on October 25, 1872, Henry is the spoiled only child of stuffy, naive, wealthy parents Randolph and Bertha. His paternal grandmother is also doting and naive, although his down-to-earth grandfather Hugo Van Cleve, a self-made millionaire, understands Henry quite well. Henry grows up to be an idle young man with a taste for attractive showgirls. One day, Henry overhears a beautiful woman lying to her mother on a public telephone. Intrigued, he follows her into a Brentano's bookstore and pretends to be an employee to get to know her better. Despite learning that she is engaged to marry, he begins making advances, finally confessing he does not work there, whereupon she hastily departs.

Later, Henry's obnoxious cousin Albert introduces the family to his fiancée, Martha, and her feuding parents, the Strables. Henry is shocked to find that Martha is the mystery woman from the bookstore. It turns out that Albert was the first suitor of whom both her parents approved. Fearful of spending the rest of her life as a spinster in Kansas City, Martha agreed to marry him. Henry convinces her to elope with him instead. Though everyone except Grandpa Van Cleve is scandalized, they are eventually received back into the family.

Henry and Martha enjoy a happy marriage and become the proud parents of a boy. On the eve of their tenth anniversary, however, Martha finds out about what appears to be Henry's continuing dalliances with other women and returns to her parents' home in Kansas. Henry and Grandpa follow her there. Sneaking into the Strable house, Henry corrects the misunderstanding, begs her forgiveness, and talks her into "eloping" a second time, much to Grandpa's delight.

Fifteen years later, Henry meets chorus girl Peggy Nash in her dressing room shortly before her performance. What seems to be an attempt at courtship is soon revealed as an attempt by Henry to turn her away from his son, Jack, who has been dating her. When Peggy reveals her knowledge of his true identity, Henry buys her off, instead, for $25,000 (equivalent to approximately $400,000 in 2025). Jack later reveals he was glad to have got rid of her so easily.

Martha dies shortly after their 25th anniversary. Henry resumes an active social life much to the amusement of his son. On October 26, 1942, the day after his 70th birthday, Henry dies under the care of a beautiful nurse, her coming having been portended in a dream. After hearing Henry's story, His Excellency denies him entry and suggests he try the "other place", where Martha and his grandfather are waiting for him, hinting that there may be "a small room vacant in the annex".

== Cast ==
- Gene Tierney as Martha
- Don Ameche as Henry Van Cleve
- Charles Coburn as Hugo Van Cleve
- Marjorie Main as Mrs. Strable
- Laird Cregar as His Excellency
- Spring Byington as Bertha Van Cleve
- Allyn Joslyn as Albert Van Cleve
- Eugene Pallette as E.F. Strable
- Signe Hasso as Mademoiselle
- Louis Calhern as Randolph Van Cleve
- Helene Reynolds as Peggy Nash
- Aubrey Mather as James
- Tod Andrews (credited as Michael Ames) as Jack Van Cleve
- Florence Bates as Edna Craig (uncredited)
- Clara Blandick as Grandmother Van Cleve (uncredited)
- Scotty Beckett as Henry, age 9 (uncredited)
- Leonard Carey as Flogdell, the Van Cleves' first butler (uncredited)
- Claire Du Brey as Miss Ralston, Jack's secretary (uncredited)
- Dick Jones as Albert, age 15 (uncredited)
- Trudy Marshall as Jane Van Cleve (uncredited)
- Edwin Maxwell as doctor (uncredited)
- Doris Merrick as Nellie Brown, night nurse (uncredited)
- Dickie Moore as Henry, age 15 (uncredited)
- Clarence Muse as Jasper, the Strables' butler (uncredited)
- Anne O'Neal as day nurse (uncredited)
- Anita Sharp-Bolster as Mrs. Cooper-Cooper (uncredited)
- Gerald Oliver Smith as Smith, the Van Cleves' second butler (uncredited)

== Production ==
The film was made on a budget of $1,115,400.

== Release ==
Heaven Can Wait opened in Atlanta, Georgia, on August 5, 1943. It premiered in New York City on August 11, 1943.

=== Home media ===
The Criterion Collection released Heaven Can Wait on DVD in 2006 followed by the reissue of the film on Blu-ray on August 21, 2018.

== Reception ==
=== Box office ===
By January 1944, the film had grossed $2.8 million. Film historian Gregory William Mank cites a final box office figure of $3,963,600, with the film earning a profit of $1,286,200.

=== Critical response ===
A contemporary review by Bosley Crowther in The New York Times described the film as "certainly one you'll want to see" and "a comedy of manners, edged with satire, in the slickest Lubitsch style" that "is poking very sly and sentimental fun at Eighteen Nineties naughtiness," adding that although the "picture has utterly no significance. Indeed, it has very little point, except to afford entertainment [...] it does [that] quite well." The review also notes that "Don Ameche and Gene Tierney are flat in the roles. Or rather, they lack the flexibility which such mannered comedy demands."

A review in Variety reported that it features "generous slices of comedy, skillfully handled by producer-director Ernst Lubitsch [who] has endowed it with light, amusing sophistication and heart-warming nostalgia," noting that "Charles Coburn as the fond grandfather [...] walks away with the early sequences in a terrific comedy performance."

In The Nation in 1943, critic James Agee wrote, " ... Ernst Lubitsch's Heaven Can Wait ... is not up to his best; nothing has been, for nearly twenty years. Its real matrix, for that matter, is the sort of smirking, "civilized," Central European puff paste with which the Theatre Guild used to claim to bring vitality to the American stage. But it looks like a jewel against the wood-silk and cellophane which passes for a moving picture now that Hollywood has come of age."

Writing in Turner Classic Movies, critic David Kalat described the film as "a representative example of its time: It's a costume drama that luxuriates in period detail" and "a character study told with inventive narrative techniques and non-chronological structure."

On the review aggregator website, the film holds an approval rating of 89% based on 18 reviews, with an average rating of 8.1/10.

=== Accolades ===
Award	Year	Category	Recipient(s)	Result	Ref.
Academy Awards	1944	Outstanding Motion Picture	Ernst Lubitsch	Nominated	
Academy Awards	1944	Best Director	Ernst Lubitsch	Nominated	
Academy Awards	1944	Best Cinematography – Color	Edward Cronjager	Nominated	
Hugo Awards	1944	Best Dramatic Presentation – Long Form	Samson Raphaelson and Ernst Lubitsch	Won	
Photoplay Awards	1943	Best Performances of the Month (September)	Gene Tierney and Don Ameche	Won	

== Preservation ==
Heaven Can Wait was preserved by the Academy Film Archive in 2015.

== See also ==
- List of films about angels
