= Fashion Model (film) =

1945 film by William Beaudine

- Directed by: William Beaudine
- Written by: Victor Hammond and Tim Ryan
- Starring: Robert Lowery; Marjorie Weaver; Tim Ryan
- Cinematography: Harry Neumann
- Edited by: William Austin; Dan Milner
- Music by: Edward J. Kay
- Distributed by: Monogram Pictures
- Release date: March 2, 1945
- Running time: 61 minutes
- Country: United States
- Language: English

Fashion Model is a 1945 American comedy mystery film directed by William Beaudine and starring Robert Lowery, Marjorie Weaver and Tim Ryan. The screenplay was written by Victor Hammond and Ryan.

The film is considered the third in a series of Beaudine's films featuring a female detective following Detective Kitty O'Day (1944) and Adventures of Kitty O'Day (1944).

The film premiered on March 2, 1945.

== Plot ==
When a prominent fashion model is murdered, a stockboy accused of the crime must clear his name, working with another model.

== Cast ==
- Robert Lowery as Jimmy O'Brien
- Marjorie Weaver as Peggy Rooney
- Tim Ryan as O'Hara
- Lorna Gray as Yvonne Brewster
- Dorothy Christy as Madame Celeste
- Dewey Robinson as Grogan
- Sally Yarnell as Marie Lewis
- Jack Norton as Herbert
- Harry Depp as Harvey Van Allen
- Nell Craig as Jessica Van Allen
- Edward Keane as Jacques Duval
- John Valentine as Davis

== Reception ==
A contemporary review in The Brooklyn Daily Eagle concluded: "Fast-moving and well acted, the film provides pleasant diversion for one hour and one minute."
