= Shooting High =

1940 film by Alfred E. Green

- Theatrical release poster
- Directed by: Alfred E. Green
- Screenplay by: Lou Breslow; Owen Francis
- Produced by: John Stone
- Starring: Jane Withers; Gene Autry; Marjorie Weaver; Frank M. Thomas; Robert Lowery; Kay Aldridge; Hobart Cavanaugh; Jack Carson; Hamilton MacFadden
- Cinematography: Ernest Palmer
- Edited by: Nick DeMaggio
- Music by: Samuel Kaylin
- Production company: 20th Century-Fox
- Distributed by: 20th Century-Fox
- Release date: April 26, 1940 (U.S.)
- Running time: 66 minutes
- Country: United States
- Language: English

Shooting High is a 1940 American Western film directed by Alfred E. Green and starring Jane Withers, Gene Autry, and Marjorie Weaver. Written by Lou Breslow and Owen Francis, the film is about a generations-old feud between two families. This feud is revived when the town banker tries to construct a highway through the area where a monument is installed to the frontiersman ancestor of one of the families.

Gene Autry, known as the "singing cowboy", was then under contract to Republic Pictures. Thirteen-year-old Jane Withers was a movie star and powerful box office draw. She wanted to make a movie with him, and arranged for him to be loaned to 20th Century-Fox by talking directly to each of the studio heads. Shooting High was a success.

== Plot ==
The Carsons and the Pritchards have been feuding for generations in the town of Carson's Corners. The budding romance between Will Carson (Gene Autry) and Marjorie Pritchard (Marjorie Weaver) is being threatened by this long-standing feud. Marjorie's father, Calvin Pritchard (Frank M. Thomas), is the bank president and mayor of Carson's Corners. He pretends to support Will's courtship of his daughter because he needs to acquire a piece of Carson property for a proposed highway through the area. When Will learns of Pritchard's motives, he accuses Marjorie of scheming with her father to steal Carson land.

The long-simmering feud between the Carsons and the Pritchards erupts over Will's accusation. Just as the families renew their bickering, Gabby Cross (Jack Carson), a publicity agent for Spectrum Pictures, arrives in town and offers the townspeople $20,000 to use Carson's Corners as a filming location. He is making a movie about Wild Bill Carson, Will's grandfather and the founder of Carson Corners. Still angered by Will's undermining his highway plan, Pritchard refuses Cross's offer. His youngest daughter, Jane (Jane Withers), suggests a compromise that would allow Spectrum Pictures to use the town as a filming location if the highway proposal were approved by the Carsons.

With all parties agreeing to the proposal, the movie company arrives in town and begins production. The star of the film, Bob Merritt (Robert Lowery), begins to court Marjorie. Wanting her sister to marry Will, Jane and the sheriff devise a plan to frighten Merritt out of town, telling him a lynch party is after him. After Merritt leaves town, the head of Spectrum Pictures threatens to sue Pritchard for the defection. Cross suggests giving the part to Will, who agrees on the condition that Pritchard extend the Carson mortgages.

While the movie is being filmed, three gangsters arrive in town. During a bank hold-up scene, the three gangsters put on actors' costumes and steal the money from the bank. Learning of the theft, Will pursues the gangsters on horseback, catches them, and brings them back to Carson Corners with the money. Will's heroic actions wins the respect of the Pritchards, as well as Marjorie's respect and hand in marriage.

== Cast ==
- Jane Withers as Jane Pritchard
- Gene Autry as Will Carson
- Marjorie Weaver as Marjorie Pritchard
- Frank M. Thomas as Calvin Pritchard
- Robert Lowery as Bob Merritt
- Kay Aldridge as Evelyn Trent
- Hobart Cavanaugh as Constable Clem Perkle
- Jack Carson as Gabby Cross
- Hamilton MacFadden as J. Wallace Rutledge
- Charles B. Middleton as Hod Carson
- Ed Brady as Mort Carson
- Tom London as Eph Carson
- Eddie Acuff as Andy Carson
- Pat O'Malley as Lem Pritchard
- George Chandler as Charles Pritchard
- Champion as Gene's Horse (uncredited)

== Production ==
=== Background ===
Jane Withers is considered responsible for recruiting Gene Autry to 20th Century-Fox for Shooting High. At the time the thirteen-year-old star was the number 6 box office draw in the country. She called Joseph M. Schenck, then head of 20th Century-Fox, telling him she wanted to do a film with Gene Autry. Schenck liked the idea, but suspected Republic Pictures would never loan the "singing cowboy" to another studio. Withers contacted the head of Republic Pictures, Herbert J. Yates, and suggested that a group of Fox contract players be loaned to Republic in exchange for Autry. The studios agreed and the film became a hit. Autry, who earned $71,000 per year at Republic, earned $25,000 for his work in this film.

This was Autry's first movie as a co-star, his first since 1934 without the comic presence of Smiley Burnette, and his first playing a character other than himself.

=== Filming ===
Shooting High was filmed November 18 to December 16, 1939.

=== Filming locations ===
- 20th Century Fox backlot, Calabasas, California, USA
- Santa Susana Pass, Simi Valley, Los Angeles
- Corriganville Movie Ranch, Simi Valley, California

=== Stuntwork ===
- Foxy Callahan
- Frank McCarroll
- Henry Wills

=== Soundtrack ===
- "Wanderers" (Felix Bernard, Paul Francis Webster) by Gene Autry and Jane Withers
- "Shanty of Dreams" (Gene Autry, Johnny Marvin) by Gene Autry and Jane Withers
- "Only One Love in a Lifetime" (Gene Autry, Johnny Marvin, Harry Tobias) by Gene Autry
- "Little Old Band of Gold" (Gene Autry, Charles Newman, Fred Glickman) by Gene Autry
- "On the Rancho with My Pancho" (Harry Akst, Sidney Clare)
- "Bridal Chorus (Here Comes the Bride)" (Richard Wagner)
