= J. Edward Bromberg =

Character actor

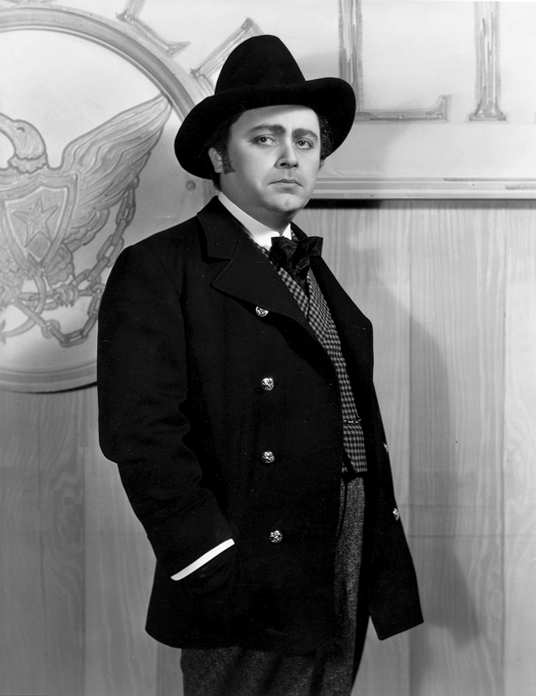
- Bromberg in the Group Theatre's Broadway production Gold Eagle Guy (1934)
- Born: Josef Bromberger; December 25, 1903; Temesvár, Kingdom of Hungary
- Died: December 6, 1951 (aged 47); London, UK
- Resting place: Mount Hebron Cemetery, New York City
- Occupation: Actor
- Years active: 1926–1951
- Spouse: Goldie Doberman (1927–1951, his death)
- Children: 3

Joseph Edward Bromberg (born Josef Bromberger, December 25, 1903 – December 6, 1951) was a Hungarian-born American character actor in motion picture and stage productions dating mostly from the 1930s and 1940s.

Professionally, Bromberg is known for playing secondary roles and supporting parts. In Hollywood Cavalcade he portrays Don Ameche's friend who knows he will never get the girl; in Three Sons he is the lowly business associate who longs to be given a partnership; in Easy to Look At he is the once-great couturier now reduced to night watchman.

In private life, shortly before his death, Bromberg made a defiant appearance before the House Un-American Activities Committee. Bromberg is considered a victim of red-baiting and a casualty of the Hollywood Blacklist. His was one of the "names" named by director Elia Kazan in the director's second appearance before HUAC.

== Early years ==
Born to a Jewish family in Temesvár, Austria-Hungary (now Timișoara, Romania), Bromberg was 11 months old when his parents, Herman and Josephine Roth Bromberger, emigrated with him to the United States, traveling second class on the S/S Graf Waldersee, sailing on March 18, 1905 from Cuxhaven, Germany, and arriving at the Port of New York on March 31. They settled in New York City.

Bromberg's interest in theatricals began while attending Stuyvesant High School, where he was coached by director of drama and future Broadway producer Gustav Blum. Variety reported that in high school, as "J. Edward Bromberger", he "played such weighty roles as Jean Valjean in Les Miserables. With Bromberg as nucleus, the school presented plays which many colleges of the period found tough to do. Odd angle, for a high school, is that Bromberg was starred in several showcases, and a number of Broadway producers were invited to o.o. ["once over", or appraise] the fledgling." After graduating from Stuyvesant, he attended City College of New York for two years and then went to work to help pay for acting lessons with the Russian coach Leo Bulgakov, who had trained with Konstantin Stanislavski.

== Career ==
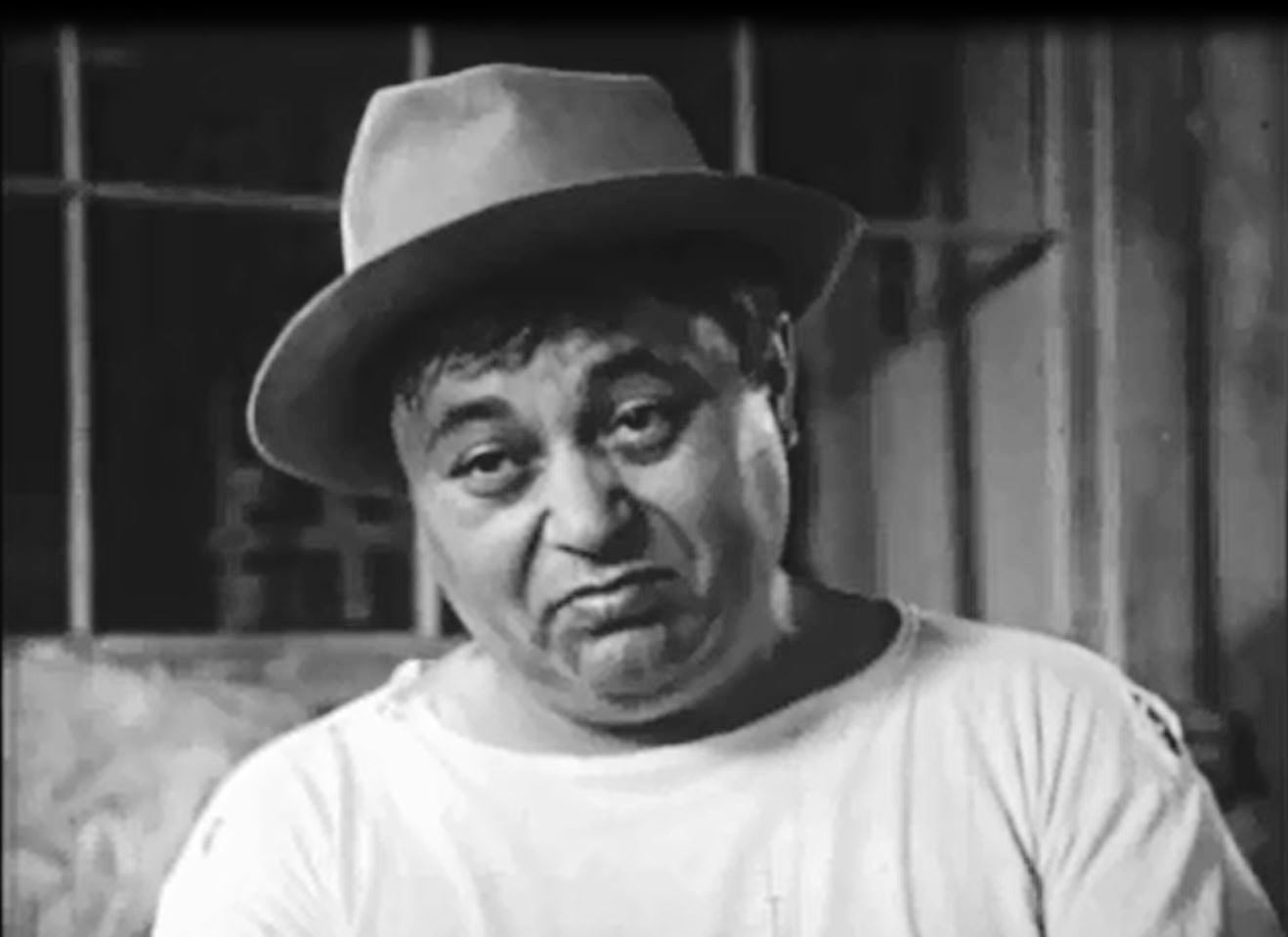
Bromberg in Queen of the Amazons (1947)

By virtue of his physique, the short, somewhat rotund actor was destined to play secondary roles. Bromberg made his stage debut at the Greenwich Village Playhouse and in 1926 made his first appearance in a Broadway play, Princess Turandot. The following year, Bromberg married Goldie Doberman, with whom he had two sons and a daughter.

Occasionally credited as J.E. Bromberg' and Joseph Bromberg, he performed secondary roles in 35 Broadway productions and 53 motion pictures until 1951. For two decades, Bromberg was highly regarded in the New York theatrical world and was a founding member of the Civic Repertory Theatre (1928–1930) and of the Group Theatre (1931–1940).

Bromberg made his screen debut in 1936 under contract to Twentieth Century-Fox. The versatile actor played a wide variety of roles ranging from a ruthless New York newspaper editor (in Charlie Chan on Broadway) to a despotic Indochinese rajah (in Mr. Moto Takes a Chance) to the Alcade of Los Angeles (opposite Tyrone Power in The Mark of Zorro). Although he spoke with no trace of an accent, he was often called upon to play humble immigrants of various nationalities. When Warner Oland, the actor who played Charlie Chan, died in 1938, Fox considered Bromberg as a replacement, but the role ultimately went to Sidney Toler. Fox began loaning Bromberg to other studios in 1939 and finally dropped him from the roster in 1941. He kept working for various producers, including a stint at Universal Pictures in the mid-1940s; his employment there came to an abrupt halt when a change in management did away with all low-budget productions.

Only occasionally was J. Edward Bromberg given leading roles. He played a homespun detective in Fair Warning (1937), Fox's attempt to create an "American" counterpart to its Charlie Chan and Mr. Moto series. "This one rates way ahead of about 75 percent of the more pretentious murder mystery films," raved Film Daily; "the audience interest is with the very human detective J. Edward Bromberg, and his casual way of unraveling two murders and a poisoning." In Republic's The Devil Pays Off (1941) Bromberg played, as reported by Film Bulletin, "the role of a ruthless but fear-ridden shipping magnate with a quiet intensity that is enormously effective." PRC's The Missing Corpse (1945) top-billed Bromberg as a victim of circumstance who finds a corpse in the trunk of his car. "Cast names include some of the best of our standard Hollywood trouping names, all delivering ably under the pace-setting of Bromberg," noted Box Office Digest.

== Blacklisting ==
In September 1950, the anti-communist magazine Red Channels accused Bromberg of being a member of the American Communist Party. Subpoenaed to testify before the House Committee on Un-American Activities in June 1951, Bromberg refused to answer any questions in accordance with his Fifth Amendment rights. Bromberg refused to tell the Committee whether or not he was a member of the Communist Party. He also declined to pledge his support in defense of the United States if ever there were a war with the Soviet Union. Bromberg attacked the Committee for holding hearings "in the nature of witch hunts." As the result of his defiant testimony before the committee, Bromberg was blacklisted from working in Hollywood. He suffered enormous stress from the ordeal; friends, such as Lee Grant, noted that he aged considerably in a very short time.

Bromberg and seven other Group Theater members were named by Elia Kazan as Communist Party members in testimony before the House Un-American Activities Committee. According to Kazan in his 1988 autobiography A Life, the Group Theatre Communist Party cell he belonged to in the Group Theatre met in Bromberg's dressing room. Members of the cell included Clifford Odets and Paula Strasberg.

In 1951, Bromberg sought work in England but died on December 6, during his fourth week of working in the London play The Biggest Thief in Town. He was 47. Motion Picture Herald cited the cause of death as "natural causes."

== Broadway roles ==
- Princess Turandot (1926) - Tartaglia and as Ishmael
- House of Connelly (1931) - Duffy
- Night Over Taos (1932) - Pablo Montoya
- Both Your Houses (1933) - Wingblatt
- Men in White (1933) - Dr. Hochberg
- Gold Eagle Guy (1934) - Guy Button
- Awake and Sing! (1935) - Uncle Morty
- Jacobowsky and the Colonel (1945) - Szabuniewicz
- The Big Knife (1949) - Marcus Hoff

== Filmography ==
- Under Two Flags (1936) - Col, Ferol (film debut)
- Sins of Man (1936) - Anton Engel
- The Crime of Dr. Forbes (1936) - Dr. Eric Godfrey
- Girls' Dormitory (1936) - Dr. Spindler
- Star for a Night (1936) - Doctor Spelimeyer
- Ladies in Love (1936) - Franz Brenner
- Reunion (1936) - Charles Renard
- Stowaway (1936) - Judge Booth
- Fair Warning (1937) - Matthew Jericho
- Seventh Heaven (1937) - Aristide the Astrologer
- That I May Live (1937) - Tex Shapiro
- Charlie Chan on Broadway (1937) - Murdock
- Second Honeymoon (1937) - Herbie
- The Baroness and the Butler (1938) - Zorda
- Sally, Irene and Mary (1938) - Pawnbroker
- Rebecca of Sunnybrook Farm (1938) - Dr. Hill
- Four Men and a Prayer (1938) - General Torres
- One Wild Night (1938) - Norman
- Mr. Moto Takes a Chance (1938) - Rajah Ali
- I'll Give a Million (1938) - Editor
- Suez (1938) - Prince Said
- Jesse James (1939) - Mr. Runyan
- Wife, Husband and Friend (1939) - Rossi
- Three Sons (1939) - Abe Ullman
- Hollywood Cavalcade (1939) - Dave Spingold
- Strange Cargo (1940) - Flaubert
- The Return of Frank James (1940) - George Runyan
- The Mark of Zorro (1940) - Don Luis Quintero
- Dance Hall (1941) - Max Brandon
- Hurricane Smith (1941) - 'Eggs' Bonelli
- The Devil Pays Off (1941) - Arnold DeBrock
- Pacific Blackout (1941) - Pickpocket
- Invisible Agent (1942) - Karl Heiser
- Halfway to Shanghai (1942) - Major Vinpore
- Life Begins at Eight-Thirty (1942) - Sid Gordon
- Reunion in France (1942) - Durand
- Tennessee Johnson (1942) - Coke
- Lady of Burlesque (1943) - S.B. Foss
- Phantom of the Opera (1943) - Amiot
- Son of Dracula (1943) - Professor Lazlo
- Chip Off the Old Block (1944) - Blaney Wright
- Voice in the Wind (1944) - Dr. Hoffman
- Salome, Where She Danced (1945) - Prof. Max
- The Missing Corpse (1945) - Henry Kruger
- Easy to Look At (1945) - Gustav
- Pillow of Death (1945) - Julian Julian
- Tangier (1945) - Alec Rocco
- The Walls Came Tumbling Down (1946) - Ernst Helms
- Cloak and Dagger (1946) - Trenk
- Queen of the Amazons (1947) - Gabby
- Arch of Triumph (1948) - Hotel Manager at the Verdun
- A Song Is Born (1948) - Dr. Elfini
- I Shot Jesse James (1949) - Kane
- Guilty Bystander (1950) - Varkas (final film)
