= I've Been Around (film) =

1935 film by Philip Cahn

- Directed by: Philip Cahn
- Written by: John Meehan
- Produced by: B.F. Zeidman
- Starring: Chester Morris; Rochelle Hudson; G. P. Huntley; Phyllis Brooks
- Cinematography: John J. Mescall
- Edited by: Ray Curtiss
- Music by: Edward Ward; Arthur Morton
- Production company: Universal Pictures
- Distributed by: Universal Pictures
- Release date: March 5, 1935
- Running time: 63 minutes
- Country: United States
- Language: English

I've Been Around is a 1935 American drama film directed by Philip Cahn and starring Chester Morris, Rochelle Hudson and G. P. Huntley. On their wedding night, a woman tells her husband that she loves another man.

== Cast ==
- Chester Morris as Eric Foster
- Rochelle Hudson as Drue Waring
- G. P. Huntley as Franklin 'Nick' De Haven
- Phyllis Brooks as Gay Blackstone
- Gene Lockhart as Sammy Ames
- Isabel Jewell as Sally Van Loan
- Ralph Morgan as John Waring
- William Stack as Doctor
- Henry Armetta as Italian
- Dorothy Christy as Girl
- Verna Hillie as Girl
- Jean Fenwick as Girl
- Patricia Caron as Girl
- Carol Wines as Girl
- Dorothy Granger as Girl
- Lorin Raker as Elevator Man
- C. Daniel Whipple as Orchestra Leader
- King Baggot as Doorman
- Frances Morris as Nurse
- Julie Kingdon as Maid
- William H. O'Brien as Waiter
- Gloria Ann White as Child
- Virginia Odeon as Governess
- Sidney Bracey as Alex, Nick's Man
- Patricia Chapman as Girl
- Arnold Gray as Waiter
- Jack Mulhall as Undetermiend Role
- Betty Blythe as Woman

== Bibliography ==
- Quinlan, David. The Film Lover's Companion: An A to Z Guide to 2,000 Stars and the Movies They Made. Carol Publishing Group, 1997.
