= Murder Over New York =

1940 film by Harry Lachman

- Directed by: Harry Lachman
- Written by: Earl Derr Biggers (characters); Lester Ziffren
- Produced by: Sol M. Wurtzel
- Starring: Sidney Toler; Marjorie Weaver; Ricardo Cortez
- Cinematography: Virgil Miller
- Edited by: Louis R. Loeffler
- Music by: Emil Newman
- Production company: 20th Century-Fox
- Distributed by: 20th Century-Fox
- Release date: December 13, 1940
- Running time: 65 minutes
- Country: United States
- Language: English

Murder Over New York is a 1940 American mystery film directed by Harry Lachman and starring Sidney Toler as Charlie Chan. The cast also features Marjorie Weaver, Robert Lowery and Ricardo Cortez. Chan must solve a murder mystery while attending a police convention. Shemp Howard plays "Shorty McCoy" in an uncredited appearance.

== Plot ==
On a flight to New York for an annual police convention, Chan encounters his old Scotland Yard friend, Hugh Drake (Frederick Worlock). Drake is now a member of military intelligence trying to track down what he believes is a sabotage ring led by a Paul Narvo. A bomber and its pilots crashed the day before. Chan offers his assistance.

Chan is welcomed at the airport by New York Police Inspector Vance and, to Chan's surprise, his number two son Jimmy Chan.

Chan goes to see Drake the next day at the apartment of George Kirby, where a dinner party is in progress. He finds his friend dead of poison gas in Kirby's library, where he had gone to do some work. Drake's briefcase, containing all the information he had gathered about the sabotage ring, is missing. The window is latched, so Chan concludes one of the guests is responsible. Chan discovers that Drake asked that his Oxford classmate Herbert Fenton, actress June Preston and Ralph Percy, chief designer at the Metropolitan Aircraft Corporation, be invited to the party. Kirby himself is the company president. The lost bomber crashed at the company's plant. Also present is stockbroker Keith Jeffery. A servant reports chemist David Elliot insisted on seeing Drake, so he showed him in.

Chan learns that Preston also spoke with Drake that night, on behalf of a friend, Patricia West. West, it turns out, married Narvo in India. When she found out Narvo was involved in sabotage, she fled, only to be pursued by her husband and his assistant, Ramullah.

Ramullah is eventually tracked down, with West's help, and taken into custody. (During a police lineup of Indians, Shorty McCoy, aka "The Canarsie Kid", is revealed to be a faker, not a fakir. Before Ramullah can be questioned, however, he is shot and killed. West narrowly avoids the same fate.

A coatroom attendant shows up and states Drake checked his briefcase at the club where he works. Chan and Vance wait to see who will claim it. It is Boggs, Kirby's butler. He claims that Kirby left him a note instructing him to get the briefcase. Upon close inspection, Chan concludes it is a forgery. While waiting for Kirby to return to his apartment, Jimmy is entrusted to take vital fingerprint evidence to the authorities. He is promptly mugged in the elevator and the evidence stolen. Scolding is postponed when somebody finally turns on the lights in Kirby's office and finds his dead body hidden behind his desk. He had been killed by poisoned brandy, and apparently by somebody he trusted who he was having a friendly drink with.

Chan decides to gather all the suspects at the airport the next day. The airplane, rigged the night before to release poison gas when it dives, takes off for a test flight with nearly everyone aboard. As the bomber starts to descend, Fenton grabs the falling glass globe containing the gas. When they land, he smashes the globe, gets out and locks the door. However, the police are waiting to apprehend him, and Chan and the rest emerge unscathed (the trap had been found during an inspection and rendered harmless). Fenton cannot be Narvo, as the latter is known to be a younger man. He refuses to identify his leader. When Chan asks for a glass of water for Fenton, Jeffrey gets it for him, falling into Chan's trap. The detective samples the water and identifies the same poison that was found in Kirby's brandy.

== Cast ==
- Sidney Toler as Charlie Chan
- Marjorie Weaver as Patricia West
- Robert Lowery as David Elliot
- Ricardo Cortez as George Kirby
- Donald MacBride as Inspector Vance
- Melville Cooper as Herbert Fenton
- Joan Valerie as June Preston
- Kane Richmond as Ralph Percy
- Sen Yung as Jimmy Chan
- John Sutton as Richard Jeffery (called Keith Jeffery by Kirby)
- Leyland Hodgson as Robert Boggs
- Clarence Muse as Butler
- Frederick Worlock as Hugh Drake
- Lal Chand Mehra as Ramullah
- Shemp Howard as Fakir (uncredited)
- Stanley Blystone as Fingerprint Man (uncredited)

== Bibliography ==
- Backer, Ron. Mystery Movie Series of 1930s Hollywood. McFarland, 2012.
