= Maker of Men =

1931 film directed by Edward Sedgwick

- Directed by: Edward Sedgwick
- Written by: Edward Sedgwick (story); Howard J. Green (also story)
- Screenplay by: Howard J. Green
- Starring: Jack Holt; Richard Cromwell; Joan Marsh
- Cinematography: L. William O'Connell
- Edited by: Gene Milford
- Production company: Columbia Pictures
- Distributed by: Columbia Pictures
- Release date: December 18, 1931
- Running time: 71 minutes
- Country: United States
- Language: English

Maker of Men is a 1931 American pre-Code sports melodrama film directed by Edward Sedgwick and written by Howard J. Green and Edward Sedgwick. Produced by Columbia Pictures Corporation, the film stars Jack Holt, Richard Cromwell, and Joan Marsh. It also features John Wayne in a supporting role.

== Plot ==
Coach Dudley is a hard-driving college football coach, who strives to shape the character of his players, transforming them into real men. Unfortunately, the Coach's son, Bob, who plays for him, hates sports and participates only because he is forced to do so. Bob lets his team down through cowardice and laziness and as a result is rejected by his father, his college sweetheart Dorothy, and his school. Bob joins a rival college team with the plan to defeat his father's team. In the end, Bob pulls himself together to win the Big Game, proving himself worthy of his father's name.

== Cast ==
- Jack Holt as Coach Dudley
- Richard Cromwell as Bob Dudley
- Joan Marsh as Dorothy
- John Wayne as Dusty Rhodes
- Natalie Moorhead as Mrs. Rhodes
- Richard Tucker as Mr. Rhodes
- Walter Catlett as McNeil
- Ethel Wales as Aunt Martha
- LeRoy Mason as Chick (credited as Robert Alden)
- Paul Hurst as Gabby

== See also ==
- John Wayne filmography
- List of American football films
