= Another Face =

1935 film by Christy Cabanne

- Directed by: Christy Cabanne
- Written by: Garrett Graham; John Twist
- Story by: Thomas Dugan; Ray Mayer
- Produced by: Cliff Reid
- Starring: Wallace Ford; Brian Donlevy; Phyllis Brooks
- Cinematography: Jack MacKenzie
- Edited by: George Hively
- Music by: Roy Webb
- Production company: RKO Radio Pictures
- Distributed by: RKO Radio Pictures
- Release date: November 18, 1935
- Running time: 69-72 minutes
- Country: United States
- Language: English

Another Face (released in the UK as It Happened in Hollywood) is a 1935 crime film directed by Christy Cabanne and starring Wallace Ford, Brian Donlevy and Phyllis Brooks. A wanted gangster has plastic surgery and becomes an actor.

== Plot ==
Wanted by the police, murderer and gang leader Broken Nose Dawson goes to unscrupulous Dr. H. L. Buler to have his appearance changed. Buler is assisted by nurse Mary McCall, who is aghast when she recognizes the patient. When Dawson heals, he is amazed by his new face; his underling, Muggsie Brown, remarks that he is now as handsome as a movie star.

Dawson sends Muggsie to eliminate Buler and McCall, then phones in an anonymous tip about his henchman to get rid of everyone who knows about his new appearance. Muggsie kills Buler and a nurse (only it is not McCall) and is in turn gunned down by the police. Frightened when she reads about the murders in the newspaper, McCall flees across the country.

Remembering Muggsie's comment, Dawson decides to become a movie star and moves to Hollywood, where he takes elocution lessons. Under the alias "Spencer Dutro", he gets hired to portray a gangster opposite top actress Sheila Barry by director Bill Branch. Barry is unimpressed by Dutro's acting ability and inflated ego.

Meanwhile, Zenith Studio press agent Joe Haynes is warned about his publicity stunts by Police Captain Spellman. Studio general manager Charles L. Kellar agrees that Joe's zany antics have to stop.

Mary McCall calls on Haynes, sent by her fiance, Western star Tex Williams, to get a job. She recognizes Dutro from publicity photos on Haynes' desk and tells Haynes who he is. When Dutro comes into the office, Haynes locks McCall in a closet for her safety. After getting Dutro to leave, however, Haynes decides not to call the police right away. He wants to milk the gangster's capture for all the publicity he can; Kellar reluctantly approves his plan.

Haynes arranges for everyone to work on the film that night, including an annoyed Barry (they were to fly to Yuma to get married). Things do not go quite as planned: when the police arrive, Dutro takes Barry hostage and flees. In the search of the studio grounds, Dutro also captures Haynes. When Dutro tries to leave a building and get to a car, Haynes pushes Barry outside and locks the door, with the two men inside. A chase ensues. In the end, Haynes manages to knock Dutro out, and is forgiven by Barry for his latest caper.

== Cast ==
- Wallace Ford as Joe Haynes
- Brian Donlevy as Broken Nose Dawson, aka Spencer Dutro
- Phyllis Brooks as Sheila Barry
- Erik Rhodes as Grimm, assistant director
- Molly Lamont as Mary McCall
- Alan Hale as Charles L. Kellar
- Addison Randall as Tex Williams
- Paul Stanton as Bill Branch, director
- Oscar Apfel as Dr. H. J. Buler (uncredited)
- Hattie McDaniel as Nellie, Sheila's Maid (uncredited)
