= Dangerous Passage =

1944 film by William A. Berke

- Theatrical release poster
- Directed by: William Berke
- Screenplay by: Daniel Mainwaring
- Produced by: William H. Pine; William C. Thomas
- Starring: Robert Lowery; Phyllis Brooks
- Cinematography: Fred Jackman Jr.
- Edited by: Henry Adams
- Music by: Alexander Laszlo
- Distributed by: Paramount Pictures
- Release date: 18 December 1944 (United States)
- Running time: 60 minutes
- Country: United States
- Language: English

Dangerous Passage is a 1944 American film noir drama film directed by William Berke, starring Robert Lowery and Phyllis Brooks.

== Plot ==
Oil company employee Joe Beck is stationed in the jungle in Honduras. When his grandfather back in Texas dies, he inherits $200,000. In a nearby port he meets with the testament executor, attorney Daniel Bergstrom to receive the good news, but when he is to return to the jungle, he is followed by a suspicious man hired by the attorney, who assaults him with a knife and tries to steal his identity papers. Joe instead manages to kill the man, and books passage on the first ship leaving port.

On the ship, the Merman, is Dawson, a steward who helped Joe against his unknown assailant. Also on the ship are Captain Saul and his mate, Buck Harris. Among the few passengers is the alluring Nita Paxton, a cabaret artist whom Joe takes a liking to the minute he boards the ship.

Before the ship lands in its first port on the cruise, Dawson is murdered, and his body placed in Joe's cabin. Joe moves the body to a lifeboat, hidden under a tarp, but the body later disappears. On shore in Los Altos, Joe and Nita go off romancing together. Upon their return to the ship, Joe discovers that Bergstrom has come aboard and brought a man calling himself Joe Beck. Joe instantly suspects Nita of being in cahoots with Bergstrom, trying to trick him out of his inheritance. She then confides in him, that Dawson was an undercover agent for an insurance company, suspecting the captain and his crew of insurance fraud. She is trying to finish his work after he disappeared.

Waiting for Joe in his cabin are Bergstrom and the impostor, who hold him at gun point, demanding he give them his ID and papers. Joe overpowers the impostor, grabs the gun and forces the men to leave his cabin.

In the night, Joe is woken by a nearby foghorn and notices the ship heading into the rocks. He tries to stop Saul and take the wheel, but is knocked unconscious and locked into his cabin. Nita manages to break down the door with an axe and free him. The only ones left on the ship are the two of them and Bergstrom and his impostor, since the rest of the crew has abandoned ship. Bergstrom suggests they work together to stay alive, assuring Joe he has given up his plan to take his money.

When Bergstrom and impostor Zomano hear on the radio that a rescue seaplane has been dispatched, they plan again to do away with Joe. While the three men are standing over a deck hatch, looking deep into a ships hold, Joe is pushed in, knocked unconscious and left to drown. Joe doesn't drown, is rescued and wakes in a hospital in Tampico Mexico.

Joe goes to Galveston, Texas, to collect his identification papers which he has sent in advance by mail, but finds that Nita has already been there in his place and fetched them. He tracks her down and discovers her with Bergstrom and Zomano. They threaten to kill her, demanding the papers but Bergstrom finds the papers hidden in a music box.

Joe climbs into the apartment through a window, and in self-defence manages to shoot and kill the Zomano. Bergstrom calls the police, trying to deflect the situation solely on Zomano. Bergstrom is prevented from leaving and the three await the police to arrive. Joe and Nita reunite with a kiss.

== Cast ==
- Robert Lowery as Joe Beck
- Phyllis Brooks as Nita Paxton
- Charles Arnt as Daniel Bergstrom
- Jack La Rue as Mike Zomano
- John Eldredge as Vaughn
- Victor Kilian as Buck Harris, 1st Mate
- Alec Craig as Dawson the Steward
- William Edmunds as Captain Saul

== Production ==
The film was written by Daniel Mainwaring, who wrote books under the name "Geoffrey Homes", some of which had been filmed by Pine-Thomas. Mainwaring signed a long-term contract with Pine-Thomas in May 1944 to write scripts, of which this was the first.

Filming started on 3 August 1944.
