= The Baroness and the Butler =

1938 film

- Directed by: Walter Lang
- Written by: Sam Hellman; Lamar Trotti; Kathryn Scola
- Based on: Jean by Ladislaus Bus-Fekete
- Produced by: Raymond Griffith
- Starring: William Powell; Annabella; Helen Westley
- Cinematography: Arthur C. Miller
- Edited by: Barbara McLean
- Music by: Louis Silvers
- Production company: Twentieth Century-Fox
- Distributed by: Twentieth Century-Fox
- Release date: February 18, 1938
- Running time: 80 minutes
- Country: United States
- Language: English

The Baroness and the Butler is a 1938 American romantic comedy film directed by Walter Lang and starring William Powell and Annabella in her American English-language debut. The supporting cast includes Helen Westley, Joseph Schildkraut, Nigel Bruce and Lynn Bari. The film was produced and distributed by Twentieth Century-Fox. It is based on the play Jean by the Hungarian writer Ladislaus Bus-Fekete. It received a generally positive reception from film critics.

== Plot ==
Johann Porok, a third-generation butler in the service of Count Albert Sandor, the Prime Minister of Hungary, is unexpectedly elected to the Hungarian parliament, representing the opposition Social Progressive Party. Despite this, he insists on remaining a servant as well. Count Sandor is pleased with this peculiar arrangement, as he has found Johann to be the perfect butler and does not wish to break in a new man. His daughter, Baroness Katrina Marissey, however, considers Johann a traitor and treats him very coldly.

In parliament, Johann attacks the Prime Minister, his employer, for yearly promising much to the poor underclass and delivering nothing, always citing "difficulties". To Katrina's puzzlement, the Count is not offended in the least and remains quite friendly with Johann. Within three months, Johann becomes the leader of his party. Katrina becomes more and more furious, finally throwing her purse and striking Johann in parliament during one of his scathing speeches. When his colleagues assume it was thrown by someone from the ruling conservative party, a brawl breaks out, and Johann and the Prime Minister hastily depart. Baron Georg Marissey, Katrina's husband and another member of parliament, later informs them that a vote of confidence was held after they left; the Count lost and will have to resign as Prime Minister. He is pleased to be able to spend more time with his wife. However, he reluctantly discharges Johann, as he has been neglecting his duties as head butler. They part good friends.

When Katrina holds a ball, her ambitious husband invites Johann without her knowledge. Left alone together, Katrina gradually warms to Johann. Then he confesses that he loves her, and that is why he is trying to better himself, even though he knows his cause is hopeless. Katrina embraces and kisses him. They are interrupted by Georg and Major Andros, another ardent admirer of Katrina. In private, Georg offers to divorce Katrina in return for Johann nominating him for the office of Minister of Commerce. Despite Katrina's strong opposition, Johann does just that in parliament. However, Katrina denounces the bargain in public, and Georg is forced to leave the parliamentary chamber in disgrace. In the final scene, Johann Porok is served breakfast in bed by the "maid", Katrina, who is revealed to be Mrs. Porok.

== Cast ==
- William Powell as Johann Porok
- Annabella as Baroness Katrina Marissey
- Helen Westley as Countess Sandor
- Henry Stephenson as Count Albert Sandor
- Joseph Schildkraut as Baron Georg Marissey
- J. Edward Bromberg as Zorda
- Nigel Bruce as Major Andros
- Lynn Bari as Klari, a maid attracted to Johann
- Maurice Cass as Radio Announcer
- Ivan F. Simpson as Count Dormo
- Alphonse Ethier as President
- Claire Du Brey as Martha
- Wilfred Lucas as Member of Parliament
- Sidney Bracey as Member of Parliament
- Frank Baker as Member of Parliament
- Eleanor Wesselhoeft as Sandor's Housekeeper
- George Davis as Radio Technician
- Margaret Irving as Countess Olga
- Ruth Peterson as Theresa, a Maid
- Doris Lloyd as Lady at Charity Party
- Charlotte Wynters as Lady at Charity Party

== Production ==
According to Robert Osborne, host of Turner Classic Movies, Powell decided that work would ease his grief over the untimely death of his girlfriend, Jean Harlow, on June 7, 1937. He had also undergone surgery for cancer. Osborne suggests that he welcomed being loaned out to Twentieth Century-Fox, rather than working for his home studio of Metro-Goldwyn-Mayer, which had strong associations with Harlow.

Another motivation, not revealed at the time, was Powell's insistence that Fox sign his ex-wife Eileen Wilson Powell to a two-year film contract. She was a stage actress who had long wished to make films. Ironically, a sudden onset of severe illness prevented her from making any films under this contract before her early death in 1942.

== Bibliography ==
- Bryant, Roger. William Powell: The Life and Films. McFarland, 2014.
