= Phyllis Brooks =

American actress and model (1915–1995)

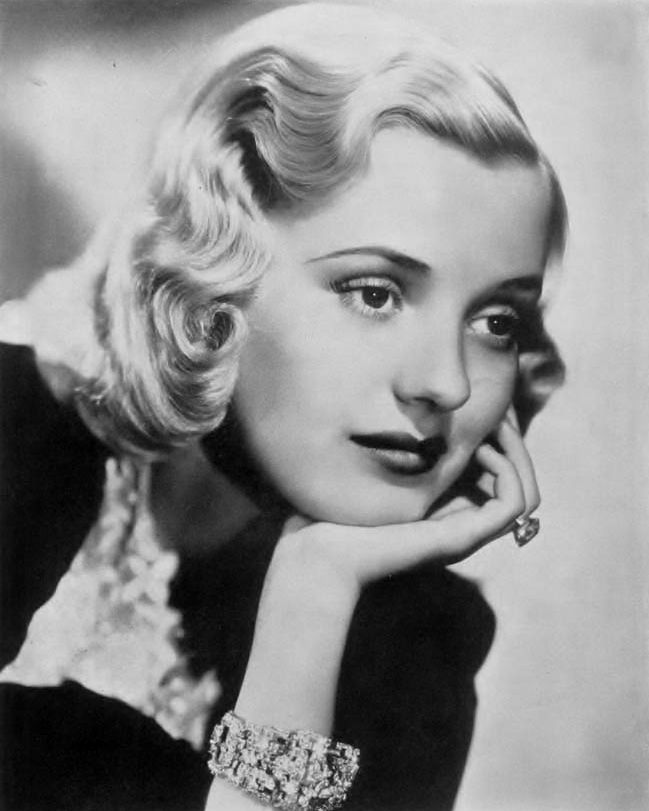
- Brooks in 1939
- Born: July 18, 1915; Boise, Idaho, U.S.
- Died: August 1, 1995 (aged 80); Cape Neddick, Maine, U.S.
- Occupations: Actress; Model
- Years active: 1934–1952
- Known for: In Old Chicago; Rebecca of Sunnybrook Farm; The Unseen; The Shanghai Gesture; Little Miss Broadway; Lady in the Dark; Charlie Chan in Reno
- Spouse: Torbert H. Macdonald (m. 1945; died 1976)
- Children: 4

Phyllis Brooks (July 18, 1915 – August 1, 1995) was an American actress and model. She was born Phyllis Seiler in Boise, Idaho. Some sources have also inaccurately cited 1914 as her year of birth, but 1915 is the correct year according to Social Security records.

== Career ==
=== Modeling ===
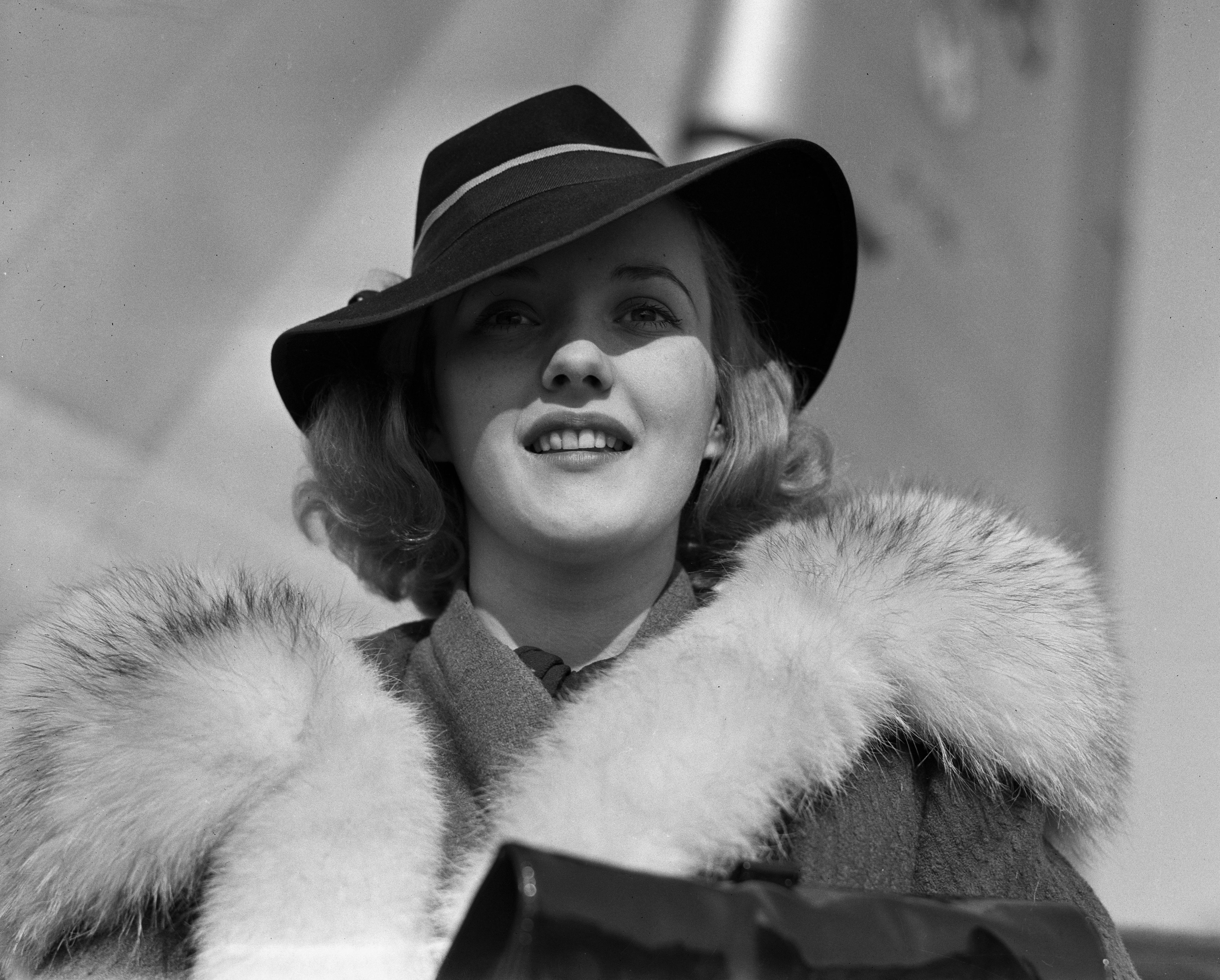
Brooks wearing a coat and fedora (1937)

Brooks was a model for two years before progressing to a career in film. She stated, "I started posing for photographers as a lark, and it was a lot of fun."

She had been known as the "Ipana Toothpaste Girl", due to her work for that product.

=== Film ===
Initially known as Mary Brooks, she began her career in films in 1934 at age 20, in I've Been Around. Brooks, who had about 30 performances in films, was a B-movie leading lady during the 1930s and 1940s, with roles in such films as In Old Chicago (1937), Little Miss Broadway (1938) and The Shanghai Gesture (1941).

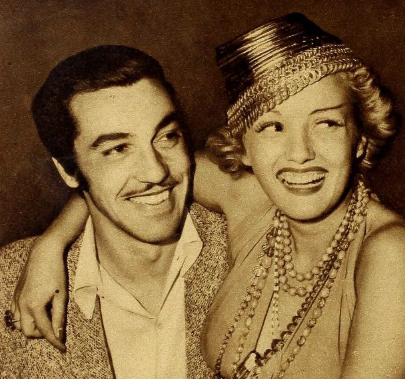
Phyllis Brooks with actor Cesar Romero, c. 1940

She appeared in Sidney Toler's Charlie Chan series, in the Shirley Temple films Rebecca of Sunnybrook Farm and in Little Miss Broadway.

=== Stage ===
On Broadway, Brooks appeared in Stage Door (1936–37), Panama Hattie (1940–42), The Night Before Christmas (1941), and Round Trip (1945).

== Wartime activities ==
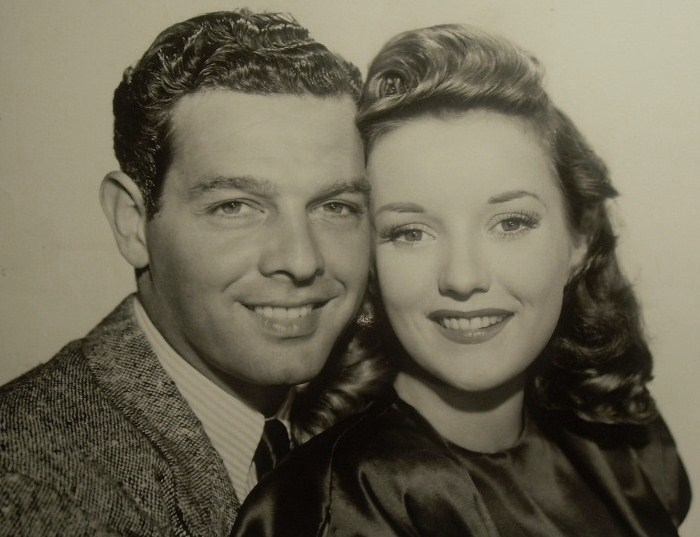
Robert Lowery and Brooks on High Powered (1945)

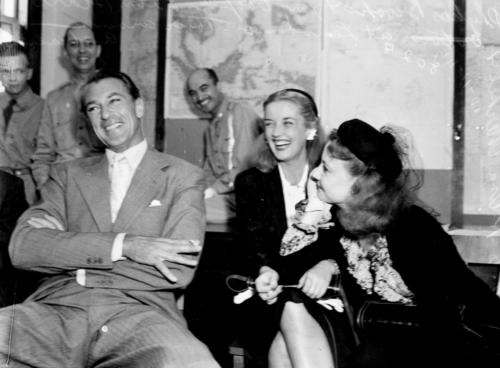
Phyllis Brooks (middle) with Gary Cooper and Una Merkel at a Brisbane press conference on their way to entertain the troops (1943)

Brooks was reported (UK Sunday Telegraph December 1942) as being president of Parties Unlimited Inc. in an article about Hollywood at war. Along with actress Una Merkel and accompanied by film star Gary Cooper, Brooks was the first civilian woman to travel to the Pacific theater of war during World War II on a USO tour.

== Personal life ==
Brooks was engaged at one time to Cary Grant. She married Torbert Macdonald on June 23, 1945, in Tarrytown, New York.

Brooks moved east to Cambridge, Massachusetts with her new husband in 1945 so that he could complete his studies at Harvard Law School. He had been a Harvard football captain and a decorated PT boat captain in World War II. Macdonald died in office in 1976. they had 4 children.

== Death ==
Brooks died on August 1, 1995, in Cape Neddick, Maine, aged 80.

== Partial filmography ==
- One Exciting Adventure (1934) - Minor Role (uncredited)
- Strange Wives (1934) - The Actress
- The Man Who Reclaimed His Head (1934) - Secretary (uncredited)
- I've Been Around (1935) - Gay Blackstone
- McFadden's Flats (1935) - Mary Ellis Hall
- Lady Tubbs (1935) - Debutante (uncredited)
- Another Face (1935) - Sheila Barry
- To Beat the Band (1935) - Rowena
- Two in the Dark (1936) - Minor Role
- Follow the Fleet (1936) - Minor Role (uncredited)
- You Can't Have Everything (1937) - Evelyn Moore
- Dangerously Yours (1937) - Valerie Barton
- Ali Baba Goes to Town (1937) - Phyllis Brooks - at Premiere (uncredited)
- In Old Chicago (1938) - Ann Colby
- City Girl (1938) - Ellen Ward
- Walking Down Broadway (1938) - Vicki Stone
- Rebecca of Sunnybrook Farm (1938) - Lola Lee
- Little Miss Broadway (1938) - Barbara Shea
- Straight Place and Show (1938) - Barbara 'Babs' Drake
- Up the River (1938) - Helen Lindsay
- Charlie Chan in Honolulu (1938) - Judy Hayes
- Charlie Chan in Reno (1939) - Vivian Wells
- Lucky to Me (1939) - Pamela Stuart
- Slightly Honorable (1939) - Sarilla Cushing
- The Flying Squad (1940) - Ann Perryman
- The Shanghai Gesture (1941) - The Chorus Girl
- No Place for a Lady (1943) - Dolly Adair
- Silver Spurs (1943) - Mary Hardigan
- Hi'ya, Sailor (1943) - Nanette
- Lady in the Dark (1944) - Allison DuBois
- Wilson (1944) - Granddaughter (uncredited)
- Dangerous Passage (1944) - Nita Paxton
- High Powered (1945) - Marian Blair
- The Unseen (1945) - Maxine
