= The Californian (film) =

1937 film by Gus Meins

- Theatrical release poster
- Directed by: Gus Meins
- Screenplay by: Gordon Newell; Gilbert Wright
- Story by: Gordon Newell; Gilbert Wright
- Produced by: Sol Lesser
- Starring: Ricardo Cortez; Marjorie Weaver; Katherine DeMille; Maurice Black; Morgan Wallace; Nigel De Brulier
- Cinematography: Harry Neumann
- Edited by: Arthur Hilton; Carl Pierson
- Production company: Sol Lesser Productions
- Distributed by: 20th Century Fox
- Release date: July 18, 1937
- Running time: 59 minutes
- Country: United States
- Language: English

The Californian is a 1937 American Western film directed by Gus Meins and written by Gordon Newell and Gilbert Wright. The film stars Ricardo Cortez, Marjorie Weaver, Katherine DeMille, Maurice Black, Morgan Wallace and Nigel De Brulier. The film was released on July 18, 1937, by 20th Century Fox.

== Plot ==
Ramon Escobar comes back to California after attending school in Spain, and finds corrupt politicians mistreating the people of California.

== Cast ==
- Ricardo Cortez as Ramon Escobar
- Marjorie Weaver as Rosalia Miller
- Katherine DeMille as Chata
- Maurice Black as Pancho
- Morgan Wallace as Tod Barsto
- Nigel De Brulier as Don Francisco Escobar
- George Regas as Ruiz
- Pierre Watkin as Miller
- James Farley as Sheriff Stanton
- Edward Keane as Marshal Morse
- Gene Reynolds as Ramon as a Child
- Ann Gillis as Rosalia as a Child
- Francisco Flores del Campo as Ruiz as a Child
- Billy Bletcher as Tax Collector

== Critical reception ==
The Film Daily described the film as "an action filled interesting and entertaining outdoor drama". They wrote, "Comedy is delightfully worked into the proceedings. Under Gus Meins' direction, a familiar plot is made enjoyable by a nice balancing of action with laugh material and well handled romance. The cast headed by [Ricardo] Cortez, Marjorie Weaver, Katherine DeMille, Maurice Black and Morgan Wallace perform in fine style."
