= The Great Alaskan Mystery =

1944 film by Ray Taylor, Lewis D. Collins

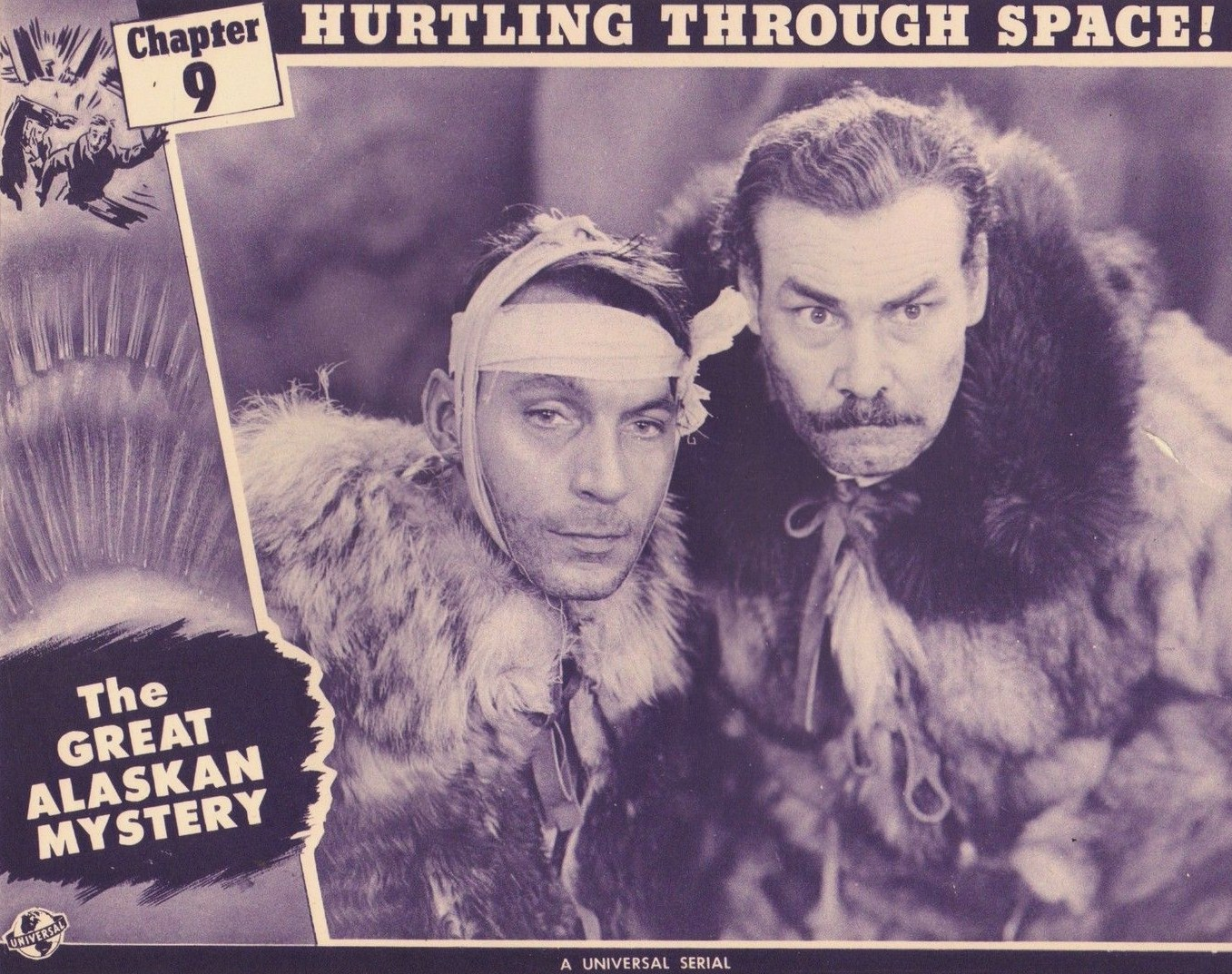
- Directed by: Lewis D. Collins; Ray Taylor
- Written by: Jack Foley; George H. Plympton; Maurice Tombragel
- Produced by: Henry MacRae
- Starring: Milburn Stone; Marjorie Weaver; Edgar Kennedy; Samuel S. Hinds; Martin Kosleck; Ralph Morgan
- Cinematography: Harry Neumann; William A. Sickner
- Edited by: Irving Birnbaum; Jack Dolan; Ace Herman; Alvin Todd; Edgar Zane
- Distributed by: Universal Pictures
- Release date: April 25, 1944
- Running time: 13 chapters (223 minutes)
- Country: United States
- Language: English

The Great Alaskan Mystery is a 1944 Universal film serial about government agents trying to stop Nazi spies from getting their hands on futuristic weapons.

== Plot ==
James 'Jim' Hudson, an adventurer and accompanied by allies, goes after Nazi agents who have a new death ray called the Paratron...

== Cast ==
- Milburn Stone as Jim Hudson
- Marjorie Weaver as Ruth Miller
- Edgar Kennedy as Bosun Higgins
- Samuel S. Hinds as Herman Brock
- Martin Kosleck as Dr Hauss
- Ralph Morgan as Dr Miller
- Joseph Crehan as Bill Hudson
- Fuzzy Knight as "Grit" Hartman
- Harry Cording as Captain Greeder
- Anthony Warde as Brandon

== Critical reception ==
The author of a book on movie serials, William C. Cline, considers this to be a mediocre serial but possessing a good cast and all the necessary "ingredients" of a good serial.

== Chapter titles ==
1. Shipwrecked Among Icebergs (18 min 03s)
2. Thundering Doom (18 min 56s)
3. Battle in the Clouds (17 min 02s)
4. Masked Murder (17 min 32s)
5. The Bridge of Disaster (17 min 46s)
6. Shattering Doom (16 min 34s)
7. Crashing Timbers (15 min 35s)
8. In a Flaming Plane (17 min 24s)
9. Hurtling Through Space (17 min 19s)
10. Tricked by a Booby Trap (17 min 04s)
11. The Tunnel of Terror (16 min 37s)
12. Electrocuted (17 min 42s)
13. The Boomerang (16 min 34s)

_{Source:}

== See also ==
- List of American films of 1944
- List of film serials by year
- List of film serials by studio
- List of films in the public domain in the United States

Preceded by Adventures of the Flying Cadets (1943)	Universal Serial; The Great Alaskan Mystery (1944)	Succeeded by Raiders of Ghost City (1944)
