= Joan Marsh =

American actress (1914–2000)

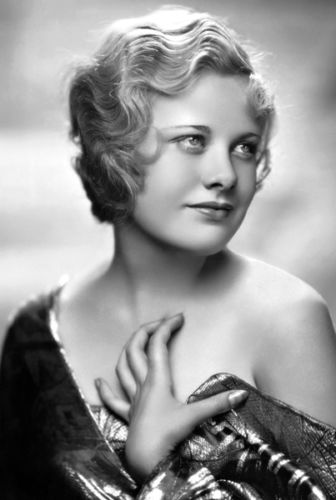
- Born: Dorothy Rosher (Note: Some sources list Marsh's birth year as 1913, and others 1914; the day, July 10, however, is consistent among them. The California Birth Index corroborates a birthdate of July 10, 1914, for Dorothy Rosher, born in Tulare County, California. Furthermore, some sources (primarily obituaries) suggest that her birth name was Nancy Rosher, though the California Birth Index entry conflicts with this claim.); July 10, 1914; Porterville, California, U.S.
- Died: August 10, 2000 (aged 86); Ojai, California, U.S.
- Other name: Dorothy D. Rosher
- Occupation: Actress
- Years active: 1915–1944
- Spouses: Charles S. Belden (m. 1938; div. 1943) John D. W. Morrill (m. 1943)

Joan Marsh (July 10, 1914 – August 10, 2000) was an American child actress in silent films between 1915 and 1921. Later, during the sound era, she resumed her acting career and performed in a variety of films during the 1930s and 1940s.

== Early years ==
Marsh was born Dorothy D. Rosher (although some obituaries incorrectly listed her given name as Nancy Ann Rosher) in Porterville, California. She was the daughter of esteemed silent-film photographer Charles Rosher and his wife Lolita. Her parents later divorced.

== Career ==
In 1915, Marsh made her first film appearance, uncredited, in the short The Mad Maid of the Forest, which her father was filming. Later that same year she was also cast in Hearts Aflame and then billed as Dorothy Rosher. In 1917 she appeared too in A Little Princess and in no less than five other productions in 1918, including the comedy-drama Women's Weapons for Paramount Pictures. After these minor roles as a baby and toddler, Marsh finally became a star in Mary Pickford films such as Daddy-Long-Legs (1919) and Pollyanna (1920). Marsh made her last film appearance as a child in 1921.

She returned to films nine years later with a role in Universal's King of Jazz, in which she sang with Bing Crosby. While at Universal she was featured in the studio's revival of their popular silent series The Leather Pushers, along with another King of Jazz performer, Canadian bandleader Jack White. She was considered a promising starlet and, in 1931, Marsh was one of 13 actresses named as WAMPAS baby stars. She signed with Metro-Goldwyn-Mayer but was released from her contract in 1932. Harry Cohn of Columbia, always willing to sign MGM's castoffs, hired her for two features, after which she freelanced among almost all the Hollywood studios, large and small. She had built enough of a name to receive featured roles; her most familiar role of the 1930s is probably as W. C. Fields's daughter in 1934's You're Telling Me! (Marsh made an impression on Fields, and in a subsequent Fields script for It's a Gift he asked for a "Joan Marsh type".) She was a versatile performer, capable of playing ingenues and "other women", sometimes essaying dialects.

In 1936, she sang on the CBS radio program Flying Red Horse Tavern.

By 1940 Joan Marsh went where the work was, and co-starred with John King in Blame It on Love, a promotional featurette for kitchen appliances. She continued to appear at various studios, being featured in major films and starring in minor ones. When she appeared as a gangster's moll in Universal's Little Tough Guys picture Keep 'Em Slugging, she became friendly with Huntz Hall and Bobby Jordan, who recruited her for their East Side Kids series at Monogram. After her featured roles in Mr. Muggs Steps Out (1943) and Follow the Leader (1944), she retired from the screen at the relatively young age of 30.

== Personal life ==
During the filming of Charlie Chan on Broadway, Marsh met writer Charles Belden, who had co-written the film's screenplay. They married on December 2, 1938, in Beverly Hills, California. Their marriage ended in divorce in 1943—first in Los Angeles, California, on August 26, 1943, followed by a second divorce on October 23, 1943, "so she won't have to wait a year before remarrying."

In 1943, Marsh married U. S. Army captain John D. W. Morrill in Santa Monica, California.

== Later years and death ==
Marsh later managed a stationery shop. She died at age 86 in Ojai, California on August 10, 2000.

== Partial filmography ==
- Hearts Aflame (1915) - Child
- A Little Princess (1917) - Child (uncredited)
- How Could You Jean? (1918) - Morley Child
- Johanna Enlists (1918) - (uncredited)
- The Bond (1918, Short) - Cupid (uncredited)
- Women's Weapons (1918) - Nicholas Jr.'s Sister
- Captain Kidd, Jr. (1919) - Child (uncredited)
- Daddy-Long-Legs (1919) - (uncredited)
- Pollyanna (1920) - Dorothy Rosher
- Suds (1920) - Minor Role (uncredited)
- Young Mrs. Winthrop (1920) - Rosie
- Thou Art the Man (1920) - Ellie Prescott
- Little Lord Fauntleroy (1921) - (uncredited)
- King of Jazz (1930) - Blonde ("A Bench in the Park") (uncredited)
- All Quiet on the Western Front (1930) - Poster Girl (uncredited)
- The Little Accident (1931) - Doris
- Inspiration (1931) - Madeleine Dorety
- Dance, Fools, Dance (1931) - Sylvia
- A Tailor Made Man (1931) - Beanie
- Meet the Wife (1931) - Doris Bellamy
- Three Girls Lost (1931) - Marcia Tallant
- Shipmates (1931) - Mary Lou
- Politics (1931) - Daisy Evans
- Maker of Men (1931) - Dorothy
- The Wet Parade (1932) - Evelyn Fessenden
- Are You Listening? (1932) - Honey O'Neil
- Bachelor's Affairs (1932) - Eva Mills
- That's My Boy (1932) - Co-ed (uncredited)
- Speed Demon (1932) - Jean Torrance
- High Gear (1933) - Anne Merritt
- Daring Daughters (1933) - Betty Cummings
- The Man Who Dared (1933) - Joan Novak
- It's Great to Be Alive (1933) - Toots
- Three-Cornered Moon (1933) - Kitty
- Rainbow Over Broadway (1933) - Judy Chibbins
- You're Telling Me! (1934) - Pauline Bisbee
- Many Happy Returns (1934) - Florence Allen
- We're Rich Again (1934) - Carolyn 'Carrie' Page
- Champagne for Breakfast (1935) - Vivian Morton
- Anna Karenina (1935) - Lili
- Dancing Feet (1936) - Judy Jones
- Brilliant Marriage (1936) - Madge Allison
- What Becomes of the Children? (1936) - Marion Worthington
- Charlie Chan on Broadway (1937) - Joan Wendall
- Hot Water (1937) - Bebe Montaine
- Life Begins in College (1937) - Cuddles
- The Lady Objects (1938) - June Lane
- Idiot's Delight (1939) - one of Harry Van's Les Blondes!
- Fast and Loose (1939) - Bobby Neville
- Blame It on Love (1940) - Terry Arden
- Road to Zanzibar (1941) - Dimples
- The Man in the Trunk (1942) - Yvonne Duvalle
- Police Bullets (1942) - Donna Wells
- Keep 'Em Slugging (1943) - Lola
- Secret Service in Darkest Africa (1943, Serial) - Janet Blake
- Mr. Muggs Steps Out (1943) - Brenda Murray
- Follow the Leader (1944) - Milly McGinnis (final film role)
