= Queen of the Amazons =

1947 film by Edward Finney

- Promotional film poster
- Directed by: Edward Finney
- Screenplay by: Roger Merton
- Story by: Roger Merton
- Produced by: Edward Finney executive Robert L. Lippert
- Starring: Robert Lowery; Patricia Morison; J. Edward Bromberg
- Narrated by: John Miljan
- Cinematography: Robert Pittack
- Edited by: John F. Link Sr.
- Music by: Lee Zahler
- Production company: Screen Art Pictures Corporation
- Distributed by: Screen Guild Productions Inc. (US); Exclusive Films (UK)
- Release date: January 15, 1947 (United States)
- Running time: 60 minutes
- Country: United States
- Language: English

Queen of the Amazons is a 1946 adventure film produced and directed by Edward Finney and featuring Robert Lowery, Patricia Morison and J. Edward Bromberg.

== Plot ==
Jean Preston (Patricia Morison) is determined to find her fiancé, Greg Jones (Bruce Edwards), who went on a safari and didn’t come back when expected. She travels to "Akbar", India, with Greg’s father, Colonel Jones (John Miljan), who also narrates the film, together with Wayne Monroe (Keith Richards) and the Professor (Wilson Benge). She asks about Jones at the front desk of the hotel where she stays. Although the clerk acts like he knows nothing of Jones, he immediately makes a suspicious phone call when the group leaves the lobby.

While Jean unpacks in her room, a native woman named Tondra (Vida Aldana), who spied on the group in the hotel lobby earlier, knocks on the door. She tells Jean that her husband, Moya (Hassam Kayyam), spoke to her of a safari that suffered a tiger attack. Jean asks Tondra to speak to her husband. Although apprehensive to get her husband at first, she quickly fetches her husband when Jean greases her palm. Tondra returns with Moya, who recognizes Jones from a photo of Jean’s. He tells Jean that Jones traveled not with the doomed safari but with a group of ivory hunters that went to Africa. Before Moya can say more, someone shoots him with a pistol through Jean’s room window. The shooting upsets the unstable locals and the group leaves for Africa.

They take a boat deep into the African jungle where they see abundant wildlife. Jean must convince Gary Lambert (Robert Lowery), who hates taking women on safaris, to be their guide. She knocks his socks off with her shooting skills. They also pick up famed safari cook, Gabby (J. Edward Bromberg), who likes to recite the poem "Three Fishers" to his pet monkey and tells stories of escaping his wife with belligerent verbosity. The District Commissioner of the area tells Lambert that Jones was on a mission to bust ivory poachers and wants Lambert to do the same, to which Lambert readily agrees.

The rescue mission meets with turmoil and death from an unknown saboteur among their ranks. A native man tells the group rumors of a group of white she-devils in the jungle that make their native guides skittish. The women came from a lifeboat from a shipwreck many years ago. When Greg is found, it is revealed he fell for the queen, Zita (Amira Moustafa).

== Cast ==
- Robert Lowery as Gary Lambert
- Patricia Morison as Jean Preston
- J. Edward Bromberg as Gabby
- John Miljan as Narrator / Colonel Jones
- Amira Moustafa as Zita, the Amazon Queen
- Keith Richards as Wayne Monroe
- Bruce Edwards as Greg Jones
- Wilson Benge as Professor
- Jack George as Commissioner
- Cay Forrester as Sugi
- Vida Aldana as Tondra
- Hassan Khayyam as Moya

== See also ==
- List of films in the public domain in the United States
