= Ladislaus Bus-Fekete =

Hungarian writer

- Born: 29 January 1896; Kecskemét, Austro-Hungarian Empire
- Died: 25 July 1971 (aged 75); Los Angeles, California, U.S.
- Other names: Leslie Bush-Fekete; László Bús-Fekete
- Occupations: Writer, journalist
- Years active: 1921–1965
- Spouse: Maria Fagyas (1925–1971) (his death)

Ladislaus Bus-Fekete (1896–1971) was a Hungarian playwright and journalist. A number of his works have been adapted into films including Ladies in Love, The Baroness and the Butler and Heaven Can Wait. He was of Jewish heritage and later also used the name as Leslie Bush-Fekete after emigrating to the United States. He worked on several screenplays in the United States. He was married to fellow author Maria Fagyas.

His play Lot's Wife became What's New Pussycat?.

== Selected filmography ==
- The Roadhouse Murder (1932, play), uncredited
- High and Low (1933, story)
- Cornflower (1934)
- Address Unknown (1935)
- Ladies in Love (1936, play)
- The Baroness and the Butler (1938, play)
- Lydia (1941)
- Appointment for Love (1941, story)
- Reunion in France (1942)
- Heaven Can Wait (1943, play)
- Casbah (1948)
- The Girl Next Door (1953, story)
- Pepe (1960, play)

== Bibliography ==
- Goble, Alan. The Complete Index to Literary Sources in Film. Walter de Gruyter, 1999.
- Rovit, Rebecca. The Jewish Kulturbund Theatre Company in Nazi Berlin. University of Iowa Press, 2012.
