= Charles S. Belden =

American screenwriter and journalist

Charles Spencer Belden (April 21, 1904 – November 3, 1954) was an American screenwriter and journalist, known for writing screenplays to several Charlie Chan films in the 1930s, notably Charlie Chan at the Opera (1936). His 1932 short story "The Wax Works" served as the basis for the 1933 film Mystery of the Wax Museum. He was married to stage actress Beth Milton in the early 1930s and to actress Joan Marsh who had starred in Charlie Chan on Broadway (1937), from 1938 to 1943. He was born in Montclair, New Jersey, and died in the Motion Picture Country Hospital, Los Angeles, at the age of 50.

== Screenplays ==
Charles S. Belden was a prolific screenwriter. While most known for the House of Wax franchise, he wrote other screenplays and stories which were the basis for movies and TV shows.

Movies based on his screenplays or stories:

- House of Wax (2005) story
- Waterfront (1954) TV Series, teleplay by, writer, 3 episodes
- Mr. & Mrs. North (1952) TV Series. written by (as Charles S. Belden), 1954, 2 episodes
- House of Wax (1953) story
- The Stu Erwin Show (1950) TV Series, teleplay, screenplay, 1951–1953, 4 episodes
- Hopalong Cassidy (1952) TV Series, screenplay, 2 episodes
- Racket Squad (1950) TV Series, teleplay, written by, 1951–1952, 7 episodes
- The Ford Television Theatre (1952) TV Series, story
- Mark Saber (1951) TV Series, written by
- The Ford Theatre Hour (1948) TV Series, play, 1951
- Double Deal (1950), screen play
- Million Dollar Weekend (1948), screenplay
- Borrowed Trouble (1948), original screenplay
- Silent Conflict (1948), original screenplay
- The Marauders (1947), original screenplay
- Beauty and the Bandit (1946), original screenplay
- South of Monterey (1946), screenplay
- The Gay Cavalier (1946), original story and screenplay
- The Strange Mr. Gregory (1945), writer
- Bullet Scars (1942), based on an idea by
- Sing Your Worries Away (1942), idea
- Tear Gas Squad (1940), writer
- Kid Nightingale (1939), screen play by
- On Dress Parade (1939), writer (uncredited)
- Playing with Dynamite (1939), screen play
- Charlie Chan in Honolulu (1938), original screenplay
- One Wild Night (1938), screenplay
- Mr. Moto's Gamble (1938), original screenplay
- Charlie Chan at Monte Carlo (1937), screen play
- Charlie Chan on Broadway (1937), screen play
- San Quentin (1937), contributor to treatment (uncredited)
- We Have Our Moments (1937), original story
- God's Country and the Woman (1937), story
- Charlie Chan at the Opera (1936), screen play
- Dracula's Daughter (1936), contributing writer (uncredited)
- The Murder of Dr. Harrigan (1936), dialogue
- The Widow from Monte Carlo (1935), writer
- A Shot in the Dark (1935), adaptation, screenplay
- Symphony of Living (1935), story and adaptation (as Charles Spencer Belden)
- Sons of Steel (1934), adaptation, story
- June Collyer in The Ghost Walks (1934), screen play
- The World Accuses (1934), adaptation, story
- Fugitive Road (1934), story and screenplay
- Fifteen Wives (1934), story and screenplay
- Mystery of the Wax Museum (1933), from the story by
- A Fool's Advice (1932), screenplay
