= Women's Weapons =

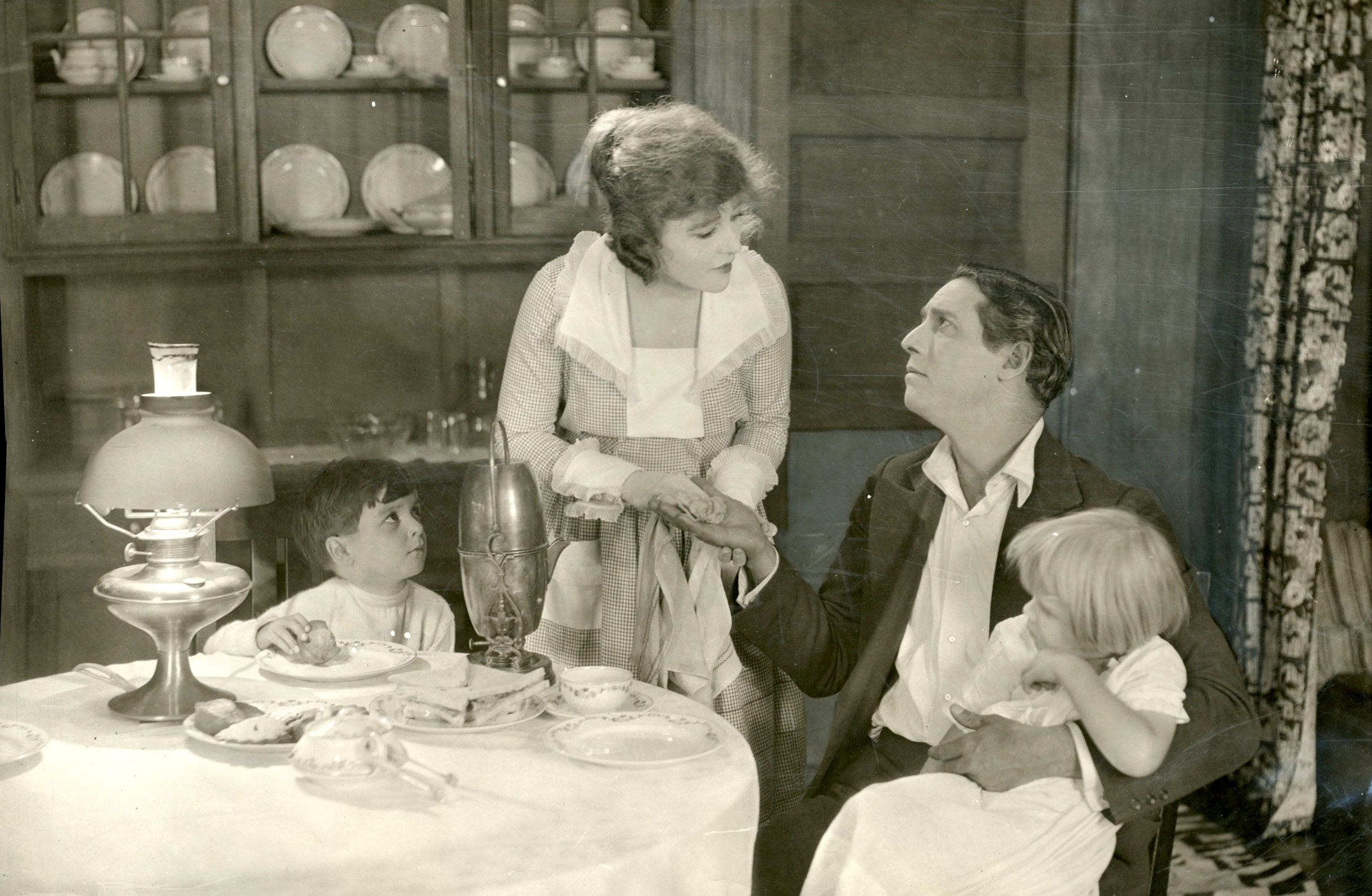
- Scene from the film
- Directed by: Robert G. Vignola
- Written by: Beulah Marie Dix
- Produced by: Adolph Zukor; Jesse Lasky
- Starring: Ethel Clayton
- Cinematography: Charles Schoenbaum
- Distributed by: Paramount Pictures
- Release date: November 24, 1918
- Running time: 5 reels (4,075 feet)
- Country: United States
- Language: Silent (English intertitles)

Women's Weapons is a lost 1918 American silent comedy-drama film directed by Robert G. Vignola and starring Ethel Clayton.

== Cast ==
- Ethel Clayton as Anne Elliot
- Elliott Dexter as Nicholas Elliot
- Vera Doria as Esmee Hale
- James Neill as Peter Gregory
- Josephine Crowell as Margaret
- Pat Moore as Nicholas, Jr.
- Joan Marsh as Nicholas, Jr.'s sister (credited as Dorothy Rosher)
