= Charlie Chan on Broadway =

1937 film by Eugene Forde

Charlie Chan On Broadway
- Directed by: Eugene Forde
- Screenplay by: Charles Belden; Jerome Cady
- Story by: Art Arthur; Robert Ellis; Helen Logan
- Produced by: John Stone
- Starring: Warner Oland; Keye Luke; Joan Marsh
- Cinematography: Harry Jackson
- Edited by: Alfred DeGaetano
- Music by: Samuel Kaylin
- Production company: 20th Century Fox
- Distributed by: 20th Century Fox
- Release date: October 8, 1937
- Running time: 68 minutes
- Country: United States
- Language: English

Charlie Chan on Broadway is a 1937 American mystery film directed by Eugene Forde and starring Warner Oland, Keye Luke and Joan Marsh. This is the 15th film starring Oland as Charlie Chan and produced by 20th Century Fox.

== Plot ==
While Charlie Chan and his number one son, Lee, are aboard a New York-bound transatlantic liner returning from Germany in their previous adventure (Charlie Chan at the Olympics), they have a run-in with a mysterious woman, named Billie Bronson, who secretes a package in the trunk of the Chans. After the liner docks, Chan and Lee are met at the pier by Inspector Nelson and two rival reporters, Joan Wendall and Speed Patton.

Billie, who left the country hurriedly a year ago when sought as a material witness in a political scandal, has returned to "blow the lid off the town". She follows the Chans to their hotel and attempts to regain her package from the trunk, only to be interrupted by Lee. She then goes to the "Hottentot Club", where "candid-camera night" is in full swing, followed by Lee. Already present are Joan and Speed. Billie is mysteriously murdered and Charlie is summoned from a police banquet in his honor. Present in the room with the body are club manager Johnny Burke; club dancer and Burke's girl-friend Marie Collins and the two reporters.

While Charlie seeks a motive for the murder, a second body is discovered in his hotel room, the package is missing from Charlie's trunk, and it is realized that it must have contained her diary. Charlie neatly puts together a few scattered clues and then springs a trap to confirm the identity of the killer. Lee's efforts to aid in the investigation earn him two black eyes, one from Johnny Burke and another from the murderer he tackles to save his father's life.

== Cast ==
- Warner Oland as Charlie Chan
- Keye Luke as Lee Chan
- Joan Marsh as Joan Wendall
- Marc Lawrence as Thomas Mitchell
- J. Edward Bromberg as Murdock
- Douglas Fowley as Johnny Burke
- Harold Huber as Chief Inspector James Nelson
- Donald Woods as Speed Patten
- Louise Henry as Billie Bronson
- Joan Woodbury as Marie Collins
- Leon Ames as Buzz Moran
- Eugene Borden as Louie
- Creighton Hale as Reporter (uncredited)

== Critical reception ==
A review of the film in The New York Times by Bosley Crowther noted that "the whole film carries through with speed, variety, and humor," that "Warner Oland handles Charlie with silken ease," and "the fact that Charlie finally solves the crime with the invaluable aid of a stack of candid camera pictures taken by a pack of 'hounds' [...] lends a humorous and topical twist which the snap-snap tribe will probably cherish." Variety reported that "the plausible deductions lend more credulity than usual to this typical yarn" and "Chan is again faithfully personated [by] Warner Oland, with just as much interest as ever being shown in his clever portrayal."

== Bibliography ==
- Backer, Ron. Mystery Movie Series of 1930s Hollywood. McFarland, 2012.
