= Young Mr. Lincoln =

1939 film by John Ford

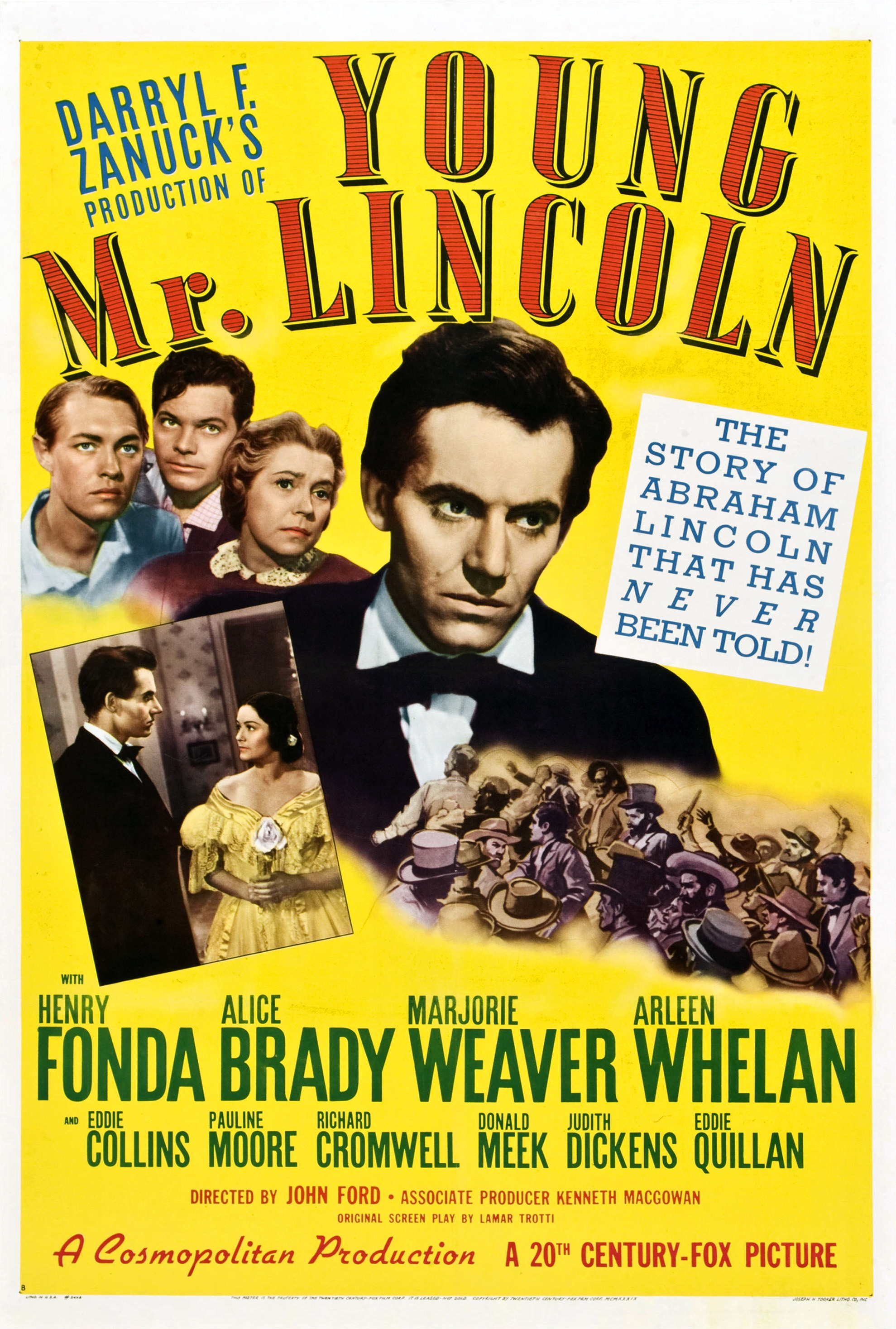
- Theatrical release poster
- Directed by: John Ford
- Written by: Lamar Trotti
- Produced by: Darryl F. Zanuck; Kenneth Macgowan
- Starring: Henry Fonda; Alice Brady; Marjorie Weaver; Arleen Whelan
- Cinematography: Bert Glennon
- Edited by: Walter Thompson
- Music by: Alfred Newman
- Production company: Cosmopolitan Productions
- Distributed by: 20th Century-Fox
- Release date: June 9, 1939
- Running time: 100 minutes
- Country: United States
- Language: English
- Budget: $1,500,000 (estimated)

Young Mr. Lincoln is a 1939 American biographical drama film about the early life of President Abraham Lincoln, directed by John Ford and starring Henry Fonda. Ford and producer Darryl F. Zanuck fought for control of the film, to the point where Ford destroyed unwanted takes for fear the studio would use them in the film. Screenwriter Lamar Trotti was nominated for an Academy Award for Best Writing/Original Story.

In 2003, Young Mr. Lincoln was selected for preservation in the United States National Film Registry by the Library of Congress as being "culturally, historically, or aesthetically significant".

== Plot ==
In 1832, a family traveling through New Salem, Illinois in their wagon need groceries from Lincoln's store, and the only thing of value that they have to trade is a barrel of old books including a law book, Blackstone's Commentaries. After thoroughly reading the book, Lincoln opts for the law after receiving encouragement from his early, ill-fated love, Ann Rutledge, who soon dies. Too poor to own even a horse, he arrives in Springfield, Illinois, on a mule and soon establishes a law practice in 1837 with his friend, John Stuart. After a raucous, day-long Independence Day celebration, a man, Skrub White, is killed after he pulled a gun in a fight. The accused are two brothers, Matt and Adam Clay. Lincoln prevents the lynching of the accused at the jail by shaming the angry, drunken mob. He also convinces it that he really needs the clients for his first real case.

Admiring his courage, Mary Todd invites Lincoln to her sister's soiree. Despite being aggressively courted by the very polished Stephen Douglas, Mary is interested in Lincoln. She faithfully attends the trial of the Clay boys, sits in the front row, and listens closely.

The boys' mother, Abigail Clay, who witnessed the end of the fight, and Lincoln are pressured by the prosecutor to save one of the brothers at the expense of the other's conviction. However, the key witness to the crime, J. Palmer Cass, is a friend of the victim who claims to have seen the murder at a distance of about 100 yards (91.4 meters) under the light of the moon: "It was moon bright". However, Lincoln persists and is able, by using an almanac, to demonstrate that on the night in question, the moon had set before the time of death. He then drives Cass to confess that he had actually stabbed his friend.

After Matt and Adam are acquited, Lincoln encounters Mary Todd and Douglas, the latter of whom apologizes for doubting him. Both agree to never underestimate the other. Later, the Clay family loads up their covered wagon, pay Lincoln the small sum of money they have, and leave town. Lincoln walks alone to the top of a hill as a storm approaches.

== Cast ==
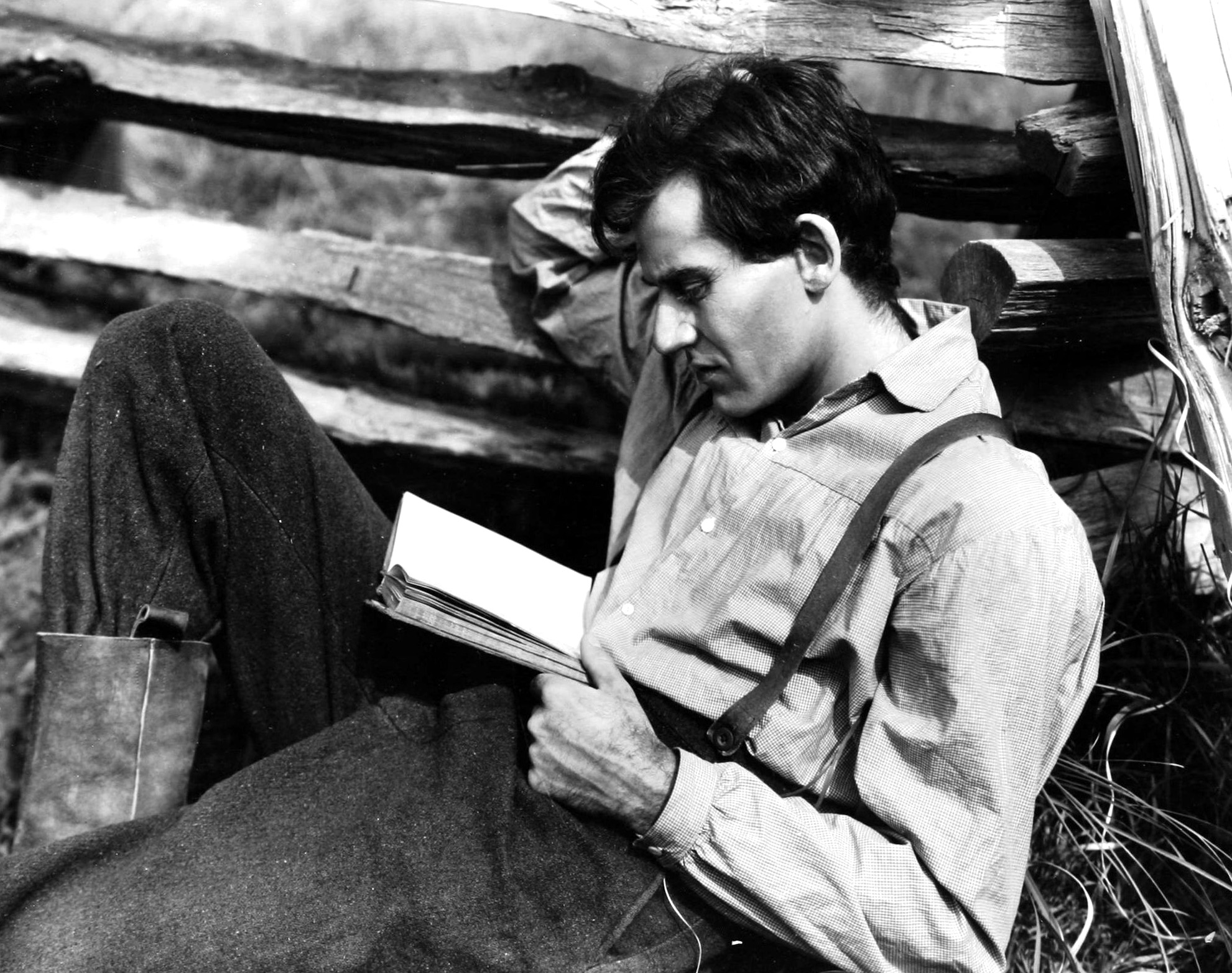
Henry Fonda as Abraham Lincoln

- Henry Fonda as Abraham Lincoln
- Alice Brady as Abigail Clay (final film role)
- Marjorie Weaver as Mary Todd
- Arleen Whelan as Sarah Clay
- Eddie Collins as Efe Turner
- Pauline Moore as Ann Rutledge
- Richard Cromwell as Matt Clay
- Donald Meek as Prosecutor John Felder
- Dorris Bowdon as Carrie Sue (Judith Dickens, who was obviously replaced by Bowden, is falsely credited)
- Eddie Quillan as Adam Clay
- Spencer Charters as Judge Herbert A. Bell
- Ward Bond as John Palmer Cass
- Milburn Stone as Stephen A. Douglas
- Cliff Clark as Sheriff Gil Billing
- Fred Kohler Jr. as Skrub White (uncredited)

== Background ==
The film has as its basis the murder case against William "Duff" Armstrong, which took place in 1858 at the courthouse in Beardstown, Illinois, the only courthouse in which Lincoln practiced law that is still in use. Lincoln proved the witness against the accused was lying about being able to see by the light of the Moon, using an almanac. Armstrong was acquitted.

The idea of moving the murder case to a much earlier period of Lincoln's life was anticipated by Edward Eggleston's novel The Graysons in 1888.

== Critical reception ==
In a favorable review for The New York Times, Frank Nugent wrote that the film's tableaux of scenes and characters gave the film "the right to be called Americana," and praised Fonda's performance:

Henry Fonda's characterization is one of those once-in-a-blue-moon things: a crossroads meeting of nature, art and a smart casting director. Nature gave Mr. Fonda long legs and arms, a strong and honest face and a slow smile; the make-up man added a new nose bridge.... [Fonda's] performance kindles the film, makes it a moving unity, at once gentle and quizzically comic.

In an essay that not only discusses the film, but also sheds light on the Soviet view of Lincoln's career and mythos, Russian filmmaker Sergei Eisenstein named Young Mr. Lincoln as the one American film that he most wishes he had made, lauding its "harmony," the "stylized daguerreotype manner" of its photography, and the sympathy and subtlety with which it portrays Lincoln, whom Eisenstein likens to Russian folk hero Ilya Muromets.

In her book, 5001 Nights at the Movies, Pauline Kael wrote positively about the film: "One of John Ford's most memorable films, and not at all the tedious bummer that the title might suggest. . . . Henry Fonda, in one of his best early performances, is funny and poignant as the drawling, awkward young hero."

== Adaptations ==
Young Mr. Lincoln was adapted as a radio play on the July 10, 1946, episode of Academy Award Theater.

The Village Theatre of Everett and Issaquah, Washington has commissioned a new musical based on the film titled Lincoln in Love, book and lyrics by Peter S. Kellogg and music by David Friedman.

== See also ==
- List of American films of 1939
- List of films with a 100% rating on Rotten Tomatoes, a film review aggregator website
