= Maxine Lewis =

American entertainment producer

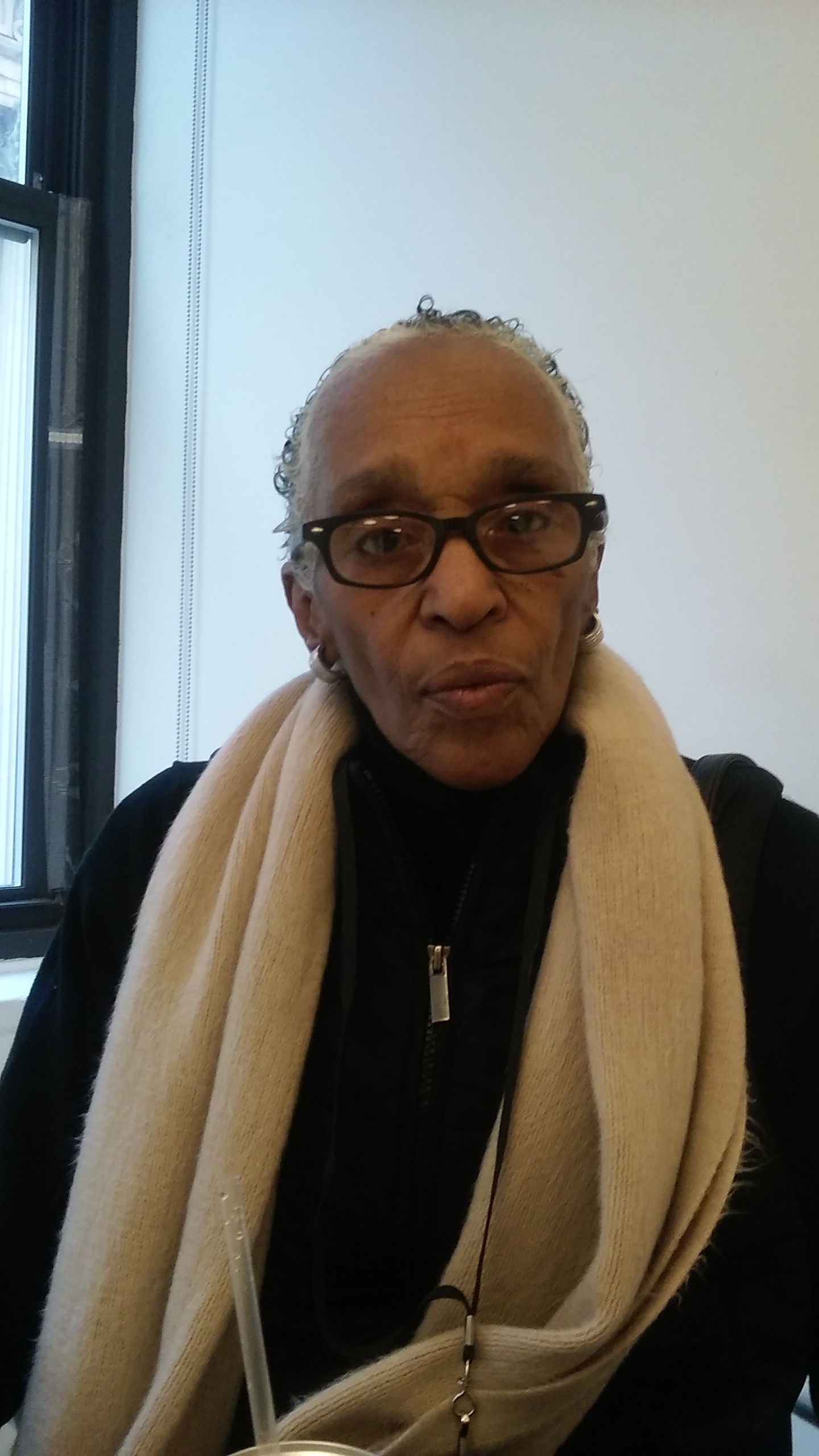
- Born: Harlem, New York City, New York
- Occupation: Entertainment Producer

Maxine Lewis is a producer, talent scout, and event planner for Harlem's Amateur Night (Showtime at the Apollo). She was Percy Sutton's spokeswoman. Percy Sutton was a Harlem leader and co-founder of the Inner City Broadcasting Corporation. The Inner City group was founded in 1970. It was founded by a group of prominent African-American New Yorkers, such as Clarence Benjamin Jones, Hal Jackson, Carl McCall, Wilbert Tatum, David Dinkins, Betty Shabazz, and other shareholders that were active in business, community civic involvements and development. Percy Sutton was a long term Manhattan Borough president and was a high-ranking black elected official in New York City. He was a civil rights lawyer, an entrepreneur and freedom rider. The Inner City Broadcasting Corporation bought WLIB-AM, one of the city's first African American owned radio stations. Maxine Lewis starting working for Percy Sutton in the early 80s. Sutton produced It's Showtime at the Apollo, a syndicated, music television show first broadcast on September 12, 1987.

She has worked for the Apollo theatre for decades as a producer for Showtime at the Apollo, and Apollo Kids at the Apollo Theater in Harlem. She has been an organizer for over 21 years for the 154/153 streets' Extended Family Reunion in Harlem, an event that brings residents from the neighborhood and residents that used to live in the area in July of each year.

== Early life ==
She was born and raised in Harlem, New York City.

== Career ==
Maxine Lewis is a Special Events Producer for Diamonds in the Rough Independent Entertainment since 1986.

Percy Sutton was the founder of Inner City Broadcasting Corporation. Which bought the Apollo Theatre in 1981. They rescued the Apollo Theatre from bankruptcy Court. The theatre was refurbished. She served as Percy Sutton's Executive Assistant for 19 years.

In 1992, Maxine organized and produced a memorial tribute for tap dancer Charles Coles known as Charles "Honi" Coles at the Apollo Theatre. She began working for Inner City Broadcasting Corporation in 1982. In 1984 she became the talent coordinator for amateur segments for Showtime at the Apollo and later segment producer for "Apollo Kids" segments for over 14 years. She traveled across the country looking for talent to be showcased. Some well known artists that she showcased were: Lyfe Jennings, Jermaine Paul, Ne-Yo, Jazmine Sullivan, Lauren Hill, Canton Jones, Jessica Care Moore, and more. She has a featured segment on 90.3 WHCR FM radio for Street Corner Resources giving information and updates about resources and activities for adults. She has been a community volunteer serving food for years for Thanksgiving and Christmas at the National Action Network in Harlem. She is a member of Perfecting Faith Church in Freeport, Long Island, where she utilizes her skills for community service in special events organizing and public relations work.

== Awards ==
2015 - Senior Citizen's Day by the New York State Office for the Aging for her community work honored for Community Service.

2015 - Senator Díaz of the Bronx, New York City presents a Senior Citizen of the Year proclamation to Maxine Lewis

2014 - Fannie Lou Hamer Honoree: for her work at the National Action Network National Crisis Manager (North Jersey Chapter)
