= Maryland (1940 film) =

1940 film

- Film poster
- Directed by: Henry King
- Written by: Jack Andrews; Ethel Hill
- Starring: Walter Brennan; Fay Bainter; Brenda Joyce
- Cinematography: George Barnes
- Edited by: Barbara McLean
- Production company: Twentieth Century-Fox
- Distributed by: Twentieth Century-Fox
- Release date: July 19, 1940
- Running time: 92 minutes
- Country: United States
- Language: English

Maryland is a 1940 American drama film directed by Henry King. It stars Walter Brennan and Fay Bainter.

== Plot ==
After her husband dies, wealthy Charlotte Danfield sells off his entire stable of horses, and forbids son Lee to ride again.

He remains close to trainer William Stewart, though, and upon returning from Europe, where he has been sent to school, Lee decides to ride William's horse Cavalier in the Maryland Cup over his mother's objections.

== Cast ==
- Walter Brennan as William Stewart
- Fay Bainter as Charlotte Danfield
- Brenda Joyce as Linda
- John Payne as Lee Danfield
- Charles Ruggles as Dick Piper
- Hattie McDaniel as Aunt Carrie
- Marjorie Weaver as Georgie Tomlin
- Sidney Blackmer as Spencer Danfield
- Ben Carter as Shadrach
- Ernest Whitman as Dogface
- Paul Harvey as Buckman
- Spencer Charters as Judge

== See also ==
- List of films about horses
- List of films about horse racing
