= Second Honeymoon (1937 film) =

1937 film by Walter Lang

- Theatrical release poster
- Directed by: Walter Lang
- Written by: Kathryn Scola; Darrell Ware
- Story by: Philip Wylie
- Produced by: Raymond Griffith
- Starring: Tyrone Power; Loretta Young; Stuart Erwin
- Cinematography: Ernest Palmer
- Edited by: Walter Thompson
- Music by: Cyril J. Mockridge
- Production company: 20th Century Fox
- Distributed by: 20th Century Fox
- Release date: November 13, 1937
- Running time: 84 minutes
- Country: United States
- Language: English

Second Honeymoon is a 1937 American screwball romantic comedy film directed by Walter Lang and starring Tyrone Power, Loretta Young and Stuart Erwin. Based on a story by Philip Wylie it was distributed by Twentieth Century-Fox. A comedy of remarriage, it was overshadowed by the similar The Awful Truth released the same year.

In 1942, Twentieth Century-Fox released another film based on the same source, entitled Springtime in the Rockies, which was directed by Irving Cummings and starred Betty Grable, John Payne, Carmen Miranda and Cesar Romero.

== Plot ==
The newly remarried Vicky (Loretta Young) is on vacation in Palm Beach with her second husband Bob Benton (Lyle Talbot) a Yale-man. One night Vicky finds her first husband Raoul McLiesh (Tyrone Power) on the terrace of the ballroom, and they skip between kissing as if they never divorced and the distant way of two not married people. As he is introduced to her second husband Bob, they have a certain complicity against Vicky, and McLiesh not only finds himself with a valet - Leo MacTavish (Stuart Erwin) - but also with a raccoon, sent him from Bob. He decides to stay at the hotel as his first wife seems more beautiful than ever. The next evening McLiesh brings a young girl - a cigarette-girl met on the road somewhere, Joy (Marjorie Weaver), who makes Vicky jealous, as her husband flirts with her. While businessman husband Bob has to leave, Vicky and Raoul get closer.

"You're the only real thing that ever happened to me. Don't let me go this time, please don't!" Vicky says one night to Raoul. And while Raoul's valet Leo McTavish marries Joy, Bob, Vicky and Raoul are in a storm of emotions trying to find their way to one or another.

== Cast ==
- Tyrone Power as Raoul McLiesh
- Loretta Young as Vicky
- Stuart Erwin as Leo MacTavish
- Claire Trevor as Marcia
- Marjorie Weaver as Joy
- Lyle Talbot as Bob Benton
- J. Edward Bromberg as Herbie
- Paul Hurst as Dennis Huggins
- Jayne Regan as Paula
- Hal K. Dawson as Andy
- Mary Treen as Elsie

== Bibliography ==
- Dick, Bernard F. Hollywood Madonna: Loretta Young. University Press of Mississippi, 2011.
