= List of 20th Century Fox films (1935–1999) =

This is a list of films released, produced, and/or distributed by 20th Century Fox (now 20th Century Studios) from 1935 until 1999.

== 1930s ==
=== 1935 ===
Release date	Title	Notes
June 1, 1935	Under the Pampas Moon	
June 7, 1935	Doubting Thomas	
June 14, 1935	Black Sheep	
June 21, 1935	Charlie Chan in Egypt	
July 1, 1935	Hard Rock Harrigan	
July 5, 1935	Ginger	
July 19, 1935	Silk Hat Kid	
July 26, 1935	Curly Top	
August 2, 1935	The Farmer Takes a Wife	
August 9, 1935	Call of the Wild	distributed by United Artists; produced by 20th Century Pictures
August 10, 1935	Orchids to You	
August 16, 1935	Dressed to Thrill	
August 23, 1935	Dante's Inferno	
August 30, 1935	Redheads on Parade	
September 6, 1935	Steamboat Round the Bend	
September 6, 1935	Angelina o el honor de un brigadier	in Spanish
September 13, 1935	The Gay Deception	
September 20, 1935	Thunder in the Night	
September 27, 1935	Thunder Mountain	
October 4, 1935	Here's to Romance	
October 11, 1935	Charlie Chan in Shanghai	
October 15, 1935	Rosa de Francia	in Spanish
October 18, 1935	This Is the Life	
October 25, 1935	Way Down East	
October 25, 1935	Bad Boy	
November 1, 1935	Music Is Magic	
November 1, 1935	Te quiero con locura	Fox's last in Spanish
November 8, 1935	Metropolitan	20th Century Fox's first production.
November 14, 1935	The Man Who Broke the Bank at Monte Carlo	
November 15, 1935	Thanks a Million	
November 22, 1935	In Old Kentucky	
November 29, 1935	Navy Wife	
December 6, 1935	Show Them No Mercy!	
December 13, 1935	Your Uncle Dudley	
December 20, 1935	Whispering Smith Speaks	
December 27, 1935	The Littlest Rebel	

=== 1936 ===
Release date	Title	Notes
January 3, 1936	King of Burlesque	
January 10, 1936	Charlie Chan's Secret	
January 17, 1936	Paddy O'Day	
January 24, 1936	Professional Soldier	
January 31, 1936	My Marriage	
February 7, 1936	Every Saturday Night	
February 14, 1936	It Had to Happen	
February 21, 1936	Here Comes Trouble	
February 28, 1936	The Prisoner of Shark Island	
March 6, 1936	The Country Doctor	
March 13, 1936	Song and Dance Man	
March 20, 1936	Everybody's Old Man	
March 27, 1936	Charlie Chan at the Circus	
March 27, 1936	O'Malley of the Mounted	
April 3, 1936	Gentle Julia	
April 10, 1936	A Message to Garcia	distribution only; produced by 20th Century Pictures
April 17, 1936	Captain January	
April 17, 1936	L'homme des Folies Bergère	in French, originally released in 1935; produced by 20th Century Pictures
April 24, 1936	The Country Beyond	
May 1, 1936	Under Two Flags	
May 8, 1936	Champagne Charlie	
May 15, 1936	The First Baby	
May 22, 1936	Half Angel	
June 5, 1936	Private Number	
June 12, 1936	Little Miss Nobody	
June 19, 1936	Human Cargo	
June 19, 1936	Sins of Man	
June 26, 1936	The Crime of Dr. Forbes	
July 3, 1936	White Fang	
July 3, 1936	The Border Patrolman	
July 10, 1936	Educating Father	
July 17, 1936	High Tension	
July 24, 1936	Poor Little Rich Girl	
July 24, 1936	36 Hours to Kill	
August 1, 1936	To Mary – with Love	
August 7, 1936	Charlie Chan at the Race Track	
August 14, 1936	Girls' Dormitory	
August 21, 1936	Sing, Baby, Sing	
August 28, 1936	Star for a Night	
September 4, 1936	The Road to Glory	
September 11, 1936	Pepper	
September 11, 1936	King of the Royal Mounted	
September 18, 1936	Back to Nature	
September 25, 1936	Ramona	Fox's first all-three-strip Technicolor feature film.
October 2, 1936	Thank You, Jeeves!	
October 9, 1936	Ladies in Love	
October 16, 1936	Dimples	
October 23, 1936	Pigskin Parade	
October 30, 1936	15 Maiden Lane	
November 6, 1936	Under Your Spell	
November 6, 1936	Wild Brian Kent	
November 13, 1936	Can This Be Dixie?	
November 20, 1936	Reunion	
November 27, 1936	White Hunter	
December 11, 1936	Banjo on My Knee	
December 11, 1936	Laughing at Trouble	
December 18, 1936	Career Woman	
December 25, 1936	Stowaway	

=== 1937 ===
Release date	Title	Notes
January 1, 1937	One in a Million	
January 8, 1937	Charlie Chan at the Opera	
January 8, 1937	As You Like It	
January 15, 1937	Secret Valley	
January 15, 1937	Crack-Up	
January 22, 1937	Woman-Wise	
January 29, 1937	Lloyd's of London	
February 5, 1937	The Holy Terror	
February 12, 1937	On the Avenue	
February 19, 1937	Wings of the Morning	
February 19, 1937	Off to the Races	
February 26, 1937	Love Is News	
March 5, 1937	Fair Warning	
March 12, 1937	Nancy Steele Is Missing!	
March 19, 1937	Time Out for Romance	
March 26, 1937	Seventh Heaven	
April 2, 1937	Midnight Taxi	
April 9, 1937	Step Lively, Jeeves!	
April 16, 1937	Fifty Roads to Town	
April 23, 1937	Wake Up and Live	
April 30, 1937	That I May Live	
May 7, 1937	Cafe Metropole	
May 7, 1937	It Happened Out West	
May 14, 1937	The Great Hospital Mystery	
May 21, 1937	Charlie Chan at the Olympics	
May 21, 1937	Under the Red Robe	
May 28, 1937	This Is My Affair	
June 4, 1937	Angel's Holiday	
June 18, 1937	Big Business	
June 25, 1937	Sing and Be Happy	
July 2, 1937	Slave Ship	
July 2, 1937	She Had to Eat	
July 9, 1937	Born Reckless	
July 16, 1937	The Californian	
July 23, 1937	The Lady Escapes	
July 30, 1937	Wee Willie Winkie	
August 6, 1937	You Can't Have Everything	
August 13, 1937	One Mile from Heaven	
August 20, 1937	Love Under Fire	
August 27, 1937	Think Fast, Mr. Moto	
August 27, 1937	Western Gold	
September 3, 1937	Thin Ice	
September 3, 1937	Borneo	
September 10, 1937	Wild and Woolly	
September 17, 1937	Wife, Doctor and Nurse	
September 24, 1937	Hot Water	
October 1, 1937	Life Begins in College	
October 8, 1937	Lancer Spy	
October 8, 1937	Roll Along, Cowboy	
October 15, 1937	Heidi	
October 22, 1937	Charlie Chan on Broadway	
October 29, 1937	Ali Baba Goes to Town	
November 5, 1937	Danger – Love at Work	
November 12, 1937	Dangerously Yours	
November 13, 1937	Second Honeymoon	
November 26, 1937	45 Fathers	
November 26, 1937	Dinner at the Ritz	
December 3, 1937	Big Town Girl	
December 10, 1937	Borrowing Trouble	
December 24, 1937	Thank You, Mr. Moto	
December 31, 1937	Love and Hisses	

=== 1938 ===
Release date	Title	Notes
January 7, 1938	Tarzan's Revenge	
January 7, 1938	City Girl	
January 14, 1938	Change of Heart	
January 14, 1938	Hawaiian Buckaroo	
January 21, 1938	Charlie Chan at Monte Carlo	
January 28, 1938	Happy Landing	
February 4, 1938	International Settlement	
February 11, 1938	Checkers	
February 18, 1938	The Baroness and the Butler	
March 4, 1938	Sally, Irene and Mary	
March 4, 1938	Love on a Budget	
March 11, 1938	Walking Down Broadway	
March 18, 1938	Rebecca of Sunnybrook Farm	
March 25, 1938	Mr. Moto's Gamble	
April 1, 1938	Island in the Sky	
April 8, 1938	Rawhide	
April 15, 1938	In Old Chicago	Nominated for the Academy Award for Best Picture. co-production with Darryl F. Zanuck Productions
April 22, 1938	Battle of Broadway	
April 29, 1938	Four Men and a Prayer	
May 6, 1938	A Trip to Paris	
May 13, 1938	Kentucky Moonshine	
May 20, 1938	Rascals	
May 27, 1938	Kidnapped	
June 3, 1938	Josette	
June 10, 1938	One Wild Night	
June 17, 1938	Three Blind Mice	
June 24, 1938	Mr. Moto Takes a Chance	
July 1, 1938	Always Goodbye	
July 8, 1938	We're Going to Be Rich	
July 8, 1938	Panamint's Bad Man	
July 15, 1938	Passport Husband	
July 22, 1938	I'll Give a Million	
July 29, 1938	Little Miss Broadway	
August 5, 1938	Gateway	
August 12, 1938	Keep Smiling	
August 16, 1938	Alexander's Ragtime Band	Nominated for Academy Award for Best Picture.
August 26, 1938	Speed to Burn	
September 2, 1938	My Lucky Star	
September 9, 1938	Safety in Numbers	
September 16, 1938	Hold That Co-ed	
September 23, 1938	Time Out for Murder	
September 30, 1938	Straight, Place and Show	
October 7, 1938	Meet the Girls	
October 14, 1938	Five of a Kind	
October 21, 1938	Mysterious Mr. Moto	
October 28, 1938	Suez	
October 28, 1938	Always in Trouble	
November 11, 1938	Just Around the Corner	
November 18, 1938	Sharpshooters	
November 25, 1938	Submarine Patrol	
December 2, 1938	Road Demon	
December 9, 1938	Up the River	
December 16, 1938	Down on the Farm	
December 23, 1938	Thanks for Everything	
December 30, 1938	Kentucky	

=== 1939 ===
Release date	Title	Notes
January 6, 1939	While New York Sleeps	
January 13, 1939	Charlie Chan in Honolulu	
January 20, 1939	Mr. Moto's Last Warning	
January 20, 1939	Smiling Along	
January 27, 1939	Jesse James	
January 27, 1939	Tail Spin	
February 11, 1939	The Arizona Wildcat	
February 17, 1939	The Three Musketeers	
February 24, 1939	Pardon Our Nerve	
March 3, 1939	Wife, Husband and Friend	
March 10, 1939	Inside Story	
March 17, 1939	The Little Princess	In the public domain
March 24, 1939	Everybody's Baby	
March 31, 1939	The Hound of the Baskervilles (Note: Owned by Paramount Pictures (via CBS))	distribution only
April 7, 1939	Mr. Moto in Danger Island	
April 14, 1939	The Story of Alexander Graham Bell	
April 21, 1939	Winner Take All	
April 21, 1939	Inspector Hornleigh	
April 28, 1939	The Return of the Cisco Kid	
May 5, 1939	Chasing Danger	
May 12, 1939	Rose of Washington Square	
May 19, 1939	Boy Friend	
May 26, 1939	The Gorilla	In the public domain
June 2, 1939	The Jones Family in Hollywood	
June 9, 1939	Young Mr. Lincoln	Inducted into the National Film Registry in 2003.
June 16, 1939	Charlie Chan in Reno	
June 23, 1939	Susannah of the Mounties	
June 30, 1939	It Could Happen to You	
July 7, 1939	Mr. Moto Takes a Vacation	
July 14, 1939	Second Fiddle	
July 21, 1939	News Is Made at Night	
July 21, 1939	The Ware Case	
July 28, 1939	Frontier Marshal	
August 4, 1939	Hotel for Women	
August 11, 1939	Chicken Wagon Family	
August 18, 1939	Stanley and Livingstone	
August 25, 1939	Quick Millions	
September 1, 1939	The Adventures of Sherlock Holmes	distribution only
September 8, 1939	Charlie Chan at Treasure Island	
September 15, 1939	The Rains Came	
September 22, 1939	Stop, Look and Love	
September 29, 1939	Here I Am a Stranger	
October 6, 1939	The Escape	
October 13, 1939	Hollywood Cavalcade	
October 20, 1939	Pack Up Your Troubles	
October 27, 1939	20,000 Men a Year	
November 3, 1939	Heaven with a Barbed Wire Fence	
November 10, 1939	Drums Along the Mohawk	
November 17, 1939	Too Busy to Work	
November 24, 1939	Day-Time Wife	
December 1, 1939	Charlie Chan in City in Darkness	
December 1, 1939	Inspector Hornleigh on Holiday	
December 8, 1939	Barricade	
December 15, 1939	The Honeymoon's Over	
December 22, 1939	Everything Happens at Night	
December 29, 1939	The Cisco Kid and the Lady	
December 30, 1939	Swanee River	

== 1940s ==
=== 1940 ===
Release date	Title	Notes
January 12, 1940	City of Chance	
January 15, 1940	The Blue Bird	
January 19, 1940	He Married His Wife	
January 26, 1940	High School	
February 2, 1940	The Man Who Wouldn't Talk	
February 9, 1940	Little Old New York	
February 16, 1940	Young as You Feel	
February 23, 1940	They Came by Night	
March 1, 1940	Charlie Chan in Panama	
March 15, 1940	The Grapes of Wrath	Nominated for the Academy Award for Best Picture. Inducted into the National Film Registry in 1989.
March 29, 1940	Free, Blonde and 21	
April 5, 1940	Star Dust	
April 12, 1940	Viva Cisco Kid	
April 19, 1940	Johnny Apollo	
April 26, 1940	Shooting High	distribution only
May 3, 1940	So This Is London	
May 10, 1940	I Was an Adventuress	
May 17, 1940	On Their Own	
May 24, 1940	Lillian Russell	
May 31, 1940	Girl in 313	
June 7, 1940	Earthbound	
June 14, 1940	Four Sons	
June 21, 1940	Charlie Chan's Murder Cruise	
June 28, 1940	Lucky Cisco Kid	
July 5, 1940	Sailor's Lady	
July 12, 1940	Manhattan Heartbeat	
July 19, 1940	Maryland	
August 2, 1940	The Man I Married	
August 9, 1940	Girl from Avenue A	
August 16, 1940	The Return of Frank James	
August 23, 1940	Pier 13	
August 30, 1940	Young People	
September 6, 1940	Charlie Chan at the Wax Museum	
September 13, 1940	Public Deb No. 1	
September 20, 1940	Yesterday's Heroes	
September 27, 1940	Brigham Young	
October 4, 1940	The Gay Caballero	
October 11, 1940	Down Argentine Way	Inducted into the National Film Registry in 2014.
October 18, 1940	Night Train to Munich	Made in the UK by 20th Century Fox
October 25, 1940	The Great Profile	
November 8, 1940	The Mark of Zorro	Inducted into the National Film Registry in 2009.
November 15, 1940	Street of Memories	
November 22, 1940	Youth Will Be Served	
November 29, 1940	Tin Pan Alley	
December 6, 1940	Charter Pilot	
December 13, 1940	Murder Over New York	
December 20, 1940	Jennie	
December 25, 1940	Chad Hanna	

=== 1941 ===
Release date	Title	Notes
January 3, 1941	Hudson's Bay	
January 10, 1941	Michael Shayne, Private Detective	
January 17, 1941	Romance of the Rio Grande	
January 24, 1941	Tall, Dark and Handsome	
January 31, 1941	The Girl in the News	
February 7, 1941	Ride, Kelly, Ride	
February 14, 1941	Golden Hoofs	
February 21, 1941	Western Union	
February 28, 1941	Murder Among Friends	
March 7, 1941	Tobacco Road	
March 14, 1941	Sleepers West	
March 28, 1941	Dead Men Tell	
April 4, 1941	Scotland Yard	
April 11, 1941	That Night in Rio	
April 18, 1941	Ride on Vaquero	
May 9, 1941	The Great American Broadcast	
May 16, 1941	The Cowboy and the Blonde	
May 30, 1941	Blood and Sand	
June 6, 1941	For Beauty's Sake	
June 13, 1941	The Great Commandment	
June 20, 1941	Man Hunt	
June 27, 1941	A Very Young Lady	
June 27, 1941	The Bride Wore Crutches	
July 4, 1941	Moon Over Miami	
July 11, 1941	Accent on Love	
July 18, 1941	Dance Hall	
July 25, 1941	Mail Train	
August 1, 1941	Charley's Aunt	
August 8, 1941	Dressed to Kill	
August 15, 1941	Wild Geese Calling	
August 22, 1941	Private Nurse	
August 29, 1941	Sun Valley Serenade	
September 5, 1941	Charlie Chan in Rio	
September 12, 1941	Belle Starr	
September 19, 1941	We Go Fast	
September 26, 1941	Man at Large	
September 26, 1941	Last of the Duanes	
October 3, 1941	A Yank in the R.A.F.	
October 10, 1941	Great Guns	
October 10, 1941	Riders of the Purple Sage	
October 17, 1941	Week-End in Havana	
October 23, 1941	Swamp Water	
October 24, 1941	Moon Over Her Shoulder	
October 31, 1941	I Wake Up Screaming	
November 7, 1941	Small Town Deb	
November 21, 1941	Rise and Shine	
November 28, 1941	Cadet Girl	
November 28, 1941	Marry the Boss's Daughter	
December 12, 1941	Confirm or Deny	
December 19, 1941	The Perfect Snob	
December 26, 1941	How Green Was My Valley	Winner of the Academy Award for Best Picture. Inducted into the National Film Registry in 1990.

=== 1942 ===
Release date	Title	Notes
January 2, 1942	Remember the Day	
January 9, 1942	Blue, White and Perfect	
January 16, 1942	A Gentleman at Heart	
January 23, 1942	Right to the Heart	
January 29, 1942	Son of Fury: The Story of Benjamin Blake	
February 6, 1942	Young America	
February 13, 1942	On the Sunny Side	
February 20, 1942	Roxie Hart	
February 27, 1942	Castle in the Desert	
March 6, 1942	The Night Before the Divorce	
March 13, 1942	Song of the Islands	
March 20, 1942	Lone Star Ranger	
March 20, 1942	Rings on Her Fingers	
March 24, 1942	To the Shores of Tripoli	
March 27, 1942	Sundown Jim	
April 3, 1942	Secret Agent of Japan	
April 17, 1942	Who Is Hope Schuyler?	
April 30, 1942	My Gal Sal	
May 1, 1942	The Man Who Wouldn't Die	
May 12, 1942	This Above All	
May 15, 1942	The Mad Martindales	
May 17, 1942	Whispering Ghosts	
May 24, 1942	Kipps	The Remarkable Mr. Kipps
May 27, 1942	Prelude to War	
May 28, 1942	It Happened in Flatbush	
May 29, 1942	Moontide	
June 12, 1942	The Magnificent Dope	
June 19, 1942	Thru Different Eyes	
June 26, 1942	Ten Gentlemen from West Point	
July 3, 1942	The Postman Didn't Ring	
July 10, 1942	United We Stand	
August 1, 1942	Footlight Serenade	
August 7, 1942	A-Haunting We Will Go	
August 14, 1942	Little Tokyo, U.S.A.	
August 21, 1942	The Pied Piper	Nominated for the Academy Award for Best Picture.
August 28, 1942	The Loves of Edgar Allan Poe	
September 4, 1942	Orchestra Wives	
September 11, 1942	Berlin Correspondent	
September 18, 1942	Careful, Soft Shoulders	
September 18, 1942	The Man in the Trunk	
September 21, 1942	Iceland	
September 24, 1942	Tales of Manhattan	
September 25, 1942	Just Off Broadway	
October 9, 1942	Girl Trouble	
October 16, 1942	Manila Calling	
October 19, 1942	Dr. Renault's Secret	
November 6, 1942	Springtime in the Rockies	
November 13, 1942	That Other Woman	
November 20, 1942	Thunder Birds	
November 27, 1942	The Undying Monster	
December 4, 1942	The Black Swan	
December 9, 1942	China Girl	
December 13, 1942	We Are the Marines	
December 25, 1942	Life Begins at Eight-Thirty	

=== 1943 ===
Release date	Title	Notes
January 11, 1943	Immortal Sergeant	
January 15, 1943	Over My Dead Body	
January 22, 1943	Time to Kill	
February 5, 1943	Chetniks! The Fighting Guerrillas	
February 12, 1943	The Meanest Man in the World	
February 19, 1943	Margin for Error	
February 26, 1943	The Young Mr. Pitt	Made in the UK
March 12, 1943	Dixie Dugan	
March 19, 1943	Quiet Please, Murder	
March 26, 1943	Hello, Frisco, Hello	
April 2, 1943	He Hired the Boss	
April 9, 1943	The Moon Is Down	
April 13, 1943	Desert Victory	
April 23, 1943	My Friend Flicka	
April 28, 1943	Crash Dive	
April 30, 1943	Tonight We Raid Calais	
May 7, 1943	They Came to Blow Up America	
May 21, 1943	The Ox-Bow Incident	Nominated for the Academy Award for Best Picture. Inducted into the National Film Registry in 1998.
June 11, 1943	Jitterbugs	
June 18, 1943	Coney Island	
July 21, 1943	Stormy Weather	Inducted into the National Film Registry in 2001.
August 6, 1943	Bomber's Moon	
August 13, 1943	Heaven Can Wait	Nominated for the Academy Award for Best Picture.
August 27, 1943	Holy Matrimony	
September 17, 1943	Wintertime	
October 1, 1943	Sweet Rosie O'Grady	
October 15, 1943	Paris After Dark	
October 27, 1943	Guadalcanal Diary	
November 4, 1943	Claudia	
November 11, 1943	The Battle of Russia	
November 19, 1943	The Dancing Masters	
December 3, 1943	Happy Land	
December 21, 1943	The Song of Bernadette	Nominated for the Academy Award for Best Picture.
December 24, 1943	The Gang's All Here	Inducted into the National Film Registry in 2014.
December 24, 1943	Jane Eyre	

=== 1944 ===
Release date	Title	Notes
January 7, 1944	The Lodger	
January 28, 1944	Lifeboat	
February 3, 1944	The Fighting Sullivans	
February 23, 1944	The Purple Heart	
March 17, 1944	Four Jills in a Jeep	
April 10, 1944	Tampico	
April 25, 1944	Pin Up Girl	
April 28, 1944	Buffalo Bill	
May 1, 1944	Bermuda Mystery	
May 22, 1944	The Eve of St. Mark	
May 25, 1944	Ladies of Washington	
June 3, 1944	Roger Touhy, Gangster	
June 15, 1944	Home in Indiana	
July 17, 1944	Take It or Leave It	
July 28, 1944	Wing and a Prayer	
July 30, 1944	Candlelight in Algeria	
August 1, 1944	Wilson	Nominated for the Academy Award for Best Picture.
September 21, 1944	Sweet and Low-Down	
September 22, 1944	The Big Noise	
September 22, 1944	In the Meantime, Darling	
September 27, 1944	Greenwich Village	
October 11, 1944	Laura	Inducted into the National Film Registry in 1999.
November 1, 1944	Something for the Boys	
November 7, 1944	Irish Eyes Are Smiling	
December 8, 1944	Sunday Dinner for a Soldier	
December 15, 1944	The Keys of the Kingdom	
December 21, 1944	The Fighting Lady	
December 22, 1944	Winged Victory	

=== 1945 ===
Release date	Title	Notes
February 7, 1945	Hangover Square	
February 28, 1945	A Tree Grows in Brooklyn	Inducted into the National Film Registry in 2010.
March 15, 1945	Thunderhead, Son of Flicka	
April 11, 1945	A Royal Scandal	
April 22, 1945	Circumstantial Evidence	
May 2, 1945	Diamond Horseshoe	
May 11, 1945	The Bullfighters	
May 23, 1945	Where Do We Go from Here?	
May 25, 1945	Molly and Me	
June 1, 1945	Don Juan Quilligan	
June 3, 1945	The Way Ahead	USA distribution only; a Two Cities Films production (UK)
June 13, 1945	Nob Hill	
June 16, 1945	Junior Miss	
June 19, 1945	Captain Eddie	
June 21, 1945	A Bell for Adano	
June 29, 1945	The Caribbean Mystery	
July 13, 1945	Within These Walls	
August 30, 1945	State Fair	
October 18, 1945	The House on 92nd Street	
October 31, 1945	And Then There Were None	
November 14, 1945	The Dolly Sisters	
December 14, 1945	Fallen Angel	
December 25, 1945	A Walk in the Sun	Inducted into the National Film Registry in 2016.
December 31, 1945	Doll Face	
December 1945	The Spider	

=== 1946 ===
Release date	Title	Notes
January 4, 1946	Leave Her to Heaven	Inducted into the National Film Registry in 2018.
January 24, 1946	Colonel Effingham's Raid	
February 1, 1946	Shock	
February 15, 1946	Behind Green Lights	
February 25, 1946	Claudia and David	
March 3, 1946	I Live in Grosvenor Square	distribution only
March 1946	Sentimental Journey	
April 5, 1946	Johnny Comes Flying Home	
April 19, 1946	Dragonwyck	
May 6, 1946	Rendezvous 24	Distribution only, produced by Sol M. Wurtzel Productions
May 8, 1946	The Dark Corner	
May 17, 1946	Do You Love Me?	
May 17, 1946	Strange Triangle	
June 3, 1946	Cluny Brown	
June 12, 1946	Somewhere in the Night	
June 20, 1946	Anna and the King of Siam	
June 26, 1946	Smoky	
July 1946	It Shouldn't Happen to a Dog	
August 1, 1946	Deadline for Murder	Distribution only, produced by Sol M. Wurtzel Productions
August 29, 1946	Black Beauty	
August 1946	Centennial Summer	
September 2, 1946	If I'm Lucky	
September 25, 1946	Three Little Girls in Blue	
October 2, 1946	Home Sweet Homicide	
October 3, 1946	Strange Journey	Distribution only, produced by Sol M. Wurtzel Productions
October 16, 1946	Margie	
November 2, 1946	Wanted for Murder	
November 27, 1946	Dangerous Millions	Distribution only, produced by Sol M. Wurtzel Productions
December 2, 1946	Wake Up and Dream	
December 3, 1946	My Darling Clementine	Inducted into the National Film Registry in 1991.
December 25, 1946	The Razor's Edge	Nominated for the Academy Award for Best Picture. Remade in 1984.

=== 1947 ===
Release date	Title	Notes
January 4, 1947	The Shocking Miss Pilgrim	
January 15, 1947	13 Rue Madeleine	
February 6, 1947	The Brasher Doubloon	
March 1, 1947	Backlash	Distribution only, produced by Sol M. Wurtzel Productions
March 5, 1947	Boomerang	
March 20, 1947	The Late George Apley	
March 28, 1947	Carnival in Costa Rica	
May 4, 1947	The Homestretch	
May 27, 1947	Jewels of Brandenburg	Distribution only, produced by Sol M. Wurtzel Productions
May 30, 1947	Moss Rose	
June 11, 1947	Miracle on 34th Street	Nominated for the Academy Award for Best Picture. Inducted into the National Film Registry in 2005. Remade in 1994.
June 26, 1947	The Ghost and Mrs. Muir	
July 2, 1947	The Crimson Key	Distribution only, produced by Sol M. Wurtzel Productions
July 18, 1947	Second Chance	Distribution only, produced by Sol M. Wurtzel Productions
August 15, 1947	I Wonder Who's Kissing Her Now	
September 24, 1947	The Foxes of Harrow	
September 1947	Kiss of Death	Remade of 1995
September 1947	Mother Wore Tights	
October 15, 1947	The Invisible Wall	Distribution only, produced by Sol M. Wurtzel Productions
October 22, 1947	Forever Amber	
October 28, 1947	Nightmare Alley	
November 1, 1947	Thunder in the Valley	
November 10, 1947	Roses Are Red	Distribution only, produced by Sol M. Wurtzel Productions
November 11, 1947	Gentleman's Agreement	Winner of the Academy Award for Best Picture. Inducted into the National Film Registry in 2017.
December 7, 1947	Dangerous Years	Distribution only, produced by Sol M. Wurtzel Productions
December 25, 1947	Captain from Castile	
December 25, 1947	Daisy Kenyon	

=== 1948 ===
Release date	Title	Notes
January 3, 1948	The Tender Years (Note: Owned by Universal Pictures (via DreamWorks Classics)) (Note: Owned by Shout! Studios (via Westchester Films))	distribution only
January 14, 1948	An Ideal Husband	U.S. distribution only; produced by London Films in the UK
February 1, 1948	You Were Meant for Me	
February 27, 1948	Let's Live Again	
March 10, 1948	Sitting Pretty	
March 1948	Call Northside 777	
March 1948	Half Past Midnight	Distribution only, produced by Sol M. Wurtzel Productions
April 2, 1948	The Challenge	
April 7, 1948	Arthur Takes Over	Distribution only, produced by Sol M. Wurtzel Productions
April 14, 1948	Scudda Hoo! Scudda Hay!	
April 27, 1948	Anna Karenina	USA distribution; produced by British Lion and London Films
April 30, 1948	Fury at Furnace Creek	
April 30, 1948	13 Lead Soldiers	Distribution only, produced by Reliance Pictures
May 12, 1948	The Iron Curtain	
May 17, 1948	Meet Me at Dawn	
May 28, 1948	The Counterfeiters	distribution only
June 3, 1948	Green Grass of Wyoming	
June 8, 1948	The Winner's Circle	
June 22, 1948	Give My Regards to Broadway	
July 14, 1948	The Street with No Name	
July 16, 1948	The Checkered Coat	Distribution only, produced by Belsam Productions
July 22, 1948	Deep Waters	
July 30, 1948	Escape	
July 30, 1948	Fighting Back	Distribution only, produced by Sol M. Wurtzel Productions
August 4, 1948	The Walls of Jericho	
August 24, 1948	That Lady in Ermine	
September 1, 1948	The Creeper	distribution only; produced by Reliance Pictures
September 1, 1948	Night Wind	Distribution only, produced by Sol M. Wurtzel Productions
September 2, 1948	The Gay Intruders	
September 15, 1948	The Luck of the Irish	
September 24, 1948	Jungle Patrol	
September 29, 1948	Cry of the City	
October 1, 1948	Apartment for Peggy	
November 4, 1948	Road House	
November 13, 1948	The Snake Pit	Nominated for the Academy Award for Best Picture.
November 15, 1948	Belle Starr's Daughter	distribution only; produced by Edward Alperson Productions
November 17, 1948	Bungalow 13	distribution only; produced by Belsam Productions
November 23, 1948	When My Baby Smiles at Me	
December 10, 1948	Unfaithfully Yours	
December 24, 1948	Yellow Sky	
December 25, 1948	That Wonderful Urge	
December 31, 1948	Trouble Preferred	distribution only; produced by Sol M. Wurtzel Productions

=== 1949 ===
Release date	Title	Notes
January 4, 1949	This Was a Woman	USA distribution only; produced in United Kingdom by Excelsior Films Ltd.
January 18, 1949	Chicken Every Sunday	
January 18, 1949	Mine Own Executioner	USA distribution only; produced in United Kingdom by London Films
February 3, 1949	A Letter to Three Wives	Nominated for the Academy Award for Best Picture.
February 11, 1949	Miss Mink of 1949	distribution only; produced by Sol M. Wurtzel Productions
February 22, 1949	Down to the Sea in Ships	
March 4, 1949	I Cheated the Law	distribution only; produced by Belsam Productions
March 8, 1949	A Man About the House	
March 12, 1949	Mother Is a Freshman	
April 1, 1949	The Fan	
April 15, 1949	Mr. Belvedere Goes to College	
April 27, 1949	Tucson	distribution only; produced by Sol M. Wurtzel Productions
May 3, 1949	The Forbidden Street	
May 19, 1949	Canadian Pacific (Note: Owned by Video-Cinema Films, Inc., with U.S. distribution rights currently licensed to Ignite Films, Corinth Films and Samuel Goldwyn Films)	distribution only; produced by Nat Holt Productions
June 1949	The Beautiful Blonde from Bashful Bend	
June 1949	It Happens Every Spring	
July 1, 1949	House of Strangers	
August 1, 1949	You're My Everything	
August 4, 1949	Sand	
August 11, 1949	Slattery's Hurricane	
August 26, 1949	I Was a Male War Bride	
September 1949	Come to the Stable	
October 10, 1949	Thieves' Highway	
October 12, 1949	Father Was a Fullback	
October 25, 1949	Everybody Does It	
November 11, 1949	Oh, You Beautiful Doll	
November 16, 1949	Fighting Man of the Plains	distribution only; produced by Nat Holt Productions
November 1949	Pinky	
December 2, 1949	Dancing in the Dark	
December 21, 1949	Twelve O'Clock High	Nominated for the Academy Award for Best Picture. Inducted into the National Film Registry in 1998.
December 23, 1949	Prince of Foxes	Made at Cinecittà, Rome and on location in Italy

== 1950s ==
=== 1950 ===
Release date	Title	Notes
January 13, 1950	Whirlpool	
February 17, 1950	When Willie Comes Marching Home	
February 17, 1950	Dakota Lil	distribution only; produced by Alson Productions
February 20, 1950	Three Came Home	
March 1, 1950	The Great Rupert	
March 3, 1950	Mother Didn't Tell Me	
March 17, 1950	Under My Skin	
March 31, 1950	Wabash Avenue	
April 26, 1950	The Big Lift	
April 28, 1950	Cheaper by the Dozen	
May 19, 1950	A Ticket to Tomahawk	
June 6, 1950	Love That Brute	
June 9, 1950	Night and the City	Made in the UK
June 23, 1950	The Gunfighter	
August 1, 1950	The Cariboo Trail	distribution only; produced by Nat Holt Productions
August 1950	Stella	
August 1950	Broken Arrow	
August 1950	Where the Sidewalk Ends	
September 1950	No Way Out	
September 1, 1950	The Black Rose	
September 2, 1950	Farewell to Yesterday	
September 15, 1950	My Blue Heaven	
September 15, 1950	Panic in the Streets	
September 29, 1950	Mister 880	
October 2, 1950	I'll Get By	
October 7, 1950	The Fireball (Note: Owned by Warner Bros. (via Turner Entertainment Co.))	distribution only, produced by Bert E. Friedlob Productions and Thor Productions
October 12, 1950	Two Flags West	
October 27, 1950	All About Eve	Winner of the Academy Award for Best Picture. Inducted into the National Film Registry in 1990.
November 1, 1950	The Jackpot	
November 8, 1950	American Guerrilla in the Philippines	
November 28, 1950	The Mudlark	
December 15, 1950	For Heaven's Sake	
December 26, 1950	The Man Who Cheated Himself	distribution only, produced by Jack M. Warner for Phoenix Films

=== 1951 ===
Release date	Title	Notes
January 4, 1951	Halls of Montezuma	
January 31, 1951	Call Me Mister	
February 14, 1951	Of Men and Music	
February 17, 1951	I'd Climb the Highest Mountain	
February 21, 1951	The 13th Letter	
February 23, 1951	You're in the Navy Now	
March 3, 1951	Lucky Nick Cain	USA distribution only, made in United Kingdom by Kaydor Productions
March 3, 1951	The Sword of Monte Cristo	distribution only, produced by Edward L. Alperson Productions
March 6, 1951	Fourteen Hours	
March 14, 1951	Bird of Paradise	
March 25, 1951	Rawhide	
April 5, 1951	I Can Get It for You Wholesale	
April 25, 1951	Follow the Sun	
May 5, 1951	Half Angel	
May 12, 1951	The House on Telegraph Hill	
May 1951	On the Riviera	
June 15, 1951	As Young as You Feel	
June 29, 1951	The Frogmen	
July 18, 1951	Take Care of My Little Girl	
August 1, 1951	Mr. Belvedere Rings the Bell	
August 3, 1951	The Secret of Convict Lake	
August 10, 1951	David and Bathsheba	
August 15, 1951	Meet Me After the Show	
August 16, 1951	The Guy Who Came Back	
August 29, 1951	People Will Talk	
September 2, 1951	A Millionaire for Christy	distribution only, produced by Thor Productions
September 21, 1951	No Highway in the Sky	
September 28, 1951	Journey into Light	distribution only; produced by Joseph Bernhard Productions
September 28, 1951	The Day the Earth Stood Still	Inducted into the National Film Registry in 1995.
October 10, 1951	Love Nest	
October 17, 1951	The Desert Fox: The Story of Rommel	
October 18, 1951	Anne of the Indies	
November 1951	The Model and the Marriage Broker	
November 1, 1951	Golden Girl	
November 6, 1951	Let's Make It Legal	
November 23, 1951	Elopement	
December 1, 1951	The Girl on the Bridge	distribution only, produced by Hugo Haas Productions
December 6, 1951	Fixed Bayonets!	
December 7, 1951	I'll Never Forget You	
December 21, 1951	Decision Before Dawn	Nominated for the Academy Award for Best Picture.

=== 1952 ===
Release date	Title	Notes
January 23, 1952	Red Skies of Montana	
January 28, 1952	Rose of Cimarron	distribution only, produced by Edward L. Alperson Productions
January 29, 1952	Japanese War Bride	distribution only, produced by Joseph Bernhard Productions
February 13, 1952	Return of the Texan	
February 13, 1952	Viva Zapata!	
February 15, 1952	Phone Call from a Stranger	
February 22, 1952	5 Fingers	
March 14, 1952	Deadline – U.S.A.	
April 4, 1952	With a Song in My Heart	Winner of the Golden Globe Award for Best Motion Picture – Musical or Comedy.
May 2, 1952	The Pride of St. Louis	
May 2, 1952	Belles on Their Toes	
May 16, 1952	The Outcasts of Poker Flat	
June 2, 1952	Lydia Bailey	
June 13, 1952	Diplomatic Courier	
June 1952	Kangaroo	
July 4, 1952	Lady in the Iron Mask (Note: Owned by Warner Bros.)	distribution only, produced by Walter Wanger Productions
July 11, 1952	We're Not Married!	
July 18, 1952	Don't Bother to Knock	
July 25, 1952	What Price Glory	
July 26, 1952	Dreamboat	
July 1952	Wait till the Sun Shines, Nellie	
August 14, 1952	Les Misérables	
September 5, 1952	Monkey Business	
September 26, 1952	Night Without Sleep	
October 3, 1952	Lure of the Wilderness	
October 10, 1952	My Wife's Best Friend	
October 16, 1952	Way of a Gaucho	
October 16, 1952	O. Henry's Full House	
October 23, 1952	The Snows of Kilimanjaro	In the public domain
November 12, 1952	The Steel Trap	distribution only, produced by Thor Productions
November 14, 1952	Bloodhounds of Broadway	
November 14, 1952	Something for the Birds	
November 27, 1952	The Thief of Venice	USA distribution only, produced in Italy by Robert Haggiag for Sparta Films
December 1, 1952	My Pal Gus	
December 11, 1952	The Star	distribution only, produced by Thor Productions
December 19, 1952	Pony Soldier	
December 22, 1952	Stars and Stripes Forever	Nominated for the Golden Globe Award for Best Motion Picture – Musical or Comedy.
December 25, 1952	My Cousin Rachel	
December 25, 1952	Ruby Gentry (Note: Owned by Disney (via ABC, but have since 2019 reunited with its original distributor 20th Century Fox now known as 20th Century Studios))	

=== 1953 ===
Release date	Title	Notes
January 14, 1953	The I Don't Care Girl	
January 26, 1953	Tonight We Sing	
February 4, 1953	The Silver Whip	
February 4, 1953	Treasure of the Golden Condor	
February 1953	Niagara	
March 1, 1953	Down Among the Sheltering Palms	
March 4, 1953	Taxi	
March 20, 1953	Destination Gobi	
April 1, 1953	Call Me Madam	
April 18, 1953	Titanic	
April 22, 1953	Invaders from Mars	distribution only, produced by Edward L. Alperson Productions; Inducted into the National Film Registry in 2024
May 13, 1953	The Girl Next Door	not to be confused with the unrelated 2004 film of the same name, which was also released by 20th Century Fox.
May 20, 1953	The Desert Rats	
May 20, 1953	The Glory Brigade	
May 21, 1953	The President's Lady	
May 27, 1953	Pickup on South Street	Inducted into the National Film Registry in 2018.
June 4, 1953	Man on a Tightrope	
June 12, 1953	The Farmer Takes a Wife	
June 17, 1953	Powder River	
June 29, 1953	The Kid from Left Field	
July 1, 1953	White Witch Doctor	
July 25, 1953	Sailor of the King	
August 7, 1953	Dangerous Crossing	
August 12, 1953	Inferno	
August 1953	Gentlemen Prefer Blondes	First released film in an open matte process. Also, the first film shot using open matte.
September 2, 1953	Mister Scoutmaster	
September 16, 1953	The Robe	First released film in Cinemascope process.
September 23, 1953	Thy Neighbor's Wife	distribution only, produced by Hugo Haas Productions
September 1953	A Blueprint for Murder	
October 5, 1953	Vicki	
October 20, 1953	City of Bad Men	
November 20, 1953	How to Marry a Millionaire	The first film shot using Cinemascope
November 1953	Miss Robin Crusoe	
December 2, 1953	Beneath the 12-Mile Reef	
December 2, 1953	Man Crazy	
December 22, 1953	King of the Khyber Rifles	
December 31, 1953	Man in the Attic	distribution only, produced by Panoramic Productions

=== 1954 ===
Release date	Title	Notes
January 16, 1954	Three Young Texans	distribution only, produced by Panoramic Productions
February 6, 1954	Hell and High Water	
March 3, 1954	Racing Blood	
March 6, 1954	New Faces	distribution only, produced by Edward L. Alperson Productions
March 12, 1954	Night People	
April 5, 1954	Prince Valiant	
April 30, 1954	River of No Return	
April 1954	The Rocket Man	distribution only, produced by Panoramic Productions
May 1, 1954	Siege at Red River	distribution only, produced by Panoramic Productions
May 1954	Gorilla at Large	distribution only, produced by Panoramic Productions
May 1954	Three Coins in the Fountain	Nominated for the Academy Award for Best Picture.
June 18, 1954	Demetrius and the Gladiators	
July 7, 1954	The Royal Tour of Queen Elizabeth and Philip	
July 9, 1954	Garden of Evil	
July 1954	Princess of the Nile	distribution only, produced by Panoramic Productions
August 4, 1954	The Gambler from Natchez	distribution only, produced by Panoramic Productions
August 4, 1954	The Raid	distribution only, produced by Panoramic Productions
August 24, 1954	The Egyptian	
September 25, 1954	Broken Lance	
September 30, 1954	Woman's World	
October 1, 1954	The Adventures of Hajji Baba	co-production with Walter Wanger Productions
October 28, 1954	Carmen Jones	distribution only; produced by Carlyle Productions; Winner of the Golden Globe Award for Best Motion Picture – Musical or Comedy. Inducted into the National Film Registry in 1992.
October 28, 1954	Black Widow	Remade in 1987
November 1, 1954	The Outlaw's Daughter	distribution only, produced by Alplee Productions
November 7, 1954	Black 13	USA distribution only, made in United Kingdom by Vandyke Pictures
November 17, 1954	Désirée	
December 2, 1954	The Other Woman	distribution only, produced by Hugo Haas Productions
December 7, 1954	Devil's Harbor	
December 16, 1954	There's No Business Like Show Business	

=== 1955 ===
Release date	Title	Notes
January 11, 1955	Prince of Players	
February 4, 1955	The Racers	
February 16, 1955	White Feather	
March 1, 1955	Untamed	
March 31, 1955	A Man Called Peter	
April 20, 1955	Violent Saturday	
May 5, 1955	Daddy Long Legs	
May 11, 1955	That Lady	
May 16, 1955	Green Magic	
May 17, 1955	The Adventures of Sadie	USA distribution only, made in United Kingdom by Renown Pictures
May 24, 1955	The Magnificent Matador	distribution only, produced by Edward L. Alperson Productions
May 27, 1955	Soldier of Fortune	
June 3, 1955	Angela	
June 3, 1955	The Seven Year Itch	
July 1, 1955	House of Bamboo	
July 1, 1955	A Life in the Balance	
July 22, 1955	The Virgin Queen	
July 22, 1955	How to Be Very, Very Popular	
August 18, 1955	Love Is a Many-Splendored Thing	Nominated for the Academy Award for Best Picture.
September 21, 1955	The Left Hand of God	
September 21, 1955	Seven Cities of Gold	
September 22, 1955	The Tall Men	
October 1, 1955	The Girl in the Red Velvet Swing	
October 11, 1955	Oklahoma! (Note: Owned by Concord Originals and the estates of Rodgers and Hammerstein, with distribution rights currently licensed to Samuel Goldwyn Films)	Inducted into the National Film Registry in 2007.
October 13, 1955	The Deep Blue Sea	Produced in the UK by London Films; distribution only
November 4, 1955	The View from Pompey's Head	
November 23, 1955	Good Morning, Miss Dove	
December 14, 1955	The Rains of Ranchipur	

=== 1956 ===
Release date	Title	Notes
January 11, 1956	The Lieutenant Wore Skirts	
February 1, 1956	The Bottom of the Bottle	
February 16, 1956	Carousel	
March 29, 1956	On the Threshold of Space	
April 1, 1956	Mohawk	distribution only, produced by Edward L. Alperson Productions
April 3, 1956	The Man Who Never Was	Produced in the UK by Sumar Productions; distribution only
May 1, 1956	The Proud Ones	
May 4, 1956	The Revolt of Mamie Stover	
May 8, 1956	The Man in the Gray Flannel Suit	
May 8, 1956	Hilda Crane	
May 18, 1956	23 Paces to Baker Street	
May 29, 1956	D-Day the Sixth of June	
June 1, 1956	Massacre	co-production with Lippert Pictures
June 18, 1956	Abdullah's Harem	distribution only
June 28, 1956	The King and I	Nominated for the Academy Award for Best Picture. Winner of the Golden Globe Award for Best Motion Picture – Musical or Comedy.
August 2, 1956	Bigger Than Life	
August 10, 1956	The Queen of Babylon	
August 31, 1956	Bus Stop	Nominated for the Golden Globe Award for Best Motion Picture – Musical or Comedy.
September 21, 1956	The Last Wagon	
September 28, 1956	The Best Things in Life Are Free	
October 11, 1956	Between Heaven and Hell	
November 1956	The Desperados Are in Town (Note: Owned by Paramount Pictures (via Melange Pictures))	Distribution only; produced by Regal Films
November 1, 1956	Teenage Rebel	
November 15, 1956	Love Me Tender	
December 1956	Three Brave Men	
December 1956	The Women of Pitcairn Island	Distribution only; produced by Regal Films
December 1956	The Black Whip	Distribution only; produced by Regal Films
December 1, 1956	The Girl Can't Help It	
December 13, 1956	Stagecoach to Fury	Distribution only; produced by Regal Films
December 13, 1956	Anastasia	Made in Copenhagen, Paris and Borehamwood, UK. Remade in 1997.

=== 1957 ===
Release date	Title	Notes
January 1957	The Quiet Gun	Distribution only; produced by Regal Films
February 22, 1957	Oh, Men! Oh, Women!	
March 1957	The Storm Rider	Distribution only; produced by Regal Films
March 13, 1957	Heaven Knows, Mr. Allison	
April 1957	She Devil	Distribution only, produced by Regal Films
April 1957	Kronos	Distribution only, produced by Regal Films
April 11, 1957	The River's Edge	Distribution only; produced by Benedict Bogeaus
April 17, 1957	Oasis	
April 19, 1957	Boy on a Dolphin	
May 1957	The Restless Breed	Distribution only, produced by Edward L. Alperson Productions
May 1957	Lure of the Swamp	Distribution only; produced by Regal Films
May 1, 1957	Desk Set	
May 1, 1957	Badlands of Montana	Distribution only; produced by Regal Films
May 10, 1957	The Way to the Gold	
May 22, 1957	The True Story of Jesse James	
May 22, 1957	China Gate	Distribution only; produced by Globe Enterprises
May 27, 1957	The Wayward Bus	
June 1957	Two Grooms for a Bride	
June 12, 1957	Smiley	
June 12, 1957	Island in the Sun	
July 1957	The Abductors	Distribution only; produced by Regal Films and The Griffin Company
July 1957	God Is My Partner	Distribution only; produced by Regal Films
July 1957	Apache Warrior	Distribution only; produced by Regal Films
July 17, 1957	A Hatful of Rain	Nominated for the Golden Globe Award for Best Motion Picture – Drama.
July 19, 1957	An Affair to Remember	co-production with Jerry Wald Productions
July 24, 1957	Bernardine	
July 29, 1957	Will Success Spoil Rock Hunter?	Inducted into the National Film Registry in 2000.
August 1, 1957	Hell on Devil's Island	Distribution only; produced by Regal Films
August 12, 1957	The Unknown Terror	Distribution only; produced by Regal Films and Emirau Productions
August 12, 1957	Back from the Dead	Distribution only; produced by Regal Films and Emirau Productions
August 23, 1957	The Sun Also Rises	
September 1957	Copper Sky	Distribution only; produced by Regal Films and Emirau Productions
September 10, 1957	Forty Guns	co-production with Globe Enterprises
September 10, 1957	The Deerslayer	Distribution only; produced by Regal Films
September 23, 1957	Under Fire	Distribution only; produced by Regal Films
September 23, 1957	The Three Faces of Eve	
October 1957	Ghost Diver	Distribution only; produced by Regal Films
October 16, 1957	Sea Wife	
October 30, 1957	Young and Dangerous	Distribution only; produced by Regal Films
October 30, 1957	Rockabilly Baby	Distribution only; produced by Regal Films
October 30, 1957	No Down Payment	
October 31, 1957	The Abominable Snowman of the Himalayas	USA distribution, produced by Hammer Film Productions
November 24, 1957	Ride a Violent Mile	Distribution only; produced by Regal Films and Emirau Productions
November 27, 1957	April Love	
December 1957	Escape from Red Rock	Distribution only; produced by Regal Films
December 5, 1957	Plunder Road	Distribution only; produced by Regal Films
December 10, 1957	Kiss Them for Me	co-production with Jerry Wald Productions
December 13, 1957	Peyton Place	Nominated for the Academy Award for Best Picture.
December 14, 1957	A Farewell to Arms	
December 25, 1957	The Enemy Below	
December 26, 1957	Stopover Tokyo	

=== 1958 ===
Release date	Title	Notes
February 5, 1958	Beautiful But Dangerous	
February 11, 1958	The Gift of Love	
February 21, 1958	Sing, Boy, Sing	
February 21, 1958	Diamond Safari	co-production Regal Films and Schlesinger Organization
February 1958	Cattle Empire	Produced by Emirau Productions
March 1958	Count Five and Die	
March 1958	Ambush at Cimarron Pass	Distribution only; produced by Regal Films
March 19, 1958	South Pacific	Nominated for the Golden Globe Award for Best Motion Picture – Musical.
April 1, 1958	Blood Arrow	Distribution only; produced by Regal Films and Emirau Productions
April 2, 1958	The Young Lions	
April 3, 1958	The Long, Hot Summer	
May 1, 1958	Showdown at Boot Hill	Distribution only; produced by Regal Films
May 22, 1958	Ten North Frederick	
May 1958	Thundering Jets	Distribution only; produced by Regal Films
June 1958	The Naked Earth	
June 1, 1958	From Hell to Texas	
June 6, 1958	Space Master X-7	Distribution only; produced by Regal Films
June 8, 1958	Fraulein	
June 25, 1958	The Bravados	
June 25, 1958	Desert Hell	Distribution only; produced by Regal Films and Emirau Productions
July 1958	Wolf Dog	Distribution only; produced by Regal Films
July 1958	Gang War	Distribution only; produced by Regal Films
July 1958	Sierra Baron	
July 16, 1958	The Fly	
July 23, 1958	Rx Murder	
July 31, 1958	A Certain Smile	
August 1, 1958	The Fiend Who Walked the West	
August 1, 1958	Flaming Frontier	
September 18, 1958	Harry Black and the Tiger	
September 30, 1958	The Barbarian and the Geisha	
September 1958	The Hunters	
October 15, 1958	The Roots of Heaven	
October 31, 1958	In Love and War	
October 1958	Villa	
November 18, 1958	Mardi Gras	
December 1, 1958	Frontier Gun	Distribution only; produced by Regal Films
December 1, 1958	A Nice Little Bank That Should Be Robbed	
December 11, 1958	The Inn of the Sixth Happiness	Made in the UK
December 23, 1958	Rally Round the Flag, Boys!	

=== 1959 ===
Release date	Title	Notes
January 1, 1959	I Mobster	distribution only, produced by Alco Productions
February 11, 1959	Alaska Passage	
February 20, 1959	The Remarkable Mr. Pennypacker	
March 1959	The Sad Horse	
March 1959	The Little Savage	
March 1, 1959	Lone Texan	Distribution only; produced by Regal Films
March 14, 1959	The Sheriff of Fractured Jaw	
March 18, 1959	The Diary of Anne Frank	Nominated for the Academy Award for Best Picture. Nominated for the Golden Globe Award for Best Motion Picture – Drama.
March 27, 1959	The Sound and the Fury	
March 31, 1959	Intent to Kill	
April 1, 1959	Compulsion	
April 15, 1959	Warlock	
April 30, 1959	Smiley Gets a Gun	
May 6, 1959	These Thousand Hills	
May 27, 1959	Woman Obsessed	
June 1959	Here Come the Jets	
June 19, 1959	Say One for Me	
July 1959	The Son of Robin Hood	
July 1959	The Alligator People	
July 1959	Return of the Fly	
July 24, 1959	Holiday for Lovers	
July 27, 1959	The Miracle of the Hills	
July 30, 1959	Blue Denim	
August 14, 1959	A Private's Affair	
September 1959	The Oregon Trail	
September 4, 1959	The Blue Angel	
September 23, 1959	Five Gates to Hell	
October 2, 1959	The Man Who Understood Women	
October 9, 1959	The Best of Everything	
November 1959	Hound-Dog Man	
November 17, 1959	Beloved Infidel	
December 16, 1959	Journey to the Center of the Earth	
December 30, 1959	Blood and Steel	
December 1959	The Story on Page One	

== 1960s ==
=== 1960 ===
Release date	Title	Notes
February 11, 1960	Sink the Bismarck!	Shot in the UK
February 28, 1960	Bobbikins	
March 5, 1960	The 3rd Voice	
March 9, 1960	Can-Can	Nominated for the Golden Globe Award for Best Motion Picture – Musical.
March 9, 1960	The Wind Cannot Read	
March 12, 1960	Seven Thieves	
March 16, 1960	The Rookie	
March 17, 1960	A Dog of Flanders	
March 29, 1960	When Comedy Was King	
April 1, 1960	13 Fighting Men	
April 2, 1960	Twelve Hours to Kill	
April 8, 1960	Wake Me When It's Over	
May 8, 1960	Valley of the Redwoods	
May 19, 1960	Crack in the Mirror	
May 25, 1960	Wild River	Inducted into the National Film Registry in 2002.
June 17, 1960	The Story of Ruth	
June 28, 1960	Murder, Inc.	
July 1, 1960	One Foot in Hell	
July 13, 1960	The Lost World	
July 15, 1960	From the Terrace	
July 21, 1960	The Idiot	
August 2, 1960	Sons and Lovers	Nominee of the Academy Award for Best Picture. Winner of the Golden Globe Award for Best Motion Picture – Drama. Shot in the UK.
August 2, 1960	Young Jesse James	
August 28, 1960	For the Love of Mike	
September 1960	The High Powered Rifle	
September 1960	Squad Car	
September 1, 1960	Walk Tall	
September 8, 1960	Let's Make Love	Nominated for the Golden Globe Award for Best Motion Picture – Musical.
September 9, 1960	September Storm	
September 16, 1960	High Time	
October 11, 1960	Desire in the Dust	
November 10, 1960	North to Alaska	
December 1, 1960	The Wizard of Baghdad	co-production with Clover Productions
December 8, 1960	Tess of the Storm Country	
December 11, 1960	The Secret of the Purple Reef	
December 14, 1960	Esther and the King	
December 16, 1960	Flaming Star	

=== 1961 ===
Release date	Title	Notes
January 2, 1961	Swingin' Along	
January 6, 1961	The Marriage-Go-Round	
February 1961	The Long Rope	
February 1961	Sniper's Ridge	
February 9, 1961	The Millionairess	
February 17, 1961	A Circle of Deception	
February 21, 1961	Sanctuary	
March 11, 1961	The Canadians	
March 21, 1961	Days of Thrills and Laughter	
March 22, 1961	Desert Attack	
March 30, 1961	All Hands on Deck	
April 19, 1961	The Trapp Family	
April 26, 1961	Ferry to Hong Kong	
April 30, 1961	The Fiercest Heart	
May 3, 1961	The Silent Call	
May 5, 1961	Return to Peyton Place	
May 10, 1961	The Big Show	
May 17, 1961	The Right Approach	
May 26, 1961	Snow White and the Three Stooges	
June 1961	The Little Shepherd of Kingdom Come	
June 1, 1961	Battle at Bloody Beach	
June 4, 1961	Misty	
June 14, 1961	20,000 Eyes	
June 15, 1961	Wild in the Country	
July 12, 1961	Voyage to the Bottom of the Sea	
July 12, 1961	Francis of Assisi	
August 15, 1961	Marines, Let's Go	
September 1, 1961	The Big Gamble	
September 25, 1961	The Hustler	Nominated for the Academy Award for Best Picture.
October 1961	Seven Women from Hell	
October 1961	Pirates of Tortuga	
November 1961	The Purple Hills	
November 1, 1961	The Two Little Bears	
November 1, 1961	The Comancheros	
December 22, 1961	The Second Time Around	co-production with Cummings-Harman Productions
December 25, 1961	The Innocents	Shot in the UK

=== 1962 ===
Release date	Title	Notes
January 7, 1962	Madison Avenue	
January 12, 1962	Bachelor Flat	
January 19, 1962	Tender Is the Night	
February 22, 1962	Satan Never Sleeps	
March 1, 1962	Hand of Death	
March 9, 1962	State Fair	
April 1, 1962	The Broken Land	
May 18, 1962	Mr. Topaze/I Like Money	
May 24, 1962	Lisa	Nominated for the Golden Globe Award for Best Motion Picture – Drama.
May 25, 1962	The Cabinet of Caligari	
June 1, 1962	Something's Got to Give	
June 3, 1962	Womanhunt	
June 15, 1962	Mr. Hobbs Takes a Vacation	
June 1962	It Happened in Athens	
July 17, 1962	Air Patrol	
July 25, 1962	Hemingway's Adventures of a Young Man	Nominated for the Golden Globe Award for Best Motion Picture – Drama.
August 7, 1962	The Firebrand	
August 22, 1962	Five Weeks in a Balloon	
August 29, 1962	The 300 Spartans	
October 4, 1962	The Longest Day	Nominated for the Academy Award for Best Picture. Nominated for the Golden Globe Award for Best Motion Picture – Drama.
November 1962	Gigot	co-production with Seven Arts Productions
November 1962	Young Guns of Texas	
December 21, 1962	The Lion	

=== 1963 ===
Release date	Title	Notes
January 18, 1963	The Queen's Guards	
January 23, 1963	The Last Days of Sodom and Gomorrah	
February 10, 1963	Thirty Years of Fun	
February 14, 1963	The Day Mars Invaded Earth	
March 26, 1963	House of the Damned	
April 3, 1963	Nine Hours to Rama	
April 18, 1963	Marilyn	
May 20, 1963	Police Nurse	
May 15, 1963	The Yellow Canary	
June 12, 1963	Cleopatra	Nominated for the Academy Award for Best Picture. Nominated for the Golden Globe Award for Best Motion Picture – Drama.
June 19, 1963	The Stripper	
July 1, 1963	Harbor Lights	
July 15, 1963	The Leopard	
August 3, 1963	Lassie's Great Adventure	
September 2, 1963	The Young Swingers	
September 11, 1963	Of Love and Desire	
October 23, 1963	Thunder Island	
October 30, 1963	The Condemned of Altona	
November 13, 1963	Take Her, She's Mine	
December 25, 1963	Move Over, Darling	

=== 1964 ===
Release date	Title	Notes
January 30, 1964	Surf Party	
February 5, 1964	The Winston Affair	
March 18, 1964	The Last Man on Earth	International distribution only; co-production with Associated Producers and Produzioni La Regina
April 28, 1964	The Third Secret	co-production with Hubris Productions
April 29, 1964	The Curse of the Living Corpse	co-production with Deal Productions and Iselin-Tenney Productions
May 13, 1964	What a Way to Go!	co-production with Apjac-Productions
June 1, 1964	The Horror of Party Beach	co-production with Iselin-Tenney Productions
July 22, 1964	Shock Treatment	co-production with Arcola Pictures
August 19, 1964	The Horror of It All	co-production with Lippert Pictures
September 1964	Witchcraft	co-production with Lippert Pictures
September 23, 1964	Night Train to Paris	co-production with Jack Parsons Productions and Lippert Pictures
October 4, 1964	The Visit	U.S. distribution only; co-production with Les Films du Siècle and Productions et Éditions Cinématographique Français
October 14, 1964	The Earth Dies Screaming	co-production with Lippert Pictures
October 28, 1964	Rio Conchos	
November 6, 1964	Moro Witch Doctor	
November 8, 1964	Fate Is the Hunter	
November 16, 1964	Guns at Batasi	
November 18, 1964	Goodbye Charlie	
November 26, 1964	Apache Rifles	
November 1964	Back Door to Hell	
December 12, 1964	Raiders from Beneath the Sea	
December 17, 1964	Zorba the Greek	Nominated for the Academy Award for Best Picture. Nominated for the Golden Globe Award for Best Motion Picture – Drama.
December 25, 1964	The Pleasure Seekers	

=== 1965 ===
Release date	Title	Notes
January 8, 1965	Dear Brigitte	
January 20, 1965	Hush...Hush, Sweet Charlotte	co-production with the Associates & Aldrich Company
March 1, 1965	War Party	
March 2, 1965	The Sound of Music	Winner of the Academy Award for Best Picture. Winner of the Golden Globe Award for Best Motion Picture – Musical or Comedy. Inducted into the National Film Registry in 2001.
March 24, 1965	John Goldfarb, Please Come Home	
May 1965	Curse of the Fly	co-production with Lippert Pictures
May 1, 1965	Fort Courageous	
June 9, 1965	Up from the Beach	
June 16, 1965	Those Magnificent Men in their Flying Machines	Nominated for the Golden Globe Award for Best Motion Picture – Musical or Comedy.
June 16, 1965	A High Wind in Jamaica	
June 17, 1965	Convict Stage	
June 23, 1965	Von Ryan's Express	
August 23, 1965	Rapture	
August 25, 1965	Wild on the Beach	
August 25, 1965	Morituri	
September 15, 1965	The Reward	
October 1, 1965	Spaceflight IC-1	co-production with Lippert Pictures
October 7, 1965	The Agony and the Ecstasy	
October 27, 1965	The Nanny	
December 1, 1965	The Return of Mr. Moto	co-production with Lippert Pictures
December 15, 1965	The Flight of the Phoenix	Nominated for the Golden Globe Award for Best Motion Picture – Drama.
December 22, 1965	Do Not Disturb	
December 24, 1965	The Cavern	
December 1965	The Murder Game	

=== 1966 ===
Release date	Title	Notes
1966	Daniel Boone: Frontier Trail Rider	
January 12, 1966	The Plague of the Zombies	
January 12, 1966	Dracula: Prince of Darkness	
January 16, 1966	Our Man Flint	
April 6, 1966	The Reptile	
April 6, 1966	Rasputin, the Mad Monk	
April 18, 1966	Cloportes	
May 18, 1966	Weekend at Dunkirk	
June 15, 1966	Stagecoach	
June 21, 1966	The Blue Max	
July 13, 1966	How to Steal a Million	
July 20, 1966	Batman: The Movie	produced by DC Comics and Greenlawn Productions
August 3, 1966	Smoky	
August 10, 1966	Modesty Blaise	
August 24, 1966	Fantastic Voyage	
September 7, 1966	Blues for Lovers	
September 28, 1966	The Bible: In the Beginning	
October 1, 1966	That Tennessee Beat	
October 26, 1966	Way...Way Out	
December 1, 1966	I Deal in Danger	
December 20, 1966	The Sand Pebbles	Nominated for the Academy Award for Best Picture. Nominated for the Golden Globe Award for Best Motion Picture – Drama.

=== 1967 ===
Release date	Title	Notes
1967	The Jackals	
January 18, 1967	Come Spy with Me	
January 25, 1967	Prehistoric Women	U.S. distribution only; produced by Hammer Film Productions and Seven Arts
February 8, 1967	The Devil's Own	distribution only; produced by Hammer Film Productions
February 21, 1967	One Million Years BC	distribution only; produced by Hammer Film Productions and Seven Arts
March 15, 1967	The Mummy's Shroud	U.S. distribution only; produced by Hammer Film Productions
March 15, 1967	In Like Flint	
March 15, 1967	Frankenstein Created Woman	U.S. distribution only; produced by Hammer Film Productions
March 21, 1967	Hombre	
April 27, 1967	Two for the Road	
May 23, 1967	El Greco	
May 25, 1967	A Guide for the Married Man	
June 7, 1967	Caprice	
June 30, 1967	The St. Valentine's Day Massacre	
August 16, 1967	The Viking Queen	
August 22, 1967	The Flim-Flam Man	
September 19, 1967	The Cape Town Affair	
October 2, 1967	The Day the Fish Came Out	
October 2, 1967	The Incident	
November 10, 1967	Tony Rome	
December 10, 1967	Bedazzled	
December 13, 1967	Fathom	
December 15, 1967	Valley of the Dolls	
December 19, 1967	Doctor Dolittle	Nominated for the Academy Award for Best Picture. Nominated for the Golden Globe Award for Best Motion Picture – Musical or Comedy.

=== 1968 ===
Release date	Title	Notes
January 16, 1968	The Legend of Custer	
February 7, 1968	The Anniversary	
February 8, 1968	Planet of the Apes	Inducted into the National Film Registry in 2001.
February 16, 1968	Five Million Years to Earth	U.S. distribution only; produced by Hammer Film Productions and Seven Arts
March 31, 1968	The Further Perils of Laurel and Hardy	
May 23, 1968	Prudence and the Pill	
May 28, 1968	The Detective	
June 1, 1968	Bandolero!	
June 12, 1968	The Sweet Ride	
June 19, 1968	The Lost Continent	U.S. distribution only; produced by Hammer Film Productions and Seven Arts
June 25, 1968	The Secret Life of an American Wife	
August 5, 1968	A Challenge for Robin Hood	distribution only; produced by Hammer Film Productions and Seven Arts Productions; Distributed by Warner-Pathé Distributors
September 11, 1968	Deadfall	
October 16, 1968	The Boston Strangler	
October 22, 1968	Star!	
October 23, 1968	Pretty Poison	
November 20, 1968	The Touchables	
November 20, 1968	Lady in Cement	
November 24, 1968	Joanna	
November 27, 1968	A Flea in Her Ear	
December 10, 1968	The Magus	
December 18, 1968	The Devil's Bride	

=== 1969 ===
Release date	Title	Notes
January 26, 1969	Decline and Fall... of a Birdwatcher	
February 10, 1969	The Guru	
March 2, 1969	The Prime of Miss Jean Brodie	Nominated for the Golden Globe Award for Best Motion Picture – Drama.
March 26, 1969	100 Rifles	
April 7, 1969	Doctor Glas	
April 30, 1969	Hard Contract	
May 14, 1969	The Last Shot You Hear	
June 23, 1969	The Boys of Paul Street	
June 25, 1969	The Chairman	
June 27, 1969	Che!	
July 9, 1969	Secret World	
August 6, 1969	Justine	
August 20, 1969	Staircase	
September 23, 1969	Butch Cassidy and the Sundance Kid	Nominated for the Academy Award for Best Picture. Nominated for the Golden Globe Award for Best Motion Picture – Drama. Inducted into the National Film Registry in 2003.
October 5, 1969	A Walk with Love and Death	
October 12, 1969	The Archangel	
November 5, 1969	The Girl Who Couldn't Say No	
November 27, 1969	The Undefeated	
December 14, 1969	John and Mary	
December 16, 1969	Hello, Dolly!	Nominated for the Academy Award for Best Picture. Nominated for the Golden Globe Award for Best Motion Picture – Musical or Comedy.

== 1970s ==
=== 1970 ===
Release date	Title	Notes
January 21, 1970	The Only Game in Town	—
February 1, 1970	The Kremlin Letter	—
March 18, 1970 (Note: Premiered in New York City on January 25, 1970.)	M*A*S*H	Nominated for the Academy Award for Best Picture. Winner of the Golden Globe Award for Best Motion Picture – Musical or Comedy. Inducted into the National Film Registry in 1996. co-production with Aspen Productions
March 29, 1970 (Note: Released in French theaters on December 1, 1969.)	The Sicilian Clan	French-Italian film
April 2, 1970 (Note: Premiered in New York City on February 5, 1970.)	Patton	Winner of the Academy Award for Best Picture. Nominated for the Golden Globe Award for Best Motion Picture – Drama. Inducted into the National Film Registry in 2003
May 26, 1970 (Note: Released in Italian theaters on April 23, 1970.)	Beneath the Planet of the Apes	co-production with APJAC Productions
June 17, 1970	Beyond the Valley of the Dolls	—
June 24, 1970 (Note: Premiered in Los Angeles on June 22, 1970.)	Myra Breckinridge	—
July 12, 1970	Hello-Goodbye	British film
July 31, 1970	Move	—
August 7, 1970 (Note: Released in UK theaters on July 9, 1970.)	The Games	British film
September 23, 1970	Tora! Tora! Tora!	—
September 1970	4 Clowns	distribution only
October 1, 1970	Cover Me Babe	—
October 16, 1970 (Note: Premiered in New York City on October 11, 1970.)	The Great White Hope	—
December 6, 1970	Gimme Shelter	international theatrical distribution only; produced by Maysles Films; distributed in the U.S. by Cinema 5

=== 1971 ===
Release date	Title	Notes
February 9, 1971	Little Murders	—
March 13, 1971	Vanishing Point	co-production with Cupid Productions
March 17, 1971	B.S. I Love You	distribution only; produced by Motion Pictures International
March 21, 1971	Making It	—
April 9, 1971	Celebration at Big Sur	theatrical distribution only; produced by Mann Theatres
May 26, 1971	Escape from the Planet of the Apes	co-production with APJAC Productions
July 1, 1971	Walkabout (Note: Owned by Janus Films and The Criterion Collection)	theatrical distribution only
June 11, 1971 (Note: Premiered in New York City on April 9, 1971.)	The Mephisto Waltz	co-production with QM Productions
July 13, 1971 (Note: Released in French theaters on June 1, 1971.)	The Panic in Needle Park	—
July 23, 1971	The Seven Minutes	—
August 19, 1971	The Marriage of a Young Stockbroker	—
October 9, 1971 (Note: Premiered in Los Angeles and New York City on October 7, 1971.)	The French Connection	Winner of the Academy Award for Best Picture. Nominated for the Golden Globe Award for Best Motion Picture – Drama. Inducted into the National Film Registry in 2005
October 1971 (Note: Released in UK theaters on October 16, 1970.)	All the Right Noises	British film; distribution only; produced by Trigon Productions
December 10, 1971	Welcome Home Soldier Boys	—
December 12, 1971	Made for Each Other	co-production with Wylde Films
December 22, 1971	Straw Dogs	select international theatrical distribution only; produced by ABC Pictures

=== 1972 ===
Release date	Title	Notes
January 12, 1972	Blindman	theatrical distribution outside Italy only; produced by ABKCO Films
January 26, 1972	The Hot Rock	—
February 13, 1972	Cabaret	select international theatrical distribution only; produced by ABC Pictures
February 19, 1972	Without Apparent Motive	North American theatrical distribution only
March 23, 1972	The Concert for Bangladesh	theatrical distribution only; produced by Apple Films
April 16, 1972	The Culpepper Cattle Co.	—
May 26, 1972 (Note: Premiered in New York on May 23, 1972.)	The Other	—
June 14, 1972	Fillmore (Note: Owned by Rhino Entertainment)	theatrical distribution only
June 16, 1972	The Strange Vengeance of Rosalie (Note: Owned by Bristol Myers Squibb)	theatrical distribution only; produced by Palomar Pictures International
June 23, 1972 (Note: Premiered in New York on June 16, 1972.)	What Became of Jack and Jill?	British film; theatrical distribution only; produced by Palomar Pictures International and Amicus Productions
June 30, 1972 (Note: Premiered in Los Angeles on June 14, 1972.)	Conquest of the Planet of the Apes	co-production with APJAC Productions
August 23, 1972	To Kill a Clown	theatrical distribution only; produced by Palomar Pictures International
August 30, 1972 (Note: Premiered in Los Angeles on May 15, 1972.)	The Salzburg Connection	—
September 24, 1972	Sounder (Note: Owned by the Rainbow Group Ltd, with U.S. distribution rights presumably owned by Lionsgate as of 2024)	Nominated for the Academy Award for Best Picture. Inducted into the National Film Registry in 2021. theatrical distribution only; produced by Radnitz/Mattel Productions
September 27, 1972	The Darwin Adventure	British film; theatrical distribution only; produced by Palomar Pictures International
October 11, 1972	Vampire Circus (Note: Co-owned by ITV Studios and Hammer Film Productions, with North American theatrical and television distribution rights currently licensed to MGM (via Orion Pictures)) (Note: Released in West German theaters on June 23, 1972.)	theatrical distribution outside the U.K. and Ireland only; produced by the Rank Organisation and Hammer Film Productions
October 11, 1972	Countess Dracula	North American theatrical distribution only; produced by the Rank Organisation and Hammer Film Productions
October 19, 1972	When the Legends Die	—
October 22, 1972 (Note: Released in French theaters on September 15, 1972.)	The Discreet Charm of the Bourgeoisie (Note: Owned by StudioCanal, with U.S. distribution shared by Rialto Pictures and Lionsgate)	theatrical distribution outside Spain only; produced by Greenwich Film Productions
November 1, 1972	Trouble Man	—
November 29, 1972	And Hope to Die (Note: Owned by StudioCanal)	theatrical distribution outside France and Spain only; produced by Greenwich Film Productions
December 11, 1972	Sleuth	Nominated for the Golden Globe Award for Best Motion Picture – Drama. distribution only; produced by Palomar Pictures International
December 13, 1972 (Note: Premiered in New York City on December 12, 1972.)	The Poseidon Adventure	Nominated for the Golden Globe Award for Best Motion Picture – Drama. co-production with Kent Productions
December 20, 1972	The Effect of Gamma Rays on the Man-in-the-Moon Marigolds	—
December 22, 1972 (Note: Premiered in New York City on December 17, 1972.)	The Heartbreak Kid	distribution only; produced by Palomar Pictures International

=== 1973 ===
Release date	Title	Notes
March 31, 1973	Gospel Road: A Story of Jesus	distribution only; produced by the Luther Corporation
April 1, 1973	Ace Eli and Rodger of the Skies	—
May 1973	Kid Blue	—
May 24, 1973	Emperor of the North Pole	co-production with Inter-Hemisphere Productions
June 15, 1973	The Legend of Hell House	British film; distribution only; produced by Academy Pictures Corporation
June 15, 1973	Battle for the Planet of the Apes	co-production with APJAC International
July 27, 1973	The Last American Hero	—
August 3, 1973	The Neptune Factor	co-production with Quadrant Films and Bellevue Pathe
August 9, 1973	Gordon's War	co-production with Palomar Pictures International
October 16, 1973	The Paper Chase	—
November 21, 1973	Hex	—
December 5, 1973	Even Angels Eat Beans	North American and select international theatrical distribution only
December 14, 1973	The Seven-Ups	—
December 18, 1973	Cinderella Liberty	Nominated for the Golden Globe Award for Best Motion Picture – Drama.
December 20, 1973	The Laughing Policeman	—

=== 1974 ===
Release date	Title	Notes
February 6, 1974	Zardoz	—
March 27, 1974	Conrack	—
March 29, 1974	The Three Musketeers	Nominated for the Golden Globe Award for Best Motion Picture – Musical or Comedy. North American and select international theatrical distribution only; produced by Film Trust S.A.
April 22, 1974	Claudine	distribution only; produced by Third World Cinema Corporation
May 17, 1974	Dirty Mary Crazy Larry	distribution only; produced by Academy Pictures Corporation
June 28, 1974	S*P*Y*S	North American distribution only; co-production with Chartoff-Winkler Productions and Anglo-EMI (uncredited)
July 17, 1974	The Mad Adventures of Rabbi Jacob	theatrical distribution outside France only
August 7, 1974	Together Brothers	distribution only; produced by Sandy Howard Productions
August 12, 1974	Harry and Tonto	Nominated for the Golden Globe Award for Best Motion Picture – Musical or Comedy
August 29, 1974	99 and 44/100% Dead	—
September 26, 1974 (Note: Released in UK theaters on August 15, 1974.)	11 Harrowhouse	British film
September 29, 1974	Lacombe, Lucien	theatrical distribution outside France and West Germany only
October 16, 1974	The House on Skull Mountain	—
October 18, 1974	The Crazy World of Julius Vrooder	distribution only; produced by Playboy Enterprises
October 27, 1974	The Phantom of Liberty	theatrical distribution outside the U.K., Ireland, Italy and Japan only; produced by Greenwich Film Productions
October 31, 1974	Phantom of the Paradise	distribution only; produced by Harbor Productions
October 1974	The Green Hornet	U.S. theatrical distribution only; feature film compilation of the TV series
December 15, 1974	Young Frankenstein	Inducted into the National Film Registry in 2003. distribution only, produced by Gruskoff/Venture Films, Crossbow Productions and Jouer Limited
December 16, 1974	The Towering Inferno	Nominated for the Academy Award for Best Picture. North American distribution excluding television only; co-production with Warner Bros. and Irwin Allen Productions

=== 1975 ===
Release date	Title	Notes
January 15, 1975	The Nickel Ride	distribution only; produced by Boardwalk Productions
February 26, 1975	The Four Musketeers	British film; North American and select international theatrical distribution only; produced by Film Trust S.A.
March 1, 1975	At Long Last Love	—
March 27, 1975	Deadly Strangers	British film; international distribution only
April 16, 1975	Capone	distribution only; produced by Santa Fe Productions and Palo Alto Productions
April 16, 1975	The Terrorists	North American, Australian, New Zealand and Japanese distribution only; produced by British Lion Films
May 21, 1975	French Connection II	—
May 21, 1975	W.W. and the Dixie Dancekings	—
June 27, 1975	Race with the Devil	—
August 1975	The Man from Hong Kong (Note: Owned by Fortune Star)	North American and Indian theatrical distribution only; produced by Golden Harvest
September 26, 1975	The Rocky Horror Picture Show	Inducted into the National Film Registry in 2005. distribution only
October 10, 1975 (Note: Released in UK theaters on August 15, 1975.)	Royal Flash	British film; distribution only; produced by Two Roads Productions
October 15, 1975	Whiffs	North American theatrical distribution only; produced by Brut Productions
October 17, 1975	Down the Ancient Staircase	Italian-French film; theatrical distribution only
October 26, 1975	Black Moon (Note: Owned by Nouvelles Éditions de Films, with U.S. distribution rights currently licensed to Janus Films and The Criterion Collection)	North American, Australian, New Zealand and Italian theatrical distribution only
October 26, 1975	The Devil Is a Woman	North American theatrical distribution only
October 29, 1975	Take a Hard Ride	—
November 14, 1975	Three Days of the Condor	select international theatrical distribution only; produced by Dino De Laurentiis Corporation
December 3, 1975	Peeper	—
December 14, 1975	The Adventure of Sherlock Holmes' Smarter Brother	—
December 25, 1975	Lucky Lady	co-production with Gruskoff/Venture Films and Stanley Donen Enterprises

=== 1976 ===
Release date	Title	Notes
January 23, 1976	Hugo the Hippo	North American theatrical distribution only; produced by Brut Productions
January 25, 1976	Scent of a Woman	North American theatrical distribution only
February 4, 1976	Next Stop, Greenwich Village	—
February 18, 1976	I Will, I Will... for Now	North American theatrical distribution only; produced by Brut Productions
March 26, 1976	Sky Riders	co-production with Sandy Howard Productions
April 1, 1976	The Duchess and the Dirtwater Fox	—
April 5, 1976	The Blue Bird	distribution outside the Soviet Union and Japan only; produced by Lenfilm
May 12, 1976	End of the Game	North and South American distribution only
May 26, 1976	Mother, Jugs & Speed	—
June 1, 1976 (Note: Premiered in New York City on April 23, 1976.)	The Last Hard Men	—
June 2, 1976	Breaking Point	distribution outside Canada only; co-production with Astral Bellevue Pathe
June 16, 1976	Silent Movie	Nominated for the Golden Globe Award for Best Motion Picture – Musical or Comedy. co-production with Crossbow Productions
June 25, 1976	The Omen	co-production with Mace Neufeld Productions
July 1976	Moving Violation	co-production with Santa Fe Productions
September 3, 1976	1900	select international distribution including the U.K., Ireland, Italy and Spain only; produced by Produzioni Europee Associati
September 26, 1976 (Note: Released in Italian theaters on December 16, 1975.)	The Sunday Woman	French-Italian film; theatrical distribution only
October 3, 1976	Alex & the Gypsy	—
October 8, 1976	Fighting Mad	co-production with Santa Fe Productions
November 1976	Kenny & Company	North American distribution only; produced by New Breed Productions
November 12, 1976	All This and World War II	co-production with Visual Programme Systems
December 3, 1976	Silver Streak	co-production with Frank Yablans Presentations and Miller-Milkis Productions

=== 1977 ===
Release date	Title	Notes
January 20, 1977	The Forbidden Room	international theatrical distribution only
January 21, 1977	Salon Kitty	international theatrical distribution outside Italy, West Germany and Japan only
February 9, 1977	Wizards	distribution only; produced by Bakshi Productions
March 3, 1977	Mr. Billion	co-production with Pantheon Pictures
April 1, 1977	Raggedy Ann & Andy: A Musical Adventure (Note: Owned by Kohlberg Kravis Roberts through Simon & Schuster; currently unavailable for distribution)	distribution only; produced by the Bobbs-Merrill Company
April 3, 1977	3 Women	co-production with Lion's Gate Films
May 25, 1977	Star Wars (Note: Initially, the film was not part of Disney's purchase of Lucasfilm, as Fox retained the perpetual distribution rights. However, on 2017, Disney announced its intent to acquire 20th Century Fox and completed in 2019, effectively returning full circles back to Disney.)	Nominated for Academy Award for Best Picture. Nominated for Golden Globe Award for Best Motion Picture – Drama. Nominated for BAFTA Award for Best Film. Inducted into the National Film Registry in 1989. Retitled Star Wars: Episode IV – A New Hope in 1981. Distribution only, produced by Lucasfilm Ltd.
June 8, 1977	The Other Side of Midnight	co-production with Frank Yablans Presentations
June 9, 1977	Fire Sale	—
August 12, 1977	Suspiria	North American theatrical and television, Australian and New Zealand theatrical distribution under International Classics only
August 24, 1977	Thunder and Lightning	—
October 2, 1977	Julia	Nominated for the Academy Award for Best Picture. Nominated for the Golden Globe Award for Best Motion Picture – Drama.
October 21, 1977	Damnation Alley	—
November 14, 1977	The Turning Point	Nominee of the Academy Award for Best Picture. Winner of the Golden Globe Award for Best Motion Picture – Drama. co-production with Hera Productions
December 18, 1977	The World's Greatest Lover	—
December 25, 1977	High Anxiety	Nominated for the Golden Globe Award for Best Motion Picture – Musical or Comedy. co-production with Crossbow Productions

=== 1978 ===
Release date	Title	Notes
March 5, 1978	An Unmarried Woman	Nominated for the Academy Award for Best Picture. Nominated for the Golden Globe Award for Best Motion Picture – Drama.
March 10, 1978	The Fury	co-production with Frank Yablans Presentations
June 9, 1978	Damien – Omen II	co-production with Mace Neufeld Productions
June 28, 1978	The Driver	North American distribution only; produced by EMI Films
August 29, 1978	A Wedding	co-production with Lion's Gate Films
October 6, 1978	The Boys from Brazil (Note: Owned by ITV Studios)	North American theatrical distribution only; produced by ITC Entertainment
November 8, 1978	Magic (Note: Owned by Dark Sky Films)	theatrical distribution only

=== 1979 ===
Release date	Title	Notes
February 9, 1979	Quintet	co-production with Lion's Gate Films
March 2, 1979	Norma Rae	Nominated for the Academy Award for Best Picture. Nominated for the Golden Globe Award for Best Motion Picture – Drama.
April 6, 1979	A Perfect Couple	co-production with Lion's Gate Films
April 27, 1979	Dreamer	—
May 25, 1979	Alien	Inducted into the National Film Registry in 2002. co-production with Brandywine Productions
June 15, 1979	Butch and Sundance: The Early Days	—
July 13, 1979	Breaking Away	Nominated for the Academy Award for Best Picture. Winner of the Golden Globe Award for Best Motion Picture – Musical or Comedy.
September 30, 1979	La Luna	Nominated for the Golden Globe Award for Best Actress in a Motion Picture – Drama.
October 5, 1979 (Note: Released in Italian theaters on February 15, 1979.)	Nosferatu the Vampyre (Note: Owned by Werner Herzog Filmproduktion, with U.S. distribution rights currently licensed to Shout! Studios)	distribution outside France and Japan only
October 19, 1979 (Note: Released in UK theaters on July 5, 1979.)	Avalanche Express	North American and select international distribution including the U.K., Ireland, West Germany and France only; produced by Lorimar Productions
November 7, 1979	The Rose	Nominated for the Golden Globe Award for Best Motion Picture – Musical or Comedy
November 16, 1979	The Runner Stumbles (Note: Owned by Video Mercury Films)	U.S. distribution only; produced by Melvin Simon Productions
December 20, 1979	All That Jazz	Nominated for the Academy Award for Best Picture. Inducted into the National Film Registry in 2001. North American theatrical and worldwide home media distribution only; produced by Columbia Pictures
December 21, 1979	Scavenger Hunt	North American distribution only; produced by Melvin Simon Productions

== 1980s ==
=== 1980 ===
Release date	Title	Notes
February 1, 1980	Fatso	co-production with Brooksfilms
February 8, 1980 (Note: Released in Italian theaters on February 7, 1980.)	Inferno (Note: U.S. home media and digital distribution rights currently owned by Blue Underground)	Italian film; distribution only
May 1, 1980	Headin' for Broadway	—
May 21, 1980	The Empire Strikes Back (Note: Initially co-owned by Disney (by virtue of acquiring Lucasfilm in 2012) and Fox, with the latter retaining distribution rights to the five Star Wars films, as were originally set to expire on May 1, 2020. Disney would gain full control of the rights to this film through the acquisition of 20th Century Fox on March 20, 2019.)	Inducted into the National Film Registry in 2010. distribution only; produced by Lucasfilm Ltd.
June 20, 1980	Brubaker	—
June 27, 1980	The Stunt Man (Note: Owned by Shout! Studios)	Nominated for the Golden Globe Award for Best Motion Picture – Drama. North American and select international distribution only; produced by Melvin Simon Productions
July 11, 1980	Oh Heavenly Dog	co-production with Mulberry Square Productions
July 25, 1980	Middle Age Crazy	Canadian film; North American distribution only; produced by Canadian Film Development Corporation, Guardian Trust Company, Krofft Entertainment and Tormont Films
August 15, 1980	Willie & Phil	—
August 15, 1980	My Bodyguard (Note: Co-owned by Video Mercury Films)	North American and select international distribution only; produced by Melvin Simon Productions
September 12, 1980	Health	co-production with Lion's Gate Films
October 3, 1980	The Man with Bogart's Face	North American and select international distribution only; produced by Melvin Simon Productions
October 3, 1980	Terror Train (Note: Owned by TVA Films)	distribution in the U.S., Latin America, the U.K., Ireland, Australia, New Zealand and Japan only; produced by Astral Bellevue Pathé and Sandy Howard Productions
October 6, 1980	Kagemusha	Nominated for the Academy Award for Best Foreign Language Film. distribution outside Japan only; produced by Toho
October 24, 1980	Loving Couples (Note: Owned by Warner Bros. (via HBO))	North American theatrical distribution only; produced by Time-Life Films
December 1, 1980	A Change of Seasons	North American distribution only; produced by Film Finance Group
December 19, 1980	Tribute	Canadian film; theatrical distribution only; produced by the Turman-Foster Company
December 19, 1980	9 to 5	co-production with IPC Films

=== 1981 ===
Release date	Title	Notes
February 6, 1981	Fort Apache, The Bronx	North American theatrical distribution only; produced by Time-Life Films
February 13, 1981	Eyewitness	—
March 6, 1981	On the Right Track	North and Latin American distribution only; produced by Zephyr Productions
March 20, 1981	The Final Conflict	co-production with Mace Neufeld Productions
April 3, 1981	Hardly Working	North American, Australian, New Zealand and Japanese distribution only
May 1, 1981	Savage Harvest	North American distribution only
May 21, 1981	Death Hunt	distribution outside Hong Kong only; produced by Golden Harvest
June 12, 1981	History of the World, Part I (Note: Fox has since reclaimed international distribution rights to this film)	North American and Japanese distribution only; co-production with Brooksfilms
June 19, 1981	The Cannonball Run	distribution in North America theatrically, the U.K., Ireland, Australia, New Zealand, Italy and India only; produced by Golden Harvest
July 17, 1981	Zorro, The Gay Blade	North American and select international distribution only; produced by Melvin Simon Productions
August 28, 1981	Chu Chu and the Philly Flash	North American and select international distribution only; produced by Melvin Simon Productions
September 1981	The Woman Inside	—
September 25, 1981	Southern Comfort (Note: Owned by FilmRise)	U.S. theatrical distribution only; produced by Cinema Group Ventures
October 9, 1981	Tattoo	North American distribution only
October 25, 1981	Quartet	U.K. theatrical distribution only
October 31, 1981	Shock Treatment	—
December 11, 1981	Four Friends (Note: Owned by MGM)	international theatrical distribution outside Australia and New Zealand only; produced by Filmways Pictures
December 18, 1981	Taps	—
December 25, 1981	Modern Problems	—

=== 1982 ===
Release date	Title	Notes
January 29, 1982	Venom	German theatrical distribution only; produced by Morison Film Group and Venom Productions
February 12, 1982	The Amateur	distribution outside Canada only; produced by Anabasis Investments
February 12, 1982	Quest for Fire	North and Latin American, U.K., Irish and Spanish distribution only; produced by International Cinema Corporation and Famous Players
March 5, 1982	Making Love	co-production with the IndieProd Company
March 19, 1982	Porky's (Note: Co-owned by TVA Films)	distribution outside Australia and New Zealand theatrically and Canadian non-theatrical rights only; produced by Melvin Simon Productions and Astral Bellevue Pathé
March 26, 1982	I Ought to Be in Pictures	—
April 9, 1982 (Note: Released in international theaters on May 15, 1981.)	Chariots of Fire	international distribution only; co-production with Allied Stars Ltd and Enigma Productions; distributed in North America by the Ladd Company and Warner Bros.
April 30, 1982	The Chosen	North American co-distribution with Analysis Film Releasing Corporation only
May 14, 1982 (Note: Released in international theaters on March 16, 1982.)	Conan the Barbarian (Note: Fox has since reclaimed home media rights from Weintraub Entertainment Group (the successor-in-interest to the film's international home video contractor Thorn EMI) in 1990)	international theatrical and television distribution outside West Germany and Austria only; produced by Dino De Laurentiis Corporation; distributed in North America by Universal Pictures
May 28, 1982	Visiting Hours	Canadian film; distribution only; produced by Filmplan International and Canadian Film Development Corporation
June 18, 1982	Author! Author!	—
June 25, 1982	Megaforce	North American, U.K. and Irish distribution only; produced by Golden Harvest
July 16, 1982	Young Doctors in Love	North American theatrical distribution only; produced by ABC Motion Pictures
July 16, 1982	Six Pack	co-production with Lion Share Productions
August 6, 1982	The Pirate Movie	—
August 16, 1982	Piaf: The Early Years	U.S. distribution under 20th Century-Fox International Classics only
October 1, 1982	Eating Raoul (Note: Owned by Mercury Film, Inc., with distribution rights licensed to Janus Films and the Criterion Collection)	North America co-distribution under 20th Century-Fox International Classics with Quartet/Films Incorporated only
October 9, 1982	I, the Jury	North American distribution only; produced by American Cinema Productions
October 22, 1982	Monsignor	co-production with Frank Yablans Presentations
October 29, 1982	National Lampoon's Class Reunion	North American theatrical distribution only; produced by ABC Motion Pictures
November 5, 1982	The Man from Snowy River	distribution outside Australia and New Zealand only; produced by Edgley International and Cambridge Productions
December 8, 1982	The Verdict	Nominee of the Academy Award for Best Picture. Nominated for the Golden Globe Award for Best Motion Picture – Drama. co-production with the Zanuck/Brown Productions
December 22, 1982	Kiss Me Goodbye	—

=== 1983 ===
Release date	Title	Notes
January 21, 1983	Threshold	U.S. distribution under 20th Century-Fox International Classics only
February 4, 1983	The Entity	distribution only; produced by American Cinema Productions
February 4, 1983	Without a Trace	—
February 18, 1983	The King of Comedy (Note: Regency would retain ownership of this film, with distribution rights being licensed to various distributors, including Warner Bros. following a deal with Regency in 1991. Following Regency's new deal with Fox in 1997, the distribution rights eventually returned to Fox, the film's theatrical distributor)	theatrical distribution in North and Latin America, the U.K., Ireland, Australia, New Zealand and India only; produced by Embassy International Pictures
February 19, 1983	Betrayal	North American distribution under 20th Century-Fox International Classics only; produced by Horizon Pictures
March 25, 1983	Max Dugan Returns	—
March 25, 1983	Tough Enough	distribution only; produced by American Cinema Productions
April 1, 1983	Heart Like a Wheel	North American, U.K. and Irish distribution only; co-production with Aurora Productions
May 20, 1983	Bill Cosby: Himself	distribution under 20th Century-Fox International Classics only; produced by Jemmin, Inc.
May 25, 1983	Return of the Jedi	distribution only; produced by Lucasfilm Ltd. Inducted into the National Film Registry in 2021
June 24, 1983	Porky's II: The Next Day	distribution outside Australia and New Zealand theatrically and Canadian non-theatrical rights only; produced by Simon/Reeves/Landsburg Productions and Astral Bellevue Pathé
July 22, 1983	Mr. Mom	North American theatrical distribution only; produced by Sherwood Productions
August 5, 1983	The Star Chamber	co-production with Frank Yablans Presentations
August 19, 1983	Fire and Ice (Note: Owned by AMBI Group (via Exclusive Media), with home media distribution rights licensed to Blue Underground)	North American theatrical and television distribution only; produced by Producers Sales Organization, Aspen Productions and Film Finance Group
October 21, 1983	All the Right Moves	—
November 4, 1983	The Osterman Weekend	North American theatrical and television, U.K., Irish and Japanese theatrical distribution only; produced by Davis-Panzer Productions
November 18, 1983	A Night in Heaven	co-production with Koch/Kirkwood Productions
December 14, 1983	Silkwood	Nominated for the Golden Globe Award for Best Motion Picture – Drama; North American theatrical distribution only; produced by ABC Motion Pictures
December 16, 1983	Two of a Kind	—
December 16, 1983	To Be or Not to Be	distribution only; produced by Brooksfilms
December 19, 1983	Reuben, Reuben	North American, U.K. and Irish distribution under 20th Century-Fox International Classics only
December 23, 1983	Ziggy Stardust and the Spiders from Mars	U.S. theatrical co-distribution with Miramax Films only; produced by Mainman Productions and Pennabaker Associates

=== 1984 ===
Release date	Title	Notes
1984	The Secret Diary of Sigmund Freud	U.S. distribution only
January 1, 1984	Careful, He Might Hear You	North American distribution only
January 20, 1984	The Buddy System	—
February 10, 1984	Unfaithfully Yours	—
February 17, 1984	Blame It on Rio	North American theatrical distribution only; produced by Sherwood Productions
March 30, 1984	Antarctica	North American distribution only; produced by Fuji Telecasting, Gakken and Kurahara Productions
March 30, 1984	Romancing the Stone	distribution only; produced by El Corazon Producciones
April 4, 1984	The Stone Boy	distribution under TLC Films only
April 13, 1984	Kidco	co-production with Frank Yablans Presentations
April 13, 1984	Phar Lap	North American, U.K. and Irish distribution only; produced by Edgley International
June 22, 1984	Rhinestone	—
June 29, 1984	Bachelor Party	distribution only; produced by Aspect Ratio Productions and Twin Continental Productions
July 9, 1984	The Gods Must Be Crazy	North American, Australian and New Zealand, West German and Austrian distribution only; produced by C.A.T. Films
July 20, 1984	Revenge of the Nerds	co-production with Interscope Communications
August 10, 1984	The Adventures of Buckaroo Banzai Across the 8th Dimension!	North American theatrical distribution only; produced by Sherwood Productions
August 17, 1984	Dreamscape	North and Latin American and Spanish theatrical distribution only; produced by Zupnik-Curtis Enterprises
September 28, 1984	Impulse	North American theatrical distribution only; produced by ABC Motion Pictures; not to be confused with the unrelated 1990 film of the same name
October 23, 1984	Give My Regards to Broad Street	British film; distribution only; produced by MPL Communications
November 2, 1984	Paris, Texas (Note: Owned by the Wim Wenders Foundation; commercial rights owned by HanWay Films, with U.S. distribution rights currently licensed to Janus Films and The Criterion Collection)	North American distribution only; produced by Road Movies Filmproduktion and Argos Films
November 16, 1984	Gimme an 'F'	—
December 21, 1984	The Flamingo Kid	North American theatrical distribution only; produced by ABC Motion Pictures and Mercury Entertainment
December 21, 1984	Johnny Dangerously	—

=== 1985 ===
Release date	Title	Notes
February 8, 1985	Mischief	—
February 15, 1985	Turk 182	co-production with Interscope Communications
March 22, 1985	Porky's Revenge	distribution outside Australia and New Zealand theatrically and Canadian non-theatrical rights only; produced by Melvin Simon Productions and Astral Bellevue Pathé
March 29, 1985	Almost You	North American distribution under TLC Films (uncredited) only; produced by Wescom Productions
April 12, 1985 (Note: Released in international theaters on March 27, 1985.)	Ladyhawke	international distribution only; co-production with Warner Bros.
April 19, 1985	Moving Violations	co-production with I.P.I. Productions
May 10, 1985	Secret Places	U.S. distribution only; produced by Skreba Films and Virgin Films
June 14, 1985	Prizzi's Honor	Nominated for the Academy Award for Best Picture. Winner of the Golden Globe Award for Best Motion Picture – Drama. North American theatrical distribution only; produced by ABC Motion Pictures
June 21, 1985	Cocoon	Nominated for the Golden Globe Award for Best Motion Picture – Musical or Comedy. co-production with the Zanuck/Brown Company
July 19, 1985	The Man with One Red Shoe	—
August 14, 1985	Key Exchange	North American distribution only; produced by M-Square Entertainment
August 23, 1985	Warning Sign	co-production with Barwood/Robbins Productions
September 20, 1985	Joshua Then and Now	Canadian film; North American distribution only; produced by RSL Entertainment Corporation
September 20, 1985	Plenty (Note: Owned by StudioCanal, with U.S. distribution rights licensed to Lionsgate)	North American, West German and Austrian theatrical distribution only; produced by RKO Pictures and Edward R. Pressman Film Corporation
October 4, 1985	The Doctor and the Devils	North American, U.K. and Irish distribution only; produced by Brooksfilms
October 4, 1985	Commando	co-production with Silver Pictures
November 22, 1985	Bad Medicine	co-production with Lantana Productions
December 11, 1985	The Jewel of the Nile	co-production with the Stone Group
December 18, 1985 (Note: Released in international theaters on February 20, 1985.)	Brazil	international theatrical distribution only; produced by Embassy International Pictures; distributed in North America by Universal Pictures
December 20, 1985	Enemy Mine	co-production with Kings Road Entertainment

=== 1986 ===
Release date	Title	Notes
January 17, 1986	The Boy in Blue	Canadian film; co-production with International Cinema Corporation and Canadian Broadcasting Corporation
January 31, 1986	Stripper	North American distribution only; produced by Embassy International Pictures
January 31, 1986	Power	North American theatrical distribution only; produced by Lorimar Motion Pictures and Polar Film
February 14, 1986	The Vindicator	Canadian film; North American distribution only; produced by Michael Levy Enterprises
March 7, 1986	Death of an Angel	North American theatrical distribution only; produced by Angeles Entertainment and RDR Productions
March 7, 1986	Highlander (Note: Co-owned by StudioCanal, with U.S. home media and digital distribution rights licensed to Lionsgate)	North American theatrical and television, West German, Austrian and Swiss theatrical distribution only; produced by Thorn EMI Screen Entertainment and Davis-Panzer Productions
March 28, 1986	Lucas	co-production with Lawrence Gordon Productions
April 18, 1986 (Note: Released in international theaters on August 28, 1985.)	Legend	international theatrical distribution only; produced by Embassy International Pictures; distributed in North America by Universal Pictures
June 6, 1986	SpaceCamp	North American theatrical distribution only; produced by ABC Motion Pictures
June 13, 1986	The Manhattan Project (Note: Co-owned by MGM)	North American theatrical and television distribution only; produced by Gladden Entertainment
July 2, 1986	Big Trouble in Little China	co-production with Taft/Barish/Monash Productions
July 18, 1986	Aliens	co-production with Brandywine Productions
August 15, 1986	The Boy Who Could Fly	North American, U.K. and Irish theatrical distribution only; produced by Lorimar Motion Pictures
August 15, 1986	The Fly	distribution only; produced by Brooksfilms
September 19, 1986	The Name of the Rose (Note: Owned by Constantin Film, with U.S. distribution rights currently licensed to Samuel Goldwyn Films)	North American and Korean theatrical distribution only; produced by Neue Constantin Film
September 26, 1986	Half Moon Street (Note: Home media and digital distribution rights owned by MGM (via Orion Pictures))	North American theatrical distribution only; produced by RKO Pictures, Edward R. Pressman Film Corporation and Geoff Reeve Enterprise
September 26, 1986	Crocodile Dundee (Note: International rights owned by Rimfire Films)	international distribution outside Australia and New Zealand only; produced by Rimfire Films; distributed in North America by Paramount Pictures
October 10, 1986	Jumpin' Jack Flash	co-production with Lawrence Gordon Productions and Silver Pictures
November 14, 1986	Streets of Gold	North American theatrical distribution only
December 25, 1986	The Morning After	North American, U.K. and Irish theatrical distribution only; produced by Lorimar Motion Pictures and American Filmworks

=== 1987 ===
Release date	Title	Notes
January 2, 1987	Wisdom	North American theatrical and television distribution only; produced by Gladden Entertainment
February 6, 1987	Black Widow	co-production with Laurence Mark Productions
February 13, 1987	Mannequin	North American theatrical and television distribution only; produced by Gladden Entertainment
March 6, 1987	Raising Arizona	distribution only; produced by Circle Films
April 17, 1987	Project X	co-production with Lasker/Parkes Productions
June 12, 1987	Predator	co-production with the Gordon Company, Silver Pictures and Davis Entertainment
July 10, 1987	Revenge of the Nerds II: Nerds in Paradise	co-production with Interscope Communications
September 18, 1987	The Pick-up Artist	—
September 25, 1987	The Princess Bride	Inducted into the National Film Registry in 2016. North American theatrical and television distribution only; produced by Act III Communications
October 2, 1987	Big Shots	North American theatrical distribution only; produced by Lorimar Motion Pictures
October 23, 1987	The Sicilian	North American theatrical and television, U.K. and Irish distribution only; produced by Gladden Entertainment
November 6, 1987	Less than Zero	co-production with Avnet/Kerner Productions
December 11, 1987	Wall Street	co-production with Edward R. Pressman Film Corporation
December 16, 1987	Broadcast News	Nominated for the Academy Award for Best Picture. Nominated for the Golden Globe Award for Best Motion Picture – Musical or Comedy. Inducted into the National Film Registry in 2018. co-production with Gracie Films

=== 1988 ===
Release date	Title	Notes
February 12, 1988	Satisfaction	distribution only; produced by NBC Productions and Spelling/Greisman Productions
February 26, 1988	A Night in the Life of Jimmy Reardon (Note: Owned by Universal Pictures)	North American theatrical and home media distribution only; produced by Island Pictures
March 11, 1988	Off Limits	—
April 8, 1988	Bad Dreams	co-production with No Frills Film Productions
May 11, 1988	The Big Blue	distribution in Latin America, the U.K., Ireland, Australia, New Zealand, Germany, Austria, Spain, Portugal, Scandinavia, the Benelux and Japan only; produced by Gaumont
June 3, 1988	Big	Nominated for the Golden Globe Award for Best Motion Picture – Musical or Comedy. co-production with Gracie Films
July 6, 1988	License to Drive	co-production with Davis Entertainment and Licht/Mueller Film Corporation
July 15, 1988	Die Hard	Inducted into the National Film Registry in 2017. co-production with the Gordon Company and Silver Pictures
August 12, 1988	Young Guns (Note: Owned by Morgan Creek Entertainment)	North American theatrical and television distribution only; produced by Morgan Creek Productions
September 23, 1988	Dead Ringers	U.S. theatrical and television distribution only; produced by Morgan Creek Productions and Telefilm Canada
October 7, 1988	Alien Nation	—
November 23, 1988	Cocoon: The Return	co-production with the Zanuck/Brown Company
December 21, 1988	Working Girl	Nominated for the Academy Award for Best Picture. Winner of the Golden Globe Award for Best Motion Picture – Musical or Comedy.

=== 1989 ===
Release date	Title	Notes
January 13, 1989	Gleaming the Cube	North American theatrical and television distribution only; produced by Gladden Entertainment and the Turman-Foster Company
February 10, 1989	The Fly II	distribution only; produced by Brooksfilms
March 3, 1989	Skin Deep (Note: Owned by Morgan Creek Entertainment, with international rights licensed to Revolution Studios; home media, television and streaming rights are sub-licensed to Sony Pictures, with select distribution rights also sub-licensed to Relativity Media and Shout! Studios)	distribution in North America theatrically and on television, the U.K. and Ireland theatrically, Latin America, Australia, New Zealand, Spain and Japan only; produced by Morgan Creek Productions and Beco Films
April 14, 1989	Say Anything...	co-production with Gracie Films
May 19, 1989	How I Got into College	—
July 5, 1989	Weekend at Bernie's	North American theatrical and television and French theatrical distribution only; produced by Gladden Entertainment
August 9, 1989	The Abyss	—
August 25, 1989	Millennium	North American theatrical and television distribution only; produced by Gladden Entertainment
October 13, 1989	The Fabulous Baker Boys	North American theatrical and television distribution only; produced by Gladden Entertainment and Mirage Enterprises
October 20, 1989	When the Whales Came	British film; distribution only; produced by Golden Swan Films
October 27, 1989	Worth Winning	co-production with A&M Films
December 8, 1989	The War of the Roses	Nominated for the Golden Globe Award for Best Motion Picture – Musical or Comedy. co-production with Gracie Films and Regency International Pictures (uncredited)
December 13, 1989	Enemies, A Love Story	distribution in North America theatrically and on television, the U.K., Ireland and Scandinavia theatrically, Latin America, France, Turkey and Japan only; produced by Morgan Creek Productions

== 1990s ==
=== 1990 ===
Release date	Title	Notes
January 12, 1990	Downtown	—
February 16, 1990	Nightbreed	North American theatrical and television, Spanish, Australian and New Zealand distribution and U.K. and Irish theatrical co-distribution with Braveworld only; produced by Morgan Creek Productions
March 16, 1990	Nuns on the Run	North American distribution, West German, Austrian and Korean theatrical distribution only; produced by HandMade Films
April 13, 1990	Vital Signs	—
April 13, 1990	The Gods Must Be Crazy II	select international distribution only; distributed in North America by Weintraub Entertainment Group and Columbia Pictures (Note: Released in International theaters on July 26, 1989.)
May 4, 1990	Short Time	North American theatrical and television distribution only; produced by Gladden Entertainment
July 4, 1990	Die Hard 2	co-production with the Gordon Company and Silver Pictures
July 11, 1990	The Adventures of Ford Fairlane	co-production with Silver Pictures
August 1, 1990	Young Guns II	distribution outside the Benelux, Australia and New Zealand only; produced by Morgan Creek Productions
August 17, 1990	The Exorcist III	distribution outside the Benelux, Australia and New Zealand only; produced by Morgan Creek Productions
September 22, 1990	Miller's Crossing	distribution only; produced by Circle Films
September 28, 1990	Pacific Heights	distribution outside the Benelux, Australia and New Zealand only; produced by Morgan Creek Productions
October 5, 1990	Marked for Death	co-production with Victor & Grais Productions and Steamroller Productions
November 2, 1990	Frankenstein Unbound	North American distribution only; produced by the Mount Company and Concorde Pictures (uncredited)
November 16, 1990	Home Alone	Nominated for the Golden Globe Award for Best Motion Picture – Musical or Comedy. Inducted into the National Film Registry in 2023 co-production with Hughes Entertainment
November 21, 1990	Predator 2	co-production with the Gordon Company, Silver Pictures and Davis Entertainment
December 7, 1990	Edward Scissorhands	—
December 23, 1990	Come See the Paradise	—

=== 1991 ===
Release date	Title	Notes
February 8, 1991	Sleeping with the Enemy	—
March 15, 1991	Class Action	co-production with Interscope Communications
March 22, 1991	Teenage Mutant Ninja Turtles II: The Secret of the Ooze	international distribution outside Hong Kong and Taiwan only; produced by Golden Harvest; distributed in North America by New Line Cinema
March 29, 1991	The Five Heartbeats	—
May 13, 1991	Robin Hood	British film; co-production with Working Title Films; premiered in the U.S. on the Fox Network
May 17, 1991	Mannequin Two: On the Move	North American theatrical and television distribution only; produced by Gladden Entertainment
May 24, 1991	Only the Lonely	co-production with Hughes Entertainment
June 21, 1991	Dying Young	co-production with Fogwood Films
July 12, 1991	Point Break (Note: Owned by Library Rights Company (UK), Ltd. and Zelus Film Holding Company, LLC, with distribution rights licensed to Resurgence Media Group, which has sub-licensed U.S. rights to Shout! Studios and U.K. rights to Icon Film Distribution)	distribution outside Italy and Japan only; produced by Largo Entertainment and Tapestry Films
July 19, 1991	Dutch	co-production with Hughes Entertainment
July 26, 1991	Life Stinks	international distribution only; produced by Brooksfilms; distributed in North America by Metro-Goldwyn-Mayer
July 31, 1991	Hot Shots!	—
August 14, 1991	The Commitments (Note: Owned by Beacon Pictures, with distribution rights currently licensed to Resurgence Media Group, which has sub-licensed U.S. rights to Shout! Studios and U.K. rights to Icon Film Distribution)	Nominated for the Golden Globe Award for Best Motion Picture – Musical or Comedy. North American, U.K. and Irish distribution, German and Austrian theatrical distribution only; produced by Beacon Communications, the First Film Company and Dirty Hands Productions
August 21, 1991	Barton Fink	Winner of the Palme d'Or. North American distribution only; produced by Circle Films
September 13, 1991	A Matter of Degrees	U.S. theatrical distribution only; produced by Backbeat Productions and Fox Lorber Features
October 4, 1991	The Super	distribution outside Italy and Japan only; produced by Largo Entertainment
November 1, 1991	29th Street	North American and Turkish distribution only
November 22, 1991	For the Boys	co-production with All Girl Productions
December 25, 1991	Grand Canyon	—
December 27, 1991	Naked Lunch	U.S. distribution only; produced by Recorded Picture Company

=== 1992 ===
Release date	Title	Notes
January 31, 1992	Shining Through	co-production with Sandollar Productions
February 7, 1992	Back in the USSR	North American distribution only; produced by Largo Entertainment
February 21, 1992	This Is My Life	co-production with Lynda Obst Productions
March 13, 1992	My Cousin Vinny	—
March 27, 1992	White Men Can't Jump	—
April 10, 1992	FernGully: The Last Rainforest (Note: Owned by Machine Media Advisors, with distribution rights currently licensed to Shout! Studios)	distribution only; produced by FAI Films, Youngheart Productions and Kroyer Films
May 1, 1992	Folks!	North American distribution only; produced by Penta Pictures
May 22, 1992	Alien 3	co-production with Brandywine Productions
June 26, 1992	Unlawful Entry	distribution outside Italy and Japan only; produced by Largo Entertainment and JVC Entertainment
July 10, 1992	Prelude to a Kiss	co-production with the Gruskoff/Levy Company
July 17, 1992	Man Trouble	North American distribution only; produced by Penta Pictures, American Filmworks and Budding Grove Productions
July 31, 1992	Buffy the Vampire Slayer	co-production with Sandollar Productions and Kazui Enterprises
August 21, 1992	Rapid Fire	—
August 26, 1992	Storyville (Note: Owned by Sony Pictures)	North American theatrical distribution only; produced by Davis Entertainment and Edward R. Pressman Film Corporation
September 18, 1992	Jumpin' at the Boneyard	co-production with Kasdan Pictures
September 25, 1992	The Last of the Mohicans	North American distribution only
October 16, 1992	Night and the City	North American distribution only; co-production with Penta Entertainment and Tribeca
November 13, 1992	Love Potion No. 9	North American distribution only
November 20, 1992	Home Alone 2: Lost in New York	co-production with Hughes Entertainment
December 16, 1992	Used People	distribution outside Italy and Japan only; produced by Largo Entertainment and JVC Entertainment
December 18, 1992	Toys	co-production with Baltimore Pictures
December 25, 1992	Hoffa	co-production with Jersey Films and Edward R. Pressman Film Corporation; rights licensed to Guild Film Distribution for the U.K. and Ireland and Cecchi Gori Distribuzione for Italy

=== 1993 ===
Release date	Title	Notes
February 5, 1993	The Vanishing	—
March 5, 1993	Best of the Best 2	U.S. distribution, French, German and Austrian theatrical distribution only; produced by the Movie Group
March 19, 1993	Teenage Mutant Ninja Turtles III	international distribution outside Hong Kong and Taiwan only; produced by Golden Harvest; distributed in North America by New Line Cinema
March 26, 1993	Hear No Evil	North American distribution and Spanish co-distribution with Manuel Salvador only
April 2, 1993	Jack the Bear	co-production with American Filmworks and Lucky Dog Productions
April 7, 1993	The Sandlot	co-production with Island World
May 21, 1993	Hot Shots! Part Deux	—
June 18, 1993	Once Upon a Forest	distribution only; produced by Hanna-Barbera Productions and HTV Television
July 7, 1993	Rookie of the Year	—
July 28, 1993	Robin Hood: Men in Tights	North American and Swiss distribution only; produced by Brooksfilms and Gaumont
July 30, 1993	Rising Sun	co-production with Walrus & Associates
August 27, 1993	Only the Strong	North American distribution only; produced by Freestone Pictures and Davis Films
September 24, 1993	The Good Son	—
October 1, 1993	Freaked (Note: Co-owned by Drafthouse Films)	distribution only; produced by Tommy Productions; international rights licensed to Pandora Cinema
October 15, 1993	The Beverly Hillbillies	—
November 24, 1993	Mrs. Doubtfire	co-production with Blue Wolf Productions
December 29, 1993	Ghost in the Machine	—

=== 1994 ===
Release date	Title	Notes
February 25, 1994	Sugar Hill (Note: Distribution rights co-owned by Resurgence Media Group)	North American distribution only; produced by Beacon Communications and South Street Entertainment Group
March 4, 1994	The Chase	North American, U.K. and Irish distribution only; produced by Capitol Films
April 22, 1994	Bad Girls	co-production with Ruddy/Morgan Productions
April 29, 1994	PCU	—
June 10, 1994	Speed	co-production with the Mark Gordon Company
July 1, 1994	Baby's Day Out	co-production with Hughes Entertainment
July 15, 1994	True Lies (Note: Disney currently owns worldwide rights to True Lies, Fox having subsequently reclaimed international rights from Universal Pictures by 2010)	North American, French and French-speaking Swiss distribution and Italian co-distribution with Artisti Associati only; produced by Lightstorm Entertainment
August 5, 1994	Airheads	co-production with Island World and Robert Simonds Productions
September 30, 1994	The Scout	co-production with Ruddy/Morgan Productions
November 18, 1994	Miracle on 34th Street	co-production with Hughes Entertainment
November 23, 1994	The Pagemaster	North American distribution excluding free television, U.K., Irish, Benelux, German and Austrian theatrical distribution only; co-production with Turner Pictures and David Kirschner Productions
December 2, 1994	Trapped in Paradise	—
December 16, 1994	Nell	Nominated for the Golden Globe Award for Best Motion Picture – Drama. North and Latin American distribution only; produced by Egg Pictures

=== 1995 ===
Release date	Title	Notes
January 13, 1995	Far from Home: The Adventures of Yellow Dog	—
March 17, 1995	Bye Bye Love	co-production with Ubu Productions
April 5, 1995	Asterix Conquers America	distribution in the U.K, Ireland, France, Italy, Spain, Scandinavia, the Benelux and Eastern Europe only; produced by Extrafilm Produktion
April 21, 1995	Kiss of Death	—
May 5, 1995	French Kiss	North American distribution only; produced by PolyGram Filmed Entertainment, Working Title Films and Prufrock Pictures
May 19, 1995	Die Hard with a Vengeance (Note: Disney currently owns worldwide rights to Die Hard with a Vengeance: Cinergi sold the international rights to Fox for $11.25 million in July 1997, with territories covered by Summit Entertainment automatically reverted to Fox in May 31, 2002. Territories covered by BVI were originally set to expire on June 1, 2020; the latter would be acquired following Disney's acquisition of 20th Century Fox on March 20, 2019 instead)	North American and Japanese distribution only; co-production with Cinergi Pictures
May 24, 1995	Braveheart	Winner of the Academy Award for Best Picture. international distribution only; produced by Icon Productions and the Ladd Company; distributed in North America by Paramount Pictures
June 30, 1995	Mighty Morphin Power Rangers: The Movie	co-production with Fox Family Films, Saban Entertainment and Toei Company
July 12, 1995	Nine Months	co-production with 1492 Pictures
August 4, 1995	Bushwhacked	—
August 11, 1995 (Note: Released in Japanese theaters on May 27, 1995.)	A Walk in the Clouds	co-production with Zucker Brothers Productions
October 13, 1995	Strange Days (Note: International distribution rights owned by Universal Pictures (excluding Italy, Germany and Austria); Fox retains North American and Italian distribution rights)	North American, French and French-speaking Swiss distribution and Italian co-distribution with Artisti Associati only; produced by Lightstorm Entertainment
December 22, 1995	Waiting to Exhale	—

=== 1996 ===
Release date	Title	Notes
January 12, 1996	Dunston Checks In	co-production with Fox Family Films
February 9, 1996	Broken Arrow	co-production with The Mark Gordon Company and WCG Entertainment
March 1, 1996	Down Periscope	—
April 26, 1996	The Truth About Cats & Dogs	co-production with Noon Attack
May 3, 1996	The Great White Hype	co-production with Atman Entertainment and Fred Berner Films
July 3, 1996	Independence Day	co-production with Centropolis Entertainment
July 12, 1996	Courage Under Fire	co-production with Fox 2000 Pictures (uncredited), Davis Entertainment, Joseph M. Singer Entertainment and Friendly Films
August 2, 1996	Chain Reaction	co-production with The Zanuck Company and Chicago Pacific Entertainment
October 4, 1996	That Thing You Do!	co-production with Clinica Estetico and Clavius Base
November 1, 1996	Romeo + Juliet	co-production with Bazmark Productions
November 22, 1996	Jingle All the Way	co-production with Fox Family Films and 1492 Pictures
November 27, 1996	The Crucible	—
December 20, 1996	One Fine Day	co-production with Fox 2000 Pictures (uncredited), Lynda Obst Productions and Via Rosa Productions

=== 1997 ===
Release date	Title	Notes
March 28, 1997	Turbo: A Power Rangers Movie	distribution outside Israel and Japan under Fox Family Films (uncredited) only; produced by Saban Entertainment and Toei Company
April 4, 1997	Inventing the Abbotts	co-production with Fox 2000 Pictures (uncredited) and Imagine Entertainment
April 25, 1997	Volcano	co-production with Fox 2000 Pictures (uncredited), Shuler Donner/Donner Productions and Moritz Original
June 13, 1997	Speed 2: Cruise Control	co-production with Blue Tulip Productions
July 2, 1997	Out to Sea	co-production with Davis Entertainment
August 1, 1997	Picture Perfect	co-production with 3 Arts Entertainment
September 26, 1997	The Edge	co-production with Art Linson Productions
September 26, 1997	Soul Food	distribution only; produced by Fox 2000 Pictures and Edmonds Entertainment
October 24, 1997	A Life Less Ordinary	distribution outside the U.K., Ireland, Australia, New Zealand, France, Germany, Austria, Switzerland, Spain and the Benelux only; produced by Figment Films and Channel Four Films
November 7, 1997	Cold Around the Heart	co-production with Illusion Entertainment and Baumgarten-Prophet Entertainment
November 21, 1997	Anastasia	co-production with Fox Family Films and Fox Animation Studios
November 26, 1997	Alien Resurrection	co-production with Brandywine Productions
December 12, 1997	Home Alone 3	co-production with Fox Family Films and Hughes Entertainment
December 19, 1997	Titanic (Note: Paramount Pictures owns domestic rights, while Disney owns international rights)	Winner of the Academy Award for Best Picture. Winner of the Golden Globe Award for Best Motion Picture – Drama. Inducted into the National Film Registry in 2017 international distribution only; co-production with Paramount Pictures and Lightstorm Entertainment

=== 1998 ===
Release date	Title	Notes
January 9, 1998	Firestorm	—
January 30, 1998	Great Expectations	co-production with Art Linson Productions
February 20, 1998	Dangerous Beauty	international distribution in all media excluding television only; produced by Regency Enterprises and Bedford Falls Productions; distributed in North America by Warner Bros. Renamed as The Greatest Courtesan in the United Kingdom and A Destiny of Her Own in some regions
March 27, 1998	The Newton Boys	co-production with Detour Filmproduction
March 27, 1998	No Looking Back	international distribution only; produced by Marlboro Road Gang, Good Machine and South Fork Pictures; distributed in North America by PolyGram Filmed Entertainment under Gramercy Pictures
April 17, 1998	The Object of My Affection	—
May 15, 1998	Bulworth	co-production with Mulholland Productions; Nominated for the Golden Globe Award for Best Motion Picture – Musical or Comedy
May 29, 1998	Hope Floats	co-production with Lynda Obst Productions and Fortis Films
June 19, 1998	The X-Files	co-production with Ten Thirteen Productions
June 26, 1998	Dr. Dolittle	co-production with Davis Entertainment, Joseph M. Singer Entertainment and Friendly Films
July 15, 1998	There's Something About Mary	co-production with Conundrum Entertainment; Nominated for the Golden Globe Award for Best Motion Picture – Musical or Comedy
July 31, 1998	Ever After: A Cinderella Story	co-production with Fox Family Films and Mireille Soria Production
August 14, 1998	How Stella Got Her Groove Back	NAACP Image Award for Outstanding Motion Picture
November 6, 1998	The Siege	co-production with Lynda Obst Productions
November 6, 1998	A Cool, Dry Place	distribution only; produced by Fox 2000 Pictures
December 23, 1998	The Thin Red Line (Note: Co-owned by Content Partners, LLC)	distribution outside continental European television and Japan only; produced by Fox 2000 Pictures, Phoenix Pictures and Geisler-Roberdau; Nominated for the Academy Award for Best Picture; Nominated for Critics' Choice Movie Award for Best Picture

=== 1999 ===
Release date	Title	Notes
February 5, 1999	Simply Irresistible	distribution in all media excluding international television outside Italy only; produced by Regency Enterprises, Polar Entertainment and TaurusFilm
February 19, 1999	Office Space	co-production with Judgemental Films
March 12, 1999	Wing Commander	distribution in North and Latin America, the U.K., Ireland, Australia, New Zealand, South Africa and the Benelux and German and Austrian co-distribution with Jugendfilm only; produced by No Prisoners Productions, Digital Anvil, Origin Systems and the Carousel Picture Company
March 19, 1999	Ravenous	distribution only; produced by Fox 2000 Pictures, Adam Fields Productions and Heyday Films
April 9, 1999	Never Been Kissed	distribution only; produced by Fox 2000 Pictures, Flower Films and Bushwood Pictures
April 23, 1999	Pushing Tin	distribution in all media excluding international television outside Italy only; produced by Fox 2000 Pictures, Regency Enterprises, Linson Films and TaurusFilm
April 30, 1999	Entrapment	distribution in all media excluding international television outside Italy only; co-production with Regency Enterprises, Fountainbridge Films and TaurusFilm
May 19, 1999	Star Wars: Episode I – The Phantom Menace	distribution only; produced by Lucasfilm Ltd.
July 16, 1999	Lake Placid (Note: Co-owned by Sony Pictures)	distribution outside continental Europe and Japan only; produced by Fox 2000 Pictures, Phoenix Pictures and Rocking Chair Productions
August 13, 1999	Brokedown Palace	distribution only; produced by Fox 2000 Pictures and Adam Fields Productions
October 1, 1999	Drive Me Crazy	—
October 15, 1999	Fight Club	distribution in all media excluding international television outside Italy only; produced by Fox 2000 Pictures, Regency Enterprises, Linson Films and TaurusFilm
November 10, 1999	Light it Up	distribution only; produced by Fox 2000 Pictures and Edmonds Entertainment
November 12, 1999	Anywhere but Here	distribution only; produced by Fox 2000 Pictures and Laurence Mark Productions
December 17, 1999	Anna and the King	distribution only; produced by Fox 2000 Pictures and Lawrence Bender Productions

== See also ==
- 20th Century Fox
- List of 20th Century Fox films (2000–2020)

== Notes ==
Release notes
