= Ann Todd (American actress) =

American actress and librarian (1931–2020)

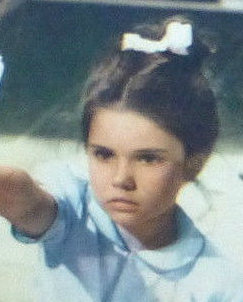
- Todd in Stronger Than Desire (1939)
- Born: Ann Todd Phillips; August 26, 1931; Denver, Colorado, U.S.
- Died: February 7, 2020 (aged 88); Berkeley, California, U.S.
- Occupations: Child actress, Librarian
- Years active: 1939–1953
- Spouse: Robert Basart (m. 1951; died 1993)
- Children: 2

Ann Todd (born Ann Todd Phillips, later Ann Basart or Ann Phillips Basart; August 26, 1931 – February 7, 2020) was an American child actress. She was credited in four films as Ann E. Todd. As an adult, she became a music reference librarian at University of California, Berkeley.

== Early years ==
Todd was born in 1931 in Denver, Colorado, to Burrill L. and Alberta C. (née Mayfield) Phillips. She had a younger brother, Stephen (1937–1986). She was a distant relative of Mary Todd Lincoln. Due to the privations of the Great Depression, she was raised by her maternal grandparents, Mr. and Mrs. Albert Ulysses Mayfield, her adoptive name was Ann Todd Mayfield. (A Newspaper Enterprise Association story published June 13, 1940, refers to Mrs. A.U. Mayfield as Todd's mother.)

In 1942, Todd was hospitalized in critical condition when blood poisoning developed after she cut her foot playing a game in her backyard.

== Film career ==
Todd made her acting debut in Zaza (1939) directed by George Cukor. In a career spanning over 14 years, she appeared in almost 40 movies alongside such stars as Ingrid Bergman, Leslie Howard, Shirley Temple, James Stewart, John Garfield, Bette Davis, Barbara Stanwyck, and Marlene Dietrich.

Due to the similarities between her name and the established British actress Ann Todd, she added the initial "E." to her name. Todd was a regular in The Stu Erwin Show from 1950 to 1953. She became a teacher and librarian in her later life.

== Librarian and academic career ==
After graduating from the University of California, Los Angeles, she attended the University of California, Berkeley, where she obtained a master's degree in library science in 1958 and a Master of Arts in 1960. She was a reference librarian at U.C. Berkeley from 1960 to 1961 and 1970 to 1990. Among her accomplishments was founding and editing Cum Notis Variorum, the library's newsletter, which gained a substantial reputation. Additionally Basart wrote reviews for the Music Library Association publication Notes as well as serving as its music review editor and book review editor.

She taught at the San Francisco College for Women and at the University of California, Berkeley.

In 1984, Basart established Fallen Leaf Press, publishing reference books in music as well as scores of contemporary American chamber music. Basart closed the business in 2000.

In 1993, she was recognized by the Music Library Association for lifetime achievement.

== Filmography ==
Year	Title	Role	Notes
1937	Rosalie	Little girl	uncredited, listed in casting sheet as Ann Todd Mayfield
1938	Man-Proof	Little girl	uncredited, listed in casting sheet as Ann Todd Mayfield
1938	Stolen Heaven	Little girl	uncredited, listed in casting sheet as Ann Todd Mayfield
1939	Zaza	Toto	
1939	Calling Dr. Kildare	Jenny	uncredited
1939	The Zero Hour	Beth	
1939	Stronger Than Desire	Susan Flagg	
1939	Intermezzo	Ann Marie	
1939	Bad Little Angel	Libbit Creighton, age 9	uncredited
1939	Tower of London	Princess	uncredited
1939	Destry Rides Again	Claggett girl	
1940	The Blue Bird	Little Sister	
1940	Dr. Ehrlich's Magic Bullet	Marianne	uncredited
1940	Granny Get Your Gun	Charlotte	
1940	Little Orvie	Patsy Balliser	
1940	All This, and Heaven Too	Berthe	
1940	Brigham Young	Mary Kent	
1940	Keeping Company	First stooge	uncredited
1941	Blood and Sand	Carmen, as a child	
1941	Bad Men of Missouri	Amy Younger	
1941	Private Nurse	Barbara Winton	
1941	How Green Was My Valley	Ceinwen	
1941	The Men in Her Life	Rose	
1941	Remember the Day	Kate Hill	
1942	Kings Row	Randy Monaghan, as a child	
1942	On the Sunny Side	Betty	
1942	Beyond the Blue Horizon	Tama, as a child	uncredited
1942	That Other Woman	Young girl	uncredited
1942	Over My Dead Body	Tailor's little girl	
1943	Dixie Dugan	Imogene Dugan	
1945	Roughly Speaking	Louise Randall, as a child	
1945	Pride of the Marines	Loretta Merchant	
1946	My Reputation	Gretchen Van Orman	
1946	The Jolson Story	Ann Murray, as a child	uncredited
1946	Margie	Joyce Fontayne	
1947	Homesteaders of Paradise Valley	Melinda Hill	
1947	Dangerous Years	Doris Martin	credited as Ann E. Todd
1948	Three Daring Daughters	Ilka Morgan	credited as Ann E. Todd
1948	Arthur Takes Over	Valarie Jeanne Bradford	credited as Ann E. Todd
1949	Cover Up	Cathie Weatherby	credited as Ann E. Todd
1950 to 1953	The Stu Erwin Show	Joyce Erwin (TV series, supporting role)	
1951	The Lion Hunters	Jean Forbes	
