= Little Orvie =

1940 film

- Directed by: Ray McCarey
- Screenplay by: Lynn Root; Frank Fenton; Robert Chapin
- Based on: from the novel by Booth Tarkington
- Produced by: William Sistrom
- Starring: John Sheffield; Ernest Truex; Dorothy Tree; Ann Todd
- Cinematography: Roy Hunt, A.S.C.
- Edited by: Theron Warth
- Music by: Paul Sawtell
- Production company: An RKO Radio Picture
- Distributed by: RKO Radio Pictures, Inc.
- Release date: March 1, 1940
- Running time: 68 minutes
- Country: United States
- Language: English

Little Orvie is a 1940 American comedy-drama film directed by Ray McCarey and written by Lynn Root, Frank Fenton and Robert Chapin. The film stars John Sheffield, Ernest Truex, Dorothy Tree, and Ann Todd. It was released on March 1, 1940, by RKO Pictures.

== Plot ==
Youngster Orvie really wants a dog, but his parents tell him that he cannot have one. Nevertheless, he finds a stray dog and decides to keep it for a day.

== Cast ==
- John Sheffield as Orvie Stone
- Ernest Truex as Frank Stone
- Dorothy Tree as Clara Stone
- Ann Todd as Patsy Balliser
- Emma Dunn as Mrs. Welty
- Daisy Mothershed as Corbina
- Fay Helm as Mrs. Balliser
- Virginia Brissac as Mrs. Green
- Paul Burns as Grocer
- Del Henderson as Mr. Brown
- Fern Emmett as Mrs. Jackson
- Edgar Dearing as Policeman
- Ray Turner as Jefferson
