= Frank Yablans =

American screenwriter and film producer (1935 - 2014)

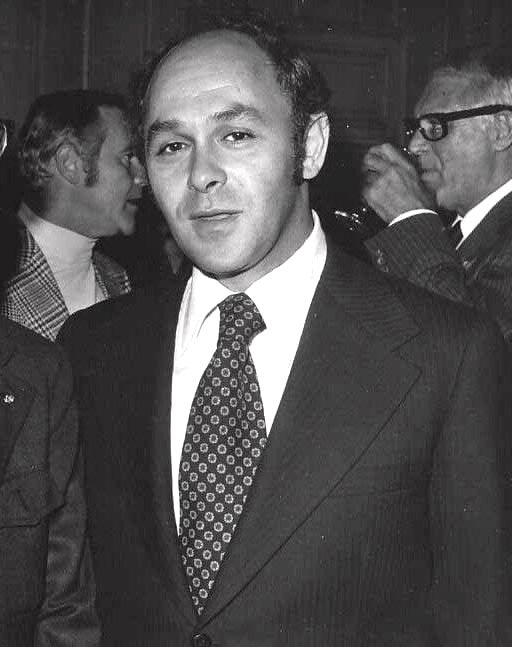
- Yablans in 1972
- Born: August 27, 1935; New York City, New York, U.S.
- Died: November 27, 2014 (aged 79); Los Angeles, California, U.S.
- Occupations: Film producer Studio head
- Known for: President of Paramount Pictures
- Spouse: Ruth Edelstein (m. 1958; div. 1990)
- Partner: Nadia Pandolfo
- Children: 3

Frank Yablans (August 27, 1935 – November 27, 2014) was an American studio executive, film producer, and screenwriter. Yablans served as an executive at Paramount Pictures, serving president of the studio from 1971 to 1974. As head of Paramount, he oversaw the release and marketing of The Godfather (1972), The Godfather Part II (1974), and Chinatown (1974). After leaving Paramount, he produced films for 20th Century Fox and Metro-Goldwyn-Mayer (MGM).

== Early life ==
Frank Yablans was born in Brooklyn, New York to Annette and Morris Yablans. Yablans' father was a taxi driver. His older brother, Irwin Yablans, produced Halloween (1978). Yablans was Jewish.

== Career ==
Yablans entered the motion picture business in 1956, joining Warner Bros. sales. In 1959, he joined Buena Vista as the Milwaukee sales manager where he stayed until 1966. He joined Sigma III and later transitioned to Filmways after it acquired Sigma III.

He became executive vice president of sales for Paramount Pictures in June 1969, where his marketing of the film Love Story (1970) led to his appointment as Paramount Studios' president on May 10, 1971.

As head of Paramount, he oversaw the release and marketing of The Godfather (1972), The Godfather Part II (1974), and Chinatown (1974). He also personally supervised the 100th birthday celebrations of studio founder Adolph Zukor in January 1973. Following a reorganization at Paramount in which Charles Bluhdorn, the chairman and CEO of Gulf & Western Industries, was replaced by Barry Diller, Yablans announced his resignation as president on November 8, 1974. According to Diller, Yablans was corrupt during his time as president of Paramount, making lavish deals, squandering studio money on non-film projects such as real estate development, and accepting bribes from people such as National Amusement head Sumner Redstone, stating that he first learned of these bribes from Bluhdorn.

After leaving Paramount he became an independent producer, working primarily through Paramount and 20th Century Fox. He was executive producer of Silver Streak (1976), The Other Side of Midnight (1977), Congo (1995), and the HBO series Rome. He also produced and adapted the screenplays for North Dallas Forty (1979) and Mommie Dearest (1981), both based on books.

Yablans was recruited by Kirk Kerkorian to head his troubled and debt-laden film company Metro-Goldwyn-Mayer (MGM). While Yablans' reorganization of MGM and United Artists (UA) into a single entity (as MGM/UA) served to reduce costs and overhead, the company continued to lose value, and in 1986 was purchased by Ted Turner Productions for a reported $1.25 billion. He then formed Northstar Entertainment Corporation, with a partnership at Producers Sales Organization. In 1986, he set up a two-year, seven-picture agreement with low-budget studio Empire International to produce feature films. In 1987, director Arthur Seidelman partnered with Yablans to produce feature films.

In 2000, Yablans and partners Cindy Bond, Charlie Stuart Gay and Ron Booth founded Promenade Pictures, a production and marketing company committed to "family-friendly" entertainment. Its most ambitious project was the "Epic Stories of the Bible" series of CGI-animated features, starting with The Ten Commandments (2007) and Noah's Ark: The New Beginning (2012).

== Death ==
Yablans died on Thanksgiving, November 27, 2014, from natural causes at the age of 79. He had three children – Robert Yablans (deceased), Sharon Abrams, and Edward Yablans.
