= Edward L. Alperson =

American film producer

- Born: November 13, 1895; Omaha, Nebraska, US
- Died: July 3, 1969 (aged 73); Beverly Hills, California, US
- Occupation: movie producer

Edward Lee Alperson (November 13, 1895 – July 3, 1969) was an American film producer who started Grand National Films Inc. and later released his productions through 20th Century Fox. He was the father of Edward L. Alperson Jr. (April 3, 1925 – October 31, 2006).

== Biography ==
Alperson was born on November 13, 1895, in Omaha, Nebraska. He started his Hollywood career as a film salesman for B. P. Schulberg's Preferred Pictures Corporation. Prior to the firm's 1925 bankruptcy, Alperson joined the film distribution section of Warner Bros. in 1924. During his time at Warners Alperson developed a close friendship with Spyros Skouras, then the head of Warner Bros. Theaters, eventually becoming his assistant.

In 1934, Alperson formed Grand National Distributors initially to distribute films from independent producers and British films to be released in America. However, in 1936 he expanded Grand National into Grand National Pictures to produce its own films and acquired the studio complex of the defunct Educational Pictures as a production facility. Grand National initially began with a variety of low-budgeted films, including westerns with Tex Ritter, a Renfrew of the Royal Mounted series, singing cowgirl Dorothy Page, adventure films shot in Cinecolor, melodramas such as In His Steps, based on the book of the same name, and it released British films such as Boris Karloff's Juggernaut.

What promised to be Alperson's good fortune turned out to be his downfall when he befriended James Cagney, then on suspension from Warner Bros. Alperson produced a crime film for Cagney called Great Guy, but when Cagney refused another crime film, Angels With Dirty Faces—later filmed by Cagney at Warners—the studio overspent on a musical for Cagney, Something to Sing About, that was a major box-office failure and spelled the end of Grand National. He bounced back, however, in 1942 as the general manager of RKO Pictures' theater circuit.

He had kept in contact with his friend and mentor Spyros Skouras over the years, and when Alperson acquired the film rights to Somerset Maughan's The Razor's Edge he negotiated a deal to produce films as an independent producer for 20th Century Fox in exchange for turning over the film rights to the property to Fox. The first film he produced for Fox was Black Beauty. His films used a variety of names for the production company such as "Alco", "Alson", "Alplee" and "National Pictures". His son Edward Jr. shared in the producer's duties on these films and composed or co-wrote the musical score for some of them.

Finishing with Fox after September Storm (1960), Alperson acquired distribution rights to a pair of Japanese science-fiction films, The Last War and The Human Vapor. He later (1963) acquired the film rights to director Billy Wilder's Irma La Douce—his last project of note—for Mirisch Productions but without the music. Alperson had made an agreement with Mirisch for 25% of the profits of the film and won his case in court when there were problems with the arrangements.

Alperson died on July 3, 1969, in Beverly Hills, Los Angeles, California.
