= On the Sunny Side (1942 film) =

1942 film by Harold Schuster

- Directed by: Harold Schuster
- Screenplay by: Lillie Hayward and George Templeton
- Based on: suggested by the story "Fraternity" by Mary C. McCall, Jr.
- Produced by: Lou Ostrow (uncredited)
- Starring: Roddy McDowall; Jane Darwell; Stanley Clements; Katharine Alexander; Don Douglas; Freddie Mercer; Ann Todd; Jill Esmond
- Cinematography: Lucien Andriot, A.S.C.
- Edited by: Fred Allen
- Music by: Emil Newman (musical direction); Leigh Harline; Cyril J. Mockridge; David Raksin (uncredited)
- Distributed by: Twentieth Century-Fox Film Corporation
- Release date: February 13, 1942
- Running time: 69 minutes
- Country: United States
- Language: English

On the Sunny Side is a 1942 United States home front during World War II film, directed by Harold Schuster, starring Roddy McDowall, Jane Darwell, Stanley Clements, Katharine Alexander, Don Douglas, Freddie Mercer, Ann Todd and Jill Esmond. The screenplay is suggested by "Fraternity", a short story by Mary C. McCall, Jr., published in the February 1, 1941 issue of Collier's magazine.

== Plot ==
Hugh Aylesworth, is a well-bred English youth who is evacuated to America during the London Blitz. Hugh moves into the home of Mr. and Mrs. Andrews. The couple's own son Don, feels neglected and considers Hugh a royal pain in the posterior.

== Cast ==
- Roddy McDowall as Hugh Aylesworth
- Jane Darwell as Annie
- Stanley Clements as Tom Sanders
- Katharine Alexander as Mrs. Andrews
- Don Douglas as Mr. Andrews
- Freddie Mercer as Don Andrews
- Ann Todd as Betty
- Jill Esmond as Mrs. Aylesworth
- Freddie Walburn as Dick
- Leon Tyler as Flip
- Billy Benedict as Messenger
- Stuart Robertson as Broadcast Announcer
- Whiskers as Angus
