= September Storm =

1960 3D American adventure film by Byron Haskin

- This example of the film's poster was altered for use by theaters that showed it "flat" in 2D: a "CINEMASCOPE" paste-over hides the original "STEREO-VISION" promotion, and other, smaller paste-overs, now missing but their locations still apparent from residual adhesive stains, were used to conceal other references to the 3D.
- Directed by: Byron Haskin
- Screenplay by: W. R. Burnett
- Story by: Steve Fisher
- Produced by: Edward L. Alperson
- Starring: Joanne Dru; Mark Stevens; Robert Strauss
- Cinematography: Jorge Stahl; Lamar Boren (underwater photography)
- Edited by: Alberto Valenzuela
- Music by: Edward L. Alperson Jr. Raoul Kraushaar
- Distributed by: 20th Century Fox
- Release date: September 9, 1960
- Running time: 89 minutes
- Country: United States
- Language: English

September Storm is a 1960 American 3D adventure film directed by Byron Haskin and starring Joanne Dru and Mark Stevens.

Filmed in 3D and DeLuxe Color and presented in CinemaScope, it is notable as the only U.S. feature film made in 3D between Revenge of the Creature, which was released in the spring of 1955 and marked the end of the 1950s 3D movie fad in the U.S., and The Bubble, which premiered in late 1966 and introduced the economical "over-and-under" single-strip format used by most of the 3D films of the 1970s through early-2000s.

== Plot ==
American fashion model Anne Traymore, swimming off the isle of Majorca, loses a bracelet, which the handsome Manuel del Rio Montoya returns to her. She believes he owns a beautiful yacht called The Swan, but he merely works on it for the wealthy Rene LeClerc.

A couple of fortune hunters, Balfour and Williams, claim they know where $3 million in gold doubloons can be found, but need a boat. They offer a share to Anne and Manuel, and the latter deceives LeClerc by claiming the boat needs three weeks of repairs.

A raging storm causes the propeller to be clogged by seaweed. Balfour dives to clear it and is stung by a man-o-war. He is taken to an island to recover. Manuel professes his love for Anne, who rejects him, Balfour having caught her eye instead. An angry Manuel tries to leave and gets into a fight with Williams that nearly sinks the vessel.

After the divers bring up the loot, Williams decides to strand the others and keep it all to himself. By now, LeClerc has become aware of the deception and intercepts them, but he is talked out of contacting the law by being offered a share of the money. The Coast Guard, alas, arrives to confiscate it all.

== Cast ==
- Joanne Dru as Anne Traymore
- Mark Stevens as Joe Balfour
- Robert Strauss as Ernie Williams
- Asher Dann as Manuel del Rio Montoya
- Jean-Pierre Kérien as LeClerc

== Production ==
Like the feature-length 3D films of the 1950s when they were originally released, it was projected by the polarized light method and viewed through gray Polaroid filters in viewers which, according to the film's poster, were "scientifically designed by master craftsmen!" Most theaters, however, presented it "flat", in 2-D.

Although it is widely believed to have been filmed in Stereovision, Bob Furmanek, who oversaw the 2016 restoration, says this is a myth. It was shot full-frame with the original NaturalVision cameras used on Bwana Devil. The center of the image was then extracted to create a 2.35:1 aspect ratio, in the manner of the then-current Superscope process. Unfortunately, it was poorly done, resulting in a large number of badly-framed shots; for example, the scene with the Flamenco dancers has a huge amount of headroom while their feet are cut off.

== Reception ==
Both September Storm and 3D in general were roundly dismissed by influential critic Bosley Crowther in his New York Times review.

== Restoration and re-release ==
As of August 2, 2016, "a 3-D Restoration has been slated to begin. The 3-D Film Archive has already obtained, for a limited time, the rights to restore and distribute SEPTEMBER STORM, but the hard work is still ahead of us. Both the left eye and right eye film elements will need to be digitally scanned, frame by frame. We will need to assess the level of damage to these existing elements, and determine how to best fix the images. This will require a stereoscopic re-alignment pass, left and right color restoration and matching, and clean-up of scratches and other damages to the film surface. This is very challenging post-production work, and can potentially be very expensive. Fortunately, the 3-D Film Archive already has a great track record from its previous restoration projects, and by teaming up with 3-D SPACE and maintaining this work "in house" costs will be kept at a manageable level. We are confident that we will be able to produce both a 3-D blu-ray master and a digital cinema package (DCP) that will look fantastic."

== See also ==
- List of 3D films
