= Arthur Takes Over =

- Theatrical release poster
- Directed by: Malcolm St. Clair
- Screenplay by: Mauri Grashin
- Produced by: Sol M. Wurtzel
- Starring: Lois Collier; Richard Crane; Skip Homeier; Ann E. Todd; Jerome Cowan
- Cinematography: Benjamin H. Kline
- Edited by: Roy V. Livingston
- Music by: Darrell Calker
- Production company: 20th Century Fox
- Distributed by: 20th Century Fox
- Release date: April 7, 1948
- Running time: 63 minutes
- Country: United States
- Language: English

Arthur Takes Over is a 1948 American comedy film directed by Malcolm St. Clair and written by Mauri Grashin. The film stars Lois Collier, Richard Crane, Skip Homeier, Ann E. Todd and Jerome Cowan. The film was released on April 7, 1948, by 20th Century Fox.

== Plot ==
Mrs. Bixby (Barbara Brown) is determined that her daughter Margaret (Lois Collier) will marry a successful man and arrange a match. Margaret, however, marries her sweetheart James (Richard Crane), but insists the couple keep it a secret from her mother. The groom objects to this deception, but acquiesced. In an attempt to distract their mother, Margaret's younger brother (Howard Freeman) pretends to be engaged, but only makes matters worse. Ultimately the mother discovers and truth and acknowledges that her daughter has married for love.

== Cast ==
- Lois Collier as Margaret Bixby
- Richard Crane as James Clark
- Skip Homeier as Arthur Bixby
- Ann E. Todd as Valarie Jeanne Bradford
- Jerome Cowan as George Bradford
- Barbara Brown as Fiora Bixby
- William Bakewell as Lawrence White
- Howard Freeman as Bert Bixby
- Joan Blair as Mrs. Bradford
- Almira Sessions as Mrs. Barnafogle
- Jeanne Gail as Betty Lou
- Donald Kerr as Cab Driver
- Luana Walters as Newspaper Woman

== Retrospective appraisal ==
Arthur Takes Over is representative of the low-budget “B” movies that director St. Clair made at the end of his career. Film historian Ruth Anne Dwyer reports that the scripts offered to St. Clair at 20th Century Fox in the late 1940s were “the weakest he had encountered” from the studio.”

Though Arthur Takes Over exhibits “some charm and reasonable production values” the storyline is decidedly weak, “almost plotless.”
