= Private Nurse =

1941 film by David Burton

- Theatrical release poster
- Directed by: David Burton
- Screenplay by: Samuel G. Engel
- Produced by: Sol M. Wurtzel
- Starring: Jane Darwell; Brenda Joyce; Sheldon Leonard; Robert Lowery; Ann Todd; Kay Linaker
- Cinematography: Virgil Miller
- Edited by: Al De Gaetano
- Music by: Emil Newman
- Production company: Twentieth Century-Fox Film Corp.
- Distributed by: 20th Century Fox
- Release date: August 22, 1941
- Running time: 61 minutes
- Country: United States
- Language: English

Private Nurse is a 1941 American drama film directed by David Burton, written by Samuel G. Engel and stars Jane Darwell, Brenda Joyce, Sheldon Leonard, Robert Lowery, Ann Todd and Kay Linaker. The B film was released on August 22, 1941, by 20th Century Fox.

== Plot ==
Nurse Mary Malloy and senior nurse Miss Adams are assigned to maintain the health of alcoholic playboy Henry Hoyt, but Mary is subsequently hired by former gangster John Winton to care for his young daughter Barbara who has been told that her mother Helene is dead. However, the daughter does not know about her father's past nor that her mother is actually alive. The nurse has to be the one to deliver the truth.

== Cast ==
- Jane Darwell as Miss Adams
- Brenda Joyce as Mary Malloy
- Sheldon Leonard as John Winton
- Robert Lowery as Henry Hoyt
- Ann Todd as Barbara Winton
- Kay Linaker as Helene
- Frank Sully as Eddie
- Ferike Boros as Mrs. Goldberg
- Claire DuBrey as Flower Shop Manager
- Leonard Carey as Smitty
- Clara Blandick as Miss Phillips
- Myra Marsh as Miss Sheaffer
- George Chandler as Messenger Boy
- Steve O'Brien as Messenger Boy

Uncredited (in order of appearance)
Fern Emmett	nurse at Lexington Nurse's Registry
Sarah Edwards	nurse at Lexington Nurse's Registry
Dick Dickinson	Yogi at Henry Hoyt's apartment
Pat O'Malley	drunken guest at Henry Hoyt's apartment
Jack Norton	drunken guest at Henry Hoyt's apartment
Ernie Stanton	John Winton's butler
Edwin Stanley	doctor who examines Barbara Winton's injured leg
Bud Geary	Winton's henchman
John Elliott	clerk at party supplies store
Leila McIntyre	customer in Helene's flower shop
J. Pat O'Malley	Henry's drinking buddy
Harry Strang	taxi driver
Hugh Beaumont	McDonald
