= Tarzan and the Mermaids =

1948 film by Robert Florey

- Directed by: Robert Florey
- Screenplay by: Carroll Young; Albert de Pina
- Based on: Characters created by Edgar Rice Burroughs
- Produced by: Sol Lesser
- Starring: Johnny Weissmuller; Brenda Joyce; George Zucco; Andrea Palma
- Cinematography: Jack Draper; Gabriel Figueroa
- Edited by: Merrill G. White
- Music by: Dimitri Tiomkin
- Distributed by: RKO Radio Pictures Inc.
- Release dates: April 27, 1948 (Premiere-Los Angeles); May 15, 1948 (U.S.)
- Running time: 68 minutes
- Language: English

Tarzan and the Mermaids is a 1948 American adventure film based on the Tarzan character created by Edgar Rice Burroughs. Directed by Robert Florey, it was the last of twelve Tarzan films to star Johnny Weissmuller in the title role, with the following sixteen (eighteen counting remakes) films in the series featuring alternating actors between main and supporting, while maintaining a single continuity. It was also the first Tarzan film since 1939 not to feature the character Boy, adopted son of Tarzan and Jane (Boy was described in the film as being away at school, and the character never returned to the series).

It was followed by Tarzan's Magic Fountain in 1949, starring Lex Barker as Tarzan, alongside a returning Brenda Joyce as Jane.

== Plot ==
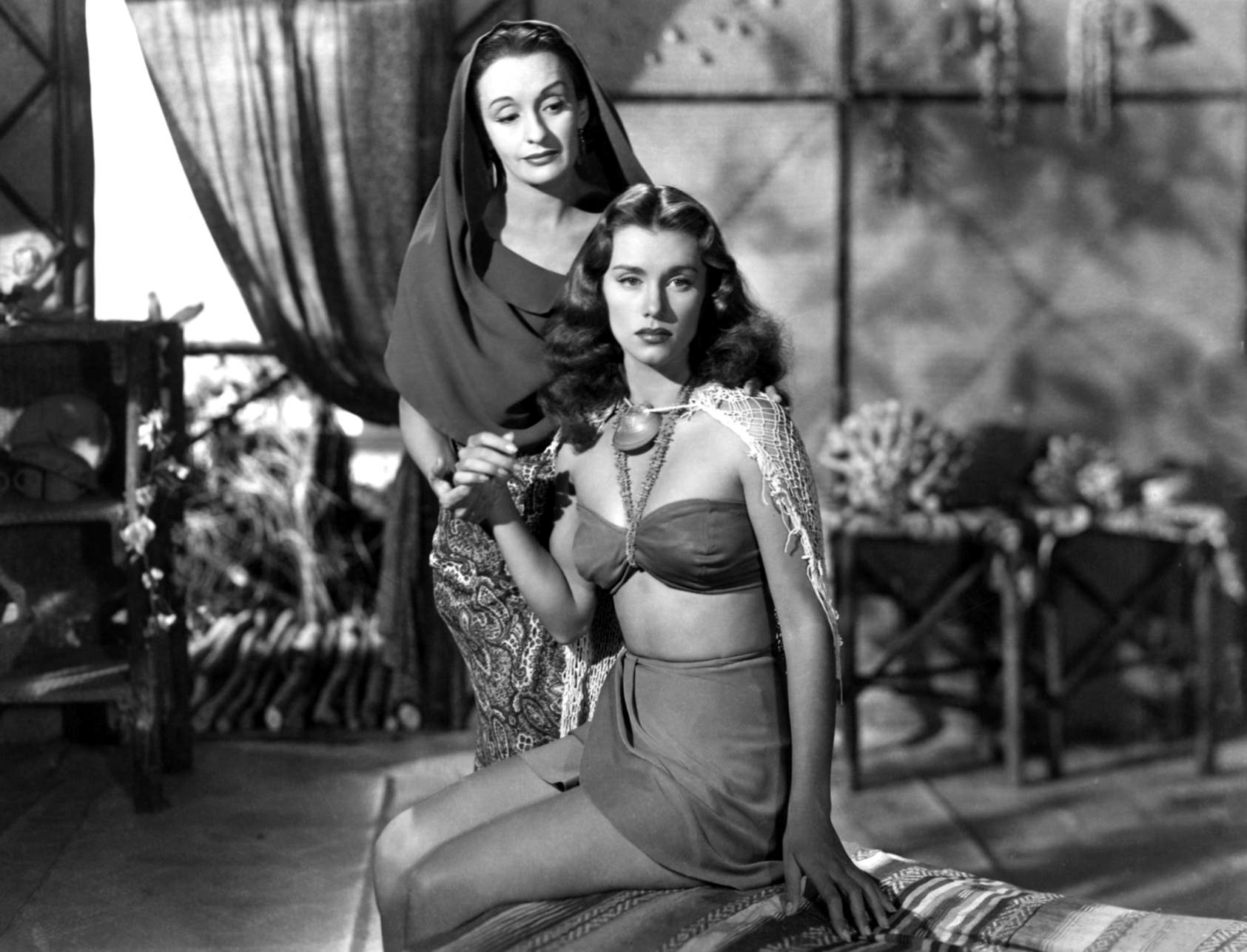
Mexican actresses Linda Christian and Andrea Palma in a scene of the film.

The setting is a forbidden African island where swimming and diving are central to the culture, hence the term "the Mermaids." Tarzan and Jane (Brenda Joyce) help a native girl (Linda Christian) who has fled the village to avoid a forced marriage to a supposed local god. George Zucco portrays Palanth, the corrupt high priest attempting to force the girl into marriage, and Fernando Wagner plays a con man impersonating the god Balu.

== Cast ==
- Johnny Weissmuller as Tarzan
- Brenda Joyce as Jane
- George Zucco as Palanth, the High Priest
- Andrea Palma as Luana, Mara's Mother
- Fernando Wagner as Varga, Pearl Trader
- Edward Ashley as Commissioner
- John Laurenz as Benji
- Gustavo Rojo as Tiko, Mara's Fiancé
- Matthew Boulton as British Inspector-General
- Linda Christian as Mara

== Production ==
The film was shot in Mexico by RKO during its collaboration with Churubusco Studios at Acapulco, Teotihuacan and Mexico City. It was the first official Tarzan film to be filmed outside the United States since Herman Brix's The New Adventures of Tarzan. Writing in Turner Classic Movies, Richard Harlan Smith reported that "[s]ets were destroyed by storms, Sol Lesser suffered a heart attack that necessitated his departure from the location, and Weissmuller experienced a case of sunburn which required him to wear make-up for the first time in his career."

The film is noted for its cinematography by Gabriel Figueroa, exotic Mexican scenery and coastal locales, a Dimitri Tiomkin score and much group singing.

== Deaths ==
Two members of the film crew were killed during production. One Mexican crew member was crushed by a motorboat whilst Angel Garcia, a stunt diver who doubled for Tarzan's high dive, was killed after he survived the dive but was swept by the surf into the rocks below the cliff.

== Reception ==
A contemporary review of the film in The New York Times noted that "Purists over the age of 8 viewing this lively caper [...] may wonder about the precise whereabouts of Aquatania, whose citizens seem more Mexican than African, and whose mailman is a singer of gay Calypso songs," that "there's nary a mermaid about," and that "Tarzan, who has not entirely given up swinging through the trees, does cavort quite a bit in the water with Linda Christian, a lass nobly endowed by nature." Variety reported that the film "is standard Johnny Weissmuller," but noted that "Christian [is] comely and has the physical attributes to measure up for the screen" and that the film has "some spectacular camerawork, probably the best on any Tarzan film."

Author and film critic Hal Erickson described the film in AllMovie as a "diverting Tarzan adventure" despite "jungle settings [that] don't look particularly African." Critic Graeme Clark wrote that Weissmuller "seemingly spen[t] half the movie freestyling through the waves, diving off cliffs and venturing to the sea bed where he could get up to such business as battling a giant octopus for no other reason than the plot needed a spot of peril" and "if you could put up with singer John Laurenz as a Boy substitute (many cannot) then the skill of veteran director Robert Florey kept it rattling along."
