= Monique van Vooren =

American actress (1927–2020)

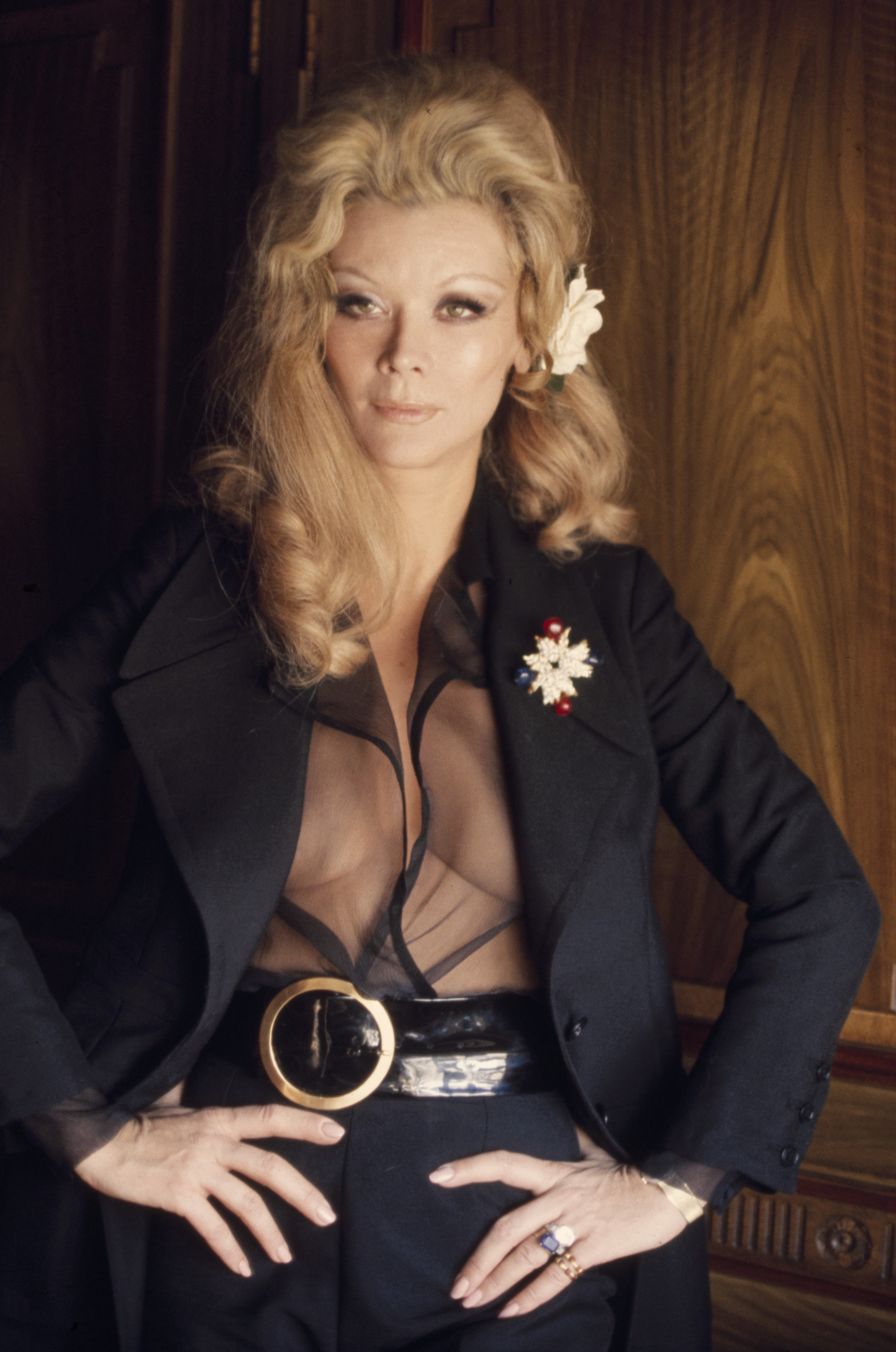
- Van Vooren in 1975
- Born: March 25, 1927; Brussels, Belgium
- Died: January 25, 2020 (aged 92); Manhattan, New York City, U.S.
- Other names: Monique Vooren
- Citizenship: United States
- Occupations: Actress, dancer
- Years active: 1950–2012
- Spouses: Jakobson (details unknown) Kurt Henry Pfenniger (m. 1950-195?; divorced); Gerard Walter Purcell (m. 1958–2002), his death);
- Partner: Orin Lehman (2001–2008; his death)
- Children: 1

Monique van Vooren (March 25, 1927 – January 25, 2020) was a Belgian-American actress, singer, and writer. Her career spanned Broadway, cabaret, film, and television. She appeared in films such as Tarzan and the She-Devil (1953) and Andy Warhol's Frankenstein (1973), and made guest appearances on TV shows including Batman (1968) as the Penguin's associate. Her album, Mink in Hi-Fi, was released in 1958 and her book, Night Sanctuary, was published in 1981. Van Vooren died of cancer at age 92 in Manhattan.

== Early life and education ==
Monique Bronz was born in 1927 Brussels to George Bronz (or Bronze) and Louise van Vooren. She was a champion skater and a beauty queen in Belgium.

Reportedly, she arrived in New York in 1950 on a Fulbright scholarship. She had studied philosophy in Europe before enrolling at New York University. She spoke six languages: English, Italian, French, German, Spanish, and Dutch. "I can also read Greek and Latin," she stated.

== Career ==
=== Theater ===
Van Vooren performed in several Broadway plays including John Murray Anderson's Almanac (1953–54), Destry Rides Again (1960), and Man on the Moon (1975).

In the 1960s, she starred in summer stock theatre productions of Damn Yankees and A Shot in the Dark in the United States.

=== Music ===
In 1958, her debut album Mink in Hi-Fi was released on RCA Victor Records. Backed by Skitch Henderson and his orchestra, it included a blend of English and French songs. She was wearing only diamonds for the album cover, swathed in expensive-looking furs of various colors. According to John S. Wilson's glowing New York Times review, she had been "hiding her real talent under a bushel of cheesecake."

She appeared frequently in cabaret performances. She performed at the Mocambo on the Sunset Strip in West Hollywood in 1957. In 1976, she performed at the Rainbow Grill at Rockefeller Center in New York City.

=== Film and television ===
Her first film role was as a schoolgirl in the 1950 Italian drama Domani È Troppo Tardi (Tomorrow Is Too Late), which starred Vittorio De Sica. She costarred with Lex Barker and Joyce MacKenzie in her second movie, "Tarzan and the She-Devil" (1953), portraying a malevolent ivory poacher. She starred in two French crime dramas in 1955: "Ça Va Barder" (Give ' em Hell) and Série Noire (The Infiltrator).

Her other film credits include the romantic comedy Happy Anniversary (1959), starring David Niven and Mitzi Gaynor; Ash Wednesday (1973), featuring Elizabeth Taylor and Richard Burton; the low-budget erotic revenge drama Sugar Cookies (1973); and Flesh for Frankenstein (1973), also known as Andy Warhol's Frankenstein. In the latter, while her husband is preoccupied with creating monsters, Van Vooren's character, Baroness Frankenstein, becomes romantically involved with the stable boy, played by Warhol superstar Joe Dallesandro.

On television, she had roles in a 1959 NBC adaptation of What Makes Sammy Run? and as Miss Clean on Batman (1968). She also appeared on game shows, including To Tell the Truth and Password.

=== Writing ===
In 1981, Van Vooren's book Night Sanctuary was published, for which she received the highest advance ever that Simon & Schuster's Summit Books paid for a new novelist. She described the book as being about "the dark side of people."

== Death ==
Van Vooren died of cancer in Manhattan on January 25, 2020. She was survived by her son Eric Purcell, and a granddaughter.

== Personal life ==
Van Vooren was a longtime friend of ballet dancer Rudolf Nureyev.

=== Marriages and relationships ===
By 1957, Van Vooren had been married and divorced twice. She married second husband Kurt (or Curt) Henry Pfenniger in 1950; they separated in 1954 and later divorced. Her third husband was New York businessman Gerard Walter "Jerry" Purcell. They were married from 1958 until Purcell died in 2002.

Van Vooren had various young lovers, including actor Hiram Keller. In 2001, Van Vooran began dating Orin Lehman, a longtime New York State parks commissioner, and former fiancé of comedian Joan Rivers. Rivers retorted by making fun of the new couple's advanced ages on Howard Stern's radio show. Van Vooren responded, telling Page Six: "She’s one to talk. She's got more miles on her than an old Checker cab. As for dear Orin, he's been a friend of mine before Rivers came along, while they were together and after he wisely dumped her." They were together until Lehman's death in 2008.

=== Legal issues ===
In 1983, Van Vooren was found guilty of lying before a federal grand jury and "ordered to get psychiatric help and perform 500 hours of community service as part of a suspended sentence." The sentence resulted from an investigation of "whether she had pocketed her dead mother's Social Security payments."

== Filmography ==
- 1950: Tomorrow Is Too Late - Giannina
- 1953: Tarzan and the She-Devil - Lyra, the She-Devil
- 1955: The Infiltrator - Elaine
- 1955: Ça va barder - Irène
- 1957: Producers' Showcase (episode: "Mayerling", TV film released theatrically in Europe)
- 1957: Ten Thousand Bedrooms - Girl on Main Title
- 1958: Gigi - showgirl (uncredited)
- 1959: Sunday Showcase (TV series) - Zizi Molnari
  - "What Makes Sammy Run?: Part 1" (1959)
  - "What Makes Sammy Run?: Part 2" (1959)
- 1959: Happy Anniversary - Jeanette Revere
- 1961: The DuPont Show of the Month (TV series) - Krys
  - "Trick or Treason"
- 1959–1963: The United States Steel Hour (TV series)
  - "A Taste of Champagne" (1959) - Simone Durrell
  - "Southwest Quarter" (1963)
- 1965: The Trials of O'Brien (TV series)
  - "Goodbye and Keep Cool" (1965) - Eve St. Clair
- 1967: Fearless Frank - Plethora
- 1968: Batman (TV series)
  - "Nora Clavicle and the Ladies' Crime Club" (1968) - Miss Clean (uncredited)
  - "Penguin's Clean Sweep" (1968) - Miss Clean
- 1971: The Decameron - Queen of Skulls (as Monique Van Voren)
- 1973: Sugar Cookies - Helene
- 1973: Ash Wednesday - German Woman
- 1973: Andy Warhol's Frankenstein - Baroness Katrin Frankenstein
- 1987: Wall Street - "Woman at '21'"
- 2012: Greystone Park - Monique
