= You're Telling Me =

You're Telling Me may refer to:

- You're Telling Me!, a 1934 American pre-Code comedy film
- You're Telling Me (film), a 1942 American comedy film
