= Tarzan's Magic Fountain =

1949 film by Lee Sholem

- Film poster
- Directed by: Lee Sholem
- Written by: Curt Siodmak; Harry Chandlee
- Based on: Characters created by Edgar Rice Burroughs
- Produced by: Sol Lesser
- Starring: Lex Barker; Brenda Joyce; Albert Dekker; Evelyn Ankers
- Cinematography: Karl Struss
- Edited by: Merril G. White
- Music by: Alexander Laszlo
- Production company: Sol Lesser Productions
- Distributed by: RKO Radio Pictures
- Release date: February 5, 1949 (U.S.)
- Running time: 73 minutes
- Country: United States
- Language: English

Tarzan's Magic Fountain is a 1949 Tarzan film directed by Lee Sholem and starring Lex Barker as Tarzan and Brenda Joyce as his companion Jane. The thirteenth film of the Tarzan film series that began with 1932's Tarzan the Ape Man, the film also features Albert Dekker and Evelyn Ankers. It was co-written by Curt Siodmak.

This was Barker's first appearance as Edgar Rice Burroughs' ape-man, while Joyce had played Jane opposite Johnny Weissmuller as Tarzan in four previous films. She was one of only two actresses to portray Jane in movies with two different actors as Tarzan. (The other was Karla Schramm in the silent era.) Tarzan's Magic Fountain was Joyce's final turn in the role, and different actresses played Jane in each of Barker's four subsequent Tarzan movies: (Vanessa Brown, Virginia Huston, Dorothy Hart, and Joyce MacKenzie). Elmo Lincoln, who had been the first screen Tarzan three decades earlier, appears uncredited as a fisherman repairing his nets. The film was followed by Tarzan and the Slave Girl in 1950.

== Plot ==
Aviator Gloria James Jessup went missing twenty years ago. Tarzan and Jane hear news of a man back in the United States who is about to be sentenced to life imprisonment; the only way he can be cleared is for Jessup's testimony. Tarzan secretly leaves for the hidden valley where Jessup has secretly been living for almost two decades and brings her back to testify.

Jessup looks decades younger than her actual age and this prompts a pair of men to ponder the rumor of a magic Fountain of Youth and try to find it after she returns from testifying and heads back there.

== Cast ==
- Lex Barker as Tarzan
- Brenda Joyce as Jane
- Albert Dekker as Mr. Trask
- Evelyn Ankers as Gloria James Jessup
- Charles Drake as Mr. Dodd
- Alan Napier as Douglas Jessup
- Ted Hecht as Pasco
- Henry Brandon as Siko
- Elmo Lincoln as a Fisherman
- Henry Kulky a Vredak
- Rory Mallinson as Vredak's Companion
- Rick Vallin as the Flaming Arrow Shooter

== Critical reception ==
The New York Times welcomed Lex Barker's new Tarzan as "A younger, more streamlined apeman with a personable grin and a torso guaranteed to make any lion cringe, he seems to be just what the witch-doctor ordered for this tattered series. The picture, though, is a matter of stale peanuts at the same old jungle stand. Instead of resorting to new ideas and treatment and a timely overhauling job, the studio has dragged out a mouldy script, the same sheepish-looking extras, and the wheezing chimpanzee, Cheetah, who isn't getting any younger, either."
