= Gay Blades =

1946 film by George Blair

- Theatrical release poster
- Directed by: George Blair
- Screenplay by: Albert Beich; Marcy Klauber
- Produced by: George Blair
- Starring: Allan Lane; Jean Rogers; Edward Ashley; Frank Albertson; Ann Gillis; Robert Armstrong
- Cinematography: William Bradford
- Edited by: Tony Martinelli
- Music by: R. Dale Butts
- Production company: Republic Pictures
- Distributed by: Republic Pictures
- Release date: January 25, 1946
- Running time: 67 minutes
- Country: United States
- Language: English

Gay Blades is a 1946 American comedy film directed by George Blair and written by Albert Beich and Marcy Klauber. The film stars Allan Lane, Jean Rogers, Edward Ashley, Frank Albertson, Ann Gillis and Robert Armstrong. The film was released on January 25, 1946, by Republic Pictures.

== Plot ==
Hollywood talent scout Nancy Davis is told by her boss, J.M. Snively, to go find an unknown to become a new hero and star in "The Behemoth," his next big production. Nancy is just about out of ideas when she finds herself in Duluth, Minnesota impressed by the Rustlers' hockey star, Andy Buell.

They discuss the idea at a party at the home of Helen Dowell and her husband, Frankie, who is Andy's friend and teammate on the ice. Andy actually wants to become an architect when he is finished with hockey. He is coaxed into giving Snively's movie a try, but is attracted to Nancy, becomes distracted, his play suffers and the Rustlers begin losing, causing Andy to be jeered by the team's fans.

Things continue to go wrong. Andy loses his future job with the architectural firm. His temper flares, he gets drunk and jailed, then takes out his aggression on the ice, where Frankie is seriously hurt. Snively hears the crowd boo and rescinds the offer and fires Nancy on the spot. Before the next game, Andy gives a blood transfusion to Frankie at the hospital. He shows up in the third period, leads the Rustlers to victory and is able to get his architect job back after all.

== Cast ==
- Allan Lane as Andy Buell
- Jean Rogers as Nancy Davis
- Edward Ashley as Ted Brinker
- Frank Albertson as Frankie Dowell
- Ann Gillis as Helen Dowell
- Robert Armstrong as McManus
- Paul Harvey as J.M. Snively
- Ray Walker as Bill Calhoun
- Jonathan Hale as Whittlesey
- Russell Hicks as Buxton
- Emmett Vogan as Doctor
- Edward Gargan as Bartender
- Nedrick Young as Gary Lester

== See also ==
- List of films about ice hockey
