= Deadline – U.S.A. =

1952 film by Richard Brooks

- Theatrical poster
- Directed by: Richard Brooks
- Written by: Richard Brooks
- Produced by: Sol C. Siegel
- Starring: Humphrey Bogart; Ethel Barrymore; Kim Hunter; Ed Begley; Warren Stevens; Paul Stewart; Martin Gabel; Joseph De Santis; Joyce MacKenzie; Audrey Christie; Fay Baker; Jim Backus
- Cinematography: Milton R. Krasner
- Edited by: William B. Murphy
- Music by: Cyril J. Mockridge
- Color process: Black and white
- Production company: Twentieth Century-Fox
- Distributed by: Twentieth Century-Fox
- Release date: March 14, 1952 (New York)
- Running time: 87 minutes
- Country: United States
- Language: English
- Box office: $1.25 million (U.S. rentals)

Deadline – U.S.A. is a 1952 American crime film written and directed by Richard Brooks and starring Humphrey Bogart, Ethel Barrymore and Kim Hunter.

== Plot ==
Ed Hutcheson is the crusading managing editor of The Day, a large metropolitan newspaper. He is steadfastly loyal to publisher Margaret Garrison, the widow of the paper's founder John, but Garrison is soon to sell the newspaper to interests who plan to cease operations.

Hutcheson assigns his reporters to the murder of a young woman named Bessie Smith and the involvement of racketeer Tomas Rienzi, which could turn out to be a circulation builder that keeps the paper in business. Reporters discover that Bessie had been Rienzi's mistress and that her brother Herman had conducted illegal business with Rienzi. Hutcheson provides Herman with an opportunity to safely tell his story, but Rienzi's thugs, disguised as cops, kidnap and kill Herman.

Garrison's daughters, majority stockholders Kitty and Alice, wish to sell The Day, but Garrison defiantly refuses, supported by Hutcheson. However, a judge permits the sale to proceed. Bessie's elderly mother Mrs. Schmidt appears in Hutcheson's office with her daughter's diary and $200,000 in cash, implicating Rienzi in his illegal activities. The presses roll as Hutcheson ignores Rienzi's threats.

== Cast ==
- Humphrey Bogart as Ed Hutcheson
- Ethel Barrymore as Margaret Garrison
- Kim Hunter as Nora Hutcheson
- Ed Begley as Frank Allen
- Warren Stevens as George Burrows
- Paul Stewart as Harry Thompson
- Martin Gabel as Tomas Rienzi
- Joseph De Santis as Herman Schmidt
- Joyce MacKenzie as Katherine "Kitty" Garrison Geary
- Audrey Christie as Mrs. Willebrandt
- Fay Baker as Alice Garrison Courtney
- Jim Backus as Jim Cleary

== Production ==
The story is based on the 1931 demise of the New York World newspaper, including the decision by the sons of Joseph Pulitzer to sell the paper rather than operate it themselves.

== Reception ==
In a contemporary review for The New York Times, critic Bosley Crowther called the film an "entangled melodrama" and wrote:

Mr. Bogart makes a striking picture of an outraged and unrelenting man who fights on all fronts for his associates and for the perpetuation of an institution in which he believes. It may be the complications Mr. Brooks has contrived for him are a little too snarled for easy following and unqualified belief. After all, it is asking a good bit of an audience to keep straight in mind three separate lines of development of interrelated plots, let alone allow the likelihood of the coincidence of all of them. ... But it has to be said for Mr. Bogart and for the writing and the direction of Mr. Brooks that, in spite of the melodramatic turmoil, they have brought forth a pretty straight m. e. [managing editor]. Really good newspaper pictures are few and far between. This one, while melodramatic, does all right by the trade.

== Home media ==
The film was released on DVD and Blu-ray was in 2016. In the audio commentary, film historian Eddie Muller rates the film as one of the greatest ever made about the inner workings of a major newspaper.
