= Stagecoach to Fury =

1956 film by William F. Claxton

- Film poster
- Directed by: William F. Claxton
- Screenplay by: Eric Norden
- Story by: Earle Lyon; Eric Norden
- Produced by: Earle Lyon
- Starring: Forrest Tucker; Mari Blanchard; Wallace Ford
- Cinematography: Walter Strenge
- Edited by: Carl Pierson
- Music by: Paul Dunlap
- Color process: Black and white
- Production company: Regal Films
- Distributed by: 20th Century-Fox
- Release date: December 13, 1956
- Running time: 76 minutes
- Country: United States
- Language: English
- Budget: $125,000
- Box office: $600,000 (estimated)

Stagecoach to Fury is a 1956 American Western film directed by William F. Claxton and starring Forrest Tucker and Mari Blanchard. It was the first film from Robert L. Lippert's Regal Films; the B picture unit of 20th Century Fox set up to provide second features shot in CinemaScope.

The film, with exteriors shot around Kanab, Utah was nominated for an Academy Award for black-and-white cinematography for the 29th Academy Awards.

Others in the film include Wallace Ford as Judge Lester Farrell, Ellen Corby as Sarah Farrell, Wright King as Ralph Slader, Paul Fix as Tim O'Connors, and Rodolfo Hoyos Jr., as Lorenzo Gracia.

== Plot ==
A stagecoach with a mixed group of passenger en route to the town of Fury makes a stop at a layover. Upon arrival the passengers are held up. Lorenzo Garcia and his gang of bandidos capture and disarm the passengers, shooting one when he lowers his hands to stop his falling trousers. The two staff of the coaching stop are missing and presumed murdered. Garcia questions former Army captain Frank Townsend, now riding shotgun on the stagecoach, about the location of the shipment of Federal Government gold they expected to be on the stagecoach. After Garcia shoots and wounds Tim O'Connor, the stagecoach driver, to encourage Townsend to give him the information, Townsend reveals that the stagecoach was to remain at the layover until a wagon containing the gold shipment would arrive and transfer the cargo to the stage.

Garcia holds the prisoners as his band awaits the gold shipment. Among the surviving passengers are young gunslinger Ralph Slader, who the bandidos are eager to goad into a gunfight, a cowardly judge escaping the vengeance of criminals, a scheming woman who has arranged to rob and murder her husband, and Townsend's fiancée. (We learn the characters back stories through flashbacks.) Though Garcia explains the passengers will remain safe if they follow his orders, Townsend feels that Garcia would not want any witnesses to his robbery to be left alive. He plots with the judge to overpower the men guarding them so they can warn the wagon with the gold through gunfire. When Garcia and his men ride off to intercept the gold, Townsend and the judge succeed in capturing their guards, they warn the gold wagon, and Townsend rides off to stop Garcia from getting the gold. As Garcia and his men wage a gun battle with the men on the gold wagon, Townsend arrives and begins picking off Garcia's men from a nearby mountain. Eventually only Garcia is left, and Townsend kills him in a duel on horseback.

== Cast ==
- Forrest Tucker as Frank Townsend
- Mari Blanchard as Barbara Duval
- Wallace Ford as Judge Lester Farrell
- Rodolfo Hoyos Jr. as Lorenzo Gracia
- Paul Fix as Tim O'Connors
- Rico Alaniz as Miguel Torres
- Wright King as Ralph Slader
- Margia Dean as Ruth
- Ian MacDonald as Sheriff Ross
- William 'Bill' Phillips as Harold, the Bartender
- Ellen Corby as Sarah Farrell
- Alex Montoya as Oro
- Rayford Barnes as Zick
- Norman Leavitt as Customer
- Steven Geray as Nichols
- Leslie Banning as An Stewart
- Paul Fierro as Pedro
- Robert Karnes as Talbot

== Production ==
Parts of the film were shot in the Gap in Utah.

== Reception ==
The film grossed $250,000 in its first five months and Variety estimated it to earn $600,000.

== Quotes ==
"Justice sometimes moves in strange company. Its judgement is not always empty. Though its sting be cruel."

== See also ==
- List of American films of 1956
