= The Cruel Tower =

- Theatrical release poster
- Directed by: Lew Landers
- Screenplay by: Warren Douglas
- Based on: The Cruel Tower by William Brown Hartley
- Produced by: Lindsley Parsons
- Starring: John Ericson; Mari Blanchard; Charles McGraw; Steve Brodie; Peter Whitney; Alan Hale Jr.
- Cinematography: Ernest Haller
- Edited by: Maurice Wright
- Music by: Paul Dunlap
- Production company: Lindsley Parsons Picture Corporation
- Distributed by: Allied Artists Pictures
- Release date: October 28, 1956
- Running time: 79 minutes
- Country: United States
- Language: English

The Cruel Tower is a 1956 American adventure film directed by Lew Landers and written by Warren Douglas. It is based on the 1955 novel The Cruel Tower by William Brown Hartley. The film stars John Ericson, Mari Blanchard, Charles McGraw, Steve Brodie, Peter Whitney and Alan Hale Jr. The film was released on October 28, 1956, by Allied Artists Pictures.

== Cast ==
- John Ericson as Tom Kittredge
- Mari Blanchard as Mary 'The Babe' Thompson
- Charles McGraw as Harry 'Stretch' Clay
- Steve Brodie as Casey
- Peter Whitney as 'Joss' Jossman
- Alan Hale Jr. as Rocky Milliken
- Diana Darrin as Kit
- Carol Kelly as Waitress
- Barbara Bell Wright as Rev. Claver
