= Machete (1958 film) =

1958 film by Kurt Neumann

- Theatrical release poster
- Directed by: Kurt Neumann
- Written by: Kurt Neumann; Carroll Young
- Produced by: Kurt Neumann
- Starring: Mari Blanchard; Ruth Cains; Albert Dekker; Juano Hernandez; Carlos Rivas; Lee Van Cleef
- Cinematography: Karl Struss
- Edited by: Jodie Copelan
- Music by: Paul Sawtell; Bert Shefter
- Production company: J. Harold Odell Productions
- Distributed by: United Artists
- Release date: December 1958
- Running time: 75 minutes
- Country: United States
- Language: English

Machete is a 1958 American drama film directed by Kurt Neumann and written by Kurt Neumann and Carroll Young. The film stars Mari Blanchard, Ruth Cains, Albert Dekker, Juano Hernandez, Carlos Rivas and Lee Van Cleef. The film was released in December 1958 by United Artists.

== Plot ==
Sugar plantation owner Don Luis Montoya gets married in New York and brings his bride Jean back to Puerto Rico, unaware that she wed him only for his money. Friends at their San Juan honeymoon hotel recognize her as a notorious party girl, so Jean urges her husband to take her home right away, before the marriage has even been consummated.

At the plantation, Jean's arrival is met with mistrust by Luis' longtime protege, Carlos, and by his cousin, Miguel, who help run the business. A drunken Miguel insults her and is slapped by Carlos. In vengeance, he attacks Carlos later with a machete.

Luis orders him to leave, but Miguel sabotages the cane-cutting machinery and is asked back by Luis to repair it. Jean, meantime, has fallen in love with Carlos, which results in Miguel planting seeds of suspicion with Luis against them. Catching the two in a compromising position, Luis chastises Carlos and later takes his new wife forcibly.

Miguel sets fire to the sugar field. Luis, believing that Jean is running off with Carlos, comes after them with his machete and is about to die in the blaze when Carlos comes to rescue him. Miguel is killed with the machete, and Jean dies during the ordeal as well.

== Cast ==
- Mari Blanchard as Jean Montoya
- Ruth Cains as Rita
- Albert Dekker as Don Luis Montoya
- Juano Hernandez as Bernardo
- Carlos Rivas as Carlos
- Lee Van Cleef as Miguel
