= The Secret of the Black Falcon =

1961 film

- Directed by: Domenico Paolella
- Written by: Domenico Paolella; Sergio Sollima
- Produced by: Fortunato Misiano
- Starring: Lex Barker
- Cinematography: Carlo Bellero
- Edited by: Jolanda Benvenuti
- Music by: Gino Filippini
- Production company: Romana Film
- Release date: 1961
- Language: Italian

The Secret of the Black Falcon (Italian: Il segreto dello sparviero nero) is a 1961 Italian swashbuckler film co-written and directed by Domenico Paolella and starring Lex Barker and Livio Lorenzon.

== Cast ==
- Lex Barker as Captain Don Carlos de Herrera
- Livio Lorenzon as Sergeant Rodriguez
- Nadia Marlowa as Leonora
- Germano Longo as Cat's Paw
- Walter Barnes as John Rackham
- Pina Cornel as Yvette
- Loris Gizzi as Don Pedro Ordigaso
- Dina De Santis as Ines
- Tullio Altamura as Don Juan
- Gino Buzzanca as Gouvernator of Melida
- Ignazio Balsamo as Sancho
- Corrado Annicelli as Don Alvaro Fontejuna
