= Storm Over Ceylon =

1963 film

- Directed by: Gerd Oswald; Giovanni Roccardi
- Written by: Ludwig Bruckmann; Arnaldo Marrosu; Fabrizio Taglioni; Leopoldo Trieste
- Produced by: Enrico Bomba; Wolf C. Hartwig
- Starring: Lex Barker; Ann Smyrner; Magali Noël
- Cinematography: Bitto Albertini; Ugo Peruzzi
- Edited by: Anni Lautenbacher; Eva Maria Tittes
- Music by: Francesco De Masi
- Production companies: Paris-Europa Productions; Rapid Film
- Distributed by: Gloria Film
- Release date: 31 May 1963
- Running time: 82 minutes
- Countries: West Germany; Italy; France
- Language: German

Storm Over Ceylon (German: Das Todesauge von Ceylon, Italian: Tempesta su Ceylon) is a 1963 adventure film directed by Gerd Oswald and Giovanni Roccardi and starring Lex Barker, Ann Smyrner and Magali Noël. It was made as a co-production between West Germany, Italy and France.

It was shot at the Cinecitta Studios in Rome and on location in Sri Lanka.

== Cast ==
- Lex Barker as Larry Stone
- Ann Smyrner as Helga Ferlach
- Magali Noël as Gaby
- Eleonora Rossi Drago as Maharani from Tungala
- Maurice Ronet as Dr. Gérard Rinaldi
- Franco Fabrizi as Manuel Da Costa
- Hans Nielsen as Professor Ferlach
- Peter Carsten as Hermann

== Bibliography ==
- Ivo Ritzer & Harald Steinwender. Transnationale Medienlandschaften: Populärer Film zwischen World Cinema und postkolonialem Europa. Springer-Verlag, 2016.
