= Nocturne (1946 film) =

1946 black-and-white film noir directed by Edwin L. Marin

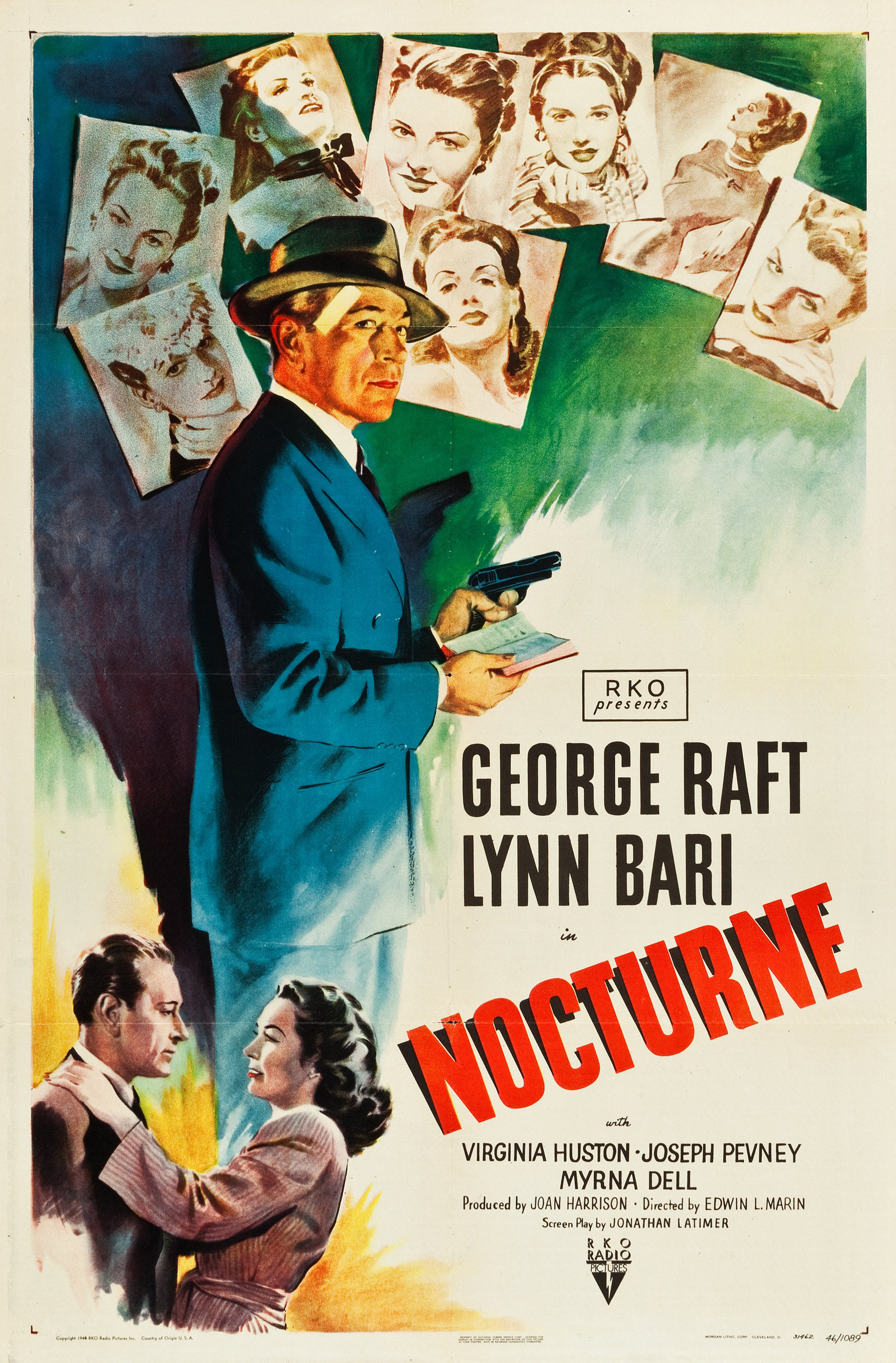
- Theatrical release poster by William Rose
- Directed by: Edwin L. Marin
- Screenplay by: Jonathan Latimer
- Story by: Roland Brown; Frank Fenton
- Produced by: Joan Harrison; Jack J. Gross (executive producer)
- Starring: George Raft; Lynn Bari; Virginia Huston; Joseph Pevney
- Cinematography: Harry J. Wild
- Edited by: Elmo Williams
- Music by: Leigh Harline
- Production company: RKO Radio Pictures
- Distributed by: RKO Radio Pictures
- Release date: October 29, 1946 (United States)
- Running time: 87 minutes
- Country: United States
- Language: English

Nocturne is a 1946 American film noir starring George Raft and Lynn Bari, with Virginia Huston, Joseph Pevney, and Myrna Dell in support. Directed by Edwin L. Marin, the film was produced by longtime Alfred Hitchcock associate Joan Harrison, scripted by Jonathan Latimer, and released by RKO Pictures. It was one of several medium budget thrillers Raft made in the late 1940s.

== Plot ==
Keith Vincent is a Hollywood composer, working on a new song. As he nears completion of "Nocturne", a woman sits silently in the shadows and listens to him over his piano. The mood changes when he speaks the lyrics, "You're no longer the one," then encourages her to go away for a while. Moments later, as he alters the score, a shot rings out.

When the police arrive the lieutenant in charge thinks it is suicide, but detective Joe Warne suspects murder. He encounters Vincent's housekeeper, Susan, whom he recognizes as an ex-con. They take her in for questioning.

The score on the piano is dedicated to "Dolores". Warne begins his search for her. The houseboy arrives after a day off. He explains that Vincent was planning to meet a woman but he does not know whom. He describes the composer as a womanizer who called all of his girlfriends Dolores. Warne notices a single portrait is missing from a line of Vincent's former flings.

The coroner returns a verdict of suicide, but Warne continues to investigate despite being warned by his boss to stop. He recognizes that he is being followed by a large man and accosts him. The man, Torp, denies everything. Warne pushes another large man into a pool when the interloper seeks to cut an interview short with one of Vincent's exes.

Warne's aggressive tactics lead several suspects to report him for abuse. Obsessed with the case, and ignoring his chief's direct warnings, Warne is threatened with suspension from the force. Indignant, he turns in his badge.

As he digs deeper into the case, the clues draw him closer to ex-Vincent flame and bit actress Frances Ransom. She is difficult, evasive, uncooperative, and arranges a beating for him by Torp.

While Warne is being patched up by a doctor a severely battered Susan is brought in on a gurney. She refuses to reveal who shut her up.

Acting on a tip, the police are put on Warne's tail. He ends up framed for the murder of a photographer who attempts to provide him an important clue to the identity of Vincent's last girlfriend. She is Carol, Frances' sister, the singer at a local nightclub where Torp works pushing pianist accompanist Ned "Fingers" Ford from table to table.

Suspecting Frances is somehow involved, Warne goes to her apartment and discovers it is locked with the gas turned on. He breaks in and saves her, pocketing a purported suicide note left in the typewriter.

When Warne puts the bite on Carol she professes innocence, but he sees through it. He turns his attention to Ford, a composer who had once collaborated with Vincent on several successful songs but had been cut out when Vincent refused to share the recognition - and the rewards.

Ford is also Carol's husband, the couple having been married several years earlier. Ford knew that his wife had become Vincent's latest conquest, and decided to murder him when he discovered the cad had no intention of marrying her. He also had been responsible, with Torp's help, for the photographer's murder, staged as another suicide, and the attempted murder of Frances.

Warne turns Ford and Carol over to the police, and takes Frances by the arm to introduce her to his mother, a first step towards getting her to the altar. She smilingly goes along.

== Cast ==
- George Raft as Joe Warne
- Lynn Bari as Frances Ransom
- Virginia Huston as Carol Page
- Joseph Pevney as Ned "Fingers" Ford
- Myrna Dell as Susan Flanders
- Edward Ashley as Keith Vincent
- Walter Sande as Police Lt. Halberson
- Mabel Paige as Mrs. Warne
- Bern Hoffman as Erik Torp
- Queenie Smith as Queenie

== Production ==
George Raft and Edward Marin had just made Johnny Angel together at RKO, which proved popular. Their involvement in Nocturne was announced in September 1945. In between Johnny Angel and Nocturne, Raft and Marin made Mr. Ace for Benedict Bogeaus.

Joan Harrison was signed by RKO to produce the film in October.

Joseph Pevney was brought out from Broadway to play a supporting role. Jane Greer was up for the female lead but George Raft went for the more age-appropriate and better-known Lynn Bari. Bari was borrowed from 20th Century Fox. Filming started in May 1946.

Raft reportedly did some rewriting of the script to make his character more sympathetic.

== Reception ==
=== Box office ===
The film was popular on release and recorded a profit of $568,000.

=== Critical reception ===
When the film was released, the staff at Variety magazine wrote, "Nocturne is a detective thriller with action and suspense plentiful and hard-bitten mood of story sustained by Edwin L. Marin's direction."

The New York Times sniffed, "moments of suspense and excitement in this hour-and-a-half manhunt are rare".

The Los Angeles Times called it "a skillfully worked out murder melodrama."
