= Rails Into Laramie =

1954 film by Jesse Hibbs

- Film poster by Reynold Brown
- Directed by: Jesse Hibbs
- Screenplay by: D.D. Beauchamp; Joseph Hoffman
- Produced by: Ted Richmond
- Starring: John Payne; Mari Blanchard; Dan Duryea; Joyce MacKenzie; Barton MacLane
- Cinematography: Maury Gertsman
- Edited by: Ted J. Kent
- Music by: Henry Mancini; Milton Rosen; Herman Stein
- Color process: Technicolor
- Production company: Universal-International Pictures
- Distributed by: Universal-International Pictures
- Release date: April 14, 1954
- Running time: 81 minutes
- Country: United States
- Language: English
- Box office: $1 million

Rails Into Laramie is a 1954 American Technicolor Western film directed by Jesse Hibbs and written by D.D. Beauchamp and Joseph Hoffman. The film stars John Payne, Mari Blanchard, Dan Duryea, Joyce Mackenzie, Barton MacLane and Ralph Dumke. The film was released on April 14, 1954, by Universal-International Pictures.

== Plot ==
In the Wyoming Territory during 1869, Union Army Sgt. Jefferson Harder enters a casino and, within minutes, instigates a brawl. Just as he is thrown through the window, the soldiers sent by Gen. Augur to bring Jeff back to the fort arrive. Back at the fort, Argur explains to the hot-headed officer that the construction of the cross-country railroad has been halted outside Laramie by Jim Shanessy, who runs the town and wants the crew to stay and spend their money at his hotel and casino. It is only the threat of the blockade that convinces Jeff to take the assignment. He is further annoyed when his arrival in Laramie is met with dismay from the chief railroad engineer, Lee Graham, Judge Pierce and Mayor Frank Logan, who expected him to bring troops.

Graham, Pierce and Logan grow more aghast when Jeff warmly greets Shanessy, his childhood friend. Jeff is at first pleased when Shanessy offers him free board at the hotel, but when the businessman's henchmen, brothers Con and Ace Winton, deliver a two-thousand dollar gift, Jeff recognizes it as a bribe. In the lobby, Jeff agrees to meet later that night with Pierce, who is still suspicious of him, and then visits the ineffectual but good-hearted marshal, Orrie Sommers, and advises him to ready the jail cells.

At the casino soon after, Shanessy introduces Jeff to his partner, beautiful Lou Carter, but Jeff spurns Lou's advances and returns the money to Shanessy. Shanessy, who remains friendly even after Ace threatens Jeff and is beaten up in return, invites Jeff to his home, hoping that Jeff's lingering feelings for Shanessy's wife Helen will keep him from pursuing his new duties. Later, Jeff meets with Graham, Pierce and Logan, and then, armed with their promise of complete authority, visits the railroad work site, where the men are drinking, gambling and sleeping. After Jeff knocks out the brawny foreman, the other men back away, allowing him to shut down the makeshift saloon. The next day, however, when Jeff posts notices that all the men have been fired and construction suspended, both the workers and the town merchants complain bitterly.

Graham calls a council meeting, at which some merchants demand Jeff's court-martial but, after he explains that he can rid the town of gambling and alcohol and only those who want to work will remain, they agree to give his plan a two-week trial. Shanessy counters by refusing to grant workers credit, and when they gather into an angry mob, as he has planned, he easily convinces them to wreak havoc on the town and defeat Jeff's plan. Jeff, however, arrests Shanessy, and that night, Lou invites Jeff to her room and, explaining that no local jury will convict Shanessy, offers to help. A mistrustful Jeff kisses her but then leaves. At the jail, Shanessy talks Jeff into visiting Helen, and when Jeff later leaves her house, too attracted to her to stay, he is beaten and deposited into a railroad car by Shanessy's men. In the morning, Jeff's absence results in a mistrial. Shanessy then instructs the workers to burn down all the railroad camps, after which every arrest Jeff makes is dismissed by crooked juries. He then sends for backup troops, but Shanessy shuts down the telegraph and, anticipating that Jeff will travel to see Augur himself, creates a landslide that blocks all traffic.

Graham, Pierce and Logan insist that Jeff rehire the workers, and when he refuses, they send Orrie on horseback to Cheyenne to order Jeff court-martialed. Soon after, Jeff discovers that Orrie has been killed on the trail, and Lou informs him that Shanessy is the culprit, but the only way to convict him is to construct a jury out of the Wyoming women who have just been granted the right to vote. Still skeptical, Jeff visits Shanessy, and when Ace pulls out a gun, Jeff shoots him and arrests Shanessy again. This time, Lou sits as foreperson on the female jury, and, to Shanessy's shock, they find him guilty. Jeff thanks Lou afterward, and although she first spurns him, he grabs her and she falls into his arms.

The night before Shanessy's scheduled hanging, Helen slips him a gun, and with it he knocks out Jeff and races to Lou's, shooting her in the back. Jeff revives and gathers a posse while Shanessy commandeers a train to Cheyenne, not realizing that the landslide has just been cleared on the tracks, and a passenger train is headed straight toward him. Jeff rides to Shanessy's train, leaps on and shoots his way to the front. There, with the passenger train fast approaching, he knocks out Shanessy and reverses the train only moments before a collision. Weeks later, railroad construction has resumed, and Jeff reports to a recovering Lou that although he must return to the Army for six months, he will consider Laramie his home base.

== Cast ==
- John Payne as Jefferson Harder
- Mari Blanchard as Lou Carter
- Dan Duryea as Jim Shanessy
- Joyce MacKenzie as Helen Shanessy
- Barton MacLane as Lee Graham
- Ralph Dumke as Mayor Frank Logan
- Harry Shannon as Judge Pierce
- James Griffith as Marshal Orrie Sommers
- Lee Van Cleef as Ace Winton
- Myron Healey as Con Winton
- Charles Horvath as Pike Murphy
- George Chandler as Grimes
- Douglas Kennedy as Telegraph Operator
- Alexander Campbell as Higby
