= Jungle Heat =

1957 American film by Howard W. Koch

- Theatrical release poster
- Directed by: Howard W. Koch
- Written by: Jameson Brewer
- Produced by: Aubrey Schenck
- Starring: Lex Barker; Mari Blanchard; James Westerfield; Glenn Langan; Miyoko Sasaki
- Cinematography: William Margulies
- Edited by: John A. Bushelman
- Music by: Les Baxter
- Production company: Bel-Air Productions
- Distributed by: United Artists
- Release date: July 22, 1957
- Running time: 75 minutes
- Country: United States
- Language: English

Jungle Heat is a 1957 American adventure film directed by Howard W. Koch and written by Jameson Brewer. The film stars Lex Barker, Mari Blanchard, James Westerfield, Glenn Langan and Miyoko Sasaki. The film was released on July 22, 1957, by United Artists. The film was shot on Kauaʻi, Hawaii back to back with Voodoo Island.

== Plot ==
Prior to the attack on Pearl Harbor, Japanese infiltrators attempt to turn Hawaiian labourers against American plantation owners.

== Cast ==
- Lex Barker as Dr. Jim Ransom
- Mari Blanchard as Ann McRae
- James Westerfield as Harvey Mathews
- Glenn Langan as Roger McRae
- Miyoko Sasaki as Kimi-San Grey
- Rhodes Reason as Major Richard 'Dick' Grey
- Glenn Dixon as Felix Agung
- Bob Okazaki as Kuji
- Jerry Frank as Corporal
