= The Yellow Mountain =

1954 film

- Theatrical release poster
- Directed by: Jesse Hibbs
- Written by: Robert Blees (adaptation)
- Screenplay by: George Zuckerman; Russell S. Hughes
- Based on: Nevada Gold; 1938 Blue Book (magazine) by Harold Channing Wire
- Produced by: Ross Hunter
- Starring: Lex Barker; Mala Powers; Howard Duff
- Cinematography: George Robinson
- Edited by: Edward Curtiss
- Color process: Technicolor
- Production company: Universal Pictures
- Distributed by: Universal Pictures
- Release date: November 16, 1954
- Running time: 78 minutes
- Country: United States
- Language: English

The Yellow Mountain is a 1954 American Western film directed by Jesse Hibbs and starring Lex Barker, Mala Powers and Howard Duff.

== Plot ==
Two former partners ("Andy Martin" and "Pete Menlo") from a previous mining claim are working in the strike town of "Goldfield", one running a saloon/ casino/ brothel (the "Fandango") and the other providing mining advice and management for the claims that the casino takes in as security against player's stakes. A regular gambler is "Jackpot" (whose daughter, Nevada, is the films love interest and the town's ore assayer).

Buying up a mine stake, the partners make a rich strike. But their miners are taken away by a better pay offer from the town's other main mining magnate, "Bannon". A confrontation in the street with one of the hired guns escalates tension and sparks a price war. But neither mine can keep the loyalty of mule drivers to transport the ore to the smelter to turn into cash and continue the price war. The partners plan to ship a load out of town, but are betrayed by their lawyer to Bannon. (Continuity error - far too large a couple of ore wagons for the number of horses towing it.) The wagons are bushwhacked by Bannon's men outside town and crash. Martin is left unconscious to die in the desert, but is found by a passer-by and taken back into town.

As Martin is returning to town, there is a cave-in at the mine with three men trapped. While the men work to free the trapped men, Menlo and Bannon discuss an offer from a state-wide magnate to run a railway to the town and the smelter, in return for a 50% stake in the town's mines. Martin arrives and incorrectly detects a double cross (financial and romantic) where there was none, and dissolves the partnership and the romance.

Martin and Jackpot meet in a casino, and Martin wins Jackpot's mine, but by an obscure mining law it turns out that the rights to the mines are all controlled by the owner of Jackpot's mine (now Martin). The lawyer is run out of town. Menlo attempts to buy the mine from Jackpot, and discovers that it now belongs to Martin, so attempts to buy it back via Jackpot. This alerts Martin that Menlo is up to something. He is then attacked again by Bannon's hoodlums and dragged to a meeting with Bannon, who also tries to buy the mine. Martin, Nevada and Jackpot figure that something is up, work the mine, find high-quality ore that will control the whole area's strikes but are observed by one of the hoodlums.

Bannon wants to kill the prospectors, but Menlo argues against it. After a fight, Menlo is knocked unconscious and Bannon and his hoodlums head to the claims registration office to prevent the prospectors party from registering the claim. A gunfight ensues, in which the hoodlums are killed, and Menlo reappears just in time to prevent Bannon from killing Jackpot. All ends in sweetness and light, with a fight scene between the two original partners which throws back (or forward) to "Gilligan's Island".

== Cast ==
- Lex Barker as Andy Martin
- Mala Powers as Nevada Wray
- Howard Duff as Pete Menlo
- William Demarest as Jackpot Wray
- John McIntire as Bannon (as John Mc. Intyre)
- Leo Gordon as Drake
- Dayton Lummis as Geraghty
- Hal K. Dawson as Sam Torrence
- William Fawcett as Old Prospector
- James Parnell as Joe
