= Tarzan's Peril =

1951 film by Byron Haskin

- Theatrical poster
- Directed by: Byron Haskin
- Based on: Characters created by Edgar Rice Burroughs
- Produced by: Sol Lesser
- Starring: Lex Barker; Virginia Huston; Dorothy Dandridge
- Cinematography: Karl Struss
- Edited by: Jack Murray
- Music by: Michel Michelet
- Distributed by: RKO Pictures
- Release date: March 10, 1951
- Running time: 78 minutes
- Country: United States
- Language: English

Tarzan's Peril (also known as Jungle Queen and Tarzan and the Jungle Queen) is a 1951 film directed by Byron Haskin and starring Lex Barker, Virginia Huston and Dorothy Dandridge. The film is the 15th in the Tarzan film series that began with 1932's Tarzan the Ape Man. Portions of the film were shot in Kenya, making it the first Tarzan film to be filmed in Africa, although the majority of its location shooting occurred in the United States.

== Plot ==
District Commissioner Peters delays his retirement when confronted with Radijeck, an escaped criminal resuming his gunrunning on behalf on an unnamed foreign power. When Peters and his replacement Connors discover the gunrunning, Radijeck murders the two men. Radijeck sells the weapons to King Bulam who arms his men to avenge himself against Melmendi, queen of a rival tribe, who spurns his offer of marriage. With Melmendi and her people held captive, only Tarzan can stop Radijeck.

== Cast ==
- Lex Barker as Tarzan
- Virginia Huston as Jane
- George Macready as Radijeck
- Douglas Fowley as Herbert Trask
- Glenn Anders as Andrews
- Alan Napier as Commissioner Peters
- Edward Ashley as Conners
- Dorothy Dandridge as Melmendi, Queen of the Ashuba
- Walter Kingsford as Barney
- Frederick O'Neal as King Bulam

== Reception ==
A contemporary review of the film in Variety reported that it "has the familiar ingredients of jungle adventure, plus good background footage actually lensed in Africa" and that "Lex Barker is a capable hero in his Tarzan character. Script could have made him even more of a superman, but otherwise does not let down the fans of the Edgar Rice Burroughs creation."

Turner Classic Movies critic John Miller described the film as "perhaps the best of Barker's five Tarzan pictures", noting that "the effort to capture genuine scenes in Africa give the film a sense of scope and verisimilitude that previous Tarzan pictures could not approach."
