= Whispering Ghosts =

1942 film by Alfred L. Werker

- Directed by: Alfred L. Werker
- Screenplay by: Lou Breslow
- Story by: Philip MacDonald (original story)
- Produced by: Sol M. Wurtzel
- Starring: Milton Berle; Brenda Joyce
- Cinematography: Lucien Ballard
- Edited by: Alex Troffey
- Music by: Emil Newman; Leigh Harline
- Color process: Black and white
- Production company: 20th Century Fox
- Distributed by: 20th Century Fox
- Release date: May 17, 1942
- Running time: 75 minutes
- Country: United States
- Language: English

Whispering Ghosts is a 1942 American comedy horror film directed by Alfred L. Werker and starring Milton Berle and Brenda Joyce. The film concerns a group of people who try to solve a murder.

== Plot ==
An unusual group of people gather on the wreck of a ship and try to solve a murder committed more than a decade earlier.

== Cast ==
- Milton Berle as H. H. Van Buren
- Brenda Joyce as Elizabeth Woods
- John Shelton as David Courtland
- John Carradine as Norbert (Long Jack)
- Willie Best as Euclid White
- Edmund MacDonald as Gilpin
- Arthur Hohl as Inspector Norris
- Grady Sutton as Jonathan Flack
- Milton Parsons as Dr. Bascomb
- Abner Biberman as Mack Wolf
- Renie Riano as Meg (as Rene Riano)
- Charles Halton as Gruber
- Harry Hayden as Conroy
