= Duel on the Mississippi =

1955 film

- Directed by: William Castle
- Screenplay by: Gerald Drayson Adams
- Story by: Gerald Drayson Adams
- Produced by: Sam Katzman
- Starring: Lex Barker; Patricia Medina
- Cinematography: Henry Freulich
- Edited by: Edwin Bryant
- Color process: Technicolor
- Production company: Clover Productions
- Distributed by: Columbia Pictures
- Release date: September 16, 1955
- Running time: 72 minutes
- Country: United States
- Language: English

Duel on the Mississippi is a 1955 American Western film directed by William Castle and starring Lex Barker and Patricia Medina.

== Plot ==
Andre Tulane, descendant of a plantation family in 1820 Louisiana, is bound to Lili Scarlet, a gambling-ship queen, due to his debts. Together, they face off against river pirates (led by her former fiancé who take control of the boat.

== Cast ==
- Lex Barker as André Tulane
- Patricia Medina as Lili Scarlet
- Warren Stevens as Hugo Marat
- Craig Stevens as René LaFarge
- John Dehner as Jules Tulane
- Ian Keith as Jacques Scarlet
- Chris Alcaide as Anton
- John Mansfield as Louie
- Celia Lovsky as Celeste Tulane
- Lou Merrill as Georges Gabriel (as Lou Merrill)
- Mel Welles as Sheriff
