= Orin Lehman =

Public servant in New York, US

- Orin Lehman, on forearm crutches, speaking at a lectern with ICD insignia and a banner reading, "United Cerebral Palsy."
- Born: January 14, 1920; Manhattan, New York, US
- Died: February 22, 2008 (aged 88); Manhattan, New York, US
- Education: Princeton University (B.A.); New York University (M.A. and Ph.D.)
- Known for: Commissioner of New York State Office of Parks and Recreation
- Spouses: Jane Bagley (m. 1962, divorced) Wendy Vanderbilt (m. 1970; div. 1995)
- Partner(s): Joan Rivers (1993–2001); Monique Van Vooren (2001–2008)
- Children: 3

Orin Allan Lehman (January 24, 1920 – February 22, 2008) was an American public servant who served as New York State’s longest-serving commissioner of New York State Office of Parks and Recreation.

== Early life ==
Lehman was born to a Jewish family of German-Jewish origins in Manhattan on January 24, 1920, the son of Evelyn (née Schiffer) (1893–1970) and Allan Lehman (1885–1952). He was the great-grandson of Mayer Lehman and great-nephew of Herbert H. Lehman, former New York governor and United States senator.

In 1942, he graduated with a B.A. from Princeton University. In 1956, he earned a M.A. in American history from New York University and in 1961, he earned a Ph.D. in American history from New York University.

== Career ==
After college, he served as a pilot in the U.S. Army Air Force during World War II and was seriously injured during the Battle of the Bulge, resulting in the loss of one of his legs and damage to the other. He was awarded the Distinguished Flying Cross and the Purple Heart. After the war, he helped to establish (along with Eleanor Roosevelt and Bernard Baruch) to start Just One Break, a charity dedicated to helping disabled people find employment. In 1947, Lehman worked as an associate for the family firm, Lehman Brothers.

=== Political career ===
In 1950, President Harry S. Truman appointed him to the advisory board of the Economic Cooperation Administration which administered aid to Europe under the Marshall Plan and then served as United States delegate to the United Nations Conference on Trade and Development. Lehman was a sponsor of a fundraising committee organized by the Cuban Families Committee for Liberation of Prisoners of War, which sought to raise money to pay the ransom set by Fidel Castro for the release of those taken captive as a result of the Bay of Pigs Invasion.

In 1965, he unsuccessfully ran for New York City comptroller in 1965 and in 1966, he unsuccessfully ran for Congress. In 1973, he was a member of the New York City Board of Corrections. In 1975, Governor Hugh L. Carey appointed him as commissioner of New York State Office of Parks and Recreation succeeding Robert Moses where he served until 1993.

== Personal life ==
Lehman was married twice. His first marriage was on July 24, 1962, to Jane Bagley, a Carnegie-Mellon Institute graduate who was a granddaughter of R. J. Reynolds. They divorced, and Jane remarried, to yachtsman S. A. Long, before her death in 1988. Before their divorce, they were the parents of one daughter:

- Susan Lehman Carmichael (born 1965), who married Trent Carmichael in 1992.

In 1970, he married for the second time, to Wendy Maria Vanderbilt (1939–2016), daughter of Alfred Gwynne Vanderbilt Jr. Before their divorce in 1995, they were the parents of two daughters:

- Brooke Lehman (born 1972)
- Sage Lehman (born 1975), who married Christopher Ronis in 2009.

He was in an eight-year relationship with comedian Joan Rivers.

In 1970, he tried his hand at producing the off-Broadway play The Effect of Gamma Rays on Man-in-the-Moon Marigolds by Paul Zindel, which won the Pulitzer Prize for best drama.

Lehman died on February 22, 2008, of pneumonia, at his home in Manhattan. His partner at the time was actress Monique Van Vooren.
