= Brenda Joyce (actress) =

American film actress (1917–2009)

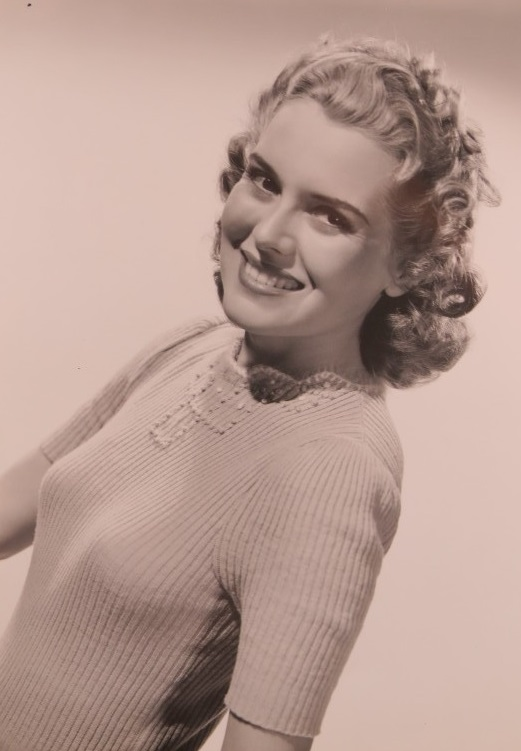
- Joyce in the 1940s
- Born: Betty Graftina Leabo; February 25, 1917; Excelsior Springs, Missouri, U.S.
- Died: July 4, 2009 (aged 92); Santa Monica, California, U.S.
- Other name: Betty Ward
- Occupation: Actress
- Years active: 1939–1949
- Spouse: Owen Ward (1941–1960) (divorced) (3 children)
- Children: 3

Brenda Joyce (born Betty Graftina Leabo, February 25, 1917 – July 4, 2009) was an American film actress. She was best known for playing Jane Porter in RKO's Tarzan films from 1945 to 1949.

== Early life ==
The daughter of Mr. and Mrs. Grafton Leabo, Joyce was born in Excelsior Springs, Missouri on February 25, 1917, and was known to family and friends as Graftina.

When she was 5 years old, she moved with her mother to San Bernardino, California, staying there through her junior high school years. They moved to Los Angeles, California, where she attended high school. She entered the University of Southern California on a scholarship but transferred to the University of California, Los Angeles after one semester.

Between her years in college and those in film, Joyce was a model for photographers. She appeared "in current magazines -- in new automobiles, using toothpaste, modeling shoes, smiling her way through the glossy life of a magazine girl."

== Film career ==
Although she appeared in many B-movies of the 1940s, she had a prominent supporting role in the major film The Rains Came (1939) opposite George Brent and Myrna Loy, and was cast as Maris Hanover in the film, Little Tokyo, U.S.A. (1942). She is best-remembered as the seventh actress to play Jane in the Tarzan series of films. She succeeded Maureen O'Sullivan in the series and appeared in the role five times.

Her first four appearances as Jane were opposite Johnny Weissmuller. However, her last performance as Jane, in Tarzan's Magic Fountain (1949), was with Lex Barker as Tarzan. Joyce and Karla Schramm, from the silent era, were the only two actresses to play Jane opposite two different actors playing Tarzan.

She retired from acting in 1949.

== Later years ==
Joyce retired "at the peak of her career to raise a family." Later, as Betty Ward, she became director of the Catholic Re-settlement Office in Monterey, California, and "helped hundreds of refugees find new lives in America."

== Personal life and death ==
Joyce was married to Owen Ward, whom she had known "since her junior high school days," from 1941 until their divorce in 1960; they had three children, Pamela Ann, Timothy Owen and Beth Victoria.

Joyce died of pneumonia at a nursing home in Santa Monica, California, on July 4, 2009. She was 92. Her final resting place is in Pierce Brothers Westwood Village Memorial Park.

== Filmography ==
Year	Title	Role	Notes
1939	The Rains Came	Fern Simon	
1939	Here I Am a Stranger	Simpson Daniels	
1940	Little Old New York	Harriet Livingston Fulton	
1940	Maryland	Linda	
1940	Public Deb No. 1	Penny Cooper	
1941	Private Nurse	Mary Malloy	
1941	Marry the Boss's Daughter	Fredericka Barrett	
1942	Right to the Heart	Jenny Killian	
1942	Whispering Ghosts	Elizabeth Woods	
1942	The Postman Didn't Ring	Julie Martin	
1942	Little Tokyo, U.S.A.	Maris Hanover	
1943	Thumbs Up	Louise Latimer	
1945	Tarzan and the Amazons	Jane	
1945	I'll Tell the World	Lorna Gray	
1945	Strange Confession	Mary	
1945	The Enchanted Forest	Anne	
1945	Pillow of Death	Donna Kincaid	
1946	Tarzan and the Leopard Woman	Jane	
1946	Little Giant	Miss Ruby Burke	
1946	The Spider Woman Strikes Back	Jean Kingsley	
1946	Danger Woman	June Spenser	
1947	Tarzan and the Huntress	Jane	
1947	Stepchild	Dale Bullock	
1948	Tarzan and the Mermaids	Jane	
1948	Shaggy	Laura Calvin	
1949	Tarzan's Magic Fountain	Jane	(final film role)
