= Ralph Dumke =

American actor (1899–1964)

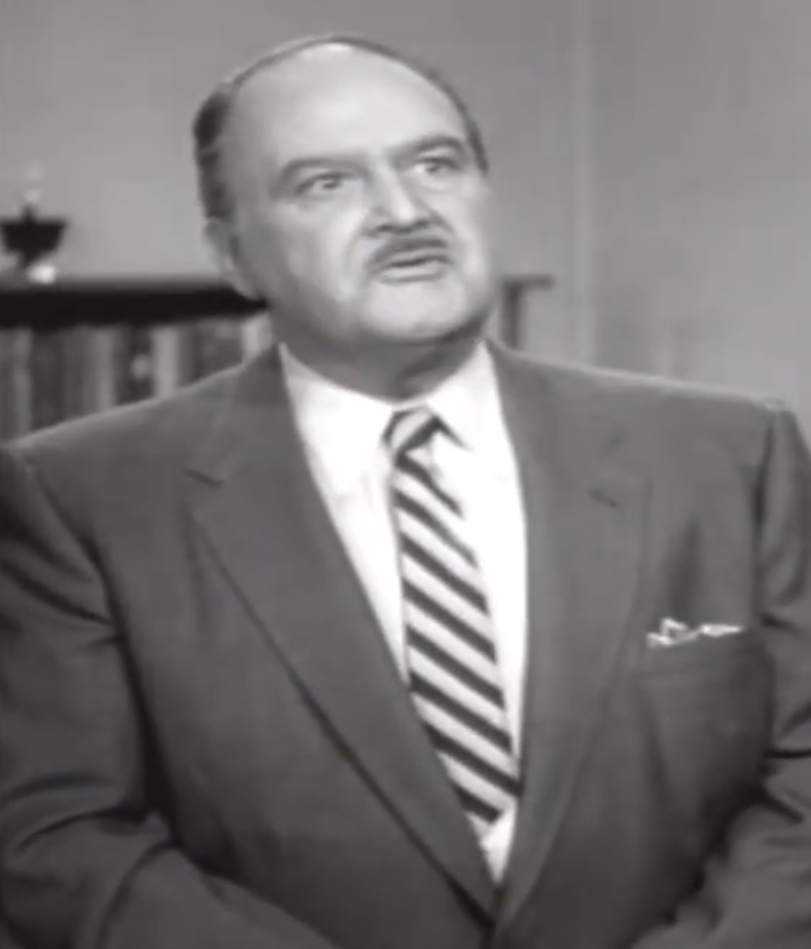
- Dumke in an episode of My Little Margie (1953)
- Born: Ralph Ernest Dumke; July 25, 1899; South Bend, Indiana, U.S.
- Died: January 4, 1964 (aged 64); Sherman Oaks, California, U.S.
- Education: University of Notre Dame
- Occupation: Actor
- Years active: 1934–1961
- Spouse: Greta Leona Edner (m. 1925)
- Children: 2

Ralph Ernest Dumke (July 25, 1899 – January 4, 1964) was an American comedian and actor who had an active career from the early 1920s up until his death in 1964. He rose to fame as part of a comedy duo with Ed East, performing nationally in vaudeville on the B. F. Keith Circuit from 1922 to 1932 and then headlining the nationally popular daily afternoon radio program "Sisters of the Skillet" on NBC Radio. In the 1940s Dumke worked as a character actor in Broadway musicals, and from 1949 to 1964 he worked in American film and television.

== Biography ==
Dumke was born in South Bend, Indiana. He graduated from the University of Notre Dame, where he was a varsity football player. He began his career in Chicago as a vaudeville entertainer in the early 1920s as part of a comedy duo with Ed East entitled "The Mirthquakers". The two men became stars on the B. F. Keith Circuit on which they toured for ten years. A capstone of "The Mirthquakers" performance run was being one of the leading acts for the opening of Radio City Music Hall on December 27, 1932.

The Dumke and East comedy duo were also pioneers in early radio broadcasts in New York City and Chicago in the late 1920s and early 1930s. They became national radio stars on old-time radio, hosting the daily 15 minute afternoon comedy and music program "Sisters of the Skillet" for NBC Radio from 1930 to 1937 in which they performed comedy sketches, jokes, and humorous musical numbers. Dumke later portrayed the role of Captain Walt, the host of Hook 'n' Ladder Follies on NBC (1943–1944).

In 1942 Dumke made his Broadway debut as Hercules in the original production of Lorenz Hart and Richard Rodgers's By Jupiter. He returned to Broadway numerous times during the 1940s, appearing as General Bardini in The Merry Widow (1943–1944), Calchas in Helen Goes to Troy (1944), the Duke of Maddeloni in The Maid as Mistress (1944), Joe Horn in Sadie Thompson (1944–1945), Dapper Dan Pepper in Mr. Strauss Goes to Boston (1945), and Cap'n Andy in Show Boat (1946–1947). He also appeared in several productions with the Los Angeles Civic Light Opera, including The Chocolate Soldier and Rosalinda.

Dumke appeared as a character actor in over forty feature films between 1949 and 1961, including crime pictures, films noir, dramas, mysteries, Westerns, horror, science fiction, musicals, and comedies. Among these were All the King's Men (1949), The Breaking Point (1950), The War of the Worlds (1953), Daddy Long Legs (1955), and Invasion of the Body Snatchers (1956).

On American television, Dumke starred as Captain Billy Bryant in the CBS-TV variety show Captain Billy's Showboat (1948) and was one of the hosts of ABC-TV's Movieland Quiz (1948). He also made guest appearances on several programs during the 1950s and 1960s, including The Bob Cummings Show, I Love Lucy, December Bride, Waterfront, My Little Margie, Perry Mason, and The Andy Griffith Show.

== Personal life and death ==
Dumke was married to Greta Leona Edner from 1925 until his death. They had two children.

On January 4, 1964, Dumke died of "a sudden heart seizure" at his home at age 64.

== Partial filmography ==
- All the King's Men (1949) - Tiny Duffy
- Mystery Street (1950) - A Tattooist
- Where Danger Lives (1950) - Klauber
- The Breaking Point (1950) - Hannagan
- The Fireball (1950) - Bruno Crystal
- When I Grow Up (1951) - Carp
- The Law and the Lady (1951) - James Horace Caighn
- The Mob (1951) - Police Commissioner
- Boots Malone (1952) - Beckett
- Carbine Williams (1952) - Andrew White
- The San Francisco Story (1952) - Winfield Holbert
- We're Not Married! (1952) - Twitchell (uncredited)
- Holiday for Sinners (1952) - Mike Hennighan
- Hurricane Smith (1952) - Ben Hawkins
- She Couldn't Say No (1952) - Sheriff
- The Mississippi Gambler (1953) - F. Montague Caldwell
- Lili (1953) - M. Corvier
- Count the Hours (1953) - Bartender (uncredited)
- The War of the Worlds (1953) - Buck Monahan (uncredited)
- The President's Lady (1953) - Col. Stark
- Hannah Lee (1953) - Alesworth
- It Should Happen to You (1954) - Beckhard (uncredited)
- Alaska Seas (1954) - Dad Jackson
- Rails Into Laramie (1954) - Mayor Frank Logan
- Massacre Canyon (1954) - Phineas J. 'Parson' Canfield
- They Rode West (1954) - Dr. Gibson
- Violent Saturday (1955) - Hotel Desk Clerk (uncredited)
- Daddy Long Legs (1955) - Mr. Bronson (uncredited)
- Hell's Island (1955) - Casino Drunk
- The Desperate Hours (1955) - Clint (uncredited)
- Artists and Models (1955) - Mr. Trimm (uncredited)
- Invasion of the Body Snatchers (1956) - Police Chief Nick Grivett
- Forever, Darling (1956) - Henry Opdyke
- When Gangland Strikes (1956) - Walter Pritchard
- Francis in the Haunted House (1956) - Mayor Hargrove
- The Solid Gold Cadillac (1956) - Warren Gillie
- The Buster Keaton Story (1957) - Mr. Jennings
- Loving You (1957) - Jim Tallman
- Walt Disney Presents: Annette (1958) - Mr. Abernathy
- Wake Me When It's Over (1960) - Sen. Gillespie (uncredited)
- Elmer Gantry (1960) - Salesman in Saloon (uncredited)
- All in a Night's Work (1961) - Baker

== Television ==
Year	Title	Role	Notes
1961	Rawhide	Judge Aikens	S3:E29, "Incident of the Night on the Town"
