= Edward Ashley-Cooper =

Australian actor (1906–2000)

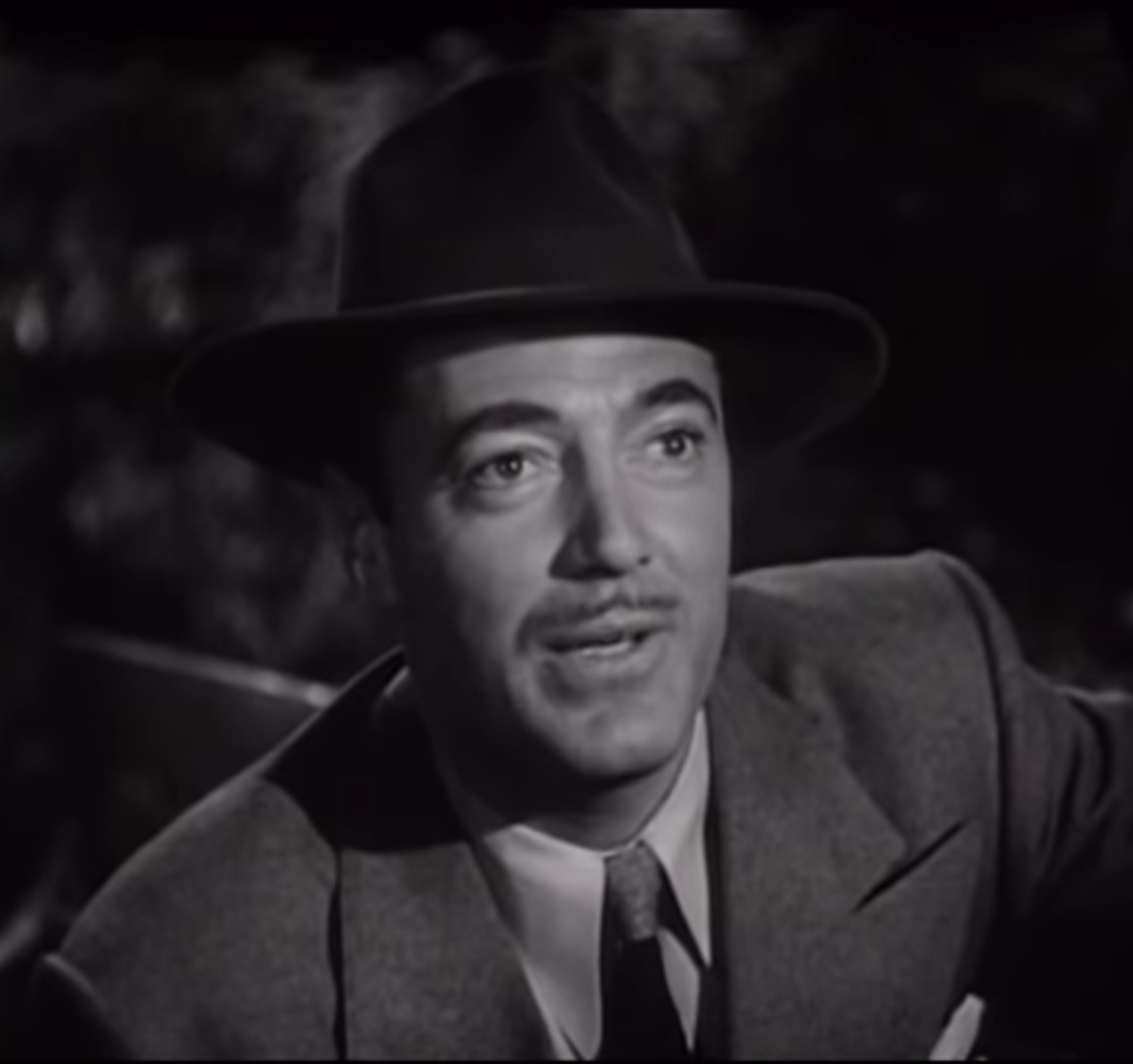
- Ashley in Dick Tracy Meets Gruesome (1947)
- Born: Edward Montague Hussey Cooper; 12 August 1906; Sydney, New South Wales, Australia
- Died: 5 May 2000 (aged 93); San Diego, California, U.S.
- Occupation: Actor
- Years active: 1931–1988
- Spouses: Nina Throsby (m. 1927; div. 1931) Nora Swinburne (m. 1934; div. 1938) Renee Osterman Torres (m. 1943; died 1998)
- Children: 3

Edward Montague Hussey Cooper (August 12, 1906 – May 5, 2000) was an Australian born actor, later active in Britain and the United States. Known by his professional name of Edward Ashley (to avoid confusion with a fellow actor Edward Cooper), Cooper performed in 60 films for Metro Goldwyn Mayer including Pride and Prejudice (1940) where he played George Wickham.

== Origins ==
Edward Montague Hussey Cooper was born on 12 August 1906 in Sydney, Australia, the son of Edward Montague Hussey Cooper and Violet Coghill Maddrell. His father, Edward (known as Montague) was a Master Mariner and a Lieutenant in the Royal Naval Reserve, who worked as a second officer for the P&O Steam Navigation Company in Australia.

Despite his use of the surname Ashley-Cooper, there was no link to the Earl of Shaftesbury.

== Career ==
Ashley was educated in England but made a number of return trips to Australia, and often acted on stage there. He went to Australia in 1927 but returned to England in 1930.

He made a number of films in the United Kingdom before moving to California, United States, in 1940 where his first big role was George Wickham in Pride and Prejudice.

During World War Two Ashley was a corporal in the U.S. Air Force. In 1945 he signed a contract with Republic Pictures.

In the early 1950s, Ashley focused on the stage for a number of years before appearing in Elephant Walk (1954).

After this his career consisted of a large number of mainly supporting roles until 1988, including a recurring character in the Maverick television series called "Nobby Ned Wingate" in the late 1950s.

== Personal life ==
Ashley married a woman in Australia in 1927 and they had two children. They moved to England in 1930. His wife returned to Australia but Ashley did not follow. She sued for maintenance.

== Selected filmography ==
- The Beggar Student (1931) - Nicki
- Men of Steel (1932) - Sylvano
- The White Lilac (1935) - (uncredited)
- Under Proof (1936) - Ward Delaney
- Conquest of the Air (1936) - Minor Role (uncredited)
- Underneath the Arches (1937) - Carlos
- Sing as You Swing (1937) - Harrington
- Saturday Night Revue (1937) - Duke O'Brien
- The Villiers Diamond (1938) - Capt. Dawson
- Spies of the Air (1939) - Stuart
- Pride and Prejudice (1940) - Mr. Wickham
- Sky Murder (1940) - Cortland Grand
- Bitter Sweet (1940) - Harry Daventry
- Gallant Sons (1940) - Al Posna
- Maisie Was a Lady (1941) - Link Phillips
- Come Live with Me (1941) - Arnold Stafford
- You're Telling Me (1942) - Fred Curtis
- The Pied Piper (1942) - Charendon (uncredited)
- The Black Swan (1942) - Roger Ingram (uncredited)
- Love, Honor and Goodbye (1945) - William Baxter
- Gay Blades (1946) - Ted Brinker
- The Madonna's Secret (1946) - John Earl
- Nocturne (1946) - Keith Vincent
- The Other Love (1947) - Richard Shelton
- Dick Tracy Meets Gruesome (1947) - Dr. L. E. Thal
- Tarzan and the Mermaids (1948) - Commissioner
- Tarzan's Peril (1951) - Conners
- Macao (1952) - Martin Stewart
- Elephant Walk (1953) - Planter Gordon Gregory
- El Alamein (1953) - Capt. Harbison
- The Court Jester (1955) - Black Fox
- Darby's Rangers (1958) - Lt. Dave Manson
- King Rat (1965) - Prouty
- Herbie Rides Again (1974) - Announcer at Chicken Race
- Won Ton Ton, the Dog Who Saved Hollywood (1976) - Second Butler
- Beyond the Next Mountain (1987) - Governor
- Waxwork (1988) - Professor Sutherland (final film role)

== Death ==
Edward Ashley died early 5 May 2000, aged 93, from congestive heart failure and was cremated with the remains scattered at sea, off the coast of San Diego County, California, on May 9, 2000. Ashley married actress Renee Torres in 1943 in Acapulco, Mexico. The couple returned to Acapulco in 1947 when Ashley was filming "Tarzan And The Mermaids." Torres died in San Diego County, California, where the couple lived, preceding Edward in death in 1998. They lived in Oceanside, California.
