= Destination Murder =

1950 film by Edward L. Cahn

- Theatrical release poster
- Directed by: Edward L. Cahn
- Screenplay by: Don Martin
- Produced by: Edward L. Cahn; Maurie M. Suess
- Starring: Joyce MacKenzie; Stanley Clements; Hurd Hatfield
- Cinematography: Jackson Rose
- Edited by: Philip Cahn
- Music by: Irving Gertz
- Production company: Prominent Features Inc.
- Distributed by: RKO Pictures
- Release date: June 15, 1950 (Los Angeles)
- Running time: 72 minutes
- Country: United States
- Language: English

Destination Murder is a 1950 American crime film noir directed by Edward L. Cahn and starring Joyce MacKenzie, Stanley Clements and Hurd Hatfield.

== Plot ==
During a five-minute cinema intermission, Jackie Wales leaves the theater. He changes into a messenger's outfit and drives to the house of Arthur Mansfield, whom he shoots before rushing back to the theater and his date.

After her father is shot, Laura Mansfield sees the killer hurdle the house's gate. At the police station, she browses suspects in a lineup. One of them is Jackie, whom she chats with outside the station, not revealing her identity. Laura lets him drive her home and then sees Jackie hurdle the gate as the murderer did.

Police Lt. Brewster, the lead homicide investigator, ignores Laura's tip and charges Arthur Mansfield's business competitor, Frank Niles, with the crime. Laura begins dating Jackie to keep an eye on him. He loses money gambling and visits the Vogue nightclub to receive a payoff from the men who run it. Instead, the boss Armitage brutally beats Jackie while the club's manager Stretch Norton plays music to hide the noise.

Laura is frustrated by Brewster's seeming lack of action in solving her father's case. She takes a job as a cigarette girl at Vogue to learn more about Jackie's employer. Armitage and Stretch reveal that Niles had hired Jackie to kill Mansfield. Alice Wentworth, a gold-digger whom Armitage loves but who flirts with Stretch, approaches Jackie with a plan: if Jackie will write a confession letter implicating Armitage for hiring him, then he will receive a $5,000 blackmail payment that Alice will split with him. The plan is enacted and the scheme works.

Laura falls in love with Stretch and divulges her true identity. She does not realize that Stretch is the true boss of the gang; Armitage works for him as a front. Stretch persuades Alice to double-cross Jackie and she gives him Jackie's confession letter. Armitage starts the player piano, kills Alice, and burns Jackie's letter. Stretch orders Armitage to kill Jackie on the way home.

Eliminating loose ends, Stretch drugs Armitage, places a gun in his hand and acts as though his partner is about to betray him, forcing Laura to shoot Armitage. Brewster does not believe that the case is solved and recruits Laura and Niles for a sting operation in Norton's office, with Niles offering to take Armitage's place. The recorded conversation implicates Norton as the mastermind. He attempts to take Laura hostage, but Brewster frees her and the two men fight. When Norton has the upper hand and is about to kill Brewster, police detective Mulcahy shoots and kills Norton.

== Cast ==
- Joyce MacKenzie as Laura Mansfield
- Stanley Clements as Jackie Wales
- Hurd Hatfield as Stretch Norton
- Albert Dekker as Armitage
- Myrna Dell as Alice Wentworth
- James Flavin as Police Lt. Brewster
- John Dehner as Frank Niles
- Richard Emory as Police Sgt. Mulcahy
- Suzette Harbin as Harriet, Nightclub Maid
- Buddy Swan as Arthur, Blue Streak Messenger
- Bert Wenland as Dave, Blue Streak Messenger
- Franklyn Farnum as Arthur Mansfield, Laura's Father
- Steve Gibson and the Redcaps as Singing Group

== Production ==
Producers Edward L. Cahn and Maurie M. Suess completed Destination Murder under the aegis of their Prominent Features Inc. After screening the film for possible distribution rights, RKO Pictures owner Howard Hughes purchased the film outright for $125,000. Suess used his share of the money to start his own production company for a film project entitled Strange Reunion, with George Raft tentatively slated to star.

== Reception ==
In a contemporary review, critic Herb Rau of The Miami News wrote:

For a while, during the early sequences of "Destination Murder" ... we figured it among the average Class B melodramas. But as the script became more and more confused and rambling, and as impossible situations flashed across the screen, it became apparent that its destination was strictly the junk-pile. The basic premise is in itself ridiculous, for it asks the onlooker to believe that a murderer is capable of pitching woo with the daughter of a man he has killed with no more qualms than swatting a fly. You're told that the principal characters are shady—but you never find out whether they represent a master-gang of hoods or gamblers, or whether they hold a monopoly on ice-cream cones. Payoff comes at the finish, as one of the shady characters is plugged by the cops. He dies the most hilarious death you've ever seen on the screen since the Mack Sennett comedies.

Critic John L. Scott of the Los Angeles Times called the film "a routine crime melodrama".

Reviewer Reed Potter of the Los Angeles Mirror wrote: "You won't believe ... 'Destination Murder' when you see It. Every line of dialogue you ever heard in a movie is in it. ... Best thing about the abortive murder melodrama of a ruthless night club racketeer are the smart sets by Boris Leven and Jacque Mapes."

Syndicated columnist Jimmie Fidler called Destination Murder a "fast-moving whodunit that holds interest despite several very apparent plot fumbles".
