= Love, Honor and Goodbye =

1945 film by Albert S. Rogell

- Directed by: Albert S. Rogell
- Screenplay by: Arthur Phillips; Lee Loeb; Dick Irving Hyland
- Story by: Art Arthur; Albert S. Rogell
- Produced by: Harry Grey
- Starring: Virginia Bruce; Edward Ashley; Victor McLaglen; Nils Asther; Helen Broderick; Veda Ann Borg
- Cinematography: John Alton
- Edited by: Richard L. Van Enger
- Music by: Roy Webb
- Production company: Republic Pictures
- Distributed by: Republic Pictures
- Release date: September 15, 1945
- Running time: 87 minutes
- Country: United States
- Language: English

Love, Honor and Goodbye is a 1945 American comedy film directed by Albert S. Rogell and written by Arthur Phillips, Lee Loeb and Dick Irving Hyland. The film stars Virginia Bruce, Edward Ashley, Victor McLaglen, Nils Asther, Helen Broderick and Veda Ann Borg. The film was released on September 15, 1945, by Republic Pictures.

== Plot ==
Roberta Baxter wants to be an actress. Without telling her, husband Bill financially backs a stage play she's been cast in, secretly hoping for a flop so that Roberta will give up acting and return home.

Getting his wish, the play flops. Bill's scheme, however, is revealed to Roberta by theater director Tony Linnard, who wants her (and her money) for his next production. Bill blurts out that Roberta is not a talented actress, causing her to demand a divorce.

Unbeknownst to anyone else, Bill has begun looking after a young girl, Sally, at the request of her father, a struggling tattoo artist who is away seeking suitable employment. Roberta mistakenly believes her husband has a mistress with a child. She disguises herself as a governess called Fleurette and is hired, unaware that Bill has recognized her.

Roberta develops affection for the child, but then Terry returns and he, too, believes Bill has taken up with another woman. The complications are eventually resolved, and when Fleurette is revealed to be Roberta in disguise, Bill compliments her on what a fine actress she is.

== Cast ==
- Virginia Bruce as Roberta Baxter
- Edward Ashley as William Baxter
- Victor McLaglen as Terry O'Farrell
- Nils Asther as Tony Linnard
- Helen Broderick as Mary Riley
- Veda Ann Borg as Marge
- Jacqueline Moore as Sally
- Robert Greig as Charles
- Victoria Horne as Miss Whipple
- Ralph Dunn as Detective
- Therese Lyon as Miss Hopkins
