= Public Deb No. 1 =

- Theatrical release poster
- Directed by: Gregory Ratoff
- Written by: Don Ettlinger; Karl Tunberg; Darrell Ware
- Produced by: Darryl F. Zanuck
- Starring: George Murphy; Brenda Joyce; Ralph Bellamy
- Cinematography: Ernest Palmer
- Edited by: Robert L. Simpson
- Music by: David Buttolph; Alfred Newman
- Production company: Twentieth Century Fox
- Distributed by: Twentieth Century Fox
- Release date: September 13, 1940
- Running time: 79 minutes
- Country: United States
- Language: English

Public Deb No. 1 (or Elsa Maxwell's Public Deb No. 1) is a 1940 American comedy film directed by Gregory Ratoff and starring George Murphy, Brenda Joyce and Ralph Bellamy.

== Plot ==
A socialite is introduced to communism by her butler.

== Partial cast ==
- George Murphy as Alan Blake
- Brenda Joyce as Penny Cooper
- Ralph Bellamy as Bruce Fairchild
- Elsa Maxwell as herself
- Mischa Auer as Grisha
- Charles Ruggles as Milburn
- Maxie Rosenbloom as Eric
- Berton Churchill as Magistrate
- Franklin Pangborn as Bartender
- Hobart Cavanaugh as Mr. Schlitz
- Lloyd Corrigan as Hugh Stackett
- Ivan Lebedeff as Feodor
- Charles Judels as Ivan
- Elisha Cook Jr. as Communist
- Herman Bing as Dutchman
- Adrian Morris as Guard

== Production ==
The film's sets were designed by the art directors Richard Day and Rudolph Sternad.

== Bibliography ==
- Dick, Bernard F. The Star-Spangled Screen: The American World War II Film. University Press of Kentucky, 2015.
