= The Veils of Bagdad =

1953 American adventure film by George Sherman

- Directed by: George Sherman
- Screenplay by: William R. Cox
- Story by: William R. Cox
- Produced by: Albert J. Cohen
- Starring: Victor Mature; Mari Blanchard
- Cinematography: Russell Metty
- Edited by: Paul Weatherwax
- Color process: Technicolor
- Production company: Universal-International
- Distributed by: Universal Pictures
- Release date: October 7, 1953
- Running time: 82 minutes
- Country: United States
- Language: English

The Veils of Bagdad is a 1953 American adventure film directed by George Sherman and starring Victor Mature and Mari Blanchard.

== Plot ==
In 1560, Antar is sent by Selima, head of the Ottoman Empire, to prevent Pasha Hammam from attempting to overthrow the emperor.

Selima blames Hammam and his assassin Kasseim for the death of her father.

Kasseim's wife, Rosanna, falls in love with Antar, but he wants Selima for himself.

== Cast ==
- Victor Mature as Antar
- Mari Blanchard as Selima
- Virginia Field as Rosanna
- Guy Rolfe as Kasseim
- Leon Askin as Hammam
- James Arness as Targut
- Palmer Lee as Osman
- Nick Cravat as Ahmed
- Ludwig Donath as Kaffar
- Howrd Petrie as Karsh
- Charles Arnt as Zapolya
- Jackie Loughery as Handmaiden
- Thomas Browne Henry as Mustapha
- David Sharpe as Ben Ali
- Sammy Stein as Abdallah
- Bobby Blake as Beggar Boy
- Glenn Strange as Mik-Kel
- Charles Wagenheim as Bedouin Spy
- Chester Hayes as Wrestler
- Thomas A. Renesto as Wrestler
- Hans Schnabel as Wrestler
- Vic Holbrook as Wrestler
- Russ Saunders Troupe as Acrobatic Act

== Production ==
The film was originally known as Prince of Bagdad and was based on an original story. In July 1952 Universal announced Victor Mature would star and Maureen O'Hara was his "likely" co-star. Victor Mature was borrowed from 20th Century Fox. He made it after completing The Glory Brigade and before The Robe – however release was held up until after The Robe had been released.

In October, George Sherman was assigned to direct.

Eventually Maureen O'Hara asked to be relieved of the assignment and her role was taken by Universal contract player Mari Blanchard.

James Arness was borrowed from Wayne-Fellows. The film also featured a young Stuart Whitman, who had just signed a long-term contract with Universal.
