= Mari Blanchard =

American actress (1923–1970)

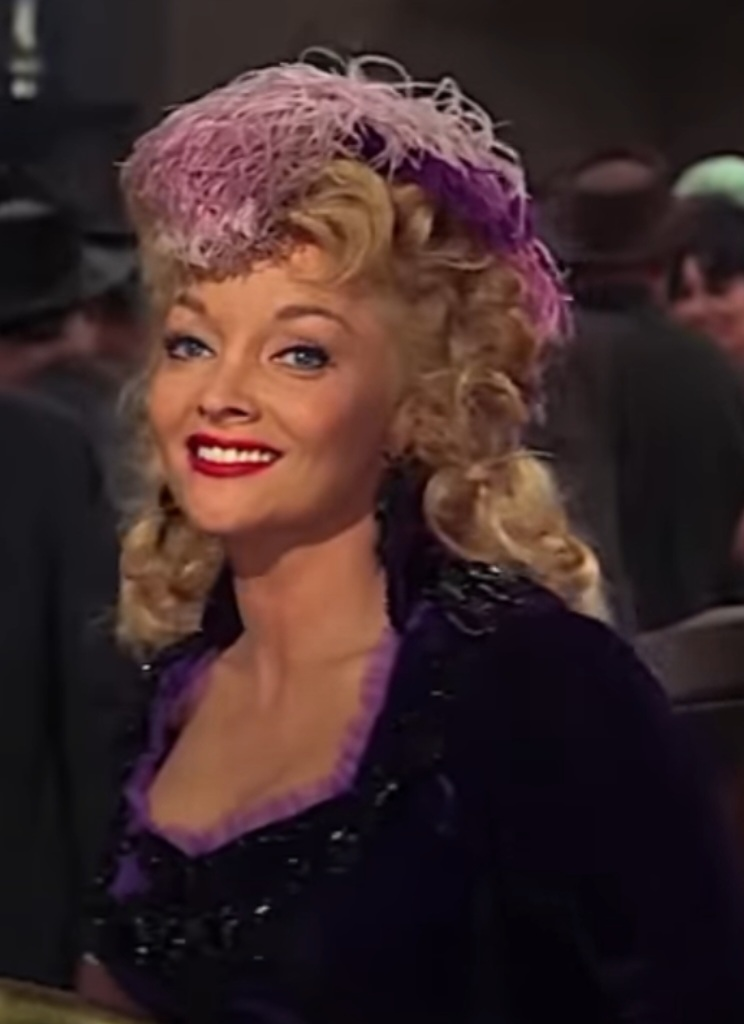
- Blanchard in McLintock! (1963)
- Born: Mary E. Blanchard; April 13, 1923; Long Beach, California, U.S.
- Died: May 10, 1970 (aged 47); Woodland Hills, Los Angeles, California, U.S.
- Occupation: Actress
- Years active: 1947–1968
- Spouses: Reese Hale Taylor, Jr. (m. 1960; div. 1961) George Shepard (m. 1965; div. 1966) Vincent J. Conti (m. 1967)

Mari Blanchard (born Mary E. Blanchard, April 13, 1923 – May 10, 1970) was an American film and television actress, known foremost for her roles as a B movie femme fatale in American productions of the 1950s and early 1960s.

== Early life and career ==
Blanchard was born on April 13, 1923, in Long Beach, California (although some reference sources cite her birth year as 1927). A polio survivor at age nine, Blanchard's health eventually improved enough that she ran away from home and joined a circus in her teens. She then attended the University of Southern California, University of California, Los Angeles, and Santa Barbara State College.

In the late 1940s, Blanchard became a successful print model and film extra, but after a producer saw her in an advertisement for bubble bath, she began to have some limited success as an actress on the "big screen". From 1950 to 1951, she took small roles in a number of films at MGM, RKO, and Paramount, until she was signed by Universal-International in 1952. Her first film at Universal was Back at the Front, followed by the 1953 romantic adventure The Veils of Bagdad in which she co-starred with Victor Mature.

One of Blanchard's more memorable film roles, however, was her portrayal of a Venusian queen, Allura, in the 1953 comedy Abbott and Costello Go to Mars. She then starred in 1954 in Destry, a Western with Audie Murphy, reprising a character whom Marlene Dietrich had played in the story's original 1939 version, Destry Rides Again, but changing the character's name from "Frenchy" to "Brandy".

Some other films of the 1950s in which she is featured include Son of Sinbad (1955), Stagecoach to Fury (1956), She Devil (1957), Jungle Heat (1957), No Place to Land (1958), and Machete (1958). Following her work on these films, Blanchard began to focus increasingly on performing on television, although she did appear in a few other films in the 1960s, including a small but flamboyant role as Camille in McLintock! (1963), directed by Andrew MacLaglen and starring John Wayne.

On television, Blanchard appeared in "Escape from Fear" (1955), an episode of the anthology series Climax!. She made guest appearances in various television series through the late 1960s, including Rawhide (1959 and 1961) – Laura Carter in "Incident of the Big Blowout", Bachelor Father (1959), Tales of Wells Fargo (1960), Laramie (1960), Sea Hunt (1960), Hawaiian Eye (1961), 77 Sunset Strip (1961: two episodes, two different characters), Perry Mason (1963, as the murder victim Irene Chase in the episode "The Case of the Melancholy Marksman"), Burke's Law (1965), The Virginian (1967), and It Takes a Thief (1968). She was a series regular in the short-lived Klondike (1960–1961: 12 episodes).

== Personal life ==
Blanchard was married three times, to lawyer Reese Hale Taylor, Jr. (1960–1961), George Shepard (1965–1966), and photographer Vincent J. Conti (1967–1970). All the unions were childless.

In an interview with Los Angeles Times beauty columnist Lydia Lane in 1955, Blanchard was asked about how often she has had to change her hair coloring for various film roles, and the conversation led to not only an analysis by Blanchard about perceptions people have of "blonds vs brunettes", but also reveals that she had been studying international law at the University of Southern California. Lydia asks, "Were you seriously thinking of being a lawyer?" Blanchard responded, "I was until I discovered the extent to which they discriminate against women."

Retiring from film work after the release of McLintock! in 1963, Blanchard continued to perform on a few television series until her failing health finally forced her to end her career. Her last credited performance was in 1968, playing the part of Madame Gamar on the series It Takes a Thief.

Diagnosed with cancer in 1963, she struggled with the disease in those final performances and during her remaining years.

Blanchard died on May 10, 1970, aged 47, in Woodland Hills, California; in accordance with her wishes, her remains were cremated and scattered at sea.

== Filmography ==
| Year | Title | Role | Notes |
|---|---|---|---|
| 1947 | Copacabana | Copa Girl | Uncredited |
| 1950 | Mr. Music | Chorine | Uncredited |
| 1951 | On the Riviera | Eugenie | Uncredited |
| 1951 | No Questions Asked | Natalie | |
| 1951 | Bannerline | Eloise | Uncredited |
| 1951 | Ten Tall Men | Marie DeLatour | |
| 1951 | The Unknown Man | Sally Tever | |
| 1951 | Overland Telegraph | Stella | |
| 1952 | Something to Live For | Hat Check Girl | Uncredited |
| 1952 | The Brigand | Dona Dolores Castro | |
| 1952 | Assignment – Paris! | Wanda Marlowe | (scenes deleted) |
| 1952 | Back at the Front | Nina - Johnny Redondo's Accomplice | |
| 1953 | Abbott and Costello Go to Mars | Queen Allura | |
| 1953 | The Veils of Bagdad | Selima | |
| 1954 | Rails Into Laramie | Lou Carter | |
| 1954 | Black Horse Canyon | Aldis Spain | |
| 1954 | Destry | Brandy | |
| 1955 | Son of Sinbad | Kristina | |
| 1955 | The Return of Jack Slade | Texas Rose | |
| 1955 | The Crooked Web | Joanie Daniel | |
| 1956 | The Cruel Tower | Mary 'The Babe' Thompson | |
| 1956 | Canasta de cuentos mexicanos | Gladys Winthrop | (segment "Canasta") |
| 1956 | Stagecoach to Fury | Barbara Duval | |
| 1957 | She Devil | Kyra Zelas | |
| 1957 | Jungle Heat | Ann McRae | |
| 1958 | No Place to Land | Iris Lee LaVonne | |
| 1958 | Machete | Jean Montoya | |
| 1958 | Karasu | | |
| 1962 | Don't Knock the Twist | Dulcie Corbin | |
| 1963 | Twice Told Tales | Sylvia Ward | |
| 1963 | McLintock! | Camille Reedbottom | |
