= Night Stage to Galveston =

1952 film by George Archainbaud

- Theatrical release poster
- Directed by: George Archainbaud
- Written by: Norman S. Hall
- Produced by: Armand Schaefer
- Starring: Gene Autry; Virginia Huston; Thurston Hall; Judy Nugent; Robert Livingston; Harry Cording
- Cinematography: William Bradford
- Edited by: James Sweeney
- Production company: Gene Autry Productions
- Distributed by: Columbia Pictures
- Release date: March 18, 1952
- Running time: 61 minutes
- Country: United States
- Language: English

Night Stage to Galveston is a 1952 American Western film directed by George Archainbaud, written by Norman S. Hall and starring Gene Autry, Virginia Huston, Thurston Hall, Judy Nugent and Pat Buttram. The film was released on March 18, 1952 by Columbia Pictures.

== Cast ==
- Gene Autry as Gene Autry
- Virginia Huston as Ann Bellamy
- Thurston Hall as Colonel James Bellamy
- Judy Nugent as Cathy Evans
- Pat Buttram as Pat Buttram
- Robert Livingston as Adjutant General Slayden
- Harry Cording as Ted Driscoll
- Robert Bice as Captain Yancey
- Frank Sully as Policeman Kelly
- Champion as Gene's Horse
