= Tarzan and the She-Devil =

1953 film by Kurt Neumann

- Directed by: Kurt Neumann
- Written by: Karl Kamb; Carroll Young
- Based on: Characters created by Edgar Rice Burroughs
- Produced by: Sol Lesser
- Starring: Lex Barker; Joyce MacKenzie; Raymond Burr; Monique van Vooren; Tom Conway
- Cinematography: Karl Struss
- Edited by: Leon Barsha
- Music by: Paul Sawtell
- Production company: Sol Lesser Productions
- Distributed by: RKO Radio Pictures
- Release date: June 20, 1953 (US)
- Running time: 75 minutes
- Country: United States
- Language: English

Tarzan and the She-Devil is a 1953 American film directed by Kurt Neumann and starring Lex Barker as Tarzan and Joyce MacKenzie as Jane. The seventeenth film of the Tarzan film series that began with 1932's Tarzan the Ape Man, it also features Raymond Burr, Tom Conway and Monique van Vooren, who plays the "She-Devil."

Tarzan is held captive during much of the film, and critics derided it as lacking action. This was Barker's fifth and final appearance as Edgar Rice Burroughs' ape-man. Barker, who had replaced Johnny Weissmuller in the role of Tarzan, would be succeeded by Gordon Scott with Tarzan's Hidden Jungle in 1955.

== Plot ==
Beautiful but deadly Lyra the She-Devil and her ivory-hunting friends have discovered a large herd of bull elephants and plot to capture them, forcing an East African native tribe to serve as bearers. Their ivory poaching plans meet opposition when Tarzan gives his deafening jungle cry. The tusked creatures come running, stomping all over Lyra's plans.

== Cast ==
- Lex Barker as Tarzan
- Joyce MacKenzie as Jane Porter
- Raymond Burr as Vargo
- Monique van Vooren as Lyra, the She-Devil
- Tom Conway as Fidel
- Michael Granger as Philippe Lavarre (as Michael Grainger)
- Henry Brandon as M'Tara, Lycopo Chief

== Production ==
Hal Erickson writes in Allmovie that many scenes in the film "were lifted from the 1934 Frank Buck documentary Wild Cargo.

== Critical reception ==
The Radio Times said "despite the exotic title and a great villain in Raymond Burr, this is a standard tale of ivory-seeking elephant hunters being stymied by the king of the jungle." The Pittsburgh Post-Gazette said "the plot has something to do with illegal elephant hunting" and that "Cheta, the performing chimp, steals what there is of the show."
