= You're Telling Me (film) =

1942 film directed by Charles Lamont

- Theatrical release poster
- Directed by: Charles Lamont
- Screenplay by: Frances Hyland; Brenda Weisberg
- Story by: Charles O'Neil; Duane Decker
- Produced by: Ken Goldsmith
- Starring: Hugh Herbert; Anne Gwynne; Robert Paige; Edward Ashley-Cooper; Ernest Truex; Esther Dale
- Cinematography: Jerome Ash
- Edited by: Philip Cahn
- Production company: Universal Pictures
- Distributed by: Universal Pictures
- Release date: May 3, 1942
- Running time: 60 minutes
- Country: United States
- Language: English

You're Telling Me is a 1942 American comedy film directed by Charles Lamont and written by Frances Hyland and Brenda Weisberg. The film stars Hugh Herbert, Anne Gwynne, Robert Paige, Edward Ashley-Cooper, Ernest Truex and Esther Dale. It was released on May 3, 1942, by Universal Pictures.

== Cast ==
- Hugh Herbert as Hubert Abercrombie Gumm
- Anne Gwynne as Kit Bellamy
- Robert Paige as Dr. Burnside 'Burnsy' Walker
- Edward Ashley-Cooper as Fred Curtis
- Ernest Truex as Charles Handley
- Esther Dale as Aunt Fannie Handley
- Eily Malyon as Mrs. Appleby
- Charles Smith as Bill
- Helen Lynd as Miss Ames
- Romaine Callender as J.T. Dorsett
- Boyd Davis as Driscoll
- Vickie Lester as Mrs. Adalaide Parks
- Linda Brent as Leili
