= Lex Barker =

American actor (1919–1973)

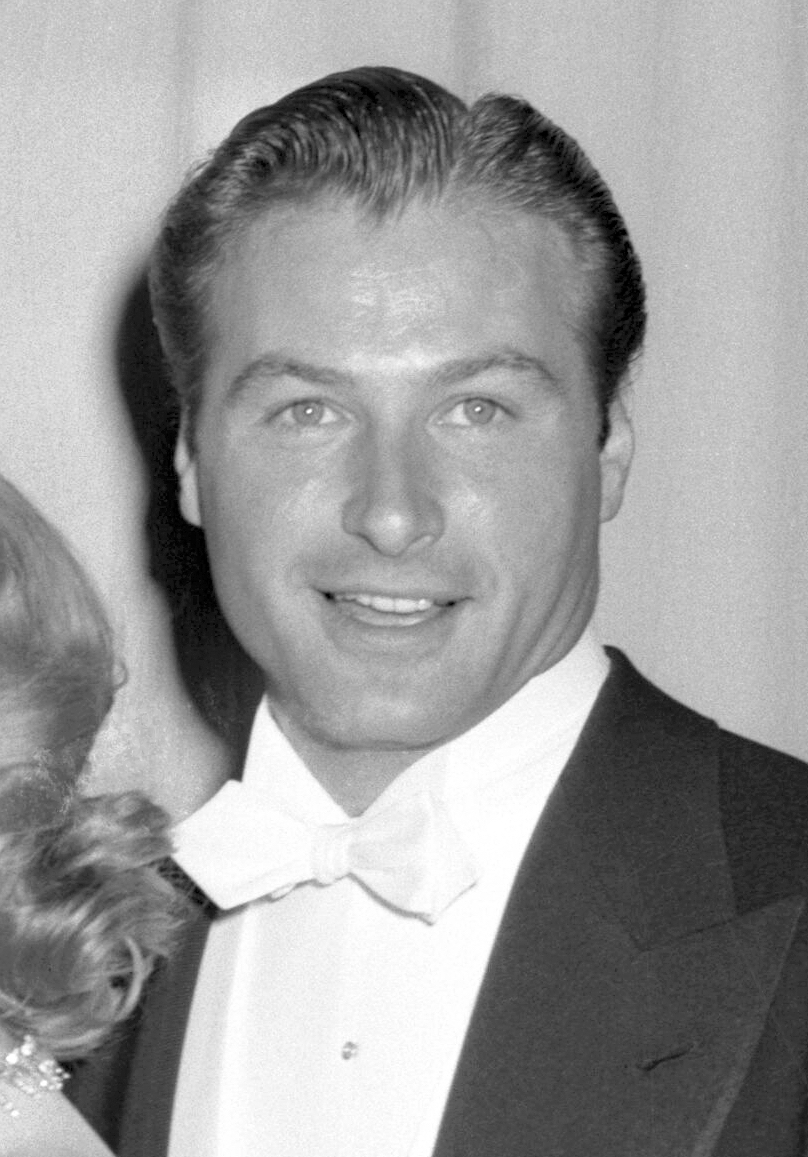
- Lex Barker (1951)
- Born: Alexander Crichlow Barker Jr. May 8, 1919; Rye, New York, U.S.
- Died: May 11, 1973 (aged 54); New York City, U.S.
- Occupation: Actor
- Years active: 1945–1973
- Spouses: Constance Rhodes Thurlow (m. 1942; div. 1950) Arlene Dahl (m. 1951; div. 1952) Lana Turner (m. 1953; div. 1957) Irene Labhart (m. 1959; died 1962) Carmen Cervera (m. 1965; div. 1972)
- Partner: Karen Kondazian (1972–1973)
- Children: 3

Alexander Crichlow Barker Jr. (May 8, 1919 – May 11, 1973) was an American actor. He played Tarzan for RKO Pictures between 1949 and 1953 and later worked in Europe, where he portrayed leading characters from Karl May's novels including Old Shatterhand in a film series by the West German studio Rialto Film. At the height of his fame, he was one of the most popular actors in German-speaking cinema and received Bambi Award and Bravo Otto nominations for the honor.

== Early life ==
Barker was born in Rye, New York, the second child of Alexander Crichlow Barker Sr., a wealthy Canadian-born building contractor and stockbroker, and his American wife, the former Marion Thornton Beals. He had an elder sister, Frederica Amelia "Freddie" Barlow (1917–1980). Of English and Spanish ancestry, Barker was a direct descendant of the founder of Rhode Island, Roger Williams, and of Sir William Henry Crichlow, historical governor-general of Barbados.

Raised in New York City and Port Chester, New York, he attended the Fessenden School and graduated from Phillips Exeter Academy, where he played football and the oboe. He attended Princeton University, but dropped out to join a theatrical stock company, much to his family's chagrin.

== Career ==
=== Theatre ===
Barker made it to Broadway once, in a small role in a short run of Shakespeare's The Merry Wives of Windsor in 1938. He also had a small role in Orson Welles's disastrous Five Kings, which met with so many problems in Boston and Philadelphia that it never made it into New York City.

=== World War II ===
In February 1941, 10 months before the attack on Pearl Harbor, Barker left his fledgling acting career and enlisted in the U.S. Army. He rose to the rank of major during the war. He was wounded in action (in the head and leg) fighting in Sicily. He was awarded the Purple Heart twice.

=== Early film roles ===
Back in the US he recuperated at a military hospital in Arkansas, then upon his discharge from service traveled to Los Angeles. Within a short time he landed a small role in Doll Face (1945), his first film.

A string of small roles followed in films such as Two Guys from Milwaukee (1945) and Cloak and Dagger (1946).

=== RKO ===
Barker signed a contract at RKO. He had small roles in The Farmer's Daughter (1947), Crossfire (1947), and Under the Tonto Rim (1947).

Barker went to Paramount Studios for Unconquered (1947). Back at RKO he was in Dick Tracy Meets Gruesome (1947), Berlin Express (1948), Mr. Blandings Builds His Dream House (1948), The Velvet Touch (1948), and Return of the Bad Men (1948), playing Emmett Dalton.

=== Tarzan ===
In Tarzan's Magic Fountain (1949), Barker became the 10th official Tarzan of the movies. His blond, handsome, and intelligent appearance, as well as his athletic 6'4" frame, helped make him popular in the role Johnny Weissmuller had made his own for 16 years. His Jane was Brenda Joyce, who had been in Weissmuller's last three films.

Barker's second Tarzan movie was Tarzan and the Slave Girl (1950), where Jane was played by Vanessa Brown. In Tarzan's Peril (1951), Barker's Jane was Virginia Huston, with African location footage. Dorothy Hart was Jane in Tarzan's Savage Fury (1952), directed by Cy Endfield. His final Tarzan picture was Tarzan and the She-Devil (1953), opposite Joyce MacKenzie as Jane. Producer Sol Lesser discovered the next Tarzan, Gordon Scott, who resumed the series in 1955.

=== Westerns ===
Lex Barker got the chance to play a non-Tarzan role in Battles of Chief Pontiac (1952), a Western from independent producer Jack Broder. After Barker's tenure as Tarzan, he continued to work in outdoor action pictures. He supported Randolph Scott in Thunder Over the Plains (1953). At Universal he starred in the Western The Yellow Mountain (1954) and The Man from Bitter Ridge (1955).

By 1955 he was established as an all-purpose leading man and character actor in action fare: Duel on the Mississippi (1955); a Merle Oberon film noir The Price of Fear (1956); the war movie Away All Boats (1956); and the thriller The Girl in the Kremlin (1957).

Barker made two films for Howard W. Koch: War Drums (1957) and Jungle Heat (1957),. He went to 20th Century-Fox for The Deerslayer (1957), then did The Girl in Black Stockings (1957).

=== Italy ===
In 1957, with the Hollywood movie studios curtailing their B-picture production, Lex Barker moved to Europe (he spoke French, Italian, Spanish, and some German), where he found popularity and starred in more than 40 European films, including two movies based on the novels by Italian author Emilio Salgari (1862–1911).

He started his European career with a British thriller The Strange Awakening (1958). He went to Italy to star in Captain Falcon (1959), Son of the Red Corsair (1959), The Pirate and the Slave Girl (1959), and Terror of the Red Mask (1960).

Barker had a small but compelling role as Anita Ekberg's fiancé in Federico Fellini's La Dolce Vita (1960). Then he went back to swashbucklers: Knight of 100 Faces (1960), Pirates of the Coast (1960), Robin Hood and the Pirates (1960), and The Secret of the Black Falcon (1961).

=== West Germany ===
Barker had his greatest success in West Germany. There, he starred in movies based on the "Doctor Mabuse" stories (formerly filmed by Fritz Lang), in the movies The Return of Doctor Mabuse (1961). He was in Doctor Sibelius (1962).

Barker then played Old Shatterhand in an adaptation of the novel by popular German author Karl May (1842–1912), Treasure of Silver Lake (1962). It was a huge hit, and 11 movies adapting stories by Karl May followed until 1968. Barker did the comedy Breakfast in Bed (1962), then the adventure movie Storm Over Ceylon (1963). He returned to Italy for The Executioner of Venice (1963) and Kali Yug: Goddess of Vengeance (1963).

Barker reprised his role as Old Shatterhand in Apache Gold (1964), Old Shatterhand (1964), and Last of the Renegades (1965). He went to South Africa for Harry Alan Towers' West German-British international co-production Victim Five (1964), then returned to West Germany for other adaptations of May books: The Treasure of the Aztecs (1965) and The Pyramid of the Sun God (1965) . 24 Hours to Kill (1965) was a British movie. The Hell of Manitoba (1965) and The Desperado Trail (1966) were Westerns.

Though Barker did speak German, he was almost always dubbed in his West German films by Gert Günther Hoffmann, whose distinctive voice contributed to Barker's success.

In 1966, Barker was awarded the "Bambi Award" as Best Foreign Actor in West Germany, where he was a very popular star. He even recorded two songs in German: "Ich bin morgen auf dem Weg zu dir" ("I'll be on the way to you tomorrow", composed by Martin Böttcher, the composer of some of the soundtracks of the Karl May movies) and "Mädchen in Samt und Seide" ("Girl in Silk and Velvet", composed by Werner Scharfenberger).

His later films included Killer's Carnival (1966), and Winnetou and the Crossbreed (1967). In the same year, he starred in a Eurospy film Spy Today, Die Tomorrow and a horror film The Blood Demon, and appeared in the anthology film Woman Times Seven (1967).

He returned to the United States occasionally and made a handful of guest appearances on American television episodes, but Europe, and especially West Germany, was his professional home for the remainder of his life.

== Personal life ==
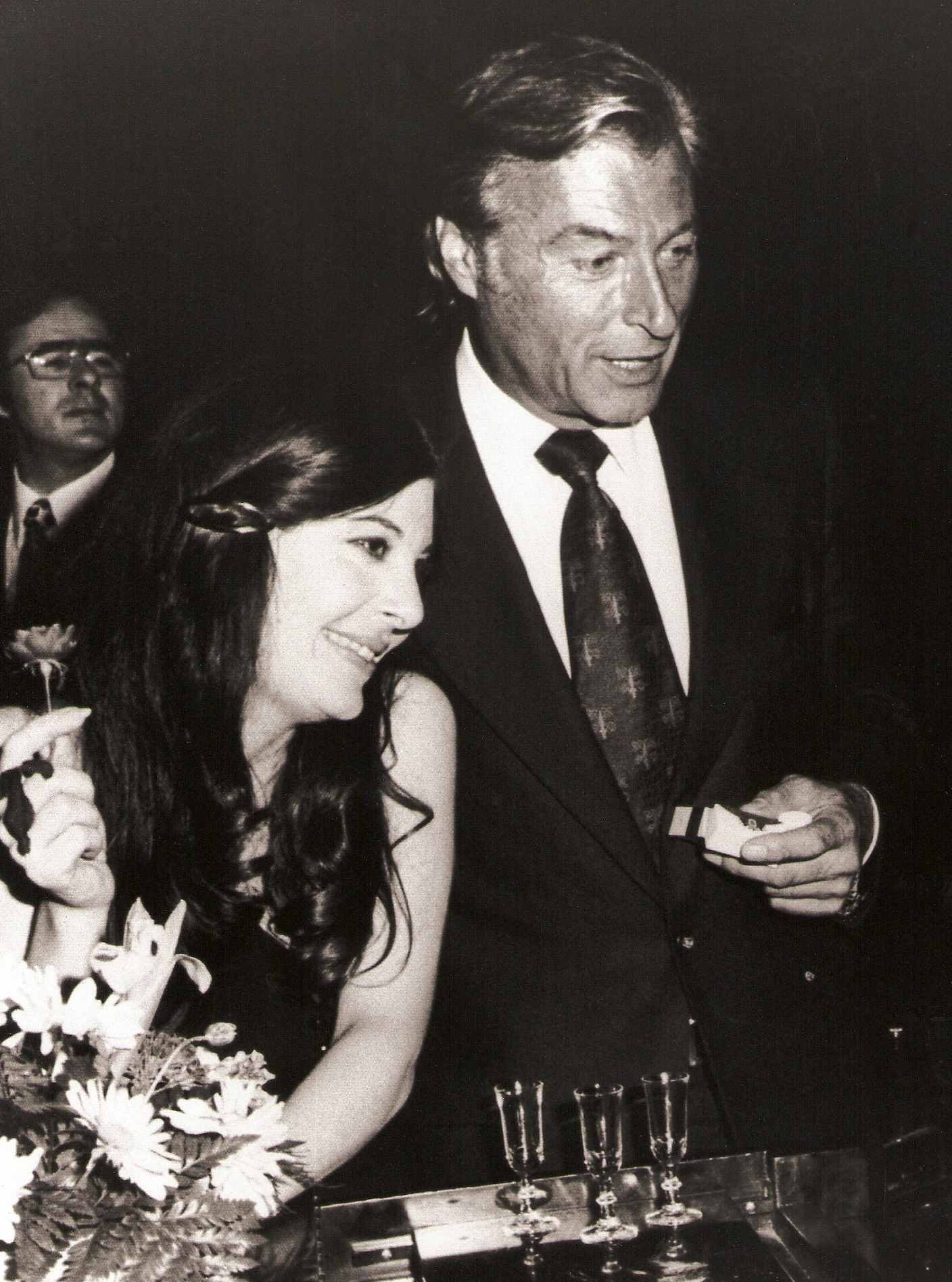
Barker with his fiancée Karen Kondazian in on May 1, 1973, a few days before Barker's death

Barker was married five times:

- Constance Rhodes Thurlow (1918–1975) (married June 27, 1942–divorced 1950), a daughter of Leon Rhodes Thurlow, a vice president of the Decorated Metal Manufacturing Company. They had one daughter, Lynn Thurlow Barker (April 11, 1943 – 2010), and a son, Alexander "Zan" Crichlow Barker III (March 25, 1947 – October 2, 2012). In 1952, Constance Barker married her second husband, John Lawrence Adams, a descendant of John Quincy Adams.
- Actress Arlene Dahl (married 1951–divorced 1952)
- Actress Lana Turner (married September 8, 1953–divorced July 22, 1957). Turner's daughter Cheryl Crane posthumously accused Barker of having repeatedly raped her when she was between the ages of 10 ½ and 13. and that this was the reason for the breakup of the marriage. According to Crane, to avoid public scandal, no charges were ever filed.
- Irene Labhardt (married 1957–1962; her death from leukemia), a Swiss actress. They had one son, Christopher (born 1960), who became an actor and singer.
- Tita Cervera (married 1965–divorced 1972, although divorce not deemed legally valid), a Spanish beauty-pageant winner. Voted Miss Spain in 1962, she later became the wife of movie producer Espartaco Santoni in 1975 (the marriage turned out to be bigamous) and later still, in 1985, the fifth and final wife of billionaire art collector Baron Hans Heinrich Thyssen-Bornemisza.

== Death ==
Barker died on May 11, 1973, of a heart attack, three days after his 54th birthday, while walking down Lexington Avenue on New York City's Upper East Side to meet his fiancée, actress Karen Kondazian. The funeral was held in New York. He was cremated and the ashes were taken by his estranged wife Tita to Spain.

== Filmography ==
=== Film ===
Year	Title	Role	Notes
1945	Doll Face	Coast Guardsman	Uncredited
1946	Do You Love Me	Party Guest	Uncredited
1946	Two Guys from Milwaukee	Fred	Uncredited
1946	Cloak and Dagger	Rescued Man	Uncredited
1947	The Farmer's Daughter	Olaf Holstrom	
1947	Crossfire	Harry	
1947	Under the Tonto Rim	Deputy Joe	
1947	Unconquered	Royal American Officer	Uncredited
1947	Dick Tracy Meets Gruesome	Ambulance Driver	Uncredited
1948	Berlin Express	Soldier	Uncredited
1948	Mr. Blandings Builds His Dream House	Carpenter Foreman	
1948	The Velvet Touch	Paul Banton	
1948	Return of the Badmen	Emmett Dalton	
1949	Tarzan's Magic Fountain	Tarzan	
1950	Tarzan and the Slave Girl	Tarzan	
1951	Tarzan's Peril	Tarzan	
1952	Tarzan's Savage Fury	Tarzan	
1952	Battles of Chief Pontiac	Lt. Kent McIntire	
1953	Tarzan and the She-Devil	Tarzan	
1953	Thunder Over the Plains	Captain Bill Hodges	
1954	The Mystery of The Black Jungle	Tremal Naik	Original (Italian) title: I misteri della giungla nera
1954	Black Devils of Kali	Tremal Naik	Original (Italian) title: La vendetta dei Tughs
1954	The Yellow Mountain	Andy Martin	
1955	The Man from Bitter Ridge	Jeff Carr	
1955	Duel on the Mississippi	André Tulane	
1956	The Price of Fear	Dave Barrett	
1956	Away All Boats	Commander Quigley	
1957	War Drums	Mangas Coloradas	
1957	The Girl in the Kremlin	Steve Anderson	
1957	Jungle Heat	Dr. Jim Ransom	
1957	The Deerslayer	Deerslayer	
1957	The Girl in Black Stockings	David Hewson	
1958	The Strange Awakening	Peter Chance	
1958	Captain Falcon	Pietro	Original (Italian) title: Capitan Fuoco
1959	Son of the Red Corsair	Enrico di Ventimiglia	Original (Italian) title: Il figlio del corsaro rosso
1959	The Pirate and the Slave Girl	Dragon Drakut	Original (Italian) title: La scimitarra del Saraceno
1959	Mission in Morocco	Bruce Reynolds	
1960	Terror of the Red Mask	Marco	Original (Italian) title: Terrore della maschera rossa
1960	La Dolce Vita	Robert	Italian film
1960	Knight of 100 Faces	Riccardo D'Arce	Original (Italian) title: Il cavaliere dai cento volti
1960	Pirates of the Coast	Captain Luis Monterey	Original (Italian) title: I pirati della costa
1960	Robin Hood and the Pirates	Robin Hood	Original (Italian) title: Robin Hood e i pirati
1961	The Secret of the Black Falcon	Captain Don Carlos de Herrera	Original (Italian) title: Il segreto dello sparviero nero
1961	Le Trésor des hommes bleus	Fred	Spanish/French film
1961	The Return of Dr. Mabuse	FBI-Agent Joe Como	Original (German) title: Im Stahlnetz des Dr. Mabuse
1962	The Invisible Dr. Mabuse	FBI-Agent Joe Como	Original (German) title: Die unsichtbaren Krallen des Dr. Mabuse
1962	Doctor Sibelius	Dr. Georg Sibelius	Original (German) title: Frauenarzt Dr. Sibelius
1962	Treasure of Silver Lake	Old Shatterhand	Original (German) title: Der Schatz im Silbersee
1963	Breakfast in Bed	Victor H. Armstrong	Original (German) title: Frühstück im Doppelbett
1963	Storm Over Ceylon	Larry Stone	Original (German) title: Das Todesauge von Ceylon
1963	The Executioner of Venice	Sandrigo Bembo	Original (Italian) title: Il boia di Venezia
1963	Kali Yug: Goddess of Vengeance	Major Ford	Original (Italian) title: Kali Yug, la dea della vendetta
1963	The Mystery of the Indian Temple	Major Ford	Original (Italian) title: Il mistero del tempio indiano
1963	Apache Gold	Old Shatterhand	Original (German) title: Winnetou I
1964	Apaches' Last Battle	Old Shatterhand	Original (German) title: Old Shatterhand
1964	Victim Five	Steve Martin	UK film, US title: Code 7, Victim 5
1964	The Shoot	Kara Ben Nemsi	Original (German) title: Der Schut
1964	Last of the Renegades	Old Shatterhand	Original (German) title: Winnetou II
1965	The Treasure of the Aztecs	Dr. Karl Sternau	Original (German) title: Der Schatz der Azteken
1965	The Pyramid of the Sun God	Dr. Karl Sternau	Original (German) title: Die Pyramide des Sonnengottes
1965	Twenty-Four Hours to Kill	Captain Jamie Faulkner	UK/German co-production film
1965	The Hell of Manitoba	Clint Brenner	Original (German) title: Die Hölle von Manitoba
1965	Wild Kurdistan	Kara Ben Nemsi	Original (German) title: Durchs wilde Kurdistan
1965	The Desperado Trail	Old Shatterhand	Original (German) title: Winnetou III
1965	Kingdom of the Silver Lion	Kara Ben Nemsi	Original (German) title: Im Reiche des silbernen Löwen
1966	Who Killed Johnny R.?	Sam Dobie	Original (German) title: Wer kennt Johnny R.?
1966	Killer's Carnival	Glenn Cassidy	Original (French) title: Le carnaval des barbouzes, (Rio segment)
1966	Winnetou and the Crossbreed	Old Shatterhand	Original (German) title: Winnetou und das Halbblut Apanatschi
1967	Woman Times Seven	Rik	(segment "Super Simone")
1967	Spy Today, Die Tomorrow	Bob Urban	Original (German) title: Mister Dynamit – Morgen küßt Euch der Tod
1967	The Blood Demon	Roger Mont Elise	Original (German) title: Die Schlangengrube und das Pendel
1968	The Valley of Death	Old Shatterhand	Original (German) title: Winnetou und Shatterhand im Tal der Toten
1970	Aoom	Ristol	
1970	When You're With Me	Kapitän Hannes Schneider	Original (German) title: Wenn du bei mir bist

=== Television ===
Year	Title	Role	Notes
1952	Tales of Tomorrow	Kurt	Episode: "Red Dust"
1956	Lux Video Theatre	Stephen Dexter	Episode: "Hired Wife"
1956–57	Studio 57	Brad / Robin Ridour	2 episodes
1960	Tales of the Vikings	König Gordar	Episode: "The Shield"
1963	Berlin-Melodie		Television film
1969	It Takes a Thief	Kurt 'Matt' Matson	Episode: "The King of Thieves"
1971	The Name of the Game	Will Cheyenne	Episode: "The Man Who Killed a Ghost"
1971	The F.B.I.	Owen Stuart	Episode: "Three-Way Split"
1972	Night Gallery	Charlie McKinley	Segment: "The Waiting Room"

== Discography ==
- "Ich bin morgen auf dem Weg zu dir" / "Mädchen in Samt und Seide" 1965, Single, Decca D 19 725
- Winnetou du warst mein Freund 1966, CD, Bear Family Records

== See also ==
- Johnny Weissmuller
- Tarzan
- Jock Mahoney
- Denny Miller
- Buster Crabbe
- Mike Henry (football)

== Sources ==
- Bergfelder, Tim (2005). International Adventures: German Popular Cinema and European Co-productions in the 1960s. New York: Berghahn Books. ISBN 1-57181-538-4.
- Christ, Manfred (1994). Von Tarzan bis Old Shatterhand – Lex Barker und seine Filme [From Tarzan to Old Shatterhand - Lex Barker and his Films] (in German). Tuningen, Germany: Günter Albert Ulmer Verlag. ISBN 3-924191-81-6.
- Crane, Cheryl; Jahr, Cliff (1988). Detour: A Hollywood Tragedy: My Life With Lana Turner, My Mother. London: Penguin Group. ISBN 0-7181-3069-3.
- Drew, Bernard A. (1986). Motion Picture Series and Sequels: A Reference Guide. New York: Routledge. ISBN 9780415726658.
- Hughes, Howard (2011). Cinema Italiano: The Complete Guide from Classics to Cult. London and New York: I.B. Tauris. ISBN 978-1-84885-607-3.
- Kalat, David (2005). The Strange Case of Dr. Mabuse: A Study of the Twelve Films and Five Novels. Jefferson, North Carolina: McFarland & Company. ISBN 978-0-7864-2337-8.
- Michael, Paul; Parish, James Robert (1969). The American Movies Reference Book: The Sound Era. Englewood Cliffs, New Jersey: Prentice Hall. ISBN 978-0130281340.
- Monush, Barry (2003). The Encyclopedia of Hollywood Film Actors: From the Silent Era to 1965. New York: Applause Theatre & Cinema Books. ISBN 1-55783-551-9.
- Rowan, Terry (2013). The American Western A Complete Film Guide. Lulu.com. ISBN 978-1-300-41858-0.
- Schneider, Jerry L. (2012). Lord of the Jungle Filming Locations of California. California: Corriganville Press. ISBN 978-0-9831972-7-0.
