= Joyce MacKenzie =

American actress (1925–2021)

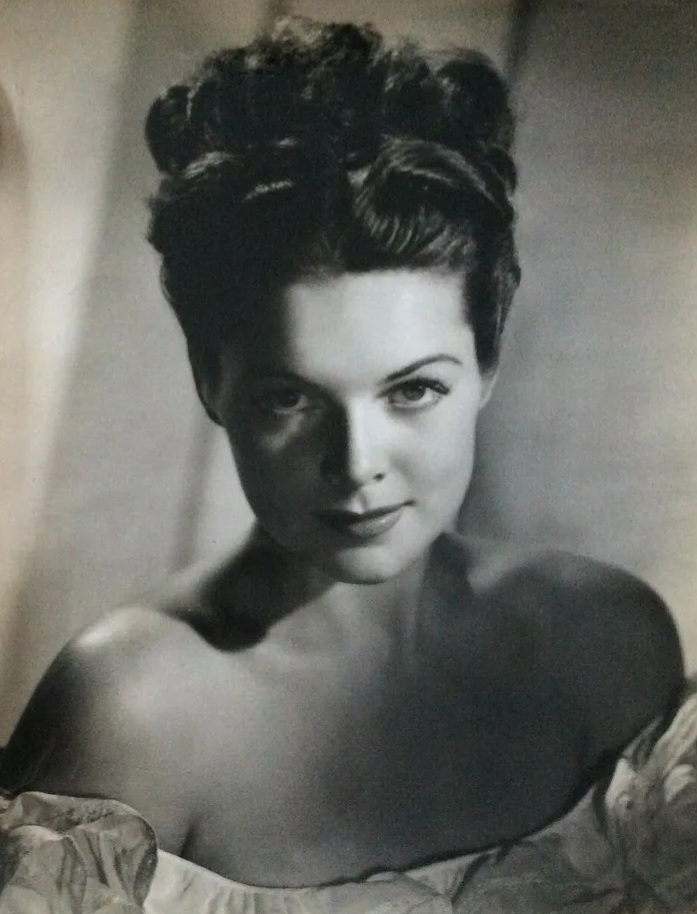
- Mackenzie in 1950
- Born: Joyce Elaine MacKenzie; October 13, 1925; Redwood City, California, U.S.
- Died: June 10, 2021 (aged 95); Los Angeles, California, U.S.
- Occupation(s): Actress; English teacher
- Years active: 1946–1961
- Known for: Jane, wife of Tarzan, in Tarzan and the She-Devil; Destination Murder; Broken Arrow
- Spouse(s): Walter H. Leimert Jr (m. 1952–60, divorced; 2 children); Robert L. Driver (m. 1961–66, divorced); Victor Benedict Hassing (m. 1972–80, his death)
- Children: 2

Joyce Elaine MacKenzie (October 13, 1925 – June 10, 2021) was an American actress who appeared in films and television from 1946 to 1961. She might be best remembered for being the eleventh actress to portray Jane. She played the role opposite Lex Barker's Tarzan in Tarzan and the She-Devil (1953).

== Early life through World War II ==
MacKenzie was the daughter of Dr. and Mrs. Norman MacKenzie. She was active in sports in high school, winning an award for "her all-round sports ability."

During World War II, MacKenzie worked as a carpenter's helper in shipyards in San Francisco. Her opportunity for acting came when she was discovered on her job as cashier at the Pasadena Playhouse in the summer of 1948.

== Film actor ==
MacKenzie starred in a film noir, Destination Murder (1950). She appeared with James Stewart in the western Broken Arrow (also 1950), as the wife of Robert Mitchum in the crime drama The Racket (1951) and as a publisher's daughter trying to wrest control of editor Humphrey Bogart's newspaper in Deadline - U.S.A. (1952). MacKenzie's character and Jane Russell's exchanged identities in a musical, The French Line (1954).

== Later years ==
Her final appearance was in the role of Nancy Gilman in the Perry Mason television series episode, "The Case of the Duplicate Daughter" (1961). After her acting career ended, MacKenzie was an English teacher; one of her students was radio host Anthony Cumia of Opie and Anthony.

== Personal life and death ==
On November 26, 1952, MacKenzie married Walter H. "Tim" Leimert Jr. in Hollywood, California; the couple had two sons but divorced in 1960. In 1961, Joyce married Robert L. (Keiki) Driver until their divorce in 1966. In 1972, she married Victor Benedict Hassing. They remained married until his death at age 64 on October 29, 1980.

MacKenzie died on June 10, 2021, in Hollywood, California, at the age of 95.

== Filmography ==
Year	Title	Role	Notes
1946	Tomorrow Is Forever	Cherry Davis	
1946	The Kid from Brooklyn	Goldwyn Girl	Uncredited
1949	Whirlpool	Daisy – Telephone Operator	Uncredited
1949	Twelve O'Clock High	Nurse	Uncredited
1950	Mother Didn't Tell Me	Helen Porter	
1950	A Ticket to Tomahawk	Ruby	Uncredited
1950	Destination Murder	Laura Mansfield	
1950	Stella	Peggy Denny	
1950	Broken Arrow	Terry	
1951	On the Riviera	Mimi	
1951	His Kind of Woman	Lady Gwendolyn in Film	Uncredited
1951	People Will Talk	Gussie	Uncredited
1951	The Racket	Mary McQuigg	
1951	The Model and the Marriage Broker	Doris	Uncredited
1952	Deadline - U.S.A.	Katherine Garrison Geary	
1952	Wait till the Sun Shines, Nellie	Bessie Jordan	
1952	O. Henry's Full House	Hazel Woods	(segment "The Clarion Call"), (scenes deleted)
1952	Night Without Sleep	Laura Harkness	
1953	The I Don't Care Girl	Babette	Uncredited
1953	Tarzan and the She-Devil	Jane	
1953	The French Line	Myrtle Brown	
1954	Rails Into Laramie	Helen Shanessy	
