= Virginia Huston =

American actress (1925–1981)

- Virginia Huston in 1946
- Born: Virginia Houston; April 24, 1925; Wisner, Nebraska, U.S.
- Died: February 28, 1981 (aged 55); Santa Monica, California, U.S.
- Occupation: Actress
- Years active: 1937–1954
- Spouse: Manus Paul Clinton II (m. 1952)

Virginia Huston (April 24, 1925 – February 28, 1981) was an American actress.

== Early years ==
Huston was born in Wisner, Nebraska, the daughter of Marcus and Mary Agnes Houston, and she had two brothers. Once she began her acting career, she changed the spelling of her last name to match that of Walter and John Huston. She attended Duchesne Catholic School for Girls in Omaha and appeared in stage productions as a student there.

When Huston was 12, she first appeared on radio in an episode of Calling All Cars. Huston gained early experience on stage by appearing in plays presented by the Omaha Community Playhouse.

== Film ==
Huston's first film was Desirable Woman. She appeared in many 1940s and 1950s film noir and adventure films. Signing with RKO in 1945, her first film was opposite George Raft in Nocturne (1946). Her singing voice in the nightclub was redubbed by a singer. Huston appeared as Jane in the fifteenth Tarzan film, Tarzan's Peril (1951).

Her other films include the film noir Out of the Past (released in the UK as Build My Gallows High) (1947), in which she plays Robert Mitchum's girlfriend. She appeared in The Racket (1951), which also starred Mitchum, and in the Joan Crawford dramas Flamingo Road (1949) and Sudden Fear (1952).

Huston suffered a broken back in an automobile accident, which disrupted her career at its peak. When she returned, she dropped to minor roles and "B"-level films.

== Personal life and death ==
Huston retired from films after marrying Manus Paul Clinton II, a real estate agent, in 1952. She died of cancer in 1981.

== Filmography ==
Year	Title	Role	Notes
1946	Nocturne	Carol Page	
1947	Out of the Past	Ann Miller	
1949	Flamingo Road	Annabelle Weldon	
1949	The Doolins of Oklahoma	Elaine Burton	
1950	Women from Headquarters	Joyce	
1951	Tarzan's Peril	Jane	
1951	The Highwayman	Lady Ellen Douglas	
1951	The Racket	Lucy Johnson	
1951	Flight to Mars	Carol Stafford	
1952	Night Stage to Galveston	Ann Bellamy	
1952	Sudden Fear	Ann Taylor	
1953–1954	Ford Theatre	Evelyn Austin / Deborah	3 episodes, (final appearance)
1954	Knock on Wood	Audrey Greene	
