= Angel's Holiday =

1937 film by James Tinling

- Theatrical release poster
- Directed by: James Tinling
- Story by: Frank Fenton; Lynn Root
- Produced by: Darryl F. Zanuck
- Starring: Jane Withers; Robert Kent; Joan Davis; Sally Blane
- Cinematography: Daniel B. Clark
- Edited by: Nick DeMaggio
- Music by: Score: Samuel Kaylin; Songs: Harold Howard; William Telaak
- Production company: 20th Century Fox
- Distributed by: 20th Century Fox
- Release date: June 7, 1937
- Running time: 76 minutes
- Country: United States
- Language: English

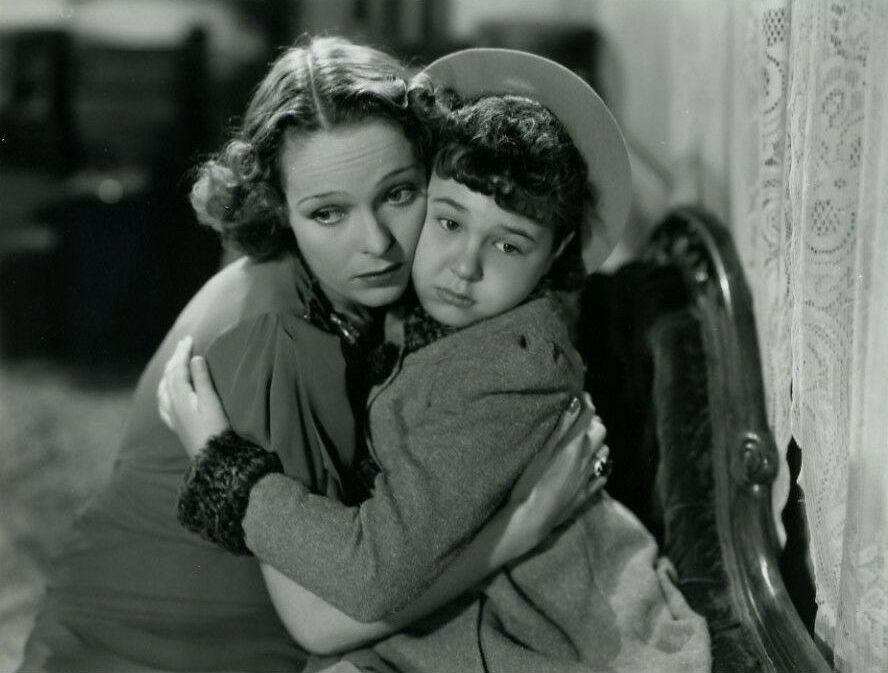
Press photo of Sally Blane (l.) and Jane Withers in a scene from the film

Angel's Holiday is a 1937 American comedy film directed by James Tinling and written by Frank Fenton and Lynn Root. The film stars Jane Withers, Joan Davis, Sally Blane, Robert Kent, Harold Huber and Frank Jenks. The film was released on June 7, 1937, by 20th Century Fox.

== Cast ==
- Jane Withers as June 'Angel' Everett
- Joan Davis as Strivers
- Sally Blane as Pauline Kaye
- Robert Kent as Nick Moore
- Harold Huber as Bat Regan
- Frank Jenks as Butch Broder
- Ray Walker as Crandall
- John Qualen as Waldo Everett
- Lon Chaney Jr. as Eddie
- Al Lydell as Gramp Hiram Seely
- Russell Hopton as Gus
- Paul Hurst as Sgt. Murphy
- John Kelly as Maxie
- George Taylor as Eddie
- Cy Kendall as Chief of Police
- Charles Arnt as Everett
