= Youth Will Be Served =

- Film poster
- Directed by: Otto Brower
- Screenplay by: Wanda Tuchock
- Story by: Ruth Fasken; Hilda Vincent
- Produced by: Lucien Hubbard
- Starring: Jane Withers; Jane Darwell; Robert Conway; Elyse Knox; Joe Brown Jr. John Qualen; Charles Holland
- Cinematography: Edward Cronjager
- Edited by: Nick DeMaggio
- Music by: Emil Newman
- Distributed by: 20th Century Fox
- Release date: November 22, 1940
- Running time: 68 minutes
- Country: United States
- Language: English

Youth Will Be Served is a 1940 American musical film directed by Otto Brower and starring Jane Withers and Jane Darwell.

== Plot ==
A southern girl (Withers) goes to a National Youth Association camp after her father goes to jail for bootlegging. When a mean tycoon tries to buy the campground for himself, she stages a show that endears her to him. When her father escapes and catches the crooks who took the tycoon's money, all is saved.

== Cast ==
- Jane Withers as Eadie-May
- Jane Darwell as Supervisor Stormer
- Joe Brown Jr. as Benjy
- Robert Conway as Dr. Bob
- Elyse Knox as Pamela
- John Qualen as Clem Howie
- Charles Holland as Ephraim
- Lillian Porter as Lisbeth
- Clara Blandick as Miss Bradshaw
- Tully Marshall as Rufus Britt
- Richard Lane as Mr. Hewitt
