= Paddy O'Day =

1936 US comedy-drama film by Lewis Seiler

- Directed by: Lewis Seiler
- Written by: Lou Breslow; Edward Eliscu
- Story by: Sonya Levien
- Produced by: Sol M. Wurtzel
- Starring: Jane Withers; Pinky Tomlin; Rita Hayworth; Jane Darwell
- Cinematography: Arthur Miller
- Edited by: Alfred DeGaetano
- Music by: Samuel Kaylin
- Production company: 20th Century Fox
- Distributed by: 20th Century Fox
- Release date: January 17, 1936
- Running time: 75 minutes
- Country: United States
- Language: English

Paddy O'Day is a 1936 American comedy drama film directed by Lewis Seiler and released by 20th Century Fox. It stars Jane Withers, Pinky Tomlin, and Rita Hayworth (credited as Rita Cansino). The story follows the adventures of a plucky Irish girl who arrives at Ellis Island only to discover that her mother, a cook in a wealthy Long Island home, has died. Hiding from the immigration officers who want to deport her, she charms everyone she meets, including the service staff and reclusive young master of the house. She goes to live with a family of Russian dancers that she met on the ship, and performs with them in their nightclub. Withers uses a heavy Irish brogue for her character and sings one song with an Irish accent and another song with a Russian accent. She also dances in several numbers, while Hayworth performs a traditional Russian dance in a nightclub revue.

== Plot ==
Eight-year-old Paddy O'Day, a friendly and spirited Irish girl, travels to America to join her mother, a cook for a wealthy family. Aboard ship she befriends the Petrovitch family of Russian dancers and performs a dance with them while trying to hide the fact that she has brought her dog, Tim, along. Upon arrival at Ellis Island, the immigration officials are informed that Paddy's mother has died and prepare to send her back to Ireland. To keep her calm, they tell her that her mother is very sick, and move her to a locked dormitory on the island. Paddy escapes from the dormitory and hides with her dog in an empty milk canister. The milk truck transports her to Manhattan, where she hops out and is bewildered by all the noise and traffic. A band of street urchins accost her and she beats up one of them with the help of her dog. She charms the policeman who chases away the boy and he gives her a ride on his motorcycle. Along the way he stops a car for speeding and tells the driver to take Paddy to Long Island so she can be reunited with her mother.

In the house where Paddy's mother worked, much effort is being made by the service staff to get Aunt Flora and Aunt Jane, two elderly and fussy spinsters, ready for a trip. The service staff decide to hide Paddy's presence from the family, who would otherwise report her to the immigration authorities. Dora the maid breaks the news to Paddy that her mother has died. Paddy's dog escapes and chases the aunts' cat Mathilda. Paddy finally collars Tim and hides in the room where Roy, the young reclusive master of the house, is examining his taxidermy collection of birds. Paddy charms Roy, and when Tim destroys one of Roy's models, he still likes her and agrees to conceal her presence from his aunts.

Tamara Petrovitch, Paddy's Russian friend from the ship, comes looking for Paddy with her brother Mischa, who owns a nightclub. They convince Roy to have Paddy live with them. Seeing the wealth of the property, Mischa tries to convince Roy to become a partner in his nightclub. Roy agrees and also falls in love with Tamara, composing and playing an original song for her. By the time the aunts return from their trip, Roy has changed from an eccentric recluse to a mustached, guitar-playing songster who wears a colorful Russian costume and has a liking for vodka. He has also switched his stuffed bird collection for live birds. His aunts are shocked, but Roy tells them his new friends have shown him how to live. Mischa's nightclub debuts with a stage show featuring Paddy singing and dancing in the song "I Like Balalaika" with a troupe of balalaika players, and Tamara dancing in a traditional Russian dance. Alerted by the aunts' private detective, Officer McGuire arrives to arrest and deport Paddy, but Roy announces that he and Tamara were secretly married the day before and that they will adopt her.

== Cast ==
- Jane Withers as Paddy O'Day
- Pinky Tomlin as Roy Ford (listed as Ray Ford in the film credits)
- Rita Cansino as Tamara Petrovitch
- Jane Darwell as Dora
- George Givot as Mischa
- Francis Ford as Officer McGuire
- Vera Lewis as Aunt Flora
- Louise Carter as Aunt Jane
- Russell Simpson as Benton

== Production ==
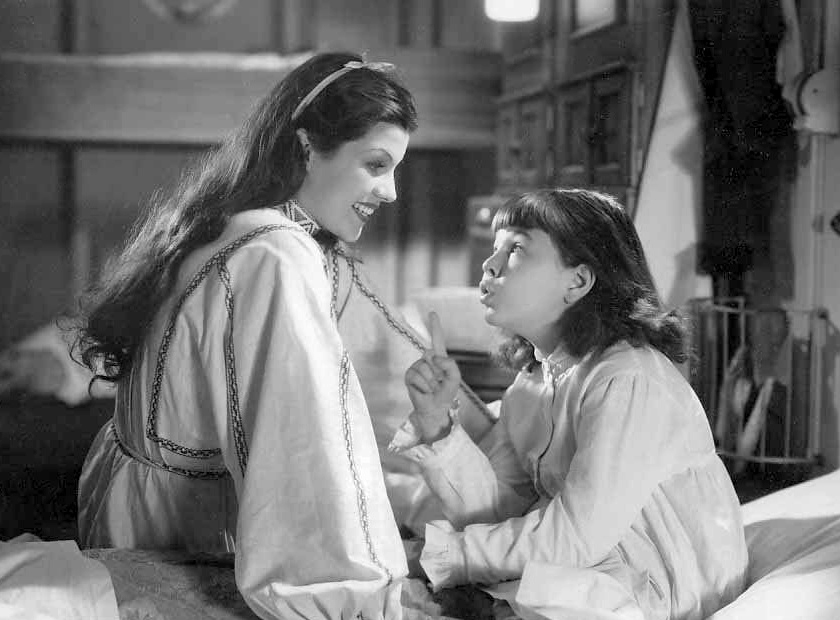
Rita Hayworth (left) and Jane Withers aboard the ship en route to America

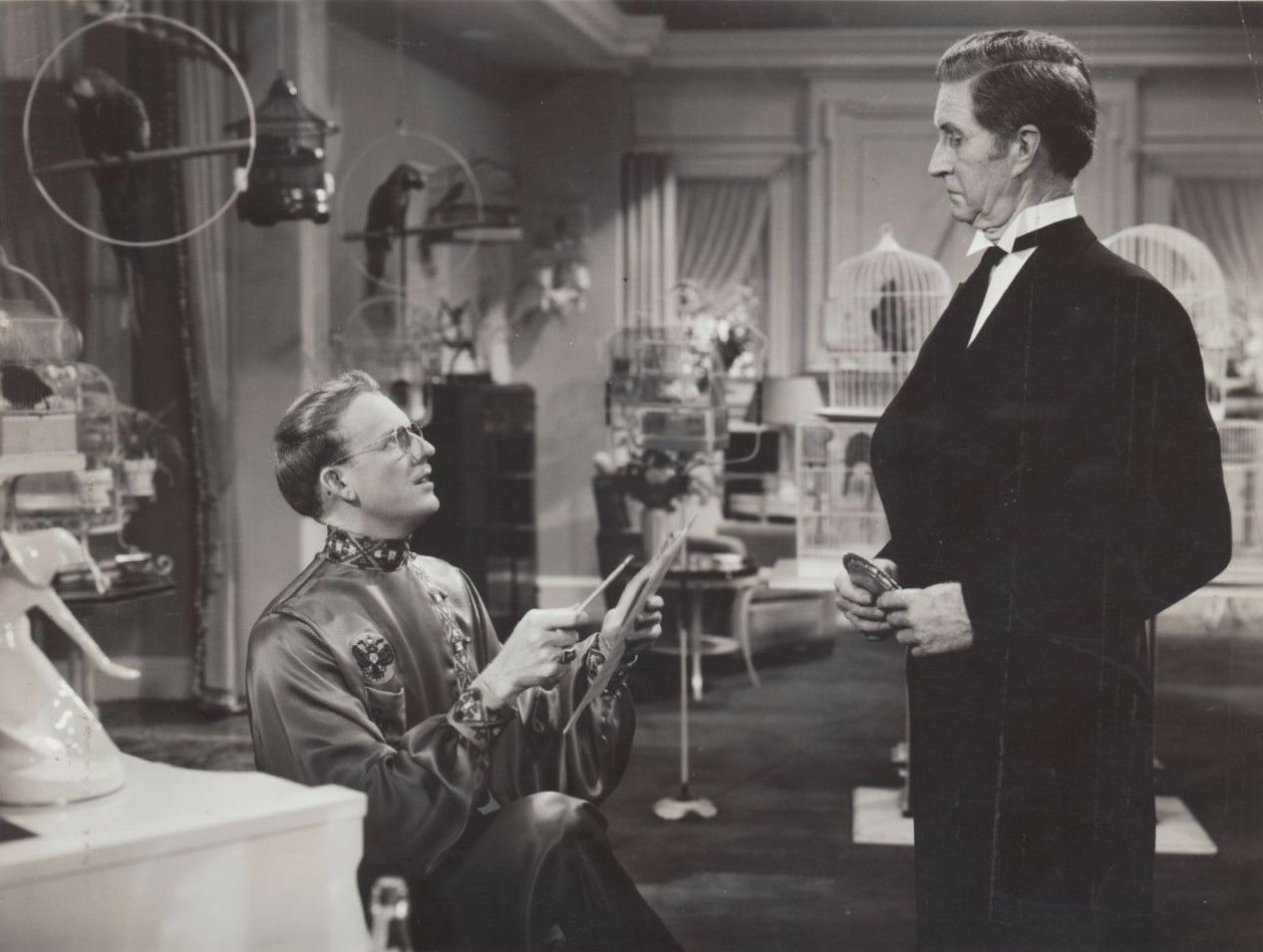
Pinky Tomlin (left) and Russell Simpson after Tomlin's character's transformation

=== Development ===
The film's working titles were The Immigrant, Immigrants, and The Little Immigrant. Fox executives originally intended this film to be a remake of the studio's 1931 film Delicious, although not many similarities remain.

=== Casting ===
Withers was making four or five films a year for Fox since her breakout role in the 1934 Shirley Temple vehicle Bright Eyes. However, before Paddy O'Day was released, she informed the studio that she would not continue to work unless her weekly salary was raised from $150 to $1,000. Fox complied with this demand. Withers showed off her talent for accents in the film, singing one song with an Irish accent and another song with a Russian accent.

Sixteen-year-old Rita Hayworth was credited as Rita Cansino in this, her fourth screen appearance. Her stage name would be changed to Rita Hayworth the following year. Hayworth performed her own dances in the film; her singing voice may or may not have been dubbed.

=== Music ===
Several original songs were composed for the film. They including "Keep That Twinkle in Your Eye" and "I Like a Balalaika", both with lyrics by Edward Eliscu and music by Harry Akst. (Note: Bradley and Wojcik credit the songwriting team as Edward Eliscu and Troy Sanders, and Ringgold adds Sidney Clare to the composing team.) "Changing My Ambitions", with lyrics and music by Pinky Tomlin and Coy Poe, was sung by Tomlin in the film.

=== Filming ===
Filming began in September 1935.

== Release ==
The film was released on January 17, 1936. The official run time was 75–76 minutes.

In the 21st century, Fox reissued Paddy O'Day on its home video label, although the print was not re-mastered.

== Critical reception ==
Contemporary reviews were generally positive.

Variety wrote that the film "is one of the few kid pictures not sticky with sentimental tosh" and that its chief merit "is that the youngster is not permitted to hog the center of the screen until she becomes tiresome." They wrote that with this film, both Jane Withers and Pinky Tomlin had been given material that was superior to their more recent films, and that both had taken advantage of the opportunity, with Withers giving an "intelligent" performance, and Tomlin "gives promise of developing into a good general player." They also noted "Rita Cansino [Hayworth] comes along nicely in this, though she is better known as a dancer than a player."

The Des Moines Register described Paddy O'Day as "one of the grandest laughfests of a year", combining comedy, romance, "some clever situations and good lines". It highlighted the performances of Withers, Tomlin, and Hayworth, as well as George Givot for his "merciless slaying of the English language". The Pittsburgh Sun-Telegraph called the film "unpretentious, yet constantly laughable … Not a strong story, not even an original idea, yet 'Paddy O'Day' has what it takes to keep an audience in high humor practically all of the way".

The San Francisco Examiner wrote that Withers' performance in Paddy O'Day surpassed all she had done to date. Calling her "an exceptionally clever little actress", it explained: "Jane Withers exudes personality. She is a vital, lovable little being, with a malleable face that can be equally tragic or comic". The Pittsburgh Post-Gazette wrote: "Jane is versatile. She uses a County Cork brogue more than an inch thick, then doubles in Russian. She sings, dances, talks with eyes, hands, feet and hair. She is about the personification of expression, all of it done to a purpose, the drawing of a child character that might spring from life. More than anything else, Jane is human: she might be the child that lives down the block.

In 2013, a Turner Classic Movies review upon the film's reissue on home video called it "a charming, sweet film that stops short of being cloying. … The story, as directed by the underrated Lewis Seiler, moves fluidly along and features some clever comic build-ups and gags". It continued, "Withers comes off as a relatable, realistically drawn, enthusiastic, average kid, and that is surely what cemented her appeal in Depression-era America".

== Sources ==
- Bradley, Edwin M. (2016). Unsung Hollywood Musicals of the Golden Era: 50 Overlooked Films and Their Stars, 1929–1939. McFarland. ISBN 978-0-786-49833-8.
- Ringgold, Gene (1980). The films of Rita Hayworth: the legend and career of a love goddess. Citadel Press. ISBN 9780806505749.
- Verswijver, Leo (2003). 'Movies Were Always Magical': Interviews with 19 Actors, Directors, and Producers from the Hollywood of the 1930s through the 1950s. McFarland. ISBN 978-0-786-41129-0.
- Wojcik, Pamela Robinson (2016). Fantasies of Neglect: Imagining the Urban Child in American Film and Fiction. Rutgers University Press. ISBN 978-0-813-56449-4.
