= Little Miss Nobody (1936 film) =

1936 film by John G. Blystone

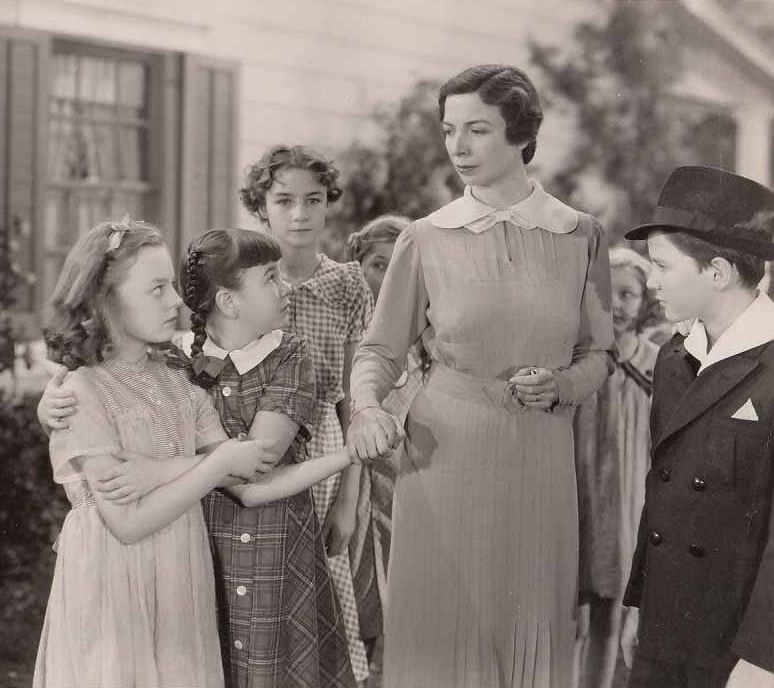
- Jane Withers (2nd left) in a scene from the film
- Directed by: John G. Blystone
- Screenplay by: Lou Breslow; Paul Burger; Edward Eliscu
- Story by: Frederick Hazlitt Brennan
- Produced by: Sol M. Wurtzel
- Starring: Jane Withers; Jane Darwell; Ralph Morgan; Sara Haden; Harry Carey
- Cinematography: Bert Glennon
- Edited by: Alfred DeGaetano
- Music by: Samuel Kaylin
- Production company: 20th Century Fox
- Distributed by: 20th Century Fox
- Release date: June 5, 1936
- Running time: 72 minutes
- Country: United States
- Language: English

Little Miss Nobody is a 1936 American drama film directed by John G. Blystone and written by Lou Breslow, Paul Burger and Edward Eliscu. The film stars Jane Withers, Jane Darwell, Ralph Morgan, Sara Haden, Harry Carey and Betty Jean Hainey. The film was released on June 5, 1936, by 20th Century Fox. The story had previously been filmed in 1929 as Blue Skies.

== Plot ==
Judy Devlin, a spirited young girl living in a rural orphanage, frequently finds herself in trouble and is eventually sent to a reform school. While being transported there, she escapes. After she is recaptured and brought to trial, Judy discovers that the prosecuting attorney is her biological father.

== Cast ==
- Jane Withers as Judy Devlin
- Jane Darwell as Martha Bradley
- Ralph Morgan as Gerald Dexter
- Sara Haden as Teresa Lewis
- Harry Carey as John Russell
- Betty Jean Hainey as Mary Dorsey
- Thomas E. Jackson as Dutch Miller
- Jackie Morrow as Junior Smythe
- Jed Prouty as Hector Smythe
- Claudia Coleman as Sybil Smythe
- Donald Haines as Harold Slade
- Clarence Wilson as Herman Slade
- Lillian Harmer as Jessica Taggert
