= The Arizona Wildcat =

1939 film by Herbert I. Leeds

- Directed by: Herbert I. Leeds
- Written by: Barry Trivers; Jerry Cady
- Based on: An original idea by Frances Hyland and Albert Ray
- Produced by: John Stone
- Starring: Jane Withers; Leo Carrillo; Pauline Moore; William Henry; Henry Wilcoxon; Douglas Fowley; Etienne Girardot
- Cinematography: Lucien Andriot
- Edited by: Fred Allen
- Music by: Sam Kaylin
- Distributed by: 20th Century Fox
- Release date: February 11, 1939
- Running time: 69 minutes
- Country: United States
- Language: English

The Arizona Wildcat is a 1939 American comedy Western film directed by Herbert I. Leeds and starring Leo Carrillo and Jane Withers.

== Plot ==
The orphaned Mary Jane Patterson (Jane Withers) is under the guardianship of Manuel Hernandez (Leo Carrillo), once known as the bandit El Gato, who led a gang of outlaws. Mary Jane wants Hernandez to revive the El Gato gang to rescue the feckless Donald (William "Bill" Henry), the lone survivor of a stage coach robbery engineered by the town's crooked sheriff (Henry Wilcoxon).

It's been a decade since El Gato rode, and Hernandez is now too fat for his bandit costume. Mary Jane aids the rescue by vandalizing the saddles of the sheriff and his posse. When El Gato does rescue Donald, he is arrested. During the ensuing trial, Mary Jane provides special pyrotechnics, and the courtroom is evacuated.

When Mary Jane finds the stash from the stagecoach robbery hidden in the sheriff's office, Hernandez is appointed as the new sheriff.

== Cast ==
- Leo Carrillo – Manuel Hernandez
- Jane Withers – Mary Jane Patterson
- Pauline Moore - Caroline Reed
- William Henry – Donald Clark
- Henry Wilcoxon – Sheriff Richard Baldwin
- Douglas Fowley — Rufe Galloway
- Etienne Girardot — Judge White
