= The Mad Martindales =

1942 film by Alfred L. Werker

- Theatrical release poster
- Directed by: Alfred L. Werker
- Screenplay by: Francis Edward Faragoh
- Based on: Not for Children by Wesley Towner
- Produced by: Walter Morosco
- Starring: Jane Withers; Marjorie Weaver; Alan Mowbray; Jimmy Lydon; Gig Young; George Reeves; Charles Lane
- Cinematography: Lucien N. Andriot
- Edited by: Nick DeMaggio
- Music by: David Buttolph; Cyril J. Mockridge
- Production company: 20th Century Fox
- Distributed by: 20th Century Fox
- Release date: May 15, 1942
- Running time: 65 minutes
- Country: United States
- Language: English

The Mad Martindales is a 1942 American comedy film directed by Alfred L. Werker and written by Francis Edward Faragoh. It is based on the 1939 play Not for Children by Wesley Towner. The film stars Jane Withers, Marjorie Weaver, Alan Mowbray, Jimmy Lydon, Gig Young, George Reeves and Charles Lane. The film was released on May 15, 1942, by 20th Century Fox.

== Cast ==
- Jane Withers as Kathy Martindale
- Marjorie Weaver as Evelyn Martindale
- Alan Mowbray as Hugo Martindale
- Jimmy Lydon as Bobby Bruce Turner
- Gig Young as Peter Varney
- George Reeves as Julio Rigo
- Charles Lane as Virgil Hickling
- Kathleen Howard as Grandmother Varney
- Robert Greig as Wallace Butler
- Brandon Hurst as Smythe Butler
- Steven Geray as Jan Van Der Venne
- Victor Sen Yung as Jefferson Gow
- Emma Dunn as Agnes
- Hal K. Dawson as Hotel clerk
- Don Dillaway as Lawyer
- Tom Yuen as Chang Gow
- Otto Hoffman as Pawnbroker
- Alec Craig as Coachman
- Harry Shannon as Policeman
- Dick French as Barber
- Jack Chefe as Barber
