= Small Town Deb =

1941 film by Harold D. Schuster

- Directed by: Harold Schuster
- Screenplay by: Ethel Hill
- Story by: Jane Withers
- Produced by: Lou L. Ostrow
- Starring: Jane Withers; Jane Darwell; Bruce Edwards; Cobina Wright Jr.; Cecil Kellaway; Katharine Alexander; Jackie Searl; Buddy Pepper
- Cinematography: Virgil Miller
- Edited by: Alexander Troffey
- Music by: Emil Newman; Mack Gordon; Harry Warren
- Production company: 20th Century Fox
- Distributed by: 20th Century Fox
- Release date: November 7, 1941
- Running time: 72 minutes
- Country: United States
- Language: English

Small Town Deb is a 1941 teenage comedy by 20th Century Fox directed by Harold Schuster and starring Jane Withers and Jane Darwell. Withers had a story credit on the film under the pseudonym Jerrie Walters and costumes were made by Herschel McCoy.

== Cast ==
- Jane Withers as Patricia Randall
- Jane Darwell as Katie
- Bruce Edwards as Jack Richards
- Cobina Wright Jr. as Helen Randall
- Cecil Kellaway as Henry Randall
- Katharine Alexander as Mrs. Randall
- Jackie Searl as Tim Randall
- Buddy Pepper as Chauncey Jones
- Margaret Early as Sue Morgan
- Douglas Wood as Eustace R. Richards
- John T. Murray as Mr. Anthony
- Ruth Gillette as Clerk
- Blossom Rock as Beauty Operator (as Marie Blake)
- Jeff Corey as Hector
- Henry Roquemore as Barber
- Edwin Stanley as Mr. Blakely
- Isabel Randolph as Mrs. Jones
- Nora Lane as Customer
- Dorothy Appleby as Dancer
