= Jane Darwell =

American actress (1879–1967)

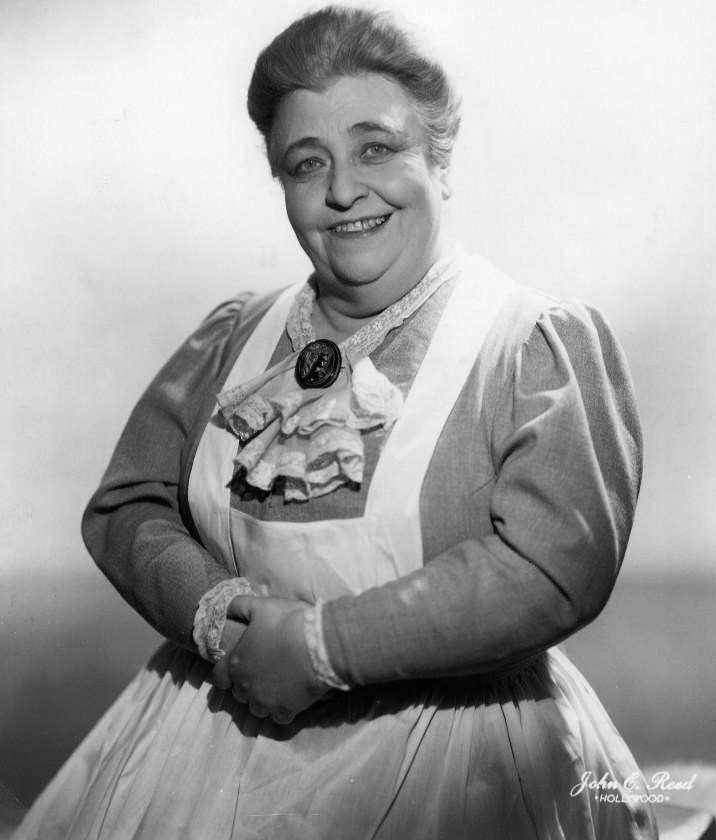
- Darwell in the 1945 play A Doll's House
- Born: Patti Woodard; October 15, 1879; Palmyra, Missouri, U.S.
- Died: August 13, 1967 (aged 87); Los Angeles, California, U.S.
- Occupation: Actress
- Years active: 1909–1964

Jane Darwell (born Patti Woodard; October 15, 1879 – August 13, 1967) was an American actress of stage, film, and television. With appearances in more than 100 major movies spanning half a century, Darwell is perhaps best remembered for her poignant portrayal of the matriarch and leader of the Joad family in the film adaptation of John Steinbeck's The Grapes of Wrath, for which she received the Academy Award for Best Supporting Actress. She has a star on the Hollywood Walk of Fame.

== Early life ==
Born to William Robert Woodard, president of the Louisville Southern Railroad, and Ellen Booth Woodard in Palmyra, Missouri, Darwell originally intended to become a circus rider, then later an opera singer. Her father, however, objected to those career plans, so she compromised by becoming an actress, changing her name to Darwell to avoid sullying the family name.

The Jane Darwell Birthplace was added to the National Register of Historic Places in 1984.

Some sources give Darwell's birth name as Patti Woodward.

== Career ==
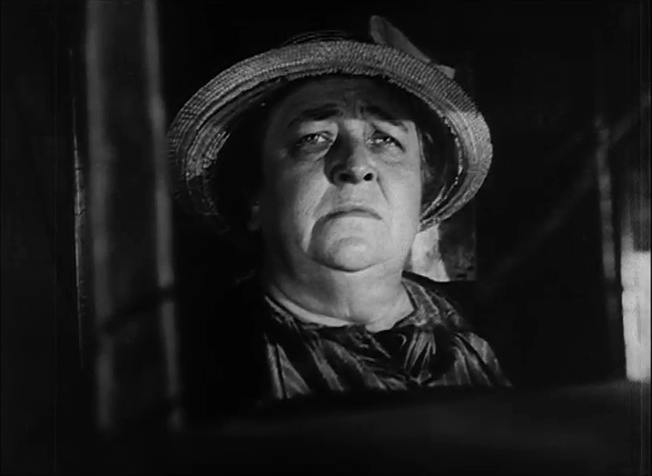
Darwell as Ma Joad in The Grapes of Wrath (1940)

Darwell studied voice culture and the piano, followed by dramatics. At one point, she decided to enter a convent, then changed her mind and became an actress. She began acting in theater productions in Chicago and made her first film appearance in 1913. She appeared in almost 20 films over the next two years, then returned to the stage. After a 15-year absence from films, she appeared in Tom Sawyer (1930), and her career as a Hollywood character actress began. Short, stout and plain, she was quickly cast in a succession of films, usually as the mother of one of the main characters. She also appeared in five Shirley Temple films, usually as the housekeeper or grandmother.

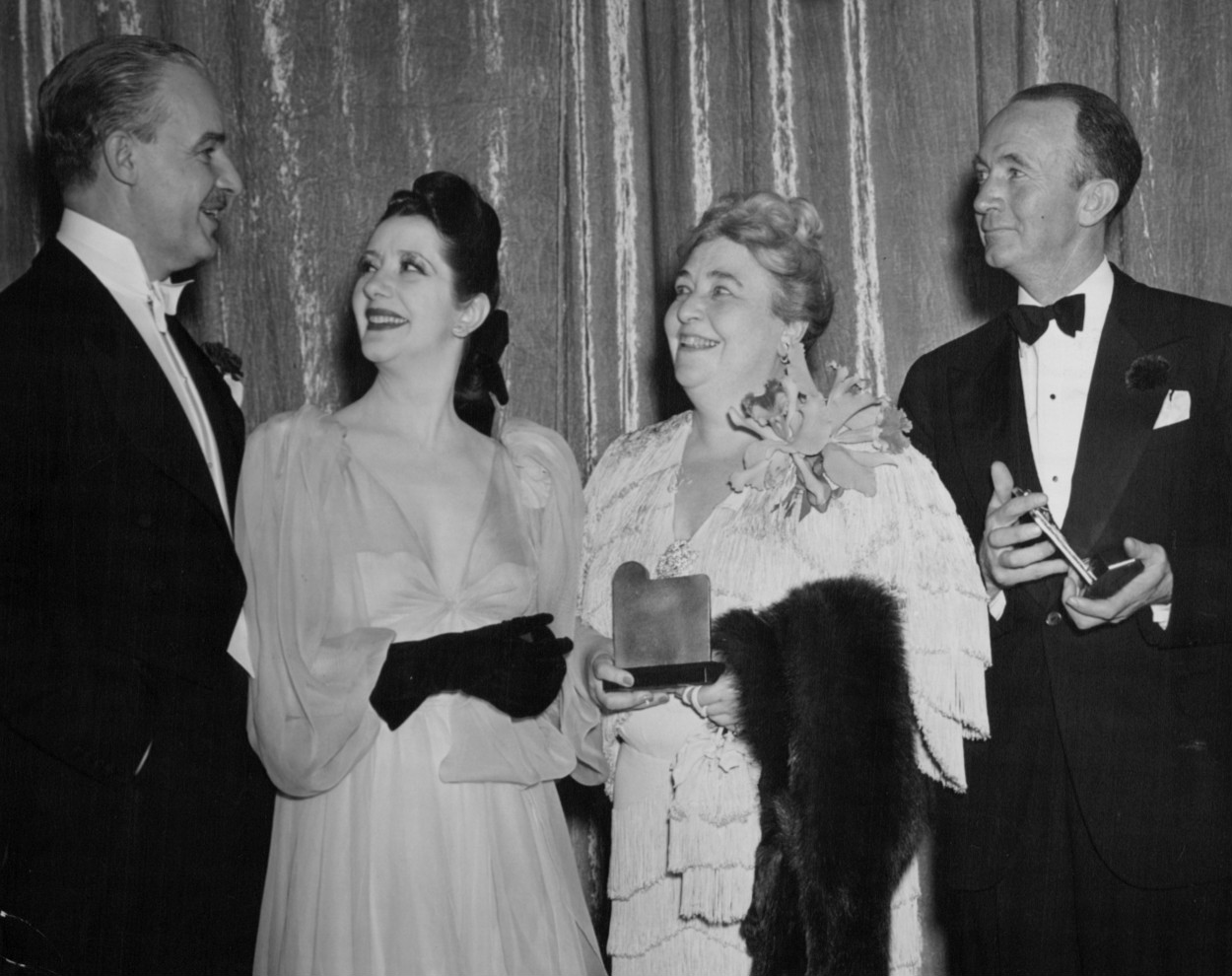
Alfred Lunt and Lynn Fontanne congratulate Darwell and Walter Brennan on their Academy Awards for Best Supporting Actress and Actor, February 28, 1941.

She won an Academy Award for Best Supporting Actress as Ma Joad in The Grapes of Wrath (1940), a role she was given at the insistence of Henry Fonda, the film's star. A contract player with 20th Century Fox, Darwell was memorably cast in The Ox-Bow Incident, and occasionally starred in B movies and played featured parts in scores of major films.

Darwell had noted appearances on the stage as well; in 1944, she was popular in the stage comedy Suds in Your Eye, in which she played an Irishwoman who had inherited a junkyard.

By the end of her career, she had appeared in more than 170 films, including Huckleberry Finn (1931), Jesse James (1939), Gone with the Wind (1939), The Devil and Daniel Webster (1941), The Ox-Bow Incident (1943), and My Darling Clementine (1946).

On the television front, Darwell was among the guest stars on an episode of Faye Emerson's Wonderful Town, a variety series that aired on CBS from 1951 to 1952 in which hostess Faye Emerson visits a different city each week to accent the local music. In 1954, Darwell appeared with Andy Clyde in the episode "Santa's Old Suit" of the series The Pepsi-Cola Playhouse. This same episode was re-run the following Christmas 1955 on Studio 57. In 1959, she appeared with child actor Roger Mobley in the episode "Mr. Rush's Secretary" on Buckskin, starring Tom Nolan and Sally Brophy. That same year she appeared in the TV Western series Wagon Train as “Mrs. Anderson” in the S2E23 episode “The Vivian Carter Story”. She guest starred on John Bromfield's crime drama Sheriff of Cochise.

On July 27, 1961, Darwell appeared as Grandmother McCoy in an episode of the sitcom The Real McCoys. In the story, the series characters played by Walter Brennan, Richard Crenna, and Kathleen Nolan return to fictitious Smokey Corners, West Virginia for Grandmother McCoy's 100th birthday gathering. Darwell was 15 years older than "son" Walter Brennan. Pat Buttram and Henry Jones appeared in this episode as Cousin Carl and Jed McCoy, respectively.

On February 8, 1960, Darwell received a star on the Hollywood Walk of Fame for her contributions to the motion-picture industry; it is located at 6735 Hollywood Boulevard.

In her mid-eighties, Darwell was semi-retired from acting, other than a rare television guest appearance. She had recently moved into the Motion Picture Country Home because of her advanced age and feebleness. When Disney offered her the role of the Bird Woman in Mary Poppins (1964), Darwell declined the role. Walt Disney, still insistent, personally drove to the retirement home to plead with her and she agreed to take the part. But it was her last acting role. In this pivotal scene in the movie, the Bird Woman at the steps of St Paul's Cathedral Square sells bags of bread crumbs to passers-by to feed the pigeons. The "poignant" song "Feed the Birds" was sung by Julie Andrews, as a hymn-like lullaby.

== Death ==
Darwell died on August 13, 1967, at the Motion Picture & Television Country House and Hospital, of a heart attack at the age of 87.

== Partial filmography ==
- Brewster's Millions (1914) as Mrs. Dan De Mille
- The Master Mind (1914) as Milwaukee Sadie
- The Only Son (1914) as Mrs. Brainerd
- The Man on the Box (1914) as Mrs. Chadwick
- Ready Money (1914) as Mrs. Tyler
- Rose of the Rancho (1914) as Senora Castro Kenton / Juanita's Mother
- The Hypocrites (1915) as Madam (uncredited)
- The Goose Girl (1915) as Irma
- After Five (1915) as Mrs. Russell - Aunt Diddy
- The Rug Maker's Daughter (1915) as Mrs. Van Buren
- The Reform Candidate (1915) as Mrs. Haggerty
- Little Church Around the Corner (1923) as Anxious Woman at Mine Disaster (uncredited)
- Tom Sawyer (1930) as Widow Douglas
- Fighting Caravans (1931) as Pioneer Woman (uncredited)
- Huckleberry Finn (1931) as Widow Douglas
- Ladies of the Big House (1931) as Mrs. Turner
- No One Man (1932) as Patient (uncredited)
- Young America (1932) as Schoolteacher (uncredited)
- The Strange Case of Clara Deane (1932) as Mortimer's Wife (uncredited)
- Back Street (1932) as Mrs. Adolph Schmidt
- Washington Merry-Go-Round (1932) as Alice's Aunt (uncredited)
- Hot Saturday (1932) as Mrs Ida Brock
- Women Won't Tell (1932) as Mrs. Walter Robinson
- Air Hostess (1933) as Ma Kearns
- The Past of Mary Holmes (1933)
- Child of Manhattan (1933) as Mrs. McGonegle
- Murders in the Zoo (1933) as Banquet Guest (uncredited)
- Bondage (1933) as Mrs. Elizabeth Wharton
- The Girl in 419 (1933) as Nurse Esmond (uncredited)
- Emergency Call (1933) as Head Nurse Brown (uncredited)
- Jennie Gerhardt (1933) as Boardinghouse Keeper (uncredited)
- Bed of Roses (1933) as Mrs. Webster - Head Prison Matron (uncredited)
- Before Dawn (1933) as Mrs. Marble
- He Couldn't Take It (1933) as Mrs. Case
- One Sunday Afternoon (1933) as Mrs. Lind
- Ann Vickers (1933) as Mrs. Gage (uncredited)
- Aggie Appleby, Maker of Men (1933) as Mrs. Spence - Landlady (uncredited)
- Only Yesterday (1933) as Mrs. Lane
- Design for Living (1933) as Curtis' Housekeeper
- Roman Scandals (1933) as Roman Spa Proprietress (uncredited)
- King for a Night (1933) as Mrs. Williams (uncredited)
- Cross Country Cruise (1934) as Mrs. O'Hara (uncredited)
- Fashions of 1934 (1934) as Customer at Maison Elegance (uncredited)
- Wonder Bar (1934) as Baroness (uncredited)
- Heat Lightning (1934) as Gladys
- David Harum (1934) as Mrs. Woolsey (uncredited)
- Journal of a Crime (1934) as Dinner Guest (uncredited)
- Once to Every Woman (1934) as Mrs. Wood
- Finishing School (1934) as Maude - interns' Receptionist (uncredited)
- The Scarlet Empress (1934) as Miss Cardell, Sophia's Nurse (uncredited)
- Change of Heart (1934) as Mrs. McGowan
- Let's Talk It Over (1934) as Mrs. O'Keefe
- The Most Precious Thing in Life (1934) as Mrs. O'Day
- Blind Date (1934) as Ma Taylor
- Million Dollar Ransom (1934) as Ma McGarry (uncredited)
- Embarrassing Moments (1934) as Mrs. Stuckelberger
- One Night of Love (1934) as Mrs. Barrett - Mary's Mother (uncredited)
- Desirable (1934) as Frederick's Mother (uncredited)
- Wake Up and Dream (1934) as Landlady
- Happiness Ahead (1934) as Mrs. Davis - the Landlady
- Tomorrow's Youth (1934) as Mary O'Brien
- The Firebird (1934) as Mrs. Miller - Apartment House Tenant (uncredited)
- The White Parade (1934) as Miss 'Sailor' Roberts
- Gentlemen Are Born (1934) as Landlady (uncredited)
- Bright Eyes (1934) as Elizabeth Higgins
- One More Spring (1935) as Mrs. Mary Sweeney
- McFadden's Flats (1935) as Nora McFadden
- Life Begins at 40 (1935) as Ida Harris
- Curly Top (1935) as Mrs. Henrietta Denham
- Navy Wife (1935) as Mrs. Louise Keats
- Metropolitan (1935) as Grandma (uncredited)
- We're Only Human (1935) as Mrs. Walsh
- Paddy O'Day (1936) as Dora
- The Country Doctor (1936) as Mrs. Graham
- The First Baby (1936) as Mrs. Ellis
- Captain January (1936) as Mrs. Eliza Croft
- Private Number (1936) as Mrs. Meecham
- Little Miss Nobody (1936) as Martha Bradley
- The Poor Little Rich Girl (1936) as Woodward
- White Fang (1936) as Maud Mahoney
- Star for a Night (1936) as Mrs. Martha Lind
- Ramona (1936) as Aunt Ri Hyar
- Craig's Wife (1936) as Mrs. Harold
- Laughing at Trouble (1936) as Glory Bradford
- Love Is News (1937) as Mrs. Flaherty
- Nancy Steele Is Missing! (1937) as Mrs. Mary Flaherty
- The Great Hospital Mystery (1937) as Miss Sarah Keats
- Fifty Roads to Town (1937) as Mrs. Henry
- Slave Ship (1937) as Mrs. Marlowe
- The Singing Marine (1937) as "Ma" Marine
- Wife, Doctor and Nurse (1937) Mrs. Krueger
- Dangerously Yours (1937) as Aunt Cynthia Barton
- Change of Heart (1938) as Mrs. Thompson
- The Jury's Secret (1938) as Mrs. Sheldon
- Battle of Broadway (1938) as Mrs. Rogers
- Three Blind Mice (1938) as Mrs. Killan
- Little Miss Broadway (1938) as Miss Hutchins
- Time Out for Murder (1938) as Polly - Helen's Supervisor
- Five of a Kind (1938) as Mrs. Waldron
- Up the River (1938) as Mrs. Graham
- Jesse James (1939) as Mrs. Samuels
- Inside Story (1939) as Aunt Mary Perkins
- The Zero Hour (1939) as Sophie
- Unexpected Father (1939) as Mrs. Callahan
- Grand Jury Secrets (1939) as Mrs. Keefe
- The Rains Came (1939) as Aunt Phoebe - Mrs. Smiley
- 20,000 Men a Year (1939) as Mrs. Allen
- Gone with the Wind (1939) as Mrs. Merriwether
- Miracle on Main Street (1939) as Mrs. Herman
- The Grapes of Wrath (1940) as Ma Joad
- Untamed (1940) as Mrs. Maggie Moriarty
- Brigham Young (1940) as Eliza Kent
- Youth Will Be Served (1940) as Supervisor Stormer
- Chad Hanna (1940) as Mrs. Huguenine
- Thieves Fall Out (1941) as Grandma Allen
- Private Nurse (1941) as Miss Adams
- The Devil and Daniel Webster (1941) as Ma Stone
- All Through the Night (1942) as Mrs. 'Ma' Donahue
- Young America (1942) as Grandmother Nora Campbell
- On the Sunny Side (1942) as Annie
- Small Town Deb (1942) as Katie
- It Happened in Flatbush (1942) as Mrs. Maguire
- Men of Texas (1942) as Mrs.Scott aka Aunt Hattie
- The Loves of Edgar Allan Poe (1942) as Mrs. Mariah Clemm
- Highways by Night (1942) as Grandma Fogarty
- The Great Gildersleeve (1942) as Aunt Emma Forrester
- Gildersleeve's Bad Day (1943) as Aunt Emma Forrester
- The Ox-Bow Incident (1943) as Ma Grier
- Stage Door Canteen (1943) as herself
- Government Girl (1943) as Miss Trask (uncredited)
- Tender Comrade (1943) as Mrs. Henderson
- Reckless Age (1944) as Mrs. Connors
- The Impatient Years (1944) as Minister's Wife
- Music in Manhattan (1944) as Mrs. Pearson
- She's a Sweetheart (1944) as Mom
- Sunday Dinner for a Soldier (1944) as Mrs. Helen Dobson
- I Live in Grosvenor Square (1945) as Mrs. Patterson
- Captain Tugboat Annie (1945) as Tugboat Annie
- The Dark Horse (1946) as Aunt Hattie
- Three Wise Fools (1946) as Sister Mary Brigid
- My Darling Clementine (1946) as Kate Nelson
- Keeper of the Bees (1947) as Mrs. Ferris
- The Red Stallion (1947) as Mrs. Aggie Curtis
- Train to Alcatraz (1948) as Aunt Ella
- 3 Godfathers (1948) as Miss Florie
- Red Canyon (1949) as Aunt Jane
- The Daughter of Rosie O'Grady (1950) as Mrs. Murphy
- Wagon Master (1950) as Sister Ledyard
- Caged (1950) as Isolation Matron
- Surrender (1950) as Molly Hale
- Redwood Forest Trail (1950) as Hattie Hickory
- Three Husbands (1950) as Mrs. Wurdeman
- The Second Face (1950) as Mrs. Lockridge
- Father's Wild Game (1950) as Minverva Bobbin
- The Lemon Drop Kid (1951) as Nellie Thursday
- Excuse My Dust (1951) as Mrs. Belden
- Journey into Light (1951) as Mack
- We're Not Married! (1952) as Mrs. Bush
- The Sun Shines Bright (1953) as Mrs. Aurora Ratchitt
- It Happens Every Thursday (1953) as Mrs. Eva Spatch
- Affair with a Stranger (1953) as Ma Stanton
- The Bigamist (1953) as Mrs. Connelley
- Hit the Deck (1955) as Jenny
- There's Always Tomorrow (1955) as Mrs. Rogers
- A Life at Stake (1955) as Landlady
- Girls in Prison (1956) as Matron Jamieson
- The Last Hurrah (1958) as Delia Boylan
- Hound-Dog Man (1959) as Grandma Wilson
- New Comedy Showcase (1960) (Season 1 Episode 1: "You're Only Young Twice") as Olga
- The Alfred Hitchcock Hour (1964) (Season 2 Episode 17: "The Jar") as Granny Carnation
- Mary Poppins (1964) as The Bird Woman (final film role)

== See also ==
- List of actors with Academy Award nominations
