= Wild and Woolly (1937 film) =

1937 film

- Theatrical release poster
- Directed by: Alfred L. Werker
- Screenplay by: Frank Fenton; Lynn Root
- Story by: Frank Fenton
- Produced by: John Stone
- Starring: Jane Withers; Walter Brennan; Pauline Moore; Carl Switzer; Jackie Searl; Berton Churchill; Douglas Fowley; Robert Wilcox; Douglas Scott
- Cinematography: Harry Jackson
- Edited by: Alfred DeGaetano
- Production company: 20th Century Fox
- Distributed by: 20th Century Fox
- Release date: July 19, 1937
- Running time: 65 minutes
- Country: United States
- Language: English

Wild and Woolly is a 1937 American Western comedy film directed by Alfred L. Werker and written by Frank Fenton and Lynn Root. The film stars Jane Withers, Walter Brennan, Pauline Moore, Carl Switzer, Jackie Searl and Berton Churchill. The film was released on July 19, 1937, by 20th Century Fox.

== Plot ==
Arnette Flynn's town is having its fifteenth year celebration, however in the background a criminal gang is planning a bank robbery while people are distracted celebrating.

== Cast ==
- Jane Withers as Arnette Flynn
- Walter Brennan as Gramp 'Hercules' Flynn
- Pauline Moore as Ruth Morris
- Carl Switzer as Zero
- Jackie Searl as Chaunce Ralston
- Berton Churchill as Edward Ralston
- Douglas Fowley as Blackie Morgan
- Robert Wilcox as Frank Bailey
- Douglas Scott as Leon Wakefield
- Lon Chaney Jr. as Dutch
- Frank Melton as Barton Henshaw
- Syd Saylor as Lutz

== Critical reception ==
Variety described the film as "a lively, well produced western, cast with some first class character actors." The reviewer commended the director for restraining "the precocious Jane Withers [who] has been somewhat trying on the nerves of grownups ... she turns in a good piece of work" and stated that Carl Switzer "steals the show."

Modern Screen’s Leo Townsend wrote that Jane Withers could rightfully claim the adjectives in the film title as her own, and that "this is her best job to date, because an astute director has seen to it that Jane's repertoire of tricks is not too obviously cute, so she emerges a likable, if roisterous, youngster." Townsend concluded, "If you like a good homespun tale for a change, you’ll not go wrong on this picture."
