= My Best Gal =

1944 film by Anthony Mann

- Theatrical release poster
- Directed by: Anthony Mann
- Screenplay by: Olive Cooper; Earl Felton
- Story by: Richard Brooks
- Produced by: Harry Grey
- Starring: Jane Withers; Jimmy Lydon; Frank Craven; Fortunio Bonanova; Franklin Pangborn
- Cinematography: Jack A. Marta
- Edited by: Ralph Dixon
- Music by: Marlin Skiles
- Production company: Republic Pictures
- Distributed by: Republic Pictures
- Release date: March 28, 1944
- Running time: 67 minutes
- Country: United States
- Language: English

My Best Gal is a 1944 American comedy film directed by Anthony Mann and written by Olive Cooper and Earl Felton. The film stars Jane Withers, Jimmy Lydon, Frank Craven, Fortunio Bonanova, George Cleveland and Franklin Pangborn. The film was released on March 28, 1944, by Republic Pictures.

== Plot ==
Kitty O'Hara has a good singing voice but will have nothing to do with trying to use it in the theatre or on the radio. She and her grandfather, Danny O'Hara, an ex-vaudeville hoofer, work in a Broadway drug store, rendezvous with young aspiring actors and performers, Danny and his friend Johnny McCloud, writer of musicals, conspire to have Kitty's voice auditioned by radio man Harry Gage. Her anger at discovering she's been tricked subsides when Johnny's induction notice into the U.S. Army arrives, and she tries to interest Broadway producer Ralph Hodges in Johnny's musical show. The show is performed for Hodges, using the talents of young unknown performers, and Hodges wants to buy it, but without the youthful talent. Johnny rejects the offer until Danny becomes ill and needs an expensive operation, which Johnny secretly uses the money from selling his show to Hodges. Kitty and his friends think Johnny has betrayed them. She later learned that this is not the case and Kitty and Johnny later put on the show at the Army base where Johnny has been stationed.

== Cast ==
- Jane Withers as Kitty O'Hara
- Jimmy Lydon as Johnny McCloud
- Frank Craven as Danny O'Hara
- Fortunio Bonanova as Charlie
- George Cleveland as Ralph Hodges
- Franklin Pangborn as Mr. Porter
- Mary Newton as Miss Simpson
- Jack Boyle as Freddy
- Charles Irwin as Harry Gage
