= Always in Trouble =

1938 film by Joseph Santley

- Theatrical release poster
- Directed by: Joseph Santley
- Screenplay by: Robert Chapin; Karen DeWolf
- Story by: Jefferson Moffitt; Albert Treynor
- Produced by: John Stone
- Starring: Jane Withers; Jean Rogers; Arthur Treacher; Robert Kellard; Eddie Collins; Andrew Tombes; Nana Bryant; Joan Woodbury
- Cinematography: Lucien N. Andriot
- Edited by: Nick DeMaggio
- Production company: 20th Century-Fox
- Distributed by: 20th Century-Fox
- Release date: October 28, 1938
- Running time: 70 minutes
- Country: United States
- Language: English

Always in Trouble is a 1938 American comedy film directed by Joseph Santley, and written by Robert Chapin and Karen DeWolf. The film stars Jane Withers, Jean Rogers, Arthur Treacher, Robert Kellard, Eddie Collins and Andrew Tombes. The film was released on October 28, 1938, by 20th Century-Fox.

== Plot ==
Geraldine "Jerry" Darlington felt happier before her father J.C. struck it rich in the oil business and moved the family to Florida. She's irritated by her dad no longer working and her beautiful sister Virginia being pursued by men interested more by her money.

A meek clerk from her dad's office, Pete Graham, is persuaded by Jerry to steer the family's boat. He accidentally runs the vessel aground and ends up falsely suspected of knocking J.C. unconscious and kidnapping the Darlingtons for ransom. Jerry amuses herself at first by not supporting Pete's story, but when real crooks get involved, Pete is able to clear his name and persuade Virginia he's sincere about his attraction to her.

== Cast ==
- Jane Withers as Jerry Darlington
- Jean Rogers as Virginia Darlington
- Arthur Treacher as Rogers
- Robert Kellard as Pete Graham
- Eddie Collins as Uncle Ed Darlington
- Andrew Tombes as J. C. Darlington
- Nana Bryant as Mrs. Minnie Darlington
- Joan Woodbury as Pearl Mussendorfer
- Joe Sawyer as Buster Mussendorfer
- Charles Lane as Donald Gower
- Pat Flaherty as Gideon Stubbs
