= Jane Withers =

American actress and hostess (1926–2021)

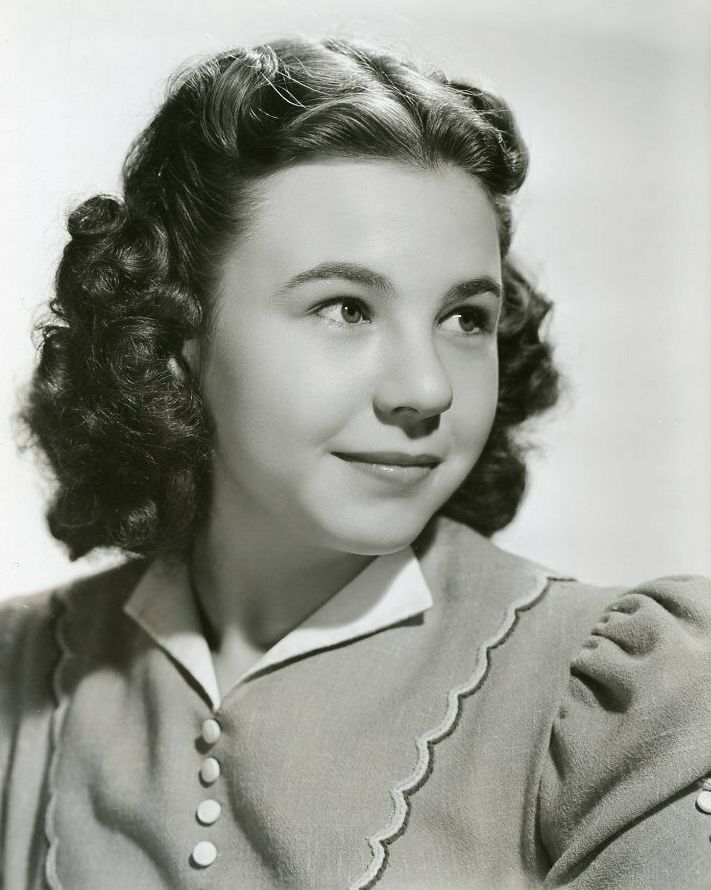
- 20th Century Fox studio portrait, 1930s
- Born: April 12, 1926; Atlanta, Georgia, U.S.
- Died: August 7, 2021 (aged 95); Burbank, California, U.S.
- Occupations: Actress; radio-show host
- Years active: 1929–2002
- Spouses: William P. Moss Jr. (m. 1947; div. 1954) Kenneth Errair (m. 1955; died 1968)
- Children: 5
- Awards: Young Artist Former Child Star Lifetime Achievement Award

Jane Withers (April 12, 1926 – August 7, 2021) was an American actress and children's radio show hostess. She became one of the most popular child stars in Hollywood in the 1930s and early 1940s, with her films ranking in the top ten list for box-office gross in 1937 and 1938.

She began her entertainment career at the age of three and, during the Golden Age of Radio, hosted her own children's radio program in her home city of Atlanta, Georgia. In 1932, she and her mother moved to Hollywood, where she appeared as an extra in many films until landing her breakthrough role as the spoiled, obnoxious Joy Smythe opposite Shirley Temple's angelic orphan Shirley Blake in the 1934 film Bright Eyes. She made 38 films before retiring at age 21 in 1947. She returned to film and television as a character actor in the 1950s. From 1963 to 1974, she portrayed the character Josephine the Plumber in a series of television commercials for Comet cleanser. In the 1990s and early 2000s, she did voice work for Disney animated films. She was interviewed in numerous documentary retrospectives of the Golden Age of Hollywood. She was also known for her philanthropy and her extensive doll collection.

== Early life ==
Jane Withers was born on April 12, 1926, in Atlanta, Georgia, the only child of Walter Edward Withers and Lavinia Ruth (née Elble) Withers. Ruth had had her own aspirations to be an actress denied by her parents. She determined before Jane was born that she would have one daughter who would go into show business, and chose the name Jane so that "even with a long last name like Withers, it would fit on a marquee". Ruth taught Sunday school and Walter taught Bible classes in their local Presbyterian church. The family recited blessings at mealtime and devoted themselves to charitable works, which stayed with Jane her entire life. Both in Atlanta and in Hollywood, the family would invite "six busloads of orphan children" to come to their home after church and Sunday school for lunch and afternoon entertainment.

When Jane was two, Ruth enrolled her in a tap dance school, and also taught her to sing. Jane launched her entertainment career at the age of three after winning a local amateur contest called Dixie's Dainty Dewdrop. She was cast on Aunt Sally's Kiddie Revue, a Saturday-morning children's program broadcast on WGST radio in Atlanta, in which she sang, danced, and did impersonations of film stars such as W. C. Fields, ZaSu Pitts, Maurice Chevalier, Fanny Brice, Eddie Cantor, and Greta Garbo. At age 3½ she had her own radio show called Dixie's Dainty Dewdrop, where she also interviewed celebrities who were visiting Atlanta.

=== Move to Hollywood ===
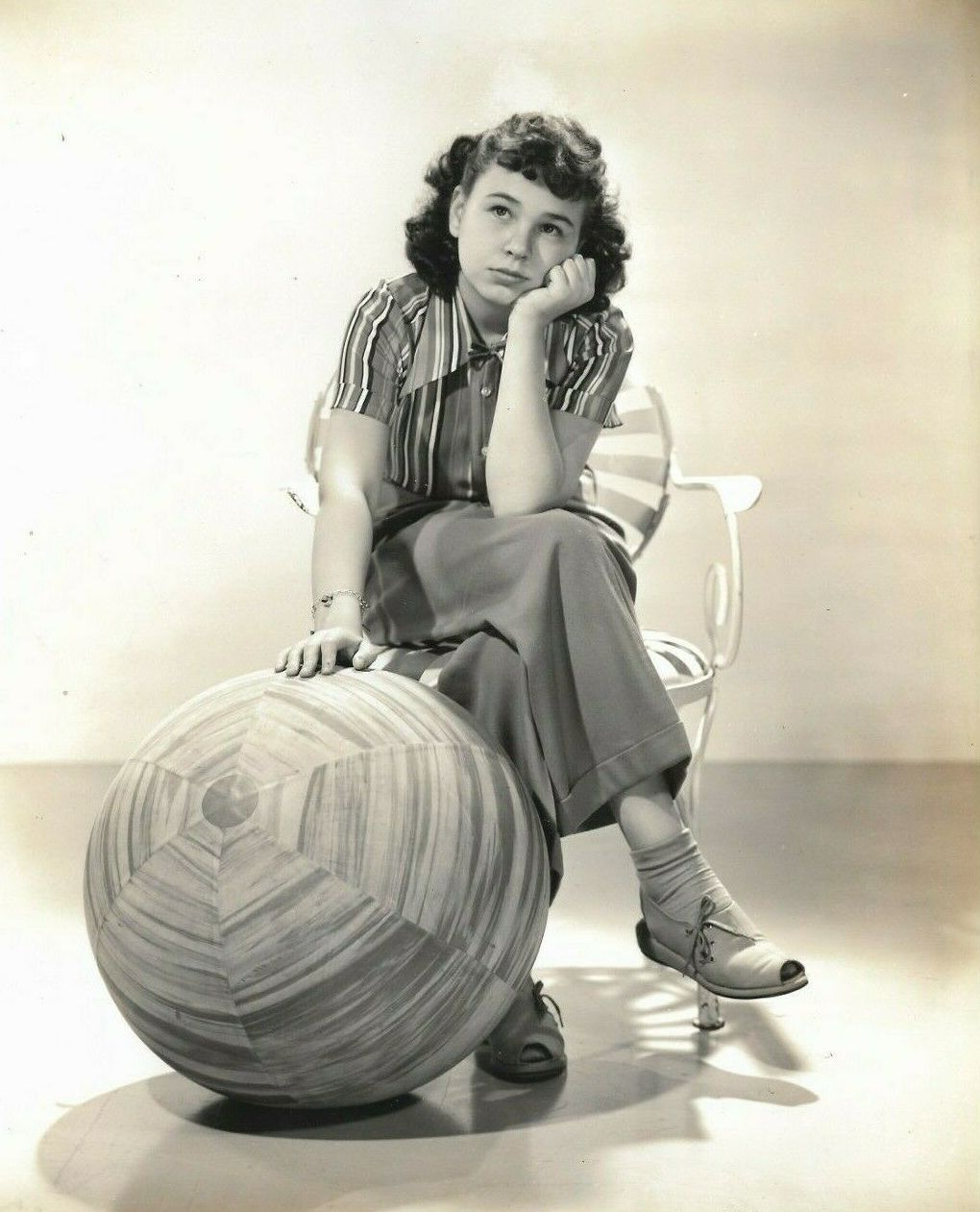
Jane Withers, 1930s

After two years of her radio work, Ruth took Jane to Hollywood before her sixth birthday in 1932 to explore opportunities in film. Walter remained in Atlanta, sending them $100 a month on which to live. In Los Angeles, Jane performed on children's shows on KFWB radio, did cartoon voice-overs, and also modeled. She got her first film role as an extra when their neighbor invited her to come along for her daughter's interview for Handle with Care (1932). Withers stood to the side while the other children interviewed with director David Butler. The assistant director came over and asked her why she was not standing with the others. "Sir, I was not invited to the interview. I came with our friends", she replied. The assistant director told her that Butler had seen her and wanted her to interview as well. Handle with Care was Withers's first film appearance, though she and all the children were photographed with their backs to the camera.

Withers subsequently appeared in many films as an uncredited extra, though occasionally she had a line of dialogue. She stood out from the other girls at auditions because of her appearance: she had a Dutchboy bob and preferred tailored clothes to frilly dresses. "Every interview I ever went on I was the only one with a tailored dress, with straight bangs and straight haircut, and no curls and no frills", she recalled. Butler was the first to notice this about her. He told her, "You're different than any other kid that I've ever seen in Hollywood. You've got a special quality and someday you are going to be a famous little star".

Withers was working as an extra on It's a Gift (1934), when W. C. Fields selected her from a group of juvenile extras to do a pantomime hopscotch scene with him. Afterwards, he praised her timing and called over her mother to compliment her on Jane's talent and predict that she would go far.

Withers's big break came two years after she started working as an extra, when she landed a supporting role in the Shirley Temple film Bright Eyes (also 1934), also directed by Butler. On her interview, Butler asked her if she could imitate a machine gun, and she gave it a try. She also charmed the casting director with her impersonations. Her character, Joy Smythe, is spoiled and obnoxious, a perfect foil for Temple's sweet personality. Withers was concerned that filmgoers would hate her for being so mean to Temple, but the film was a box-office hit. Withers said that director Butler confided to her, "You stole the picture".

Former child star Dickie Moore, in his memoir, wrote that Gertrude Temple was very protective of Shirley. While performing together in the film Bright Eyes with Shirley, Jane was prohibited from speaking to Shirley except in character.

After filming wrapped, Withers signed a seven-year contract with Fox Film Corporation. Included in her contract was the right to choose the crew members who would work on her productions. Her crew, dubbed the "Withers Family", worked on all her subsequent films.

After Withers signed her contract with Fox, her mother invested $10,000 into developing additional skills to improve her versatility as an actress, with the intention of spending $20,000 over an eight-year period. This included "ice skating lessons, voice training, horsemanship, dancing, French, Spanish, and swimming lessons".

== Child stardom ==
I never had a [acting] lesson in my life. All you have to do is read and think and do. You read the script, think about it, make notes if you're not sure, try it different ways until it feels natural. I don't know any other way".

— Jane Withers, 2013

Withers began filming her first starring vehicle, Ginger (1935), on her ninth birthday. She received two baskets of flowers on the set that day—one from Fields, to whom she had written about her casting in Bright Eyes, and one from President Franklin D. Roosevelt, who had seen her impersonate him on a newsreel. The same year, she appeared in a brief role in The Farmer Takes a Wife and then starred in This Is the Life. Her day of filming in The Farmer Takes a Wife coincided with Henry Fonda's screen debut, and noticing his nervousness, she encouraged him and offered a prayer for his success.

Throughout the remainder of the 1930s, Withers appeared in three to five films per year. In 1936, she starred in Paddy O'Day, Gentle Julia, Little Miss Nobody, and Pepper. In 1937, she performed in comedies, dramas, and a Western with lead roles in The Holy Terror, Angel's Holiday, Wild and Woolly, Can This Be Dixie?, 45 Fathers, and Checkers. In 1938, she filmed three comedies for Fox: Rascals, Keep Smiling, and Always in Trouble. In 1939 she appeared in four more comedy roles: The Arizona Wildcat, Boy Friend, Chicken Wagon Family, and Pack Up Your Troubles. Withers often received top billing even over other established stars.

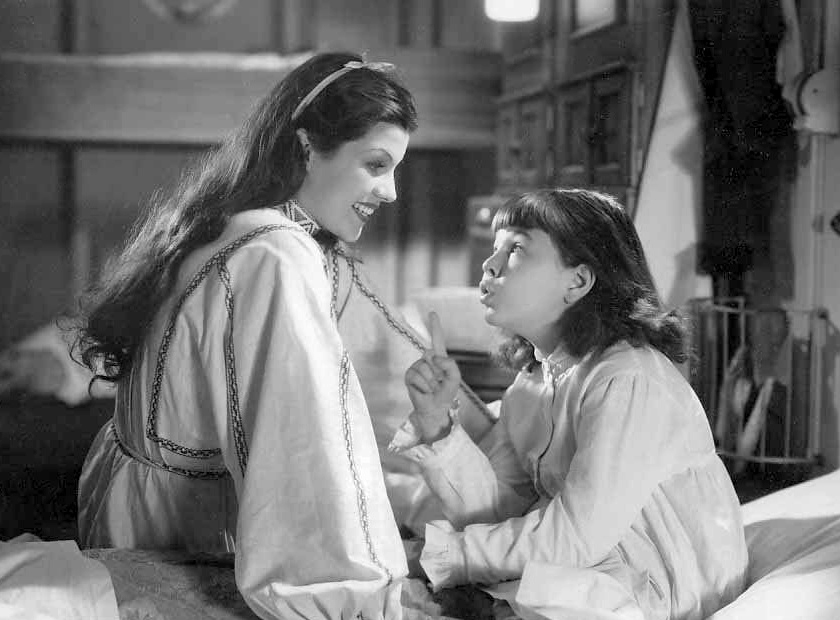
Rita Hayworth and Withers in Paddy O'Day (1936)

Withers did not memorize her lines verbatim, but tried to think about them and draw out the "sense" from them; she often ad-libbed when she lost her way in a scene. A natural mimic, she did impersonations of film celebrities both on and off the set. Twentieth Century Fox studio head Darryl Zanuck reportedly forbade her from doing her Shirley Temple impersonation in public.

Withers freely gave her input to screenwriters and directors. From a young age, she sat in on writers' conferences to suggest changes in dialogue that would be more appropriate for a child to say. She also suggested the casting of other actors for her films, including Jackie Searl, whom she had met at auditions, and 16-year-old Rita Cansino (later renamed Rita Hayworth), whom she had observed dancing on an adjoining sound stage and recommended for a supporting role in Paddy O'Day. At age 13, she took the initiative to make a film with Gene Autry by acting as a go-between between 20th Century Fox studio head Joseph M. Schenck and Republic Pictures head Herbert J. Yates. Though neither studio was willing to loan their star player to the other, Withers suggested that Fox send three other contract players to Republic Pictures in exchange for Autry, who was paid $25,000 to co-star with Withers in Shooting High (1940).

Withers was the only child star to complete a seven-year contract. Studio contracts generally included a series of six-month option periods when the studio could terminate the agreement should the actor's films stop making money. Since all but one of her films were low-budget B movies, the studio held Withers to a lower standard than an A-movie actor whose films would cost the studio much more money. Additionally, the lower rental fees for Withers's B movies allowed her films to be screened in many more small theaters, expanding Withers's popularity. In 1937 and 1938, Withers's films made the top 10 list in box-office gross receipts. In addition to her studio contract, Withers made personal appearance tours for which she received $5,000 a week.

== Teen years ==
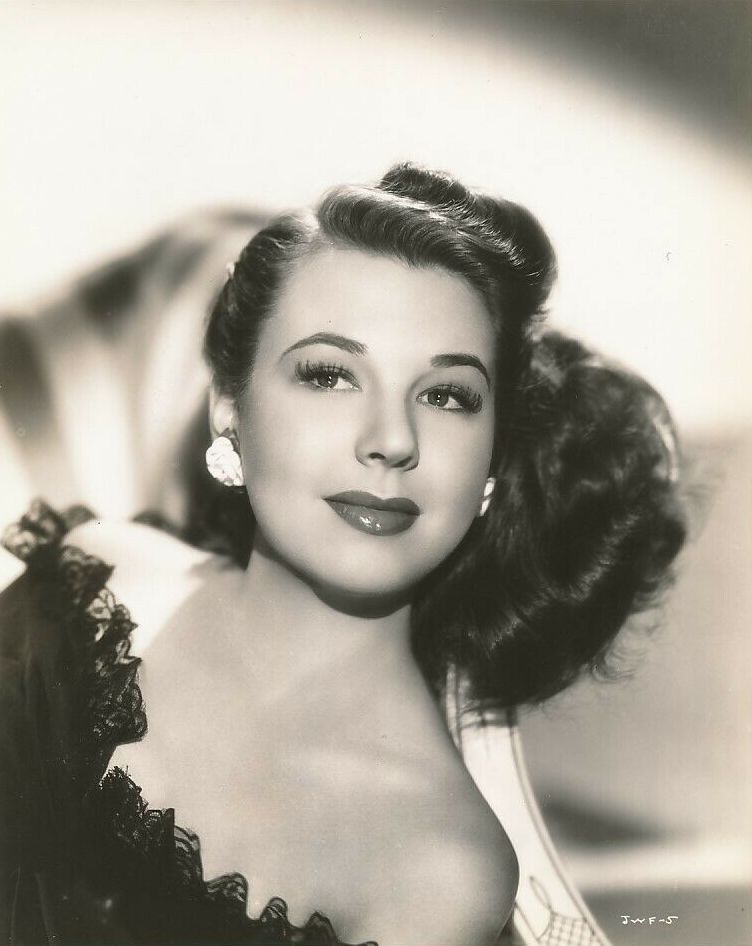
Glamor portrait, 1940s

In 1938–1939, Withers shed her childhood pudginess through healthy eating and stretching exercises, slimming down to 100 lb (45 kg) and a size-12 dress. She had her first screen kiss in the 1939 film Boy Friend. In 1940 she filmed Shooting High with co-star Gene Autry, and starred in the teen films High School, The Girl from Avenue A, and Youth Will Be Served. But she and her fans grew dissatisfied with the juvenile roles being offered her as she matured. Under the pseudonym Jerrie Walters, Withers wrote the screenplay for Small Town Deb (1941), in which she also starred. Withers explained in a 2003 interview that "her own experiences of not being allowed by the studio to grow up were translated into the story of a teenage girl whose 'mother isn't allowing her to grow up, to be herself and to find herself'". As payment for the script, Withers requested that the studio provide fifteen $1,500 scholarships for children to study music and acting, and two upright pianos, for her Sunday school groups.

In 1941, Withers signed her second seven-year contract with 20th Century Fox. She was set to earn $2,750 a week in the first year of the contract and $3,000 per week in the second year. Her other films this year for 20th Century Fox were comedies: Golden Hoofs and A Very Young Lady. Her last films for Fox were the war drama Young America and the comedy film The Mad Martindales, both in 1942. She also made Her First Beau (1941) for Columbia Pictures.

In 1942, Withers signed a three-year, $225,000 contract with Republic Pictures. Her Republic films were Johnny Doughboy (1942), My Best Gal and Faces in the Fog (both 1944), and Affairs of Geraldine (1946). Her other films in the 1940s were The North Star (1943) for RKO Pictures and Danger Street (1947) for Paramount Pictures.

== Screen persona ==
She endeared herself to audiences with her seemingly limitless energy and impish charm.

— Leonard Maltin

Withers and Shirley Temple were the two most popular child stars signed to 20th Century Fox in the 1930s. In contrast to Temple's cute and charming characters, Withers was usually cast as a mischievous little girl or "a tomboy rascal", leading to her being described as "America's favorite problem child". Zierold noted that Withers's characters are "often in trouble, or 'fixes', and prone to brawls". Hollywood gossip columnist Louella Parsons described Withers as "a natural clown". As a child, Withers's "stocky and sturdy" build and straight black hair also contrasted with Temple's "pudgy but delicate" figure and blonde ringlets. Both Withers and Temple usually played orphans and had a transformative effect on those around them. But while Temple was cared for by father figures, Withers was usually under the protection of uncles, both real and imaginary; according to Pamela Wojcik, author of Fantasies of Neglect: Imagining the Urban Child in American Film and Fiction, this introduced the narrative of queerness through alternative family structures.

Withers's bratty screen persona continued into her teens. According to Farley Granger, Withers was "cast as the obnoxious, smart-aleck teen as opposed to Deanna Durbin's or Judy Garland's plucky and adorable adolescent".

== Parents and home life ==
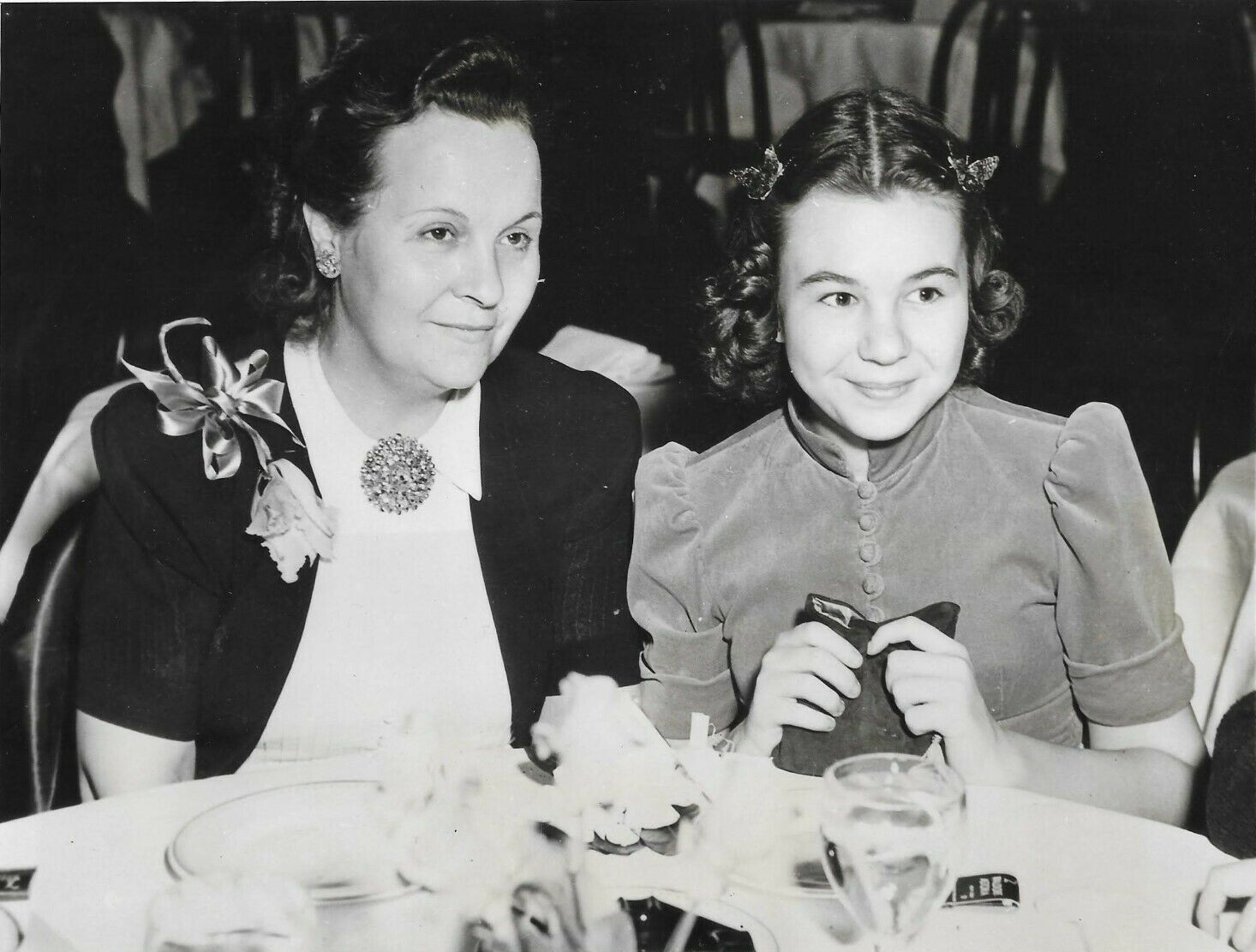
Jane and her mother in April 1939

While Withers typically played a brat onscreen, off-screen she was said to be "one of Hollywood's most charming and well-behaved juveniles". Her parents closely supervised her upbringing to make sure she did not grow up spoiled or entitled. In a 1942 newspaper article, Ruth described how she and her husband encouraged Jane to develop a generous personality and avoid the egotism and self-centeredness that a child star might accrue as the object of adoring fans and studio "sycophants".

For example, as Withers began to receive gifts of dolls from fans to add to her collection, her parents insisted that for every two dolls she received, she give away one to a needy child. When she began to purchase dolls to build the collection further, her parents mandated that she should use her allowance money to buy duplicate dolls for less fortunate children. Her earnings from film roles were invested in trust funds and annuities; Withers had to use her allowance money to buy things she wanted for herself, which often meant saving up for weeks. In 1938, her allowance was reported as $5 a week; this was raised to $10 a week in 1941.

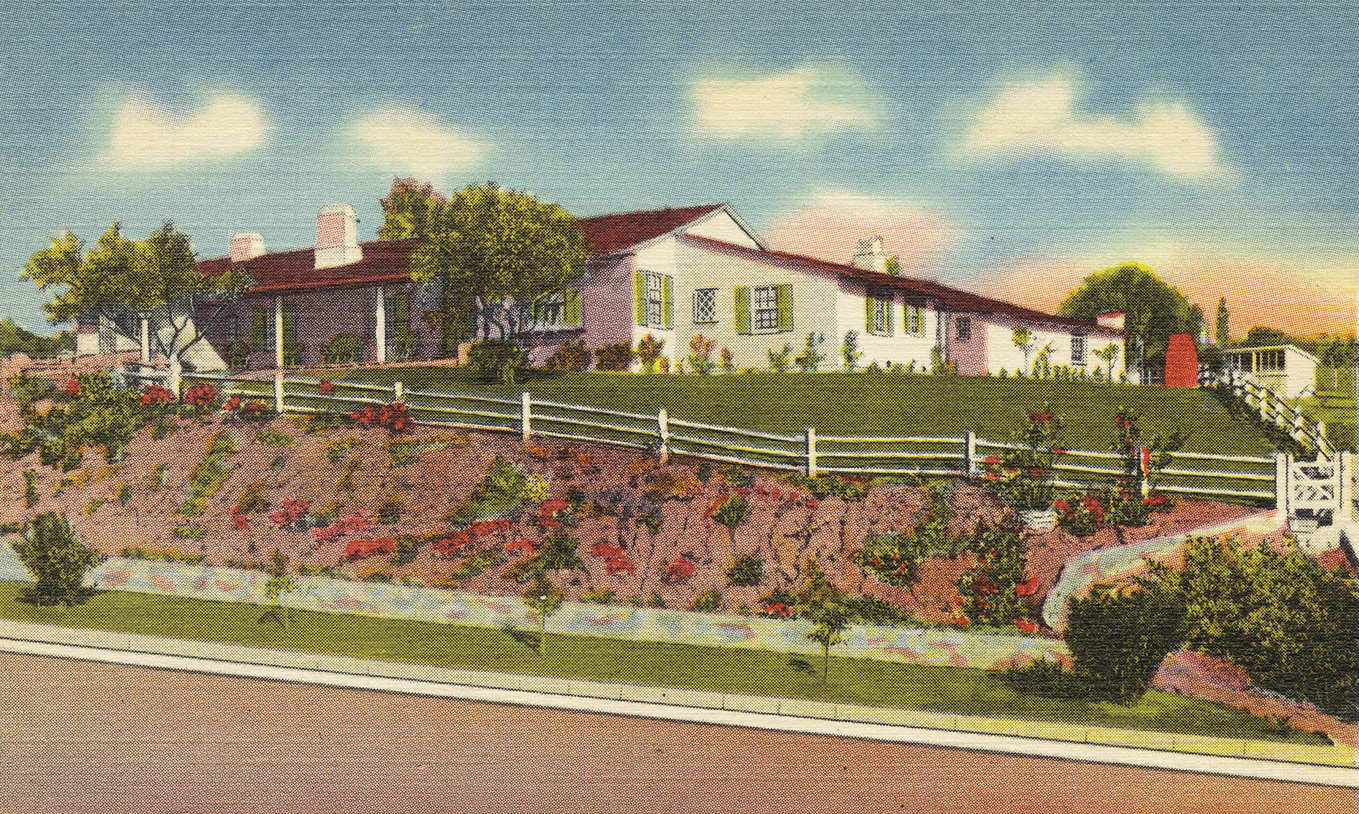
Postcard view of the Withers home, 1930–1945

To ease the pressured life of a child star, Withers's parents made sure she also had fun, but kept her activities supervised and close to home. Withers joined the Girl Scouts and her parents hosted the meeting in their home. The Withers's home, a 4-acre (1.6 ha) model home at 10731 Sunset Boulevard they bought in 1936, was equipped with a swimming pool, badminton court, and a 78 ft (24 m)-long playroom that saw frequent use by Withers and her fellow Hollywood child actors. Her afternoon swim parties continued into her teens and were the subject of many a fan magazine. When she became a teenager, her parents built a second-floor addition that included a beauty salon and soda fountain where Withers could entertain her friends. As a child, she also accumulated a menagerie of two horses, three kittens, "eight turtles, three baby alligators, 24 white Leghorn chickens, 12 turkeys, 2 Chinese hens", a rooster, six bantams, two ducks, seven frogs, and six dogs. At the family's cabin in Lake Arrowhead, where they vacationed on weekends and holidays, Withers had two motorbikes and a boat.

Withers's birthday parties, described as "the social event of the season for movietown's small fry", were annually covered by the media. For her twelfth birthday, her parents hired a 21-seat cargo plane for $18,000 to give party guests a low-altitude ride. Withers's thirteenth birthday party saw 60 young guests come in costume and participate in a balloon dance and jitterbug contest; this party earned a two-page pictorial spread in Life magazine. Withers's "sweet sixteen" party in 1942, with 150 invited guests and a hayride and barn dance on the program, was filmed by Paramount Pictures for the Hedda Hopper's Hollywood series. The short was transferred to 16 mm film for viewing by U.S. troops overseas during World War II. Withers had her eighteenth birthday party at Madison Square Garden with a circus theme and invited U.S. servicemen and their dates to be her guests. Her twenty-first birthday party was planned for a nightclub with 200 guests, but after she came down with the flu, Withers instead served cake and ice cream and watched movies in her personal suite at home with 12 close friends.

Withers was allowed to go on chaperoned dates with boys of her age in her early teens; by age 16 she was permitted to go on solo dates. After a 1936 kidnapping threat, she was always accompanied by round-the-clock bodyguards.

During Withers's first 15 years in film, Ruth "handled all negotiations with producers, supervised publicity, [and] completely managed Jane's off-screen life". However, Ruth was not a typical stage mother. She was usually present on the sound stage but did not watch Jane film her scenes; nor did she ever issue instructions or objections to studio personnel. Walter Withers did not involve himself in the movie business at all, but worked as a representative for a California wholesale furniture company.

== Product licensing ==
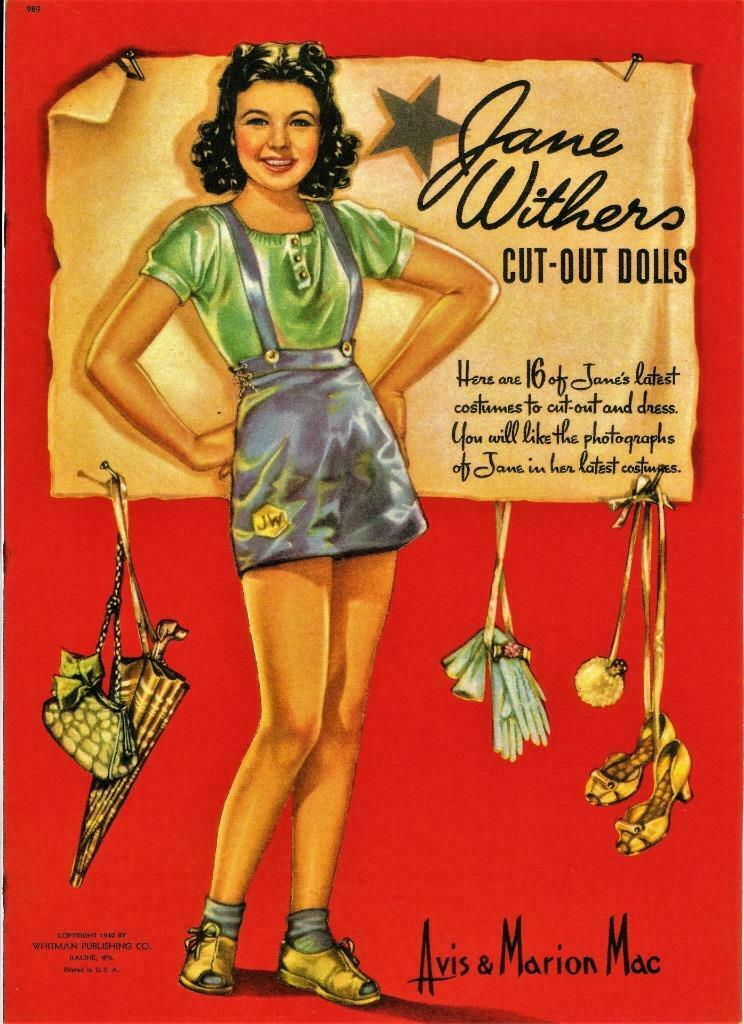
Cover of 1940 paper doll book featuring Withers

Withers's parents licensed her name and image to numerous product lines. As early as 1936, her name was affixed to a line of "Jane Withers Dresses" for girls, and girls' handbags and jewelry were also branded with her name. She was the star of best-selling paper doll books issued by Whitman Publishing, Saalfield Publishing, and Dell in the late 1930s and 1940s, which later became popular collectables. She was also featured in several Big Little Books published by Whitman Publishing. Numerous dolls were made in her likeness, including four Madame Alexander dolls in 1937 ranging in height from 13.5–20 in (340–510 mm).

In the 1940s, Withers was featured as the heroine of three mystery novels published by Whitman Publishing, which produced 16 authorized editions featuring notable film actresses of that era. The books Jane Withers and the Hidden Room (1942) by Eleanor Packer and Jane Withers and the Phantom Violin (1943) by Roy J. Snell "featured a character who looked like Jane Withers and was named Jane Withers but was not Jane Withers". Jane Withers and the Swamp Wizard (1944) by Kathryn Heisenfelt was said to "star some version of the real Jane Withers". The books were reprinted by Literary Licensing in the 21st century.

== Retirement at age 21 ==
In the early 1940s, Hollywood's child-star genre that had catapulted Withers to fame was on the decline. Her popularity in comedy films also hindered her acceptance as a dramatic actress in films such as The North Star (1943). Withers retired from film at age 21 in 1947, shortly after completing Danger Street (1947) and nine days before her marriage to William P. Moss Jr., a Texas entrepreneur and film producer. She had starred in 38 films.

A month after Jane's twenty-first birthday, her mother Ruth appeared in a California Superior Court and listed her daughter's assets as $40,401.85 (equivalent to $440,000 in 2024). The judge turned the property over to Jane's control. The same month, her parents turned over to her the deed to their home, valued at $250,000 (equivalent to $2.7 million in 2024), and other real estate worth $75,000, plus annuities totaling $10,000, all purchased from Withers's earnings.

Her father died the following year. Ruth remarried to Louis D. Boonshaft, a physician.

== Return to the screen and television work ==
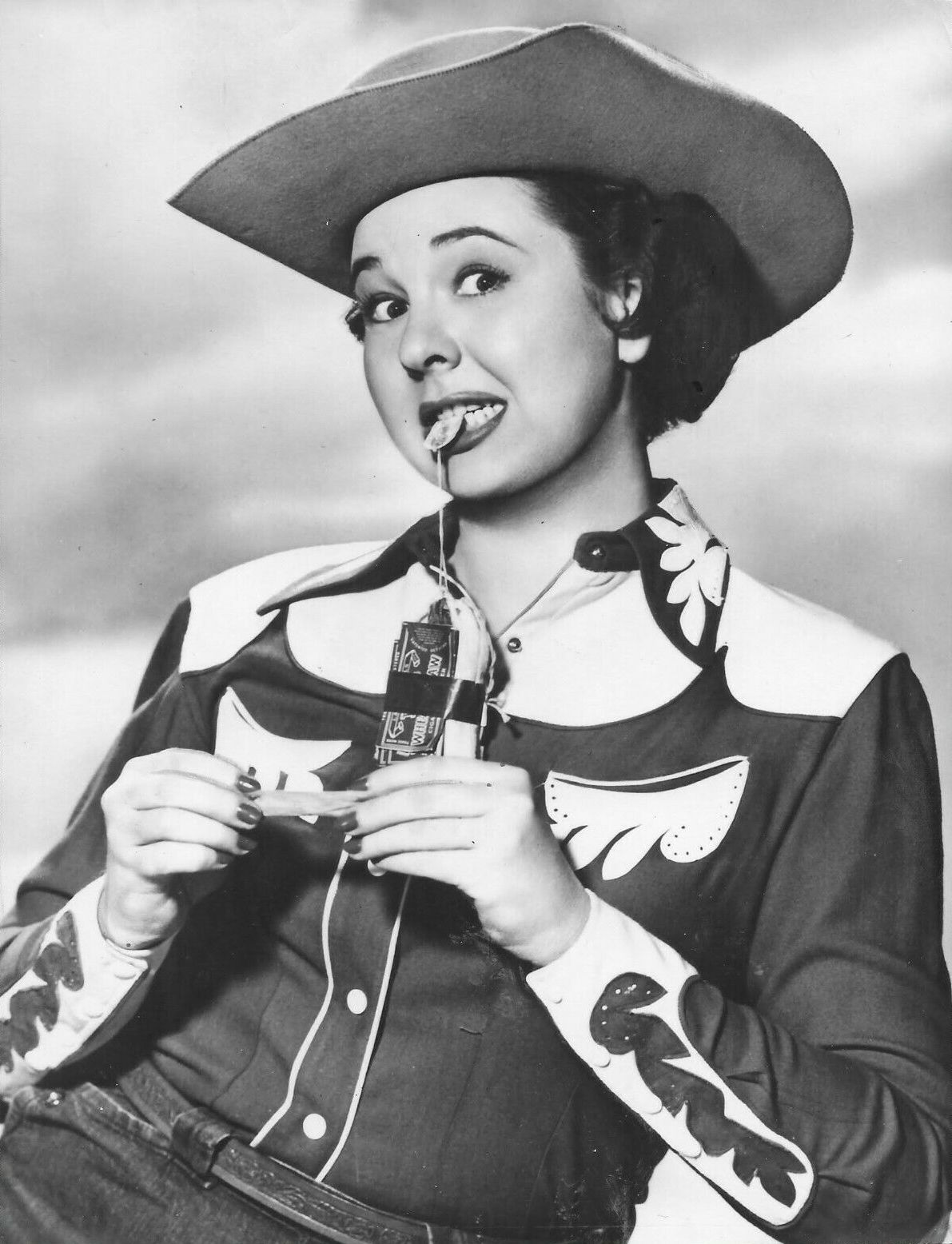
Press photo of Withers in Giant (1956)

In 1955, a year after her divorce from Moss, Withers returned to Los Angeles and enrolled in the University of Southern California film school with the intention of becoming a director. She returned to the screen when George Stevens asked her to take a supporting role in his 1956 film Giant. In 2006, Withers participated in a 50th-anniversary screening of the film for 700 attendees in Marfa, Texas, where location shooting had taken place.

Her performance in Giant led to more work as a character actor in both film and television. She appeared in television episodes of Pete and Gladys; General Electric Theater; The Alfred Hitchcock Hour; The Love Boat; and Murder, She Wrote. Though she received "dozens of offers" to do television series as well as stage musicals such as Mame; Hello, Dolly!; and No, No, Nanette, Withers was financially comfortable and chose to spend most of her time raising her children.

== Josephine the Plumber fame ==
I put a lot of myself into Josephine. I felt that any lady who was going to become a plumber cared an awful lot about her fellow man because when you need a plumber you need help.

— Jane Withers, 1979

In the mid-1960s, Withers gained new popularity as Josephine the Plumber, a character in a series of television commercials for Comet cleanser. Dressed in white work overalls and positioned near a sink, "Josephine" touted Comet's stain-removing ability as superior to other cleansers. The one-minute spots, which ran from 1963 to 1974, involved Withers in up to 30 storylines per year.

Withers invested much of her own personality into the character of Josephine, making her friendly, caring, and helpful. She also selected the type of work clothes a woman plumber would wear based on what she herself wore at home. She took a course in plumbing to play her part realistically. Her earnings from the long-running commercial helped her pay for a college education for all five of her children.

Withers retired as Josephine after her mother Ruth was diagnosed with a brain tumor. She cared for her mother for eight years until Ruth's death in 1983. The character of Josephine was described by the Los Angeles Times as being "one of the longest-running continuing characters in TV." Before retiring, Withers filmed two installments of the commercial introducing a young girl who had learned everything she knew about plumbing from "my aunt Josephine".

== Stage work ==
In late 1944, Withers made her stage debut in the musical comedy Glad To See You directed by Busby Berkeley. The show, intended for Broadway, closed after seven weeks of tryouts in Philadelphia and Boston. Withers sang the Jule Styne-Sammy Cahn torch song "Guess I'll Hang My Tears Out to Dry" written for the play; this was soon after covered by Frank Sinatra and Kate Smith and became a jazz and pop standard.

In 1971, Withers co-starred in the Broadway musical comedy Sure, Sure, Shirley which also brought Shirley Temple Black out of retirement. The performance, which featured a tap dancing sequence with 50 chorus dancers, was staged as an opening-night benefit for diabetics.

== Voice work ==
In the 1990s, Withers did voice acting for Disney animated films. In 1995, she was asked to record several lines of dialogue in imitation of the vocal patterns of Mary Wickes, who had recorded the voice of Laverne the gargoyle in The Hunchback of Notre Dame (1996) and had died during post-production. Withers reprised the role in The Hunchback of Notre Dame II (2002).

Withers narrated audiobooks, including a reading of Why Not Try God? by Mary Pickford which was distributed through a Southern California religious organization.

In the 1990s, she was interviewed on numerous television documentary retrospectives of the Golden Age of Hollywood. She herself was profiled in a 45-minute A&E Biography which aired in 2003.

In 1990, Withers began experiencing symptoms of lupus. She suffered from the disease over ten years, after which she went into remission. She began experiencing vertigo in 2007.

== Other activities ==
=== Doll collection ===
Withers began collecting dolls as a young child in Atlanta. The collection, enlarged by contributions from her fans, grew into one of the largest in the world. By the early 1940s, the collection was estimated at 3,500 dolls. By the 1980s, the collection numbered more than 8,000 dolls and 2,500 teddy bears. Withers purchased some of the dolls herself and received presents from fans; President Franklin D. Roosevelt sent her one of his teddy bears and First Lady Eleanor Roosevelt contributed a French doll she had received as a child.

In the 1980s, Withers announced plans to build a $1 million museum in Burbank, California, to display her collection, then stored in a 27,000 sq ft (2,500 m^{2}) warehouse. But the plans fell through and the dolls, along with crates of Hollywood film memorabilia that Withers had also collected during her film career or purchased at auction, continued to be warehoused. In 2004, the Los Angeles Times reported Withers had distributed more than 42,000 items for safekeeping among friends. A small part of the doll collection was sold at auction, and Withers participated in tours of her collection held in conjunction with these auctions. In 2013, she donated 6,000 of her dolls to a history museum in California.

=== Philanthropy ===
Withers engaged in philanthropy throughout her life. As a child star, she visited orphanages and hospitals to perform for other children. In 1937, she created 400 dolls using scraps she had recovered from the 20th Century Fox wardrobe department and gave them to needy children at Christmas. During World War II, she participated in more than 100 war bond drives and soldiers' camp tours in the United States. She also sent her personal doll collection—then numbering some 3,500 dolls—on a two-year tour which raised $2.5 million in funds for the U.S. war effort through 10-cent war savings stamp admissions. She involved President Roosevelt in this initiative, requesting from him the loan of a train on which she had the dolls arranged in museum-like displays to be seen by children across the country.

Withers donated 800 books from her personal library to start the Jane Withers Collection at the Thousand Oaks Library in Thousand Oaks, California.

=== Affiliations ===
Withers was active in dozens of charities. She served as a board member of the local branch of the American Cancer Society and the Hollywood Chamber of Commerce, and was instrumental in the development of the Hollywood Walk of Fame.

== Recognition ==
On November 6, 1939, Withers was invited to place her handprints and signature in the forecourt of Grauman's Chinese Theatre. On February 8, 1960, she was recognized for her contribution to film with a star on the Hollywood Walk of Fame, located at 6119 Hollywood Boulevard.

In 1979, Withers was the first recipient of the Young Artist Former Child Star Lifetime Achievement Award at the 1st Youth in Film Awards ceremony.

In 2003, she was the recipient of a Living Legacy Award from the Women's International Center, a non-profit education and service organization.

== Personal life ==
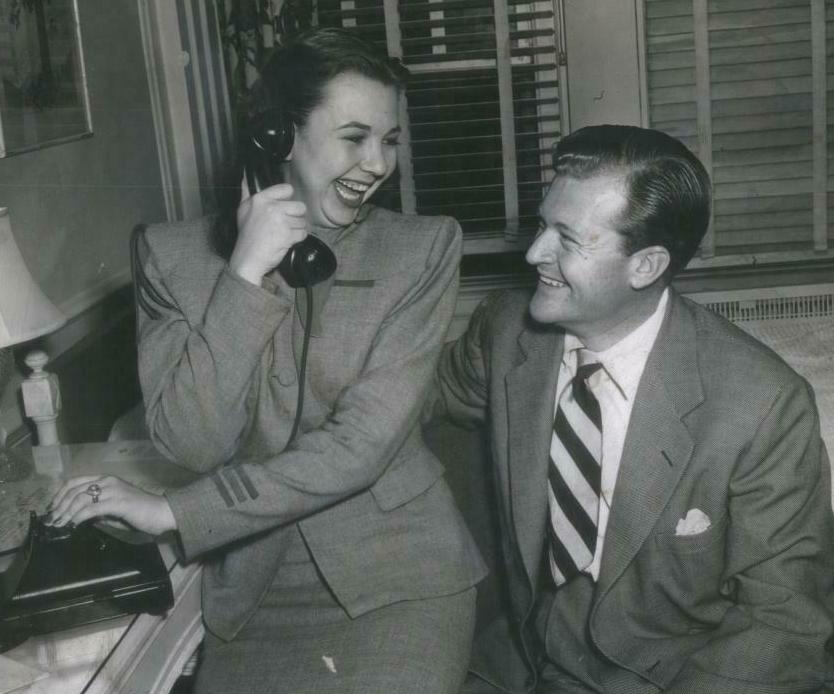
Withers and Moss during their engagement

=== Marriages and children ===
In May 1947, Withers announced her engagement to William (Bill) P. Moss Jr., a Texas entrepreneur and film producer, after a two-year courtship. They married on September 20, 1947. The couple lived on ranches in Midland, Texas, and New Mexico with their three children: Wendy Leigh Moss, William Paul Moss III, and Randy Moss. They separated in April 1953 and Withers was granted a divorce in July 1954, citing her husband's "excessive drinking and gambling". She received a $1 million property settlement, including monthly alimony and child support, trust fund and insurance fund for the children, and a half-interest in Texas oil fields owned by Moss, as well as full custody of the children. Suffering from emotional strain over the impending divorce, Withers was hospitalized for five months in 1953 with severe rheumatoid arthritis and developed complete paralysis. She recovered with no lasting effects.

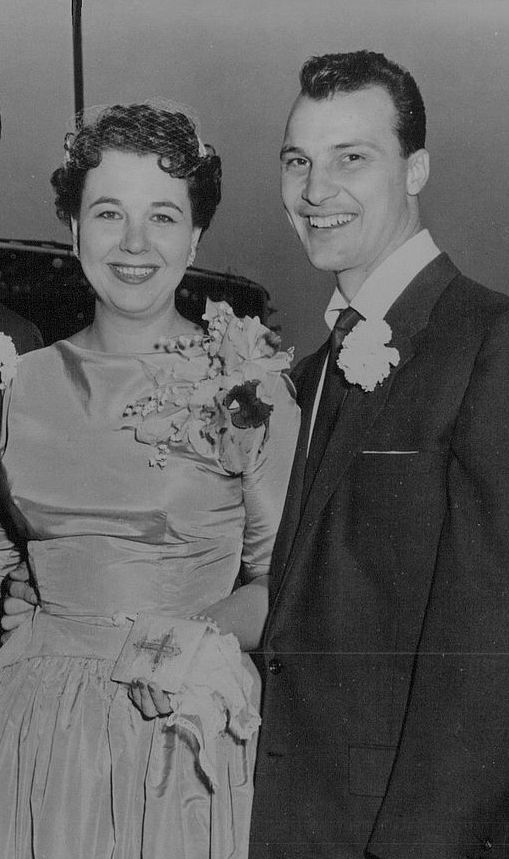
Withers and Errair on their wedding day, 1955

In October 1955, Withers married singer Kenneth Errair of The Four Freshmen, with whom she had two more children: Kenneth E. Errair, Jr. and Kendall Jane Errair. In June 1968, Errair died in a plane crash near Bass Lake, California. Withers' son, Randall Craig Moss, later died of cancer.

=== Religion ===
Withers was a devout Christian. Like her parents, she belonged to the Presbyterian Church. She taught Sunday school at the Beverly Hills Presbyterian Church together with the actresses Eleanor Powell and Gloria Stewart. She was a trustee of the Church of Religious Science in Los Angeles.

=== Death ===
Withers died in Burbank, California, on August 7, 2021, at the age of 95.

== Filmography ==
Film
Year	Title	Role	Notes
1932	Handle with Care	Girl at puppet show	Uncredited
1933	Cavalcade		Uncredited
1933	Zoo in Budapest	Little girl at zoo	Uncredited
1934	Tailspin Tommy	Little girl at premiere	Uncredited
1934	Imitation of Life	Peola's front-row classmate	Uncredited
1934	Kid Millions		Uncredited
1934	It's a Gift	Girl playing hopscotch	Uncredited
1934	Bright Eyes	Joy Smythe	
1935	The Good Fairy	Child in orphanage	Uncredited
1935	Ginger	Ginger	
1935	The Farmer Takes a Wife	Della	
1935	Redheads on Parade	Young girl	Uncredited
1935	This Is the Life	Geraldine Revier	
1936	Paddy O'Day	Paddy O'Day	
1936	Gentle Julia	Florence Atwater	
1936	Little Miss Nobody	Judy Devlin	
1936	Pepper	Pepper Jolly	
1937	The Holy Terror	Corky Wallace	
1937	Angel's Holiday	June "Angel" Everett	
1937	Wild and Woolly	Arnette Flynn	
1937	Can This Be Dixie?	Peg Gurgle	
1937	45 Fathers	Judith Frazier	
1937	Checkers	Checkers Judy	
1938	Rascals	Gypsy	
1938	Keep Smiling	Jane Rand	
1938	Always in Trouble	Jerry Darlington	
1939	The Arizona Wildcat	Mary Jane Patterson	
1939	Boy Friend	Sally Murphy	
1939	Chicken Wagon Family	Addie Fippany	
1939	Pack Up Your Troubles	Colette	
1940	High School	Jane Wallace	
1940	Shooting High	Jane Pritchard	
1940	The Girl from Avenue A	Jane	
1940	Youth Will Be Served	Edie May	
1941	Golden Hoofs	Jane Drake	
1941	Her First Beau	Penny Wood	
1941	A Very Young Lady	Kitty Russell	
1941	Small Town Deb	Patricia Randall	Wrote story under the pseudonym Jerrie Walters
1942	Young America	Jane Campbell	
1942	The Mad Martindales	Kathy Martindale	
1942	Johnny Doughboy	Ann / Penny	
1943	The North Star	Claudia	
1944	My Best Gal	Kitty O'Hara	
1944	Faces in the Fog	Mary Elliott	
1946	Affairs of Geraldine	Geraldine Cooper	
1947	Danger Street	Pat Marvin	
1956	Giant	Vashti Snythe	
1958	The Heart Is a Rebel	Grace	
1961	The Right Approach	Liz	
1963	Captain Newman, M.D.	Lieutenant Grace Blodgett	
1996	The Hunchback of Notre Dame	Additional Laverne dialogue	Voice
2002	The Hunchback of Notre Dame II	Laverne	Voice; final film role

Short subjects
Year	Title	Notes
1939	Hollywood Hobbies	
1940	Meet the Stars: Chinese Garden Festival	
1941	Meet the Stars: Stars at Play	
1941	Hedda Hopper's Hollywood No. 2	
1942	Hedda Hopper's Hollywood No. 4	
1942	Picture People No. 6: Hollywood War Efforts	
1945	Screen Snapshots: Fashions and Rodeo	
1956	Screen Snapshots: Hollywood Small Fry	

Television
Year	Title	Role	Episode
1949	The Chevrolet Tele-Theatre		Season 1 Episode 30: "Everybody Loves My Baby"
1958	Bachelor Father	Lucille Barlow	Season 2 Episode 6: "Bentley and the Wedding Bells"
1959	The United States Steel Hour	Aunt Jan	Season 6 Episode 22: "The Pink Burro"
1961	Malibu Run		Season 1 Episode 26: "The Frankie Adventure"
1961	General Electric Theater	Sue Ann Baines	Season 9 Episode 21: "A Possibility of Oil"
1962	General Electric Theater	Betty Hamilton	Season 10 Episode 24: "A Very Special Friend"
1962	Pete and Gladys	Wilma	Season 2 Episode 32: "Go Help Friends"
1962	Bachelor Father	Miss Sharkey	Season 5 Episode 40: "Curfew Shall Not Ring Tonight"
1964	The Alfred Hitchcock Hour	Edith Swinney	Season 2 Episode 11: "How to Get Rid of Your Wife"
1964	Summer Playhouse	Billie	"The Apartment House"
1964	The Munsters	Fanny Pike	Season 1 Episode 5: "Pike's Pique"
1966	The Munsters	Pamela Thornton	Season 2 Episode 20: "Grandpa's Lost Wife"
1975	All Together Now	Helen Drummond	TV movie
1980	The Love Boat	Gladys	Season 3 Episode 27: "Peekaboo and September Song"
1981	Hart to Hart	Roxy McGuane	Season 2 Episode 12: "Murder in the Saddle"
1982	Whatever Became Of...?		Reality TV pilot
1991	Murder, She Wrote	Marge Allen	Season 7 Episode 14: "Who Killed J.B. Fletcher?"
1993	Murder, She Wrote	Alma Sobel	Season 9 Episode 20: "Ship of Thieves"
1995	Amazing Grace	Esther Baker	Season 1 Episode 2: "Hallelujah"

TV specials
Year	Title	Role	Notes
1974	Mitzi: A Tribute to the American Housewife		
1977	The Winged Colt	Mrs. Minney	
1981	Zack & the Magic Factory	Aunt Daisy	

Documentaries
Year	Title	Notes
1974	Grammy Salutes Oscar	
1989	When We Were Young ... Growing Up on the Silver Screen	
1992	Shirley Temple: America's Little Darling	
1995	Betty Grable: Behind the Pin-Up	
1996	Shirley Temple: The Biggest Little Star	
1996	Alice Faye: The Star Next Door	
1997	20th Century-Fox: The First 50 Years	
2000	Hollywood at Your Feet: The Story of the Chinese Theatre Footprints	
2003	Biography	
2006	Private Screenings: Child Stars	

== Sources ==
- Carmack, Liz (2007). Historic Hotels of Texas: A Traveler's Guide. Texas A&M University Press. ISBN 9781585446087.
- Dietz, Dan (2015). The Complete Book of 1940s Broadway Musicals. Rowman & Littlefield. ISBN 9781442245280.
- Edwards, Anne (2017). Shirley Temple: American Princess. Rowman and Littlefield. ISBN 978-1-4930-2692-0.
- Ellenberger, Allan R. (2015). Margaret O'Brien: A Career Chronicle and Biography. McFarland. ISBN 9781476604015.
- Endres, Stacey; Cushman, Robert (1992). Hollywood at Your Feet: The Story of the World-famous Chinese Theatre. Pomegranate Press. ISBN 9780938817086.
- Fitzgerald, Michael G.; Magers, Boyd (2006). Ladies of the Western: Interviews with Fifty-One More Actresses from the Silent Era to the Television Westerns of the 1950s and 1960s. McFarland. ISBN 9780786426560.
- Fleming, E. J. (2015). Carole Landis: A Tragic Life in Hollywood. McFarland. ISBN 9780786482658.
- George-Warren, Holly (2009). Public Cowboy No. 1: The Life and Times of Gene Autry. Oxford University Press. ISBN 9780195372670.
- Gianakos, Larry James (1978). Television Drama Series Programming: A Comprehensive Chronicle, 1959-1975. Scarecrow Press. ISBN 9780810811164.
- Goldrup, Tom; Goldrup, Jim (2015). Growing Up on the Set: Interviews with 39 Former Child Actors of Classic Film and Television. McFarland. ISBN 978-1476613703.
- Granger, Farley; Calhoun, Robert (2007). Include Me Out: My life from Goldwyn to Broadway. St. Martin's Publishing Group. ISBN 9781429945448.
- Hammontree, Patsy Guy (1998). Shirley Temple Black: A bio-bibliography. Greenwood Press. ISBN 978-0313258480.
- Hatch, Kristen (2015). Shirley Temple and the Performance of Girlhood. Rutgers University Press. ISBN 9780813575483.
- Hischak, Thomas S. (2011). Disney Voice Actors: A Biographical Dictionary. McFarland. ISBN 978-0786486946.
- Huxford, Sharon (2003). Garage Sale & Flea Market Annual: Cashing in on Today's Lucrative Collectibles Market. Collector Books. ISBN 9781574323221.
- Martin, Len D. (2015). The Republic Pictures Checklist: Features, Serials, Cartoons, Short Subjects and Training Films of Republic Pictures Corporation, 1935-1959. McFarland. ISBN 978-1476609607.
- McKenna, Michael (2013). The ABC Movie of the Week: Big Movies for the Small Screen. Scarecrow Press. ISBN 9780810891579.
- Moreno, Barry (2019). Homes of Hollywood Stars. Arcadia Publishing. ISBN 9781467127301.
- Navarro, Dan (2010), "That Beautiful Brat: A visit with Jane Withers", in Tibbetts, John C.; Welsh, James M. (eds.), American Classic Screen Interviews, Scarecrow Press, ISBN 9780810876750
- Ohmart, Ben (2010). Judy Canova: Singin' in the Corn!. BearManor Media. ISBN 9781593933166.
- Parish, James Robert; Terrace, Vincent (1989). The Complete Actors' Television Credits, 1948-1988: Actresses (2nd ed.). Scarecrow Press. ISBN 9780810822047.
- Paul, Don M. (1941). "Inside Hollywood". Minicam Photography. 5. Automobile Digest Publishing Company.
- Prins, John (2008). Torrance Police Department. Arcadia Publishing. ISBN 9781439634196.
- Saavedra, Scott (2020). Eury, Michael (ed.). "Ad Men & Women: Favorite characters from TV commercials". RetroFan #9. TwoMorrows Publishing.
- Solomon, Aubrey (2002). Twentieth Century-Fox: A Corporate and Financial History. Rowman & Littlefield. ISBN 978-0810842441.
- Taravella, Steve (2013). Mary Wickes: I Know I've Seen That Face Before. University Press of Mississippi. ISBN 978-1604739053.
- Terrace, Vincent (2014). Encyclopedia of Television Shows, 1925 through 2010 (2nd ed.). McFarland. ISBN 9780786486410.
- Terrace, Vincent (2013). Television Specials: 5,336 Entertainment Programs, 1936-2012 (2nd ed.). McFarland. ISBN 9781476612409.
- Tierney, Tom (2003). Famous Child Stars Paper Dolls. Courier Corporation. ISBN 978-0486430577.
- Troyan, Michael; et al. (2017). Twentieth Century Fox: A Century of Entertainment. Rowman & Littlefield. ISBN 9781630761431.
- Verswijver, Leo (2003). 'Movies Were Always Magical': Interviews with 19 Actors, Directors, and Producers from the Hollywood of the 1930s through the 1950s. McFarland. ISBN 978-0786411290.
- Webb, Graham (2020). Encyclopedia of American Short Films, 1926-1959. McFarland. ISBN 978-1476639260.
- White, Raymond E. (2006). King of the Cowboys, Queen of the West: Roy Rogers and Dale Evans. Popular Press. ISBN 9780299210045.
- Wojcik, Pamela Robertson (2016). Fantasies of Neglect: Imagining the Urban Child in American Film and Fiction. Rutgers University Press. ISBN 978-0813573625.
- Young, William H.; Young, Nancy K. (2007). The Great Depression in America: A Cultural Encyclopedia. Vol. 2. Greenwood Publishing Group. ISBN 978-0313335228.

== Bibliography ==
- Heisenfelt, Kathryn (1944). Jane Withers and the Swamp Wizard. Whitman Publishing.
- Packer, Eleanor (1935). Jane Withers in This Is the Life. Big Little Book series #1179. Whitman Publishing.
- Packer, Eleanor (1936). Jane Withers, Twentieth Century-Fox Star: Her Life Story. Whitman Publishing.
- Packer, Eleanor (1938). Jane Withers in Keep Smiling. Better-Little Book #1463. Whitman Publishing.
- Packer, Eleanor; Vallely, Henry E. (1942). Jane Withers and the Hidden Room. Whitman Publishing.
- Snell, Roy J. (1943). Jane Withers and the Phantom Violin. Whitman Publishing.
- Theriault, Florence (2004). Lovingly: The Childhood Doll Collection of Jane Withers. Archived from the original on September 28, 2020.
