= Checkers (1937 film) =

1937 film by H. Bruce Humberstone

- Theatrical release poster
- Directed by: H. Bruce Humberstone
- Screenplay by: Robert Chapin; Karen DeWolf; Frank Fenton; Lynn Root
- Story by: Frank Fenton; Lynn Root
- Produced by: John Stone
- Starring: Jane Withers; Stuart Erwin; Una Merkel; Marvin Stephens
- Cinematography: Daniel B. Clark
- Edited by: Jack Murray
- Music by: Samuel Kaylin
- Production company: 20th Century Fox
- Distributed by: 20th Century Fox
- Release date: December 8, 1937
- Running time: 79 minutes
- Country: United States
- Language: English

Checkers is a 1937 American drama film directed by H. Bruce Humberstone and written by Robert Chapin, Karen DeWolf, Frank Fenton and Lynn Root. The film stars Jane Withers, Stuart Erwin, Una Merkel, Marvin Stephens, Andrew Tombes and June Carlson. The film was released on December 8, 1937, by 20th Century Fox.

== Plot ==
A veterinarian repairs a horse's leg so the animal can run in a big race and save a man's farm.

== Cast ==
- Jane Withers as Checkers
- Stuart Erwin as Edgar Connell
- Una Merkel as Mamie Appleby
- Marvin Stephens as Jimmy Somers
- Andrew Tombes as Tobias Somers
- June Carlson as Sarah Williams
- Minor Watson as Dr. Smith
- John Harrington as Mr. Green
- Spencer Charters as Zeb
- Francis Ford as Daniel Snodgrass
