= Charles Arnt =

American actor (1906–1990)

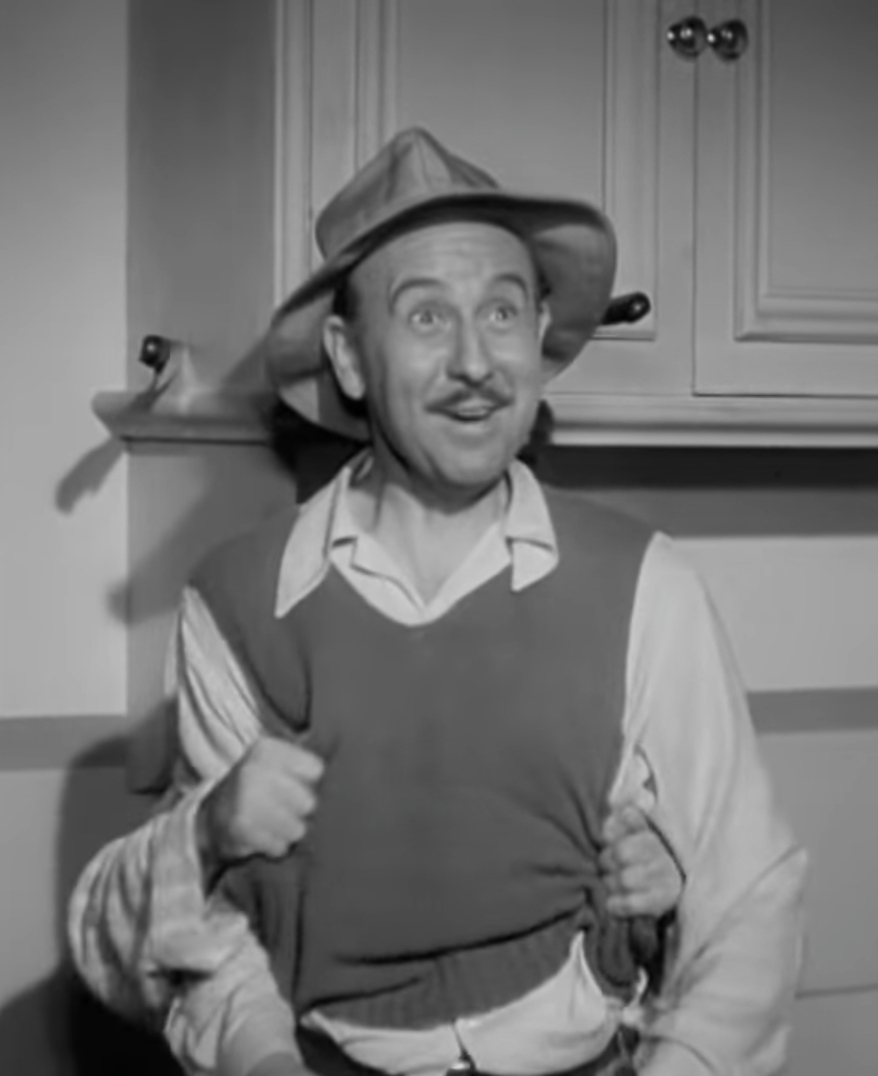
- Arnt in My Favorite Brunette (1947)
- Born: Charles E. Arnt; August 20, 1906; Michigan City, Indiana, U.S.
- Died: August 6, 1990 (aged 83); Orcas Island, Washington, U.S.
- Education: Princeton University
- Occupation: Actor
- Years active: 1933–1962
- Spouse: Patricia Arnt
- Children: 3

Charles E. Arnt (August 20, 1906 – August 6, 1990) was an American film actor from 1933 to 1962. Arnt appeared as a character actor in more than 200 films.

Arnt was born in Michigan City, Indiana, the son of a banker. He graduated from Phillips Academy and Princeton University. While at Princeton, he helped to found the University Players and was president of the Princeton Triangle Club theatrical troupe. He became a banker after he graduated from college.

In the early 1930s, Arnt acted with the University Repertory Theater in Maryland. On Broadway, he appeared in Carry Nation (1932), Three Waltzes (1937), and Knickerbocker Holiday (1938).

In 1962, Arnt retired from acting and began to import and breed Charolais cattle on a ranch in Washington state. Arnt died in Orcas Island, Washington.

== Selected filmography ==
- Roman Scandals (1933) – Caius, the Food Taster (uncredited)
- Ladies Should Listen (1934) – Albert, the manservant
- Ready for Love (1934) – Sam Gardner
- Here Is My Heart (1934) – Higgins, Paul's Valet
- Stolen Harmony (1935) – Clem Walters
- Two for Tonight (1935) – Benny
- She Married Her Boss (1935) – Victor Jessup
- The Witness Chair (1936) – Mr. Henshaw
- And Sudden Death (1936) – Archie Sloan
- Rhythm on the Range (1936) – Dining Car Steward (uncredited)
- Wedding Present (1936) – Reporter (uncredited)
- Sinner Take All (1936) – Lampier's Secretary (uncredited)
- Mind Your Own Business (1936) – Reporter (uncredited)
- College Holiday (1936) – Ticket Clerk (uncredited)
- After the Thin Man (1936) – Drunk Greeting Nick and Nora at Party (uncredited)
- Swing High, Swing Low (1937) – Georgie
- Angel's Holiday (1937) – Ralph Everett
- Mountain Music (1937) – Hotel Manager (uncredited)
- It Happened in Hollywood (1937) – Jed Reed
- Remember the Night (1940) – Tom
- The Shop Around the Corner (1940) – Policeman (uncredited)
- Grandpa Goes to Town (1940) – Movie Producer (uncredited)
- We Who Are Young (1940) – Eckman (uncredited)
- I Love You Again (1940) – Billings
- Little Men (1940) – Drunk in Medicine Show (uncredited)
- Dr. Kildare's Crisis (1940) – Mr. Stubbins, Man with Pain (uncredited)
- Play Girl (1941) – Grady (uncredited)
- Back Street (1941) – Mr. Mason (uncredited)
- Mr. District Attorney (1941) – Herman Winkle
- Pot o' Gold (1941) – Parks
- Tight Shoes (1941) – Lawyer Fenwick (uncredited)
- Blossoms in the Dust (1941) – G. Harrington Hedger
- Hello, Sucker (1941) – Studson (uncredited)
- Dressed to Kill (1941) – Hal Brennon
- Hold Back the Dawn (1941) – Mr. John MacAdams
- We Go Fast (1941) – Refrigerator Salesman
- Great Guns (1941) – Doctor
- Marry the Boss's Daughter (1941) – Blodgett
- Paris Calling (1941) – Lieutenant Lantz
- Ball of Fire (1941) – McNeary
- The Lady Has Plans (1942) – Pooly
- Young America (1942) – Principal Rice
- This Gun for Hire (1942) – Male Dressmaker
- My Gal Sal (1942) – Tailor
- Twin Beds (1942) – Manager
- Take a Letter, Darling (1942) – Fud Newton
- The Falcon's Brother (1942) – Pat Moffett (uncredited)
- That Other Woman (1942) – Bailey
- Pittsburgh (1942) – Building Site Laborer (uncredited)
- The Great Gildersleeve (1942) – Judge Horace Hooker
- Reunion in France (1942) – Honoré
- Gildersleeve's Bad Day (1943) – Judge Horace Hooker
- Henry Aldrich Swings It (1943) – Boyle
- Young Ideas (1943) – Station Master (uncredited)
- Gangway for Tomorrow (1943) – Jim Benson
- In Old Oklahoma (1943) – Joe, Train Conductor (uncredited)
- Up in Arms (1944) – Mr. Higginbotham
- Gambler's Choice (1944) – Honest John McGrady
- Once Upon a Time (1944) – Fred Stacy, Reporter (uncredited)
- The Seventh Cross (1944) – Herr Binder (uncredited)
- Three Little Sisters (1944) – Ezra Larkin
- The Impatient Years (1944) – Marriage Clerk (uncredited)
- My Pal Wolf (1944) – Papa Eisdaar
- Greenwich Village (1944) – Author with Letter (uncredited)
- Dangerous Passage (1944) – Daniel Bergstrom
- Double Exposure (1944) – Sonny Tucker
- Together Again (1944) – Clerk (uncredited)
- The Crime Doctor's Courage (1945) – Butler
- Without Love (1945) – Colonel Braden (uncredited)
- Strange Illusion (1945) – Professor Muhlbach
- Sudan (1945) – Khafra
- Christmas in Connecticut (1945) – Homer Higgenbottom (uncredited)
- Dangerous Intruder (1945) – Max Ducone
- The Girl of the Limberlost (1945) – Hodges
- She Wouldn't Say Yes (1945) – Train Conductor (uncredited)
- Pardon My Past (1945) – Clothes Salesman
- Miss Susie Slagle's (1946) – Mr. Johnson
- Behind Green Lights (1946) – Daniel Boone Wintergreen (uncredited)
- Just Before Dawn (1946) – Attorney Allen S. Tobin (uncredited)
- Cinderella Jones (1946) – Mahoney
- The Hoodlum Saint (1946) – Cy Nolan, O'Neill's Secretary
- Blondie's Lucky Day (1946) – Mayor Richard Denby
- Without Reservations (1946) – Salesman
- Somewhere in the Night (1946) – Little Man with Glasses (uncredited)
- Big Town (1946) – Amos Peabody
- That Brennan Girl (1946) – Fred, Natalie's 2nd Husband
- Calendar Girl (1947) – Captain Olsen
- That Way with Women (1947) – Harry Miller
- Fall Guy (1947) – Uncle Jim Grossett
- My Favorite Brunette (1947) – Crawford
- Saddle Pals (1947) – William Schooler
- Big Town After Dark (1947) – Amos Peabody
- High Wall (1947) – Sidney X. Hackle
- Sitting Pretty (1948) – Mr. Taylor (uncredited)
- Big Town Scandal (1948) – Amos Peabody
- Michael O'Halloran (1948) – Doc Douglas Bruce
- Hollow Triumph (1948) – Coblenz
- The Boy with Green Hair (1948) – Mr. Hammond
- That Wonderful Urge (1948) – Mr. Bissell (uncredited)
- Boston Blackie's Chinese Venture (1949) – Pop Gerard
- Any Number Can Play (1949) – Joe Josephs (uncredited)
- Masked Raiders (1949) – Dr. W.J. Nichols
- Bride for Sale (1949) – Dobbs
- Wabash Avenue (1950) – Horace Carter
- He's a Cockeyed Wonder (1950) – J.B. Caldwell
- The Sun Sets at Dawn (1950) – Reporter, Globe Express
- The Man Who Cheated Himself (1950) – Ernest Quimby
- The Great Sioux Uprising (1953) – Gist
- The Veils of Bagdad (1953) – Zapolya
- Flood Tide (1958) – Mr. Appleby, Grocer
- A Nice Little Bank That Should Be Robbed (1958) – Mr. Simms aka Pop (uncredited)
- The Miracle of the Hills (1959) – Fuzzy
- Alfred Hitchcock Presents (1961) (Season 6 Episode 38: "Ambition") as George the Mayor
- Wild in the Country (1961) – Mr. Parsons (uncredited)
- Sweet Bird of Youth (1962) – Mayor Henricks)
