= Young America (1942 film) =

1942 film by Louis King

- Theatrical release poster
- Directed by: Louis King
- Screenplay by: Samuel G. Engel
- Produced by: Sol M. Wurtzel
- Starring: Jane Withers; Jane Darwell; Lynne Roberts; William Tracy; Robert Cornell; Roman Bohnen
- Cinematography: Glen MacWilliams
- Edited by: Louis R. Loeffler
- Production company: 20th Century Fox
- Distributed by: 20th Century Fox
- Release date: February 6, 1942
- Running time: 73 minutes
- Country: United States
- Language: English

Young America is a 1942 American drama film directed by Louis King and written by Samuel G. Engel. The film stars Jane Withers, Jane Darwell, Lynne Roberts, Robert Cornell, William Tracy and Roman Bohnen. The film was released on February 6, 1942, by 20th Century Fox.

== Cast ==
- Jane Withers as Jane Campbell
- Jane Darwell as Grandmother Nora Campbell
- Lynne Roberts as Elizabeth Barnes
- Robert Cornell as Jonathan Blake
- William Tracy as Earl Tucker
- Roman Bohnen as Mr. Barnes
- Irving Bacon as Bart Munson
- Ben Carter as Abraham
- Louise Beavers as Pansy
- Darryl Hickman as David Engstrom
- Carmencita Johnson as Hazel
- Sally Harper as Susie Clark
- Daphne Ogden as Ellen
- Charles Arnt as Principal Rice
- Hamilton MacFadden as Jim Benson
