= Bright Eyes (1934 film) =

1934 film by David Butler

- Theatrical release poster
- Directed by: David Butler
- Written by: David Butler; Edwin J. Burke
- Screenplay by: William Conselman; Henry Johnson
- Produced by: Sol M. Wurtzel
- Starring: Shirley Temple; James Dunn; Jane Darwell
- Cinematography: Arthur Miller
- Music by: Richard A. Whiting; Samuel Kaylin
- Distributed by: Fox Film
- Release date: December 28, 1934
- Running time: 83 minutes
- Country: United States
- Language: English
- Budget: $190,000

Bright Eyes is a 1934 American comedy drama film directed by David Butler. The screenplay by William Conselman is based on a story by David Butler and Edwin J. Burke.

== Plot ==
Five-year-old Shirley Blake (Shirley Temple) and her widowed mother Mary (Lois Wilson), a maid, live in the home of her employers, the wealthy and mean-spirited Smythe family: Anita (Dorothy Christy), J. Wellington (Theodore von Eltz), their spoiled seven-year-old daughter Joy (Jane Withers), and cantankerous wheelchair-using Uncle Ned (Charles Sellon). After Christmas morning, Shirley visits her late father's pilot friends at the airport. The aviators bring her aboard an airplane and taxi her around the runways while she serenades them with a rendition of "On the Good Ship Lollipop."

That day, Mary is killed in a traffic accident. Loop (James Dunn), one of the pilots and Shirley's godfather, takes Shirley in an airplane, explaining that they are in Heaven, where her mother now rests. When the Smythes learn of Mary's death, they plan to send Shirley to an orphanage. However, Uncle Ned, who has grown fond of "Bright Eyes," insists that Shirley stay with them. To raise money for attorney fees, Loop reluctantly accepts a lucrative contract to deliver an item by plane cross-country to New York during a dangerous storm. Unbeknown to him, little Shirley has sneaked away from the Smythes' home, found his airplane at the airport, and stowed away inside. When their plane loses control in the storm in the wilderness, they parachute to the ground together and are eventually rescued. The impasse over custody gets resolved when Loop, his former fiancée Adele (Judith Allen), Uncle Ned, and Shirley decide to live together. The Smythes leave the courthouse miserably, except Joy, at first; when she rudely comments that at least they don't have to be nice to Uncle Ned anymore, her mother slaps her hard across the face.

== Cast ==
- Shirley Temple as Shirley Blake, a five-year-old girl who is Mary Blake's daughter
- James Dunn as James "Loop" Merritt, a bachelor pilot and Shirley's godfather
- Lois Wilson as Mary Blake, Shirley's widowed mother who works as a maid for the Smythe family
- Judith Allen as Adele Martin, a socialite and Loop's estranged fiancée
- Charles Sellon as Uncle Ned Smith, the Smythes' cranky patriarch who has a tenderness for Shirley
- Theodor von Eltz as J. Wellington Smythe, a haughty nouveau-riche
- Dorothy Christy as Anita Smythe, J. Wellington Smythe's equally arrogant wife
- Jane Withers as Joy Smythe, J. Wellington & Anita's spoiled and obnoxious seven-year-old daughter
- Brandon Hurst as Higgins, the Smythes' butler
- Jane Darwell as Elizabeth Higgins, the Smythes' cook
- Walter Johnson as Thomas, the Smythes' chauffeur
- George Irving as Judge Thompson
- Terry as Rags, Loop's dog

== Production ==
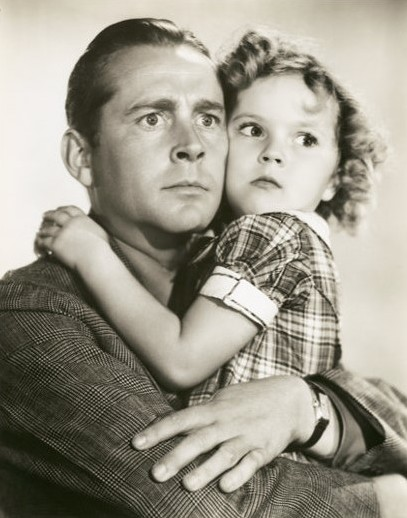
James Dunn and Temple in a publicity photo for Bright Eyes

American Airlines and the Douglas Aircraft Company, recognizing the potential of the film in advertising air travel, cooperated in the production and distribution. They provided a DC-2 aircraft, designated "A-74", for the exterior shots while a true to scale mock up was provided for the interior scenes. A 12-passenger Curtiss T-32 Condor II transport biplane, designated "Condor 151", in early American Airlines (and Air Mail) livery also features in prominent scenes. In the famous Good Ship Lollipop scene, members of the University of Southern California football team served as extras. In the second flying scene where Temple's character sneaks aboard the plane, and they were forced to bail out of it, both Temple and Dunn were strapped into a harness hoisted up into the studio rafters. They were supposed to drift down with the aid of a wind machine. In the first take, someone inadvertently opened an airproof door just as they landed, creating a vacuum that sucked out the parachute and dragged them both across the studio floor. Marilyn Granas served as a stand-in for Temple, as she had for her previous movies. She would later be replaced by Mary Lou Isleib, who would remain as Temple's stand-in for the rest of her tenure at 20th Century Fox.

== Reception ==
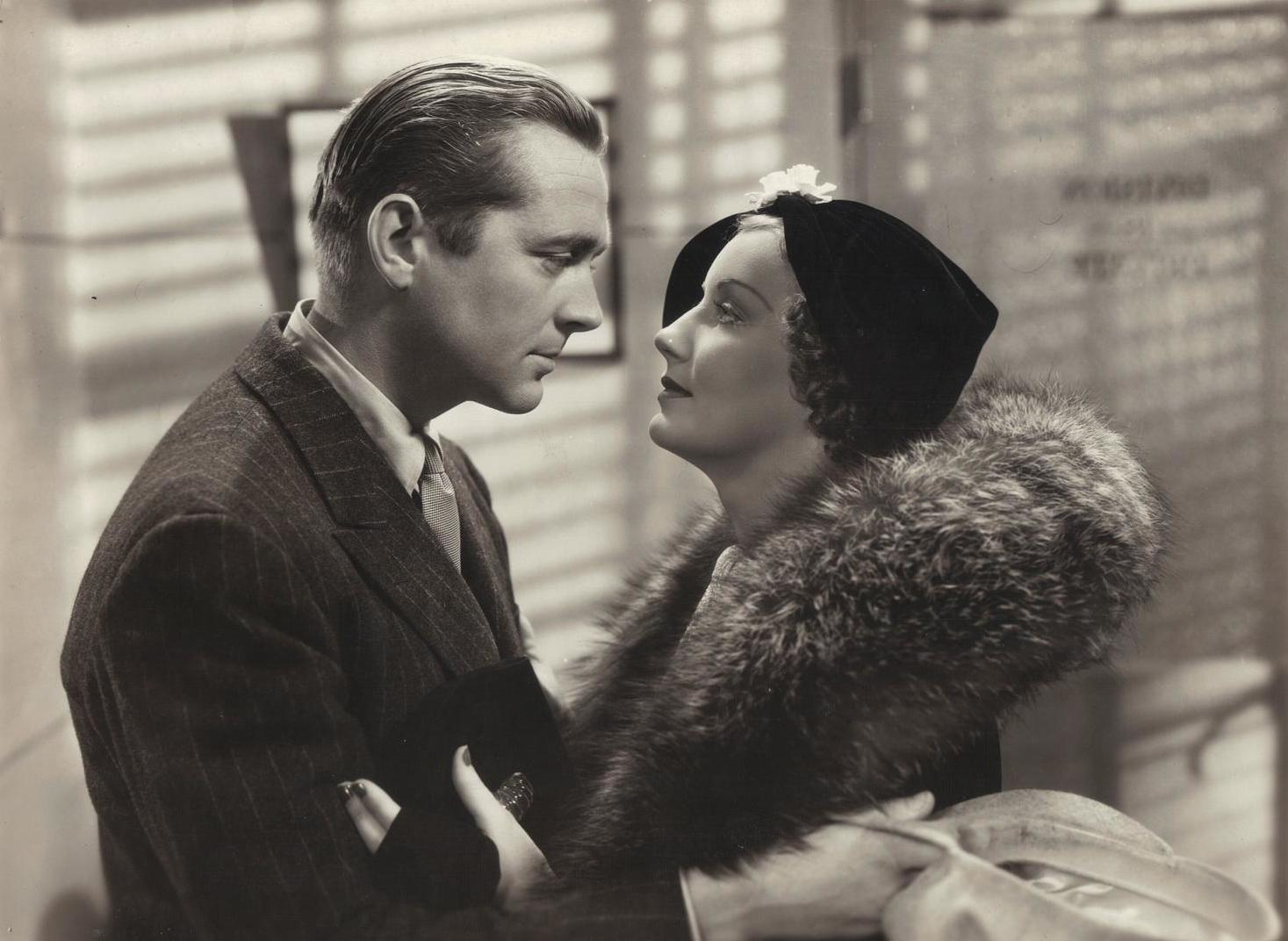
Press photo of Dunn and Judith Allen

The film received positive reviews. Rotten Tomatoes holds an approval rating of 83%, based on 12 reviews, with an average rating of 6.6/10.

Heather Boerner of Common Sense Media gave the film a rate of three stars out of four, calling it a "sweet story with a candy coating." She also noted that some scenes are "sad, bitter in the center of this confection that may be too tough on younger viewers."

=== Awards and honors ===
Temple received a miniature Oscar on February 27, 1935, for her contributions to film entertainment in 1934, chiefly for Little Miss Marker and Bright Eyes. She was the first child actor to receive an Academy Award.

The film is recognized by American Film Institute in these lists:

- 2004: AFI's 100 Years...100 Songs:
  - "On the Good Ship Lollipop" – #69

== Soundtrack ==
- "On the Good Ship Lollipop" (1934) (uncredited)
  - Music by Richard A. Whiting
  - Lyrics by Sidney Clare
- "Silent Night" (1818) (uncredited)
  - Music by Franz Gruber
  - Lyrics by Joseph Mohr
- "The Man on the Flying Trapeze" (1867) (uncredited)
  - Music by Gaston Lyle
  - Lyrics by George Leybourne
  - Sung a cappella by Charles Sellon
- "Jingle Bells" (1857) (uncredited)
  - Music by James Pierpont

== See also ==
- Shirley Temple filmography
- List of Christmas films
