= Nick DeMaggio =

American film editor

- Born: December 27, 1890; Costa Mesa, California, United States
- Died: January 23, 1981 (aged 90); Costa Mesa, California, United States
- Occupation: Film editor
- Years active: 1935-1954

Nick Henry DeMaggio (December 27, 1890 – January 23, 1981) was an American film editor.

== Selected filmography (as editor) ==
- Hot Water (1937)
- Up the River (1938)
- News Is Made at Night (1939)
- The Lone Star Ranger (1942)
- The Mad Martindales (1942)
- ‘’Night and the City ‘’ (1950)
- Pickup on South Street (1953)
