= Hal Roach's Streamliners =

Short film series

"Hal Roach's Streamliners" are a series of featurette comedy films created by Hal Roach that are longer than a short subject and shorter than a feature film, not exceeding 50 minutes in length. Twenty of the 29 features that Roach produced for United Artists were in the streamliner format. They usually consisted of five 10-minute reels.

== History ==
Roach's studio initially produced comedy short subjects, but in 1935, he sensed that short subjects were declining in popularity as the double-feature format was popular in theaters. By 1939 Roach noticed that Hollywood's major "A" features were becoming longer and more ambitious, creating a problem for theater owners who couldn't fit a second feature into their daily programs. When Roach began producing films for United Artists, he devised the idea of shorter-length featurettes that he called "streamliners" (after the public's infatuation with the modern and fast streamliner trains). The exhibitors, accustomed to the usual six- or seven-reel "B" feature, could now book a four- or five-reel Hal Roach streamliner instead of a "B" feature, shaving 20 valuable minutes off an already lengthy double-feature program.

United Artists resisted the radical new format at first, because it had already negotiated 5,000 contracts with exhibitors for feature films, not featurettes. Roach had planned to make four four-reel streamliners with Laurel and Hardy to introduce the featurettes, beginning with A Chump at Oxford, filmed in 1939. United Artists felt that this picture would be more marketable as a full-length feature film, especially since Laurel and Hardy were an important attraction internationally. A Chump at Oxford and the next film, Saps at Sea, were released in six reels each.

Roach insisted that there would be a ready market for the shorter streamliners. After disposing of the Laurel and Hardy commitment, which lapsed after only the two films, Roach concentrated on making featurettes. Exhibitors welcomed the new format, and the streamliners fit nicely into double-feature programs. Roach recalled in 1970 that "this was just before the second World War. We made 17 45-minute comedies. They were accepted as features, and we made a million dollars on that first group". Roach also made one musical streamliner in Technicolor, Fiesta.

Roach's last two Laurel and Hardy features were produced economically, but the budget of a streamliner was set even lower, at $110,000. Roach could produce four streamliners for the cost of two feature films, yet profits would yield an estimated 50 to 75% more than would a single feature.

Roach's short subjects of the 1920s and 1930s had been grouped into series, and the new Roach streamliners followed suit. The first and most popular series co-starred William Tracy and Joe Sawyer in military comedies. The second revived the 1930s teaming of ZaSu Pitts and Slim Summerville. The third was an update of Roach's 1932-33 "Taxi Boys" series, now with William Bendix and Joe Sawyer as cab drivers. The fourth series burlesqued the Axis powers, with comedian Bobby Watson impersonating Adolf Hitler and Joe Devlin imitating Benito Mussolini. The fifth and last was a series of comedy westerns with Noah Beery, Jr. and Jimmy Rogers (son of humorist Will Rogers).

== Streamliners ==
- A Chump at Oxford (42 minutes, 1939; unreleased until 1943). This Laurel and Hardy comedy was the first streamliner produced. United Artists rejected the completed featurette in favor of an extended version running 63 minutes. Both were directed by Alfred Goulding. Hal Roach shelved the shorter version until 1943, when UA finally released it to theaters.
- Tanks a Million was the first official streamliner (50 minutes, released on September 12, 1941), and the first of seven military comedies starring William Tracy and Joe Sawyer. Directed by Fred Guiol.
- Niagara Falls (43 minutes, October 17, 1941) starring ZaSu Pitts and Slim Summerville, directed by Guiol.
- All-American Co-Ed (49 minutes, October 31, 1941), a musical comedy starring Johnny Downs and Frances Langford, directed by LeRoy Prinz.
- Miss Polly (45 minutes, November 14, 1941), the second and final Pitts-Summerville teaming, directed by Guiol.
- Fiesta (45 minutes, November 28, 1941), a Technicolor musical comedy set in Mexico City and directed by Prinz.
- Hay Foot (48 minutes, January 2, 1942), a Tracy and Sawyer military comedy directed by Guiol.
- Brooklyn Orchid (50 minutes, January 31, 1942) with William Bendix and Joe Sawyer, directed by Kurt Neumann.
- Dudes Are Pretty People (43 minutes, March 13, 1942) with Jimmy Rogers and Noah Beery, Jr., directed by Hal Roach, Jr.
- About Face (43 minutes, April 16, 1942) with Tracy and Sawyer, directed by Neumann.
- Flying with Music (46 minutes, May 22, 1942), a musical comedy nominated for two Academy Awards, directed by George Archainbaud.
- The Devil with Hitler (44 minutes, October 22, 1942), a wartime burlesque with Bobby Watson and Joe Devlin, directed by Gordon Douglas.
- The McGuerins from Brooklyn (45 minutes, December 31, 1942) with Bendix and Sawyer, directed by Neumann.
- Calaboose (45 minutes, January 29, 1943) with Rogers and Beery, directed by Roach, Jr.
- Fall In (45 minutes, March 5, 1943) with Tracy and Sawyer, directed by Neumann.
- Taxi, Mister (46 minutes, April 16, 1943) with Bendix and Sawyer, directed by Neumann.
- Prairie Chickens (48 minutes, May 21, 1943) with Rogers and Beery, directed by Roach, Jr.
- Yanks Ahoy (50 minutes, June 29, 1943) with Tracy and Sawyer, directed by Neumann.
- That Nazty Nuisance (43 minutes, August 6, 1943), a sequel to The Devil with Hitler with Watson and Devlin, directed by Glenn Tryon.

World War II interrupted Roach's Hollywood film production, and he was commissioned as a major in the Army Signal Corps. The Hal Roach studio was later used for military training films, and the facility was known as "Fort Roach".

== Postwar streamliners ==
Hal Roach rebuilt and updated his studio facilities in 1946, and resolved to make his new films entirely in color, using the Cinecolor process. He resumed production with slightly longer films, still running under an hour each:

- Curley (53 minutes, released August 23, 1947), directed by Bernard Carr, reviving the Our Gang kid-comedy format.
- The Fabulous Joe (59 minutes, August 29, 1947), a farce about a talking dog, starring Walter Abel and directed by Harve Foster.
- Here Comes Trouble (55 minutes, March 15, 1948), following the William Tracy and Joe Sawyer team into civilian life, directed by Fred Guiol.
- Who Killed Doc Robbin (55 minutes, April 9, 1948), a sequel to Curley directed by Bernard Carr.

United Artists packaged these as ready-made double features. The Hal Roach Comedy Carnival combined Curley and The Fabulous Joe. Lafftime combined Here Comes Trouble and Who Killed Doc Robbin. Similarly, but with more continuity, in 1948 Roach and director Kurt Neumann compiled the feature-length Two Knights from Brooklyn from the streamliners The McGuerins from Brooklyn and Taxi, Mister.

Hal Roach gave up on the streamliner format in 1948. Roach recalled that "they should have cost $150,000 apiece, but they ran from $300,000 to $400,000, and they weren't worth that much money. We lost about a million dollars. The second batch of streamliners, instead of being a success, was a flop and the result was that we went into television". Roach's film Sadie and Sally has been misidentified as a theatrical streamliner; it was actually a half-hour television pilot conceived in 1948.

The Tracy and Sawyer team would reappear in two films produced by Hal Roach, Jr. in a Korean War setting: As You Were (1951) and Mr. Walkie Talkie (1952), both directed by Fred Guiol and released by Lippert Pictures.
