= Brooklyn Orchid =

1942 film by Kurt Neumann

- Theatrical release poster
- Directed by: Kurt Neumann
- Screenplay by: Earle Snell; Clarence Marks
- Produced by: Hal Roach
- Starring: William Bendix; Joe Sawyer; Marjorie Woodworth; Grace Bradley; Richard "Skeets" Gallagher; Florine McKinney; Leonid Kinskey
- Cinematography: Robert Pittack
- Edited by: Ray Snyder
- Music by: Edward Ward
- Production company: Hal Roach Studios
- Distributed by: United Artists
- Release date: January 31, 1942
- Running time: 50 minutes
- Country: United States
- Language: English

Brooklyn Orchid is a 1942 American comedy film directed by Kurt Neumann and written by Earle Snell and Clarence Marks that was one of Hal Roach's Streamliners. The film stars William Bendix, Joe Sawyer, Marjorie Woodworth, Grace Bradley, Richard "Skeets" Gallagher, Florine McKinney and Leonid Kinskey. The film was released on January 31, 1942, by United Artists.

This was the first of the so-called Taxi Comedies series, which featured Bendix, Sawyer, and Bradley playing the same characters. The latter two films were The McGuerins from Brooklyn and Taxi, Mister.

== Plot ==
A couple of cab drivers, Tim McGuerin and Eddie Corbett, cope with the women in their lives. Tim's social-climbing wife Sadie has a secret, that she once worked as a stripper. Eddie's conniving sweetheart Mabel plans to use this information against Sadie when she becomes irritated by her.

Tim and Eddie go fishing and catch a whopper—a beautiful woman. Lucy Gibbs turns out to be the winner of the "Brooklyn Orchid" beauty pageant, but rather than be pleased, she's actually making a suicide attempt over its adverse effect on her life. She now blames Tim and Eddie for spoiling her plans.

The boys take their ladies to a health spa, but Lucy follows them and complicates matters. When a band strikes up, Mabel announces that Sadie is in the room and can do her "act". Lucy saves the day, pretending to be Sadie and hiding her secret. Sadie then cuts up Mabel's dress and tosses her into a swimming pool. Tim and Eddie decide not to go fishing again.

== Cast ==
- William Bendix as Timothy 'Tim' McGuerin
- Joe Sawyer as Eddie Corbett
- Marjorie Woodworth as Lucy 'The Brooklyn Orchid' Gibbs
- Grace Bradley as Sadie McGuerin
- Richard "Skeets" Gallagher as Tommy Lyman Goodweek
- Florine McKinney as Mabel Cooney
- Leonid Kinskey as Ignatz Rachkowsky
- Rex Evans as Sterling, McGuerin's Butler
- Jack Norton as Jonathan McFeeder
- Ray Walker as Orchestra Leader/Emcee
