= Yanks Ahoy =

1943 film by Kurt Neumann

- Theatrical release poster
- Directed by: Kurt Neumann
- Screenplay by: Earle Snell; Clarence Marks
- Produced by: Fred Guiol; Hal Roach
- Starring: William Tracy; Joe Sawyer; Marjorie Woodworth; Minor Watson; Frank Faylen
- Cinematography: Robert Pittack
- Edited by: Richard C. Currier
- Music by: Edward Ward
- Production company: Hal Roach Studios
- Distributed by: United Artists
- Release date: June 29, 1943
- Running time: 60 minutes
- Country: United States
- Language: English

Yanks Ahoy is a 1943 American comedy film directed by Kurt Neumann and written by Earle Snell and Clarence Marks. The film stars William Tracy, Joe Sawyer, Marjorie Woodworth, Minor Watson and Frank Faylen. The film was released on June 29, 1943, by United Artists.

== Plot ==
Sgt. Dorian 'Dodo' Doubleday (William Tracy) and Sgt. Ames (Joe Sawyer) attempt to attract the affections of Phyllis Arden (Marjorie Woodworth) while the ship they're on tracks a Japanese submarine in this comedy romp.

== Cast ==
- William Tracy as Sgt. Dorian 'Dodo' Doubleday
- Joe Sawyer as Sgt. Ames
- Marjorie Woodworth as Phyllis Arden
- Minor Watson as Capt. Scott
- Frank Faylen as Quartermaster Jenkins
- Walter Woolf King as Capt. Gillis
- Romaine Callender as Col. Elliott
- Robert Kent as Lt. Reeves
