= Cheers for Miss Bishop =

1941 film by Tay Garnett

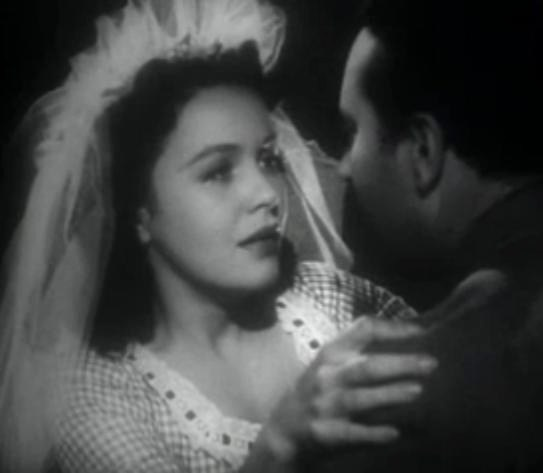
- Scene from film
- Directed by: Tay Garnett
- Screenplay by: Sheridan Gibney; Adelaide Heilbron; Stephen Vincent Benét (screen adaptation)
- Based on: Miss Bishop; 1933 novel by Bess Streeter Aldrich
- Produced by: Richard A. Rowland
- Starring: Martha Scott; William Gargan; Edmund Gwenn
- Cinematography: Hal Mohr
- Edited by: William F. Claxton
- Music by: Edward Ward
- Color process: Black and white
- Production company: Richard A. Rowland Productions
- Distributed by: United Artists
- Release date: February 21, 1941
- Running time: 95 minutes
- Country: United States
- Language: English
- Budget: $650,000

Cheers for Miss Bishop is a 1941 American drama film based on the novel Miss Bishop by Bess Streeter Aldrich. It was directed by Tay Garnett, produced by Richard A. Rowland and released through United Artists. Martha Scott stars in the title role, and the other cast members include William Gargan, Edmund Gwenn, Sterling Holloway, Dorothy Peterson, Marsha Hunt, Don Douglas and Sidney Blackmer.

== Plot ==
Ella Bishop, a retired teacher, recalls the events of her life. In the 1880s, she is a freshman at Midwestern University living with her mother and her vixenish cousin Amy. Ella is an inhibited girl whose frustration grows as she approaches womanhood. She dreams of becoming a teacher. When she graduates from Midwestern, she is thrilled when its president, Professor Corcoran, offers her a faculty position.

Ella becomes engaged to lawyer Delbert Thompson, but he is led astray by Amy and eventually must marry her, despite loving Ella. After Amy becomes pregnant, Delbert abandons her. Amy dies in childbirth, leaving Ella to care for Amy's daughter Hope. When Hope is an adult, she marries Richard and they move away and have a daughter named Gretchen. Ella also has a romance with another teacher, the unhappily married John Stevens, whose wife refuses to grant him a divorce for religious reasons, forcing Ella to end the relationship. Later, she is distressed to learn that John has been killed.

Through all the years, Ella is supported by her friend Sam Peters, a local grocer who loves her. Another source of support is Professor Corcoran, who persuades her to stay when she considers leaving. His death is a blow to Ella.

As Ella reaches old age, she reflects back and realizes that she allowed the years to pass without achieving what she believes to be true fulfillment. When the new college president pressures her to finally retire, she agrees. However, her moment of triumph arrives when her many successful students from the past return to attend a testimonial dinner in her honor.

== Cast ==
- Martha Scott as Ella Bishop
- William Gargan as Sam Peters
- Edmund Gwenn as Professor Corcoran
- Sterling Holloway as Chris Jensen
- Dorothy Peterson as Mrs. Bishop
- Sidney Blackmer as John Stevens
- Mary Anderson as Amy Saunders
- Donald Douglas as Delbert Thompson
- Marsha Hunt as Hope Thompson
- John Archer as Richard Clark (as Ralph Bowman)
- Lois Ranson as Gretchen Clark
- Rosemary De Camp as Minna Fields
- Knox Manning as Anton Radcheck
- John Arledge as 'Snapper' MacRae
- Jack Mulhall as Professor Carter
- Howard C. Hickman as Professor Lancaster (as Howard Hickman)
- Helen MacKellar as Miss Patton
- William Farnum as Judge Peters
- Anna Mills as Mrs. Peters
- John Hamilton as President Watts
- Pierre Watkin as President Crowder
- Charles Judels as Cecco
- Sue Moore as Stena
- Rand Brooks as 'Buzz' Wheelwright
- Mary Field as Mary, the Dressmaker

== Production ==
Scholars such as David Bordwell have noted Cheers for Miss Bishop as one of the first films to incorporate autobiographical voiceover in its use of flashback narrative as Ella remembers her life from her graduation at Midwestern University in the 1880s to her retirement in the 1930s. Director Tay Garnett employed fading transitions to symbolize the change in time. The film's makeup director Don L. Cash aged the actors distinctly through decades.

== Reception ==
In a contemporary review for The New York Times, critic Bosley Crowther wrote:

These are bitter times, when looking backward is much more pleasant for a lot of people than looking ahead. And that is why a goodly number will probably find much comfort and delight in Richard Rowland's sentimental survey of a simple and homely life well-spent ... For there is nothing about this Miss Bishop and the even and ordered world in which she lived to disturb or upset the thoughts of any one in this hectic day. In fact, there is little about her to disturb anything, save perhaps a random tear. 'Cheers for Miss Bishop' is decidedly a lavendered and lace-adorned memorial to a sweet and tender way of life now spent. ... True sentiment is a rare thing, and we wouldn't make light of it. But the sentiment in this picture is heavily overdone. Someone was saying that Miss Bishop is the feminine Mr. Chips. With all due respect to her gender, we definitely say she is not.

== Adaptations ==
Cheers for Miss Bishop was adapted as a radio play on the March 17, 1941 broadcast of Lux Radio Theater with Martha Scott and William Gargan reprising their film roles, and on the November 6, 1946 broadcast of Academy Award Theater starring Olivia de Havilland. Scott also reprised the role in a radio adaptation for Hallmark Playhouse in 1949.

== Awards ==
Cheers for Miss Bishop earned Edward Ward an Academy Award nomination for Best Scoring of a Dramatic Film. He was also nominated for scoring two other 1941 films, Tanks a Million and All-American Co-Ed. Ward earned seven Oscar nominations between 1939 and 1944, including one for the score of Phantom of the Opera (1943).
