= Marjorie Woodworth =

American actress (1919–2000)

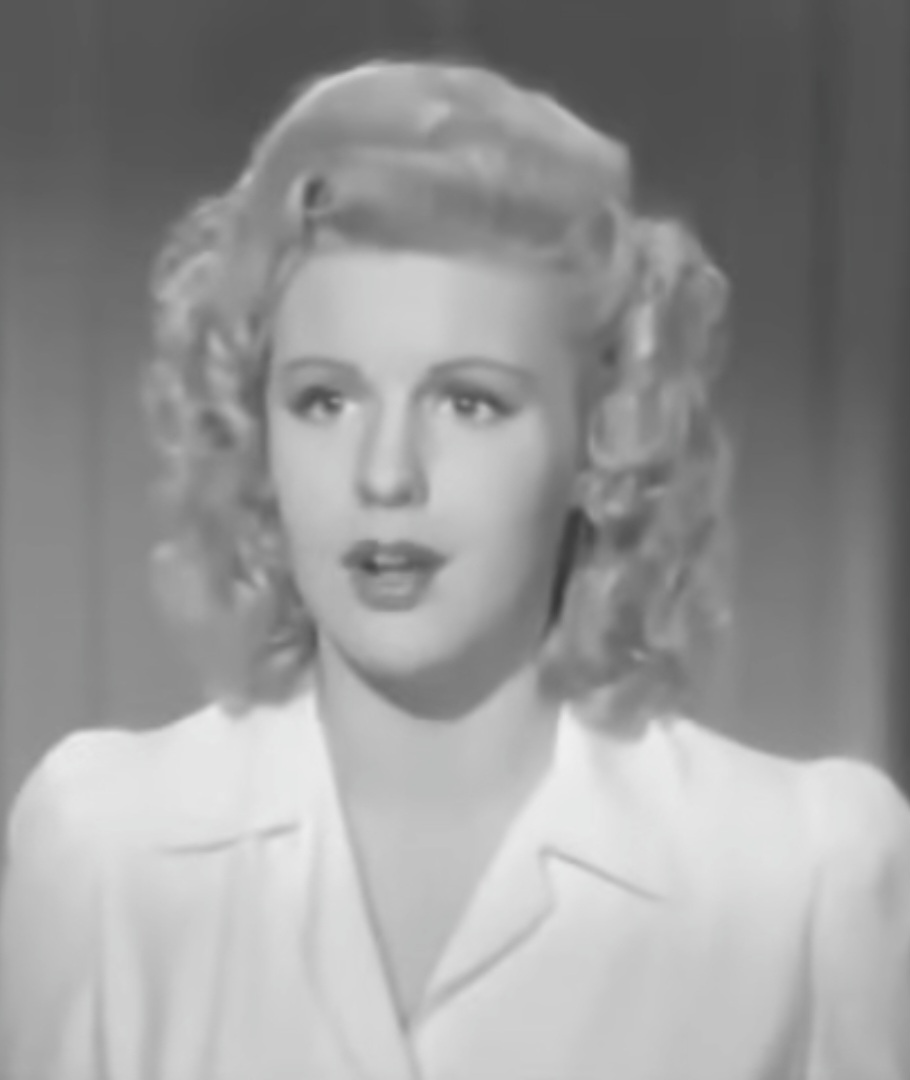
- Woodworth in Niagara Falls (1941)
- Born: June 5, 1919; Inglewood, California
- Died: August 23, 2000 (aged 81); Inglewood, California
- Resting place: Inglewood Park Cemetery
- Occupation: Actress
- Years active: 1938–1954

Marjorie Woodworth (June 5, 1919 – August 23, 2000) was an American actress.

== Early life ==
Born on June 5, 1921, in Inglewood, California, Whitworth was the daughter of city attorney Clyde Whitworth. Her lineage was Irish and Norwegian. After being educated in Inglewood's schools, she was a drum majorette at the University of Southern California, where for six months she studied anthropology. She also studied dramatics and psychology before left the university after two years to spend more time on stage and in films.

== Career ==
Woodworth appeared in the films Everybody Sing, Dancing Co-ed, Dance, Girl, Dance, Road Show, Broadway Limited, then signed with Hal Roach Studios where she appeared in many of the Hal Roach Streamliners such as Niagara Falls, All-American Co-Ed, Brooklyn Orchid, Flying with Music, The McGuerins from Brooklyn, Prairie Chickens, Yanks Ahoy.

Leaving Hal Roach, she had smaller roles in A Wave, a WAC and a Marine, Salty O'Rourke, You Came Along, In Fast Company and Decoy.

Woodworth's work on stage included appearing in a road show that was connected with the film Alexander's Ragtime Band and figure-skating in an act at the Paramount Theater in Los Angeles.

== Personal life and death ==
Woodworth was married to actor Michael Kostrick. She died in 2000 and was buried in Inglewood Park Cemetery.
