= Fall In =

1942 film by Kurt Neumann

- Theatrical release poster
- Directed by: Kurt Neumann
- Screenplay by: Eugene Conrad; Edward E. Seabrook
- Produced by: Fred Guiol; Hal Roach
- Starring: William Tracy; Joe Sawyer; Robert Barrat; Jean Porter; Arthur Hunnicutt
- Cinematography: Robert Pittack
- Edited by: Richard C. Currier
- Music by: Edward Ward
- Production company: Hal Roach Studios
- Distributed by: United Artists
- Release date: November 20, 1942
- Running time: 45 minutes
- Country: United States
- Language: English

Fall In is a 1942 American comedy film directed by Kurt Neumann and written by Eugene Conrad and Edward E. Seabrook. The film stars William Tracy, Joe Sawyer, Robert Barrat, Jean Porter and Arthur Hunnicutt. The film was released on November 20, 1942, by United Artists.

== Plot ==
On November 11, 1942, Congress approved lowering the draft age to 18 and raising the upper limit to age 37. Due to the expected increase in the number of new soldiers, more officers are sought. Five sergeants of the regiment are selected for commission as officers, including Staff Sergeant "Dodo" Doubleday, but excluding Sergeant Ames.

Prior to Dodo's officer training, the two sergeants must train two platoons from a new intake of draftees from backwoods areas. Using the strengths of the backwoodsmen, S/Sgt. Doubleday excels again. His platoon is selected to perform military police duties on a weekend furlough.

Mr Arnold Benedict has offered his large house for the entertainment of the soldiers, but Joan, Dodo's girlfriend and a hostess discovers they are really a Nazi spy ring obtaining information from the soldiers.

== Cast ==
- William Tracy as S/Sgt. Dorian 'Dodo' Doubleday
- Joe Sawyer as Sgt. William Ames
- Robert Barrat as Col. Elliott
- Jean Porter as Joan
- Arthur Hunnicutt as Luke Hatfield
- Rebel Randall as Lydia Hummock
- Frank Faylen as Capt. Gillis
- Clyde Fillmore as Arnold Benedict
