= Two Knights from Brooklyn =

- Directed by: Kurt Neumann
- Written by: Clarence Marks and Earle Snell
- Produced by: Hal Roach and Fred Guiol
- Starring: William Bendix; Joe Sawyer; Grace Bradley
- Distributed by: Favorite Films
- Release date: 1949
- Country: United States
- Language: English

Two Knights from Brooklyn is a 1949 film directed by Kurt Neumann and starring William Bendix, Joe Sawyer, and Grace Bradley. It chronicles the adventures of two average "Joes" that form a taxi company in Brooklyn, foil the notorious gangster, "The Frisco Ghost", and live through wives and girlfriend problems.

The film was compiled from two of Hal Roach's Streamliners short features, both originally directed by Neumann a few years before.

== Plot summary ==
Taxi drivers Tim McGuerin (William Bendix) and Eddie Corbett (Joe Sawyer) gets an award for successfully expanding their company to encomprise three hundred cars, from starting out with only one when they started their business in 1928.

During the ceremony, Corbett is asked by his newly hired young secretary, Lucy Gibbs, how he and his partner managed to achieve this goal, and there is a flashback to 1928, when McGuerin pursued the woman who would later become his wife, burlesque performing artist Sadie O'Brien (Grace Bradley). This part of the story is fetched from the other previous movie: "Taxi, Mister". While McGuerin's interest in Sadie increases, her alluring appearance also catches the eyes of notorious gangster Louis Glorio (Sheldon Leonard), and the two men become rivals in the pursuit of Sadie's interest.

The police discover that the gangster is the man behind the wanted anonymous criminal Frisco Ghost, and after a series of events the rivalry ends with Louis being arrested by the police.

As McGuerin tells his story to Lucy Gibbs, Sadie accidentally overhears some of the most dubious parts as the intercom is on. She becomes jealous, thinking that Lucy is trying to get her hands on her husband. Corbett gets problems too, being pursued by Marcia Morrison, who is only interested in him because his recent financial success. This sidetrack soon involves the rest of the cast and they all end up at some kind of health spa.

== Cast ==
- William Bendix as Tim McGuerin
- Joe Sawyer as Eddie Corbett
- Grace Bradley as Sadie O'Brien
