= Taxi, Mister =

1943 film by Kurt Neumann

- Theatrical release poster
- Directed by: Kurt Neumann
- Screenplay by: Earle Snell; Clarence Marks
- Produced by: Fred Guiol; Hal Roach
- Starring: William Bendix; Grace Bradley; Joe Sawyer; Sheldon Leonard; Joe Devlin; Jack Norton; Frank Faylen; Mike Mazurki; Sig Arno; Clyde Fillmore; Jimmy Conlin; Lew Kelly; Iris Adrian
- Cinematography: Robert Pittack
- Edited by: Richard C. Currier
- Music by: Edward Ward
- Production company: Hal Roach Studios
- Distributed by: United Artists
- Release date: April 16, 1943
- Running time: 46 minutes
- Country: United States
- Language: English

Taxi, Mister is a 1943 American comedy film directed by Kurt Neumann and written by Earle Snell and Clarence Marks. The film stars William Bendix, Grace Bradley, Joe Sawyer, Sheldon Leonard, Joe Devlin, Jack Norton, Frank Faylen, Mike Mazurki, Sig Arno, Clyde Fillmore, Jimmy Conlin, Lew Kelly and Iris Adrian. The film was released on April 16, 1943, by United Artists.

This was the third and last of the so-called Taxi Comedies series, which featured Bendix, Sawyer, and Bradley playing the same characters. The first two films were Brooklyn Orchid and The McGuerins from Brooklyn.

== Cast ==
- William Bendix as Tim McGuerin
- Grace Bradley as Sadie McGuerin aka O'Brien
- Joe Sawyer as Eddie Corbett
- Sheldon Leonard as Gangster Louis Glorio / The Frisco Ghost
- Joe Devlin as Henchman Stretch
- Jack Norton as Reginald Van Nostrum
- Frank Faylen as Henchman Silk
- Mike Mazurki as Henchman Joe
- Sig Arno as Henri, Waiter
- Clyde Fillmore as Alderman Hogan
- Jimmy Conlin as Cassidy
- Lew Kelly as Man with the Invisible Dog Act
- Iris Adrian as Diner Waitress
- Lona Andre as Chorus Girl
