= Lincoln American Tower =

Historic skyscraper in Tennessee, United States

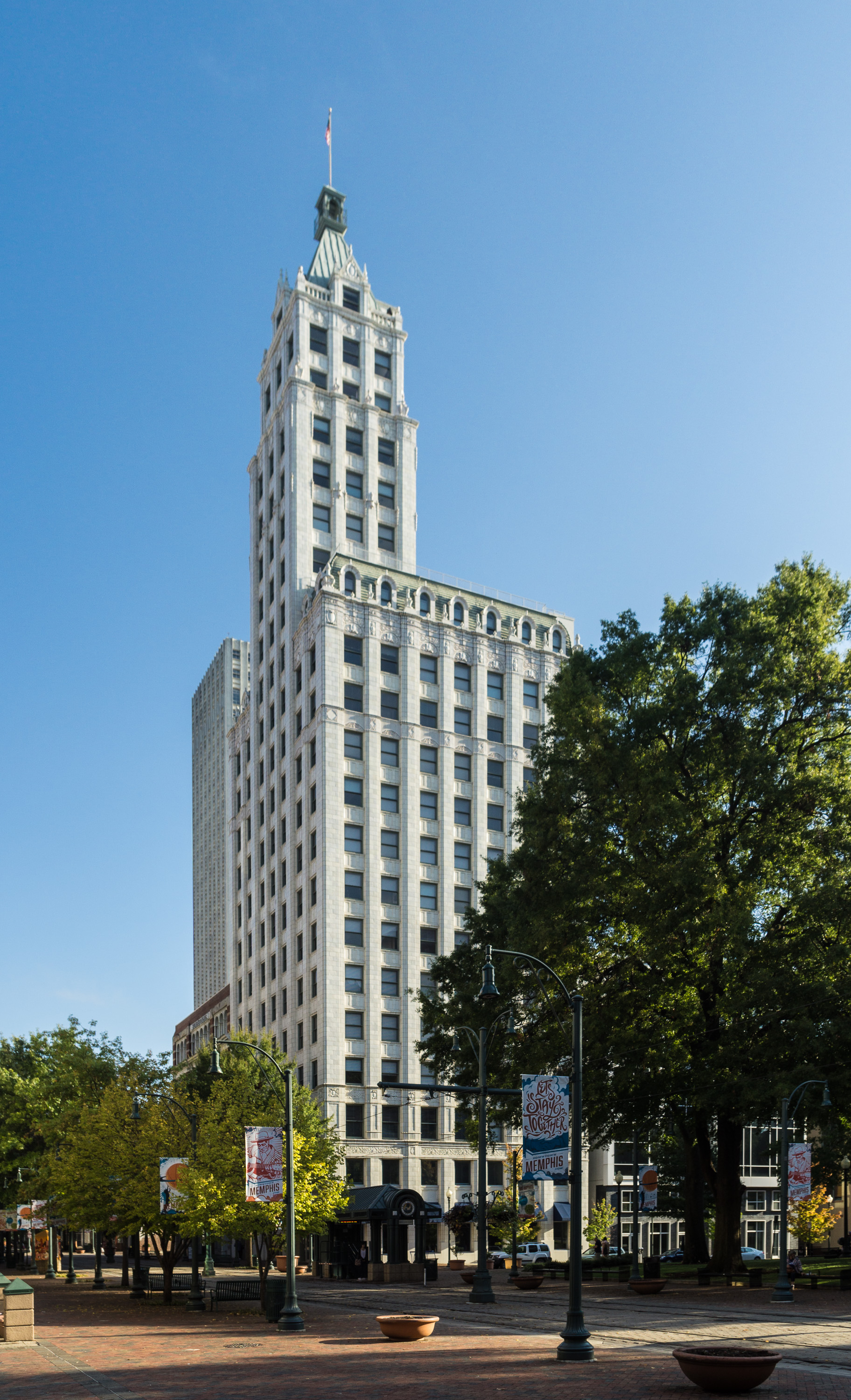
- Interactive map of the Lincoln American Tower area
- Alternative names: Columbian Mutual Life Tower

General information
- Architectural style: Late Gothic Revival
- Location: Memphis, Tennessee
- Coordinates: 35°8′48.15″N 90°3′6.98″W
- Completed: 1924

Height
- Architectural: 290 feet (88 m)
- Tip: 325 feet (99 m)

Technical details
- Floor count: 22
- Floor area: 85,500 square feet (7,940 m^{2})

Design and construction
- Architects: Boyer & Baum; Issac Albert Baum

Other information
- Public transit: MATA; Main Street Line; Riverfront Loop
- Lincoln American Tower
- U.S. National Register of Historic Places
- Location within Tennessee Location within the United States
- Location: 60 N. Main St., Memphis, Tennessee
- NRHP reference No.: 78002631
- Added to NRHP: July 24, 1978

The Lincoln American Tower (originally Columbian Mutual Tower) is a 22-story building located at the corner of North Main and Court streets in Memphis, Tennessee. It is also a historical landmark, one of the first steel frame skyscrapers built in Memphis. The tower underwent a six-year refurbishing project starting in 2002, and despite a fire in 2006, is now open and accepting tenants.

The building currently features 31 residential apartments, 3 floors of commercial offices, and New York–based Ceriello Fine Foods on the ground floor.

== History ==
The site itself has a unique history, as it is located near the location of Irving Block Prison, which was on the north side of Court Square, which was used by the Union Army to house Confederate sympathizers during the Civil War. Freeing prisoners from Irving Block Prison was one of the three major objectives of Maj. Gen. Nathan Bedford Forrest's raid in the Second Battle of Memphis.

In 1924, the president of the Memphis branch of the Columbia Mutual Insurance Company (later renamed to the Lincoln American Insurance Company), Lloyd Binford, had the gleaming white tower built overlooking Court Square. Binford later made an infamous name for himself across the country as head of the Memphis Censor Board, which he ran from his own offices on the top floor of the building.

In 1978, the National Register of Historic Places listed the Lincoln American Tower.

On October 6, 2006, the building was damaged by fire after embers from a major fire at the nearby First United Methodist Church were carried several blocks by strong winds. The result lit the top few floors of the building on fire, including the roof, and filled much of downtown Memphis with smoke. The nearby Court Annex building was destroyed in the same fire.

Despite the fire, the renovation of the building continued, and the first tenants in 2008 were the Plough Foundation, who leased 4,358 square feet (404.9 m^{2}) of space in the building.

== Design ==
The building’s frame is made of steel and is covered in concrete. This Gothic revival building has an exterior covered in a white terra cotta glaze. The building features pilasters, four for structural support and three for visual effect. The reveals on the pilasters show where the steel frame is within the building. This tower features decorative bas-reliefs across the façade; the most noteworthy one is the two women and two children modeled after Lloyd Binford's children. Piers lead up to the pyramidal cap. There are highly ornamented cornices around the building.

The tower is a replica of New York's Woolworth Building, at one-third scale.

== Columbian Mutual Life Assurance Society ==
The Columbian Mutual Life Assurance Society was founded in 1903 as the "Columbian Woodmen". Membership was open to men and women. In 1923 there were 24,039 members in 831 lodges spread out across South Carolina, Georgia, Florida, Alabama, Mississippi, Louisiana, Arkansas, Texas, Oklahoma, Missouri, Tennessee, Kentucky, Illinois and Pennsylvania. Under National President Lloyd T. Binford a number of changes were made, including the change of name to the Columbian Mutual Life Assurance Society, the dropping of fraternal titles and a move of the headquarters from Atlanta to Memphis.

== See also ==
- List of tallest buildings in Memphis
- List of North American fraternal benefit orders
- National Register of Historic Places listings in Shelby County, Tennessee

Preceded by Exchange Building	Tallest Building in Memphis; 1924 - 1930; 88m	Succeeded by Sterick Building
