= Frank Faylen =

American actor (1905–1985)

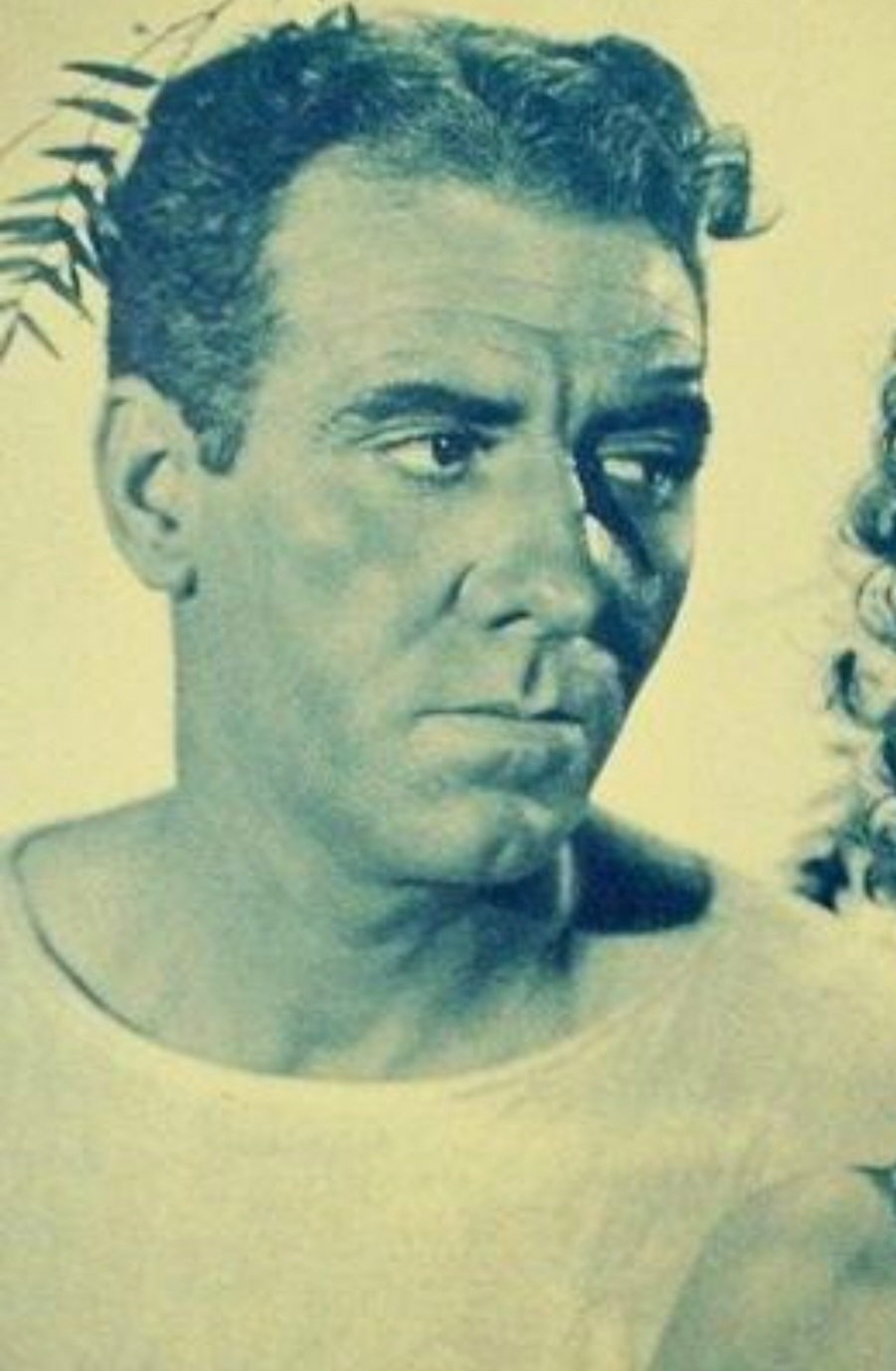
- Faylen in That Nazty Nuisance (1943)
- Born: Charles Francis Ruf; December 8, 1905; St. Louis, Missouri, U.S.
- Died: August 2, 1985 (aged 79); Burbank, California, U.S.
- Resting place: San Fernando Mission Cemetery
- Occupation: Actor
- Years active: 1936–1978
- Spouse: Carol Hughes (m. 1928)
- Children: 2

Frank Faylen (born Charles Francis Ruf; December 8, 1905 – August 2, 1985) was an American film and television actor. Largely a bit player and character actor, he occasionally played more fleshed-out supporting roles during his forty-two year acting career, during which he appeared in some 223 film and television productions, often without credit.

== Early life ==
Born in St. Louis, Missouri, Faylen began his acting career as an infant appearing with his vaudeville-performing parents on stage. The family lived on a showboat, and performed throughout his youth. His elementary education came in Chicago, and he attended preparatory school in Kirkwood, Missouri. He had four brothers.

== Career ==
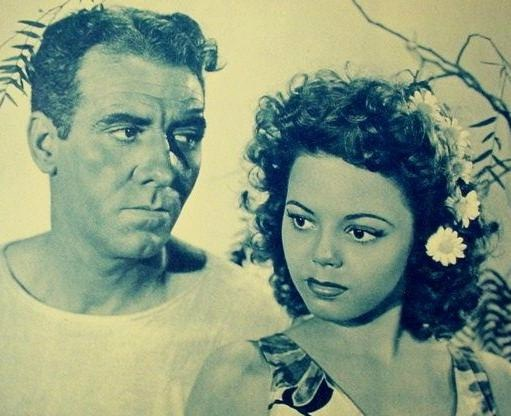
Frank Faylen and Jean Porter in That Nazty Nuisance (1943)

Faylen's parents had been retired seven years when he, at age 21, convinced them to resume their act so that he could join them. They performed for four years, ending when his father died.

Faylen became a stage actor at 18 and eventually began working in films in the 1930s. He began playing a number of bit parts for Warner Bros., then freelanced for other studios in gradually larger character roles. He appeared as Walt Disney's musical conductor in The Reluctant Dragon, and as a stern railroad official in the Laurel and Hardy comedy A-Haunting We Will Go. Faylen and Laurel and Hardy supporting player Charlie Hall were teamed briefly by Monogram Pictures.

Faylen's breakthrough came in 1945, where he was cast as Bim, the cynical nurse at Bellevue's alcoholic ward in The Lost Weekend. In the following year, he played Ernie Bishop, the friendly taxi driver in Frank Capra's 1946 film It's a Wonderful Life. Faylen's career also stretched to television, where he appeared in a number of western series, such as Maverick and Zane Grey Theater, as well as playing series regular long-suffering grocer Herbert T. Gillis, the father of the title character on the 1950s-'60s television sitcom The Many Loves of Dobie Gillis. He also played Bert Hollinger in the ABC comedy That Girl.

In 1968, he had a small part in the Barbra Streisand film Funny Girl. Faylen appeared in almost 200 films.

He has a star at 6201 Hollywood Boulevard in the Television section of the Hollywood Walk of Fame. It was dedicated on February 8, 1960.

== Personal life ==
Faylen was married to Carol Hughes, an actress. Their two daughters, Catherine and Carol, are retired actresses. Catherine "Kay" Faylen was Regis Philbin's first wife.

== Death ==
Faylen died from pneumonia in Burbank, California, in 1985. He was interred in the San Fernando Mission Cemetery in Mission Hills, Los Angeles, California.

== Selected filmography ==
- Road Gang (1936) as Police Radio Dispatcher (uncredited)
- The Sky Parade (1936) as Pilot (uncredited)
- Border Flight (1936) as Jimmie
- Bullets or Ballots (1936) as Gatley - Pinball Racketeer (uncredited)
- China Clipper (1936) as Weatherman (uncredited)
- Down the Stretch (1936) as Ben - Bookie (uncredited)
- All American Chump (1936) as Reporter (uncredited)
- King of Hockey (1936) as Swede, Nick's Associate
- Night Waitress (1936) as Policeman at Torre's (uncredited)
- Gold Diggers of 1937 (1936) as Man Shaving on Train (uncredited)
- Smart Blonde (1937) as Ambulance Driver (uncredited)
- Midnight Court (1937) as Reporter (uncredited)
- Marked Woman (1937) as 2nd Cabbie (uncredited)
- The Cherokee Strip (1937) as Henchman Joe Brady
- The Go Getter (1937) as Country Club Man #2 (uncredited)
- San Quentin (1937) as Convict Envying Hoffman (uncredited)
- Kid Galahad (1937) as Barney
- The Case of the Stuttering Bishop (1937) as Charlie Downs
- Ever Since Eve (1937) as Bandit Leader at Monteray Tavern (uncredited)
- Dance Charlie Dance (1937) as Ted Parks
- Public Wedding (1937) as Trainman (scenes deleted)
- They Won't Forget (1937) as Reporter
- Talent Scout (1937) as Master of Ceremonies (scenes deleted)
- That Certain Woman (1937) as Reporter (uncredited)
- Wine, Women and Horses (1937) as Horse Buyer (uncredited)
- Back in Circulation (1937) as James Maxwell - a Reporter (uncredited)
- Headin' East (1937) as Joe
- The Invisible Menace (1938) as Private of the Guard
- No Time to Marry (1938) as Waxler
- Four's a Crowd (1938) as Taxi Driver (uncredited)
- Too Hot to Handle (1938) as Assistant Dubber (uncredited)
- Idiot's Delight (1939) as Ed (uncredited)
- You Can't Get Away with Murder (1939) as Boat Tour Guide (uncredited)
- The Story of Vernon and Irene Castle (1939) as Adjutant (uncredited)
- The Flying Irishman (1939) as New York Mechanic (uncredited)
- Women in the Wind (1939) as Chuck - the Mechanic (uncredited)
- Lucky Night (1939) as Play Palace Announcer (uncredited)
- It's a Wonderful World (1939) as Peters - Stagehand (uncredited)
- Five Came Back (1939) as Photographer (uncredited)
- Waterfront (1939) as Skids Riley
- The Star Maker (1939) as First Reporter
- Thunder Afloat (1939) as Petty Officer (uncredited)
- No Place to Go (1939) as Pete Shafter
- Reno (1939) as J. Hezmer "Hezzy" Briggs
- Nick Carter, Master Detective (1939) as Pete
- Gone with the Wind (1939) as Soldier Aiding Dr. Meade (uncredited)
- Invisible Stripes (1939) as Steve - Henchman on Bank Job (uncredited)
- Married and in Love (1940) as Jim Carter, Man in Bar
- The Grapes of Wrath (1940) as Tim
- The Fighting 69th (1940) as Engineer Sergeant at Cave-In (uncredited)
- Castle on the Hudson (1940) as Guard Who is Slugged (uncredited)
- Millionaire Playboy (1940) (scenes deleted)
- Curtain Call (1940) as Spike Malone
- Saturday's Children (1940) as Cab Driver (uncredited)
- Edison, the Man (1940) as Galbreath (uncredited)
- La Conga Nights (1940) as Jeepers Peepers (uncredited)
- Brother Orchid (1940) as Parkway Biltmore Desk Clerk (uncredited)
- Pop Always Pays (1940) as Minerva Auto Loan Cashier (uncredited)
- They Drive by Night (1940) as Driver in Cafe (uncredited)
- Margie (1940) as Mr. Leffingwell
- No Time for Comedy (1940) as Cab Driver
- City for Conquest (1940) as Band Conductor and Emcee (uncredited)
- East of the River (1940) as Tour Guide (uncredited)
- Blame It on Love (1940) as Studio Electrician
- The Reluctant Dragon (1941) as Frank - Orchestra Leader (uncredited)
- Come Live with Me (1941) as Waiter
- Footsteps in the Dark (1941) as Gus - Taxi Driver (uncredited)
- Knockout (1941) as Fighter in Locker Room (uncredited)
- Model Wife (1941) as Master of Ceremonies (uncredited)
- Thieves Fall Out (1941) as Pick
- Affectionately Yours (1941) as Ambulance Driver (uncredited)
- Blossoms in the Dust (1941) as Man With Man Carrying Dead Child (uncredited)
- Sergeant York (1941) as But! Boy (uncredited)
- Father Steps Out (1941) as Tall Hobo 'King', a.k.a. The King of Siam
- International Squadron (1941) as Process Server (uncredited)
- Tanks a Million (1941) as Pvt. Skivic
- Let's Go Collegiate (1941) as Speed Dorman
- Top Sergeant Mulligan (1941) as Pat Dolan
- Unholy Partners (1941) as Roger Ordway (uncredited)
- H. M. Pulham, Esq. (1941) as Marine Sergeant (uncredited)
- Steel Against the Sky (1941) as Egg Man in Diner (uncredited)
- Hay Foot (1942) as Major (uncredited)
- Joe Smith, American (1942) as Man in Waiting Room with Matches (uncredited)
- Dr. Kildare's Victory (1942) as Peter 'Pete' Taylor (uncredited)
- Mokey (1942) as Police Desk Sergeant (uncredited)
- Whispering Ghosts (1942) as Curly the Announcer (uncredited)
- Yankee Doodle Dandy (1942) as Sergeant on Parade - Last Scene (uncredited)
- Maisie Gets Her Man (1942) as Second Stage Manager (uncredited)
- Tough as They Come (1942) as Collector (uncredited)
- The Pride of the Yankees (1942) as Yankee Third Base Coach (uncredited)
- Wings for the Eagle (1942) as Bandleader (uncredited)
- A-Haunting We Will Go (1942) as Train Detective (uncredited)
- Wake Island (1942) as Marine Finding Skipper's Litter (uncredited)
- Somewhere I'll Find You (1942) as Slim, Army Driver (uncredited)
- The Palm Beach Story (1942) as Taxi Driver (uncredited)
- Across the Pacific (1942) as Sidewalk Toy Vendor (uncredited)
- Fall In (1942) as Capt. Gillis
- Star Spangled Rhythm (1942) as Soldier - 'That Old Black Magic' Number (uncredited)
- The McGuerins from Brooklyn (1942) as Crap Table Stickman (uncredited)
- Silver Skates (1943) as Eddie
- Dixie Dugan (1943) as Soldier (uncredited)
- Salute for Three (1943) as Buzz's Soldier Friend (uncredited)
- Prairie Chickens (1943) as Henchman Clem (uncredited)
- Slightly Dangerous (1943) as Gateman (uncredited)
- The Falcon Strikes Back (1943) as Cecil - First Hobo (uncredited)
- Follow the Band (1943) as Brooks (uncredited)
- Taxi, Mister (1943) as Henchman Silk
- Mission to Moscow (1943) as Reporter (uncredited)
- Good Morning, Judge (1943) as Ben Pollard
- Three Hearts for Julia (1943) as Meek Gateman (uncredited)
- That Nazty Nuisance (1943) as Seaman Benson
- Get Going (1943) as Hank
- Yanks Ahoy (1943) as Quartermaster Jenkins
- Young Ideas (1943) as Reporter (uncredited)
- The Good Fellows (1943) as Brody (uncredited)
- Thank Your Lucky Stars (1943) as Sailor (uncredited)
- Corvette K-225 (1943) as Shipyard Painter (uncredited)
- The Unknown Guest (1943) as Truck Driver (uncredited)
- Mystery of the 13th Guest (1943) as Speed Dugan a.k.a. McGinnis
- She's for Me (1943) as Keys
- The Gang's All Here (1943) as Marine Sergeant (uncredited)
- A Guy Named Joe (1943) as Major (uncredited)
- Tarzan's Desert Mystery (1943) as Achmed (uncredited)
- Standing Room Only (1944) as Cab Driver (uncredited)
- See Here, Private Hargrove (1944) as Military Policeman (uncredited)
- Address Unknown (1944) as Jimmie Blake
- And the Angels Sing (1944) as Holman
- Andy Hardy's Blonde Trouble (1944) as Taxi Driver #2 (uncredited)
- The Canterville Ghost (1944) as Lieutenant Kane
- The National Barn Dance (1944) as Musical Team Member (uncredited)
- An American Romance (1944) as Bartender (uncredited)
- Bring on the Girls (1945) as Sailor
- Pride of the Marines (1945) as Patient on ward (uncredited)
- The Affairs of Susan (1945) as Brooklyn Boy (uncredited)
- You Came Along (1945) as Bellboy (uncredited)
- Incendiary Blonde (1945) as Hotel Clerk (uncredited)
- Duffy's Tavern (1945) as Customer (uncredited)
- The Lost Weekend (1945) as "Bim" Nolan, the nurse in the alcoholic ward
- Masquerade in Mexico (1945) as Brooklyn (uncredited)
- To Each His Own (1946) as Babe
- Two Years Before the Mast (1946) as Hansen
- The Blue Dahlia (1946) as Man Recommending a Motel
- The Well-Groomed Bride (1946) as Taxi Driver (uncredited)
- Our Hearts Were Growing Up (1946) as Federal Agent
- Blue Skies (1946) as Mack
- Cross My Heart (1946) as Fingerprint Expert (uncredited)
- It's a Wonderful Life (1946) as Ernie Bishop, the cab driver
- California (1947) as Whitey
- Easy Come, Easy Go (1947) as Boss
- Suddenly It's Spring (1947) as Harold Michaels
- Welcome Stranger (1947) as Bill Walters
- The Trouble with Women (1947) as Geeger
- The Perils of Pauline (1947) as Mr. Joe Gurt
- Road to Rio (1947) as Trigger
- Variety Girl (1947) as Himself
- Hazard (1948) as Oscar
- Race Street (1948) as Phil Dickson
- Blood on the Moon (1948) as Jake Pindalest
- Whispering Smith (1948) as Whitey Du Sang, a ruthless, gunslinging, train robbing cowboy
- The Nevadan (1950) as Jeff
- Francis (1950) as Sgt. Chillingbacker
- The Eagle and the Hawk (1950) as Red' Hyatt - Danzeeger's Foreman
- Convicted (1950) as Convict Ponti
- Copper Canyon (1950) as Mullins
- Fourteen Hours (1951) as Room Service Waiter
- Passage West (1951) as Curly
- Detective Story (1951) as Det. Gallagher
- My Favorite Spy (1951) as Newton
- The Sniper (1952) as Police Insp. Anderson
- The Lusty Men (1952) as Al Dawson
- Hangman's Knot (1952) as Cass Browne
- 99 River Street (1953) as Stan Hogan
- Red Garters (1954) as Billy Buckett
- Riot in Cell Block 11 (1954) as Commissioner Haskell
- The Lone Gun (1954) as Fairweather
- The Looters (1955) as Stan Leppich
- The McConnell Story (1955) as Sfc. Sykes
- Terror at Midnight (1956) as Fred Hill
- Away All Boats (1956) as Chief Phillip P. 'Pappy' Moran
- Everything but the Truth (1956) as 'Mac' McMillan
- Three Brave Men (1956) as Enos Warren
- 7th Cavalry (1957) as Sgt. Kruger
- Gunfight at the O.K. Corral (1957) as Cotton Wilson
- Dino (1957) as Frank Mandel
- Dick Powell's Zane Grey Theatre (1959) as Doc Alvarez
- North to Alaska (1960) as Arnie (uncredited)
- The Monkey's Uncle (1965) as Mr. Dearborne
- Fluffy (1965) as Catfish
- When the Boys Meet the Girls (1965) as Phin Gray
- The Beverly Hillbillies (1966, TV Series) as Marvin
- Petticoat Junction (1968, TV Series) as Ralph
- Funny Girl (1968) as Keeney
- Quincy, M.E. (1978, TV Series) as Janus (final appearance)
