= White Woman =

1933 film by Stuart Walker

- Directed by: Stuart Walker
- Written by: Norman Reilly Raine (play); Frank Butler (play); Samuel Hoffenstein; Gladys Lehman
- Produced by: E. Lloyd Sheldon (uncredited)
- Starring: Carole Lombard; Charles Laughton; Charles Bickford
- Edited by: Jane Loring
- Production company: Paramount Pictures
- Distributed by: Paramount Pictures
- Release date: November 10, 1933
- Running time: 68 minutes
- Country: United States
- Language: English

White Woman is a 1933 American pre-Code drama film directed by Stuart Walker and starring Carole Lombard, Charles Laughton, and Charles Bickford. The screenplay concerns a young widow who remarries and accompanies her husband to his remote jungle rubber plantation. It is based on the 1933 Broadway play Hangman's Whip, written by Norman Reilly Raine and Frank Butler.

One of hundreds of Paramount films held in limbo by Universal Studios, Universal gained ownership of Paramount features produced between 1929 and 1949. Paramount remade the film in 1939 as Island of Lost Men, with Anna May Wong, J. Carrol Naish and Broderick Crawford in the roles originated by Lombard, Laughton and Bickford. It was directed by Kurt Neumann.

== Plot ==
Judith Denning, a young widow, makes a living as a cafe singer in Malaysia. The colonial authorities threaten her with deportation for indecency, but she has nowhere else to go. Judith has a chance meeting with wealthy but lonely rubber plantation owner Horace Prin, who she agrees to marry in order to escape deportation.

Judith travels inland to Prin's plantation, where she discovers the Malay workers are poorly treated and ill-fed, while the white foremen are fugitives coerced into working far from the reach of the law. Prin acts as a tyrant, subjecting his subordinates to his capricious whim and cruel sense of humor. One of the foremen, Hambly, attempts to escape downriver. He is killed by Malay tribesmen hired by Prin, a fate shared by previous escapees. Judith quickly comes to resent Prin. She falls in love with David, a deserter from the British Army who has been trapped working for Prin. They announce their intention to run away together but are easily cowed by Prin. David is reassigned to a position upriver.

Prin's domination is upset by the arrival of Ballister, a strong-willed American hired to replace Hambly. He openly defies Prin and makes sexual advances towards Judith. One day, Malay chieftains visit Prin to negotiate a trade deal, but Prin arrogantly insults them. The Malays declare war. The upriver posts are the first to be attacked, and David narrowly escapes through the jungle to Prin's headquarters. Judith and David escape downriver together after Ballister foils Prin's attempts to sabotage their boat. Prin surveys his abandoned plantation. He remains confident that he can defend his plantation until he discovers his hidden defenses have been destroyed by a disgruntled employee. Now realizing his position is hopeless, he plays a game of poker with Ballister, his last remaining ally. The Malays close in and kill Ballister with a blowgun. Prin chastises Ballister for dying while Prin had a royal flush, and raves that he will always be "king of the river". He steps out onto the balcony and is killed by Malay spear-throwers.

== Cast ==
- Carole Lombard as Judith Denning
- Charles Laughton as Horace H. Prin
- Charles Bickford as Ballister
- Kent Taylor as David von Elst
- Percy Kilbride as Jakey
- James Bell as Hambly
- Charles Middleton as Fenton (as Charles B. Middleton)
- Claude King as C. M. Chisholm
- Ethel Griffies as Mrs. Chisholm
- Marc Lawrence as Connors

Uncredited cast members (alphabetically)

- Noble Johnson as Native Chief
- Tetsu Komai as Chisholm Servant
- Victor Wong as Waiter
