= Who Killed Doc Robbin =

1948 film by Bernard Carr

- Directed by: Bernard Carr
- Written by: Robert F. McGowan (story); Dorothy Reid; Maurice Geraghty
- Produced by: Hal Roach; Hal Roach, Jr. Robert F. McGowan
- Starring: Larry Olsen; Eilene Janssen; Gerald Perreau; Ardda Lynwood; Dale Belding
- Cinematography: John W. Boyle
- Edited by: Arthur Seid
- Distributed by: United Artists
- Release date: April 9, 1948
- Running time: 55 min.
- Country: United States
- Language: English

Who Killed Doc Robbin is a 1948 film directed by Bernard Carr and starring Larry Olsen, Billy Gray, and Renee Beard. It was produced by Hal Roach and Robert F. McGowan as a reimagining of their Our Gang series.

The film was one of "Hal Roach's Streamliners" features of the 1940s, running only 55 minutes, and was designed as a B-movie. Like most of Roach's latter-day output, Who Killed Doc Robbin, the sequel to 1947's Curley, was shot in Cinecolor. The film was released to theatres on April 9, 1948 by United Artists.

When Hal Roach sold Our Gang to Metro-Goldwyn-Mayer in 1938, he was contractually bound not to produce anymore kids comedies. When Roach decided that he wanted to produce Curley, he got MGM's permission by giving up his right to buy back the name Our Gang.

Both Curley and Who Killed Doc Robbin, performed poorly at the box office (as a result, Roach discontinued theatrical film production, turning his studio's efforts towards television), and when Roach bought back the rights to the 1927-1938 Our Gang shorts in 1949, he had to re-christen the series as The Little Rascals.

== Plot ==
Local scientist Dr. Hugo Robbin dies. Curley and his "gang" happen to have been key witnesses to several of the events, and the children's testimonies are told in flashback during the court case.

== Cast ==
- Larry Olsen as William "Curley" Benson
- Eilene Janssen as Betty
- Gerald Perreau as Dudley
- Ardda Lynwood as Ardda Benson
- Dale Belding as Speck Jones
- Virginia Grey as Ann Loring
- Don Castle as George, Defense Attorney
- George Zucco as Doc Hugo Robbin
- Brick Sullivan as Officer Calladay
- Paul Hurst as Jailer
- Whitford Kane as "Fix-it" Dan Cameron
- Wilton Graff as Prosecutor
- Claire Dubrey as Housekeeper
- Renee Beard as Dis
- Donald King as Dat
