= Columbian Mutual Life Assurance Society =

American fraternal benefit order

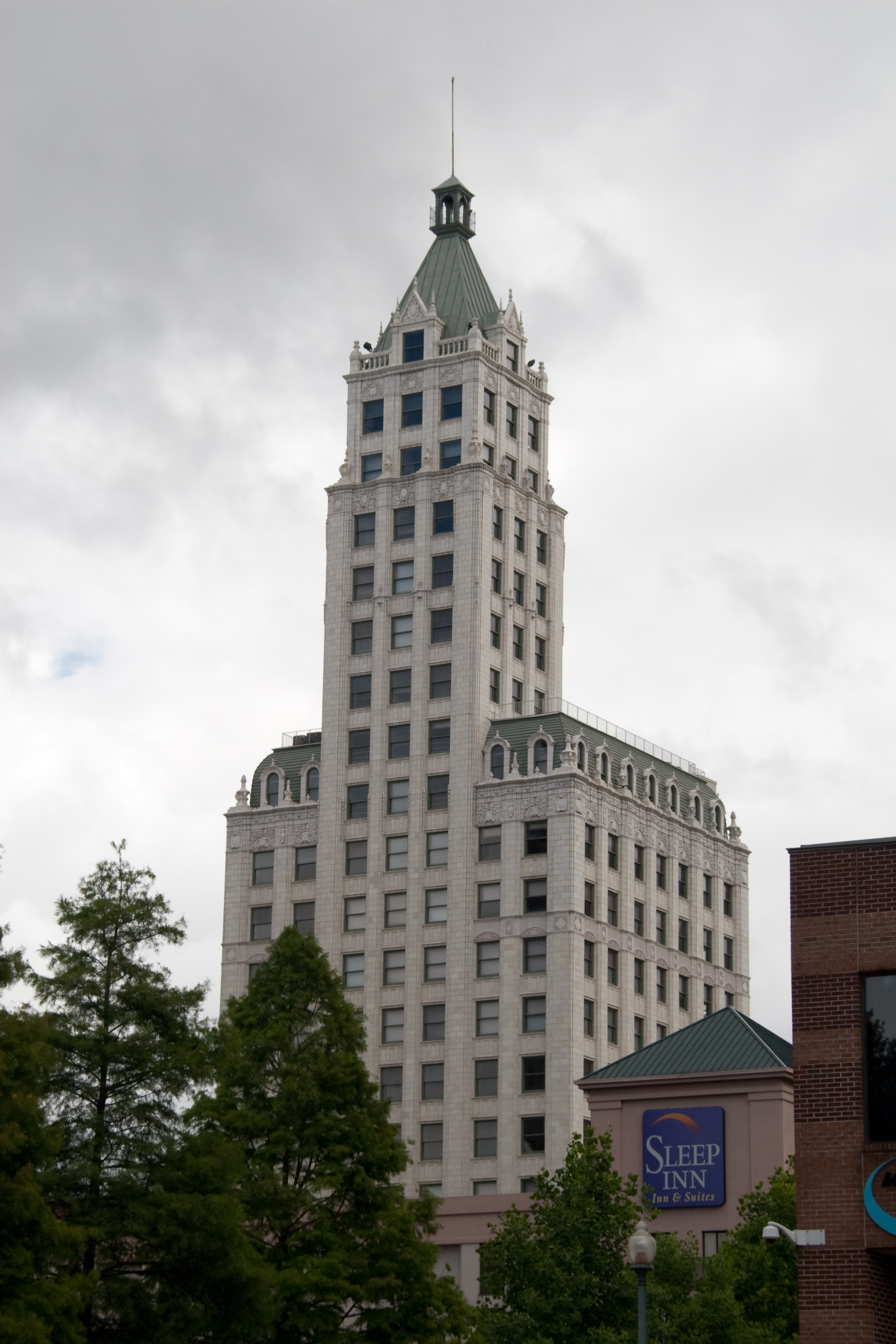
Lincoln American Tower (originally, the Columbian Mutual Tower), Memphis

Columbian Mutual Life Assurance Society (predecessor, Eminent Household of Columbian Woodmen; successor, Columbian Mutual Life Insurance Company; in 1965, Lincoln American Insurance Company) was an American fraternal benefit order. It was originally organized in 1903, under the laws of Georgia, as "Eminent Household of Columbian Woodmen" (sometimes referred to as "Columbian Woodmen of Georgia" or simply, "Columbian Woodmen". When this organization merged with the "Columbia Woodmen of Mississippi" in 1921, the name of the merged institutions was changed to "Columbian Mutual Life Assurance Society". In 1922, its home office moved to Memphis, Tennessee, where it erected a 22-story office building, known as Columbian Mutual Tower. The Society paid sick and death benefits and admitted both men and women. In 1924, it had 831 subordinate lodges with a benefit membership of 24,039.

== History ==
=== Society ===
"Columbian Woodman" sprung from the Woodmen of the World and had no coordinate relations. The Society was originally organized under the laws of Georgia in 1903, its title being "Columbian Woodmen of Georgia" or "Eminent Household of Columbian Woodmen". Since 1917, it operated on a legal reserve basis.

The "Columbian Woodmen of Georgia" merged with the "Columbia Woodmen of Mississippi" early in 1921. That year, National President Lloyd Binford changed the name to "Columbian Mutual Life Assurance Society". Binford changed the name based on the fact that so many other societies were known as "Woodmen" and caused confusion in the field. The new name adopted by this growing organization gave it individuality and carried the banner of standard life insurance on the co-operative fraternal plan. This company operated under the New York Conference Law governing fraternal life insurance societies and a charter issued by the State of Mississippi.

Also in 1922, the Society decided to move its home office from Atlanta, Georgia, to Memphis, Tennessee. Many Southern cities presented claims for the home office. The delegates gave the subject careful consideration and decided that Memphis was the logical location because of its accessibility. It was found to be the only important city nearest the greatest number of members. This acceptable change was largely due to the foresight of National President Lloyd Binford, who for several years had advocated a more central location for the home office. Having decided upon a permanent location for the home office, the Society arranged to erect an office building of 15 to 20 stories. This would be a monument to the Society and an ornament to the city of Memphis. Coincident with its removal to Memphis, the Society intended to extend loans amounting to approximately US$300,000 to small borrowers for the purpose of erecting homes in that city to accelerate the industrial activity of the community.

On August 10, 1926, Columbian Mutual Life Insurance Company incorporated in Memphis, Tennessee, under the laws of Mississippi, to take over the business of Columbian Mutual Life Assurance Society. It wrote life, accident, and disability insurance. It covered the states of Alabama, Arkansas, Florida, Louisiana, Mississippi, and Tennessee.

== Administration ==
The Society operated in the States of Alabama, Arkansas, Florida, Georgia, Illinois, Kentucky, Louisiana, Mississippi, Missouri, Oklahoma, Pennsylvania, South Carolina, Tennessee, Texas, and Virginia, and in the District of Columbia.

The Society was among the first fraternal societies to place their members on a sound basis. It transferred its certificates to a legal reserve basis, giving insurance that provided all of the favorable benefits known to fraternal or old-line operation. It issued certificates carrying death, disability, accident, old-age and funeral benefits.

Suggested by Binford, the national representatives changed the titles of the officers, simplifying them and make them more intelligible to laymen.

== Notable people ==
The Columbian Mutual Life Assurance Society was founded by: Lloyd T. Binford, Hon. Thos. C. Barrett, Hon. Charles H. Brough, W. D. Davis, Hon. Ben C. Dawkins, Hon. Hugh M. Dorsey, Hon. George H. Etheridge, Gen. Clement A. Evans, Dr. E. H. Galloway, Hon. Luther E. Hall, Gen. Geo. P. Harrison, Hon. Albert Howell Jr., Hon. T. C Kimbrough, Thad B. Lampton, Hon. O. L. McKay, Dr. Price E. Murray, Hon. W. J. Northern, Hon. Percy E. Quinn, Hon. Jos. E. Ransdell, Dr. Eugene Rosamond, Hon. T. U. Sisson, Hon. Hoke Smith, Hon. Sydney Smith.

Binford, one of the founders of the Society, was its first president and continued in that role after its re-organization. He became president of the new company upon its incorporation, actively connected with the organization for more than twenty years. Prior to that time, he had extensive experience as organizer and producer in the life insurance field having seen service with both the Equitable and New York Life.

== Later mergers and acquisitions ==
In July 1965, when Lincoln American Life Insurance Company acquired Columbian Mutual Life Insurance Company, the building in Memphis was renamed. In 1978, the building was added to the National Register of Historic Places.

Conseco purchased Lincoln American Life Insurance from American General Corp. in March 1985.
