= Niagara Falls (1941 film) =

1941 film by Gordon Douglas

- Original British film poster
- Directed by: Gordon Douglas
- Written by: Eugene Conrad (writer); Paul Gerard Smith (writer); Hal Yates (writer)
- Produced by: Fred Guiol (producer); Hal Roach (executive producer)
- Starring: Marjorie Woodworth; Tom Brown; ZaSu Pitts
- Cinematography: Robert Pittack
- Edited by: Bert Jordan
- Production company: Hal Roach Studios
- Distributed by: United Artists
- Release date: October 17, 1941
- Running time: 43 minutes
- Country: United States
- Language: English
- Budget: $105,770
- Box office: $218,965

Niagara Falls is a 1941 American comedy film directed by Gordon Douglas and starring Marjorie Woodworth, Tom Brown and ZaSu Pitts. The film is a comedy of errors produced as one of Hal Roach's Streamliners.

== Plot ==
A peanut vendor witnesses a man named Sam Sawyer attempting suicide by jumping from a cliff into the water below. The vendor offers Sam a free bag of peanuts in exchange for his story.

Through flashback, Sam relates that he and his wife Emily visited Niagara Falls for their honeymoon. On the way there, Sam and Emily encounter a bickering young couple named Tom and Margie who they later see at their hotel. Tom and Margie are strangers who met through automobile accidents that have destroyed their cars, leaving them furious with each other. Unknown to each other, Tom and Margie hitch rides to the same hotel where they both plan to stay. Once at the hotel, Sam sees Tom and Margie arguing and Sam wrongly assumes that they are married. He offers his and Emily's reserved bridal suite to the couple in order that they may reconcile.

Tom and Margie are not receptive to the idea, so Sam marches them at gunpoint into the smaller room that he and Emily had taken in exchange for the bridal suite and locks them in. To the distress of Emily, Sam is so intent on bringing Tom and Margie together that he stays awake all night with his revolver facing their room to prevent any escape attempts.

During the night, Tom and Margie realize they are in love and ask a minister and a witness, who are hotel guests, to marry them. In the morning, Sam and the hotel management discover that the Tom and Margie were not married but spent the night in the same room. The outraged female hotel guests demand that both couples are evicted in shame.

After the flashback, Sam concludes the story and says, "Nothing will ever cure me". In response, the peanut vendor pushes Sam over the cliff. Sam clings to a branch stating, "I'm gonna start minding my own business before it's too late". The branch snaps, Sam says "Too late!" and falls but survives, treading water.

== Cast ==
- Marjorie Woodworth as Margie Blake
- Tom Brown as Tom Wilson
- ZaSu Pitts as Emmy Sawyer
- Slim Summerville as Sam Sawyer
- Chester Clute as Hotel Manager Potter
- Edgar Dearing as State Trooper
- Edward Gargan as Chuck
- Gladys Blake as Trixie
- Leon Belasco as Head Waiter
- Charlie Hall as Bellhop
- Rand Brooks as Honeymooner
- Margaret Roach as Honeymooner
- Jack Rice as Hotel Desk Clerk

== Notes ==
ZaSu Pitts and Slim Summerville had appeared in the streamliner prequel Miss Polly, playing the same characters. When some cinemas refused to accept double features, Hal Roach combined the two films into one standard-length feature with the same title.
