= Curley (film) =

1947 film by Bernard Carr

- Directed by: Bernard Carr
- Written by: Robert F. McGowan (story); Dorothy Reid; Mary McCarthy
- Produced by: Hal Roach; Robert F. McGowan
- Starring: Larry Olsen; Frances Rafferty; Billy Gray; Rene Beard
- Cinematography: John W. Boyle
- Edited by: Bert Jordan
- Music by: Heinz Roemheld
- Distributed by: United Artists
- Release date: August 23, 1947
- Running time: 53 minutes
- Country: United States
- Language: English

Curley is a 1947 American comedy film produced by Hal Roach and Robert F. McGowan as a re-imagining of their Our Gang series. The film was one of Roach's "streamlined" features of the 1940s, running 53 minutes and was designed as a b-movie. Like most of Roach's latter-day output, Curley was shot in Cinecolor.

Bernard Carr was the film's director, and the film released to theatres on August 23, 1947, by United Artists. It stars Larry Olsen, Frances Rafferty, Billy Gray, and Rene Beard, younger brother of original Our Gang cast member Matthew "Stymie" Beard. The plot of the film centers on a group of schoolchildren, led by Curley (Olsen), playing pranks on their teacher, Miss Johnson (Rafferty).

== Plot ==
The very much appreciated young woman who was the previous teacher in Lakeview elementary school got married, and a substitute is appointed. School rascal William "Curley" Benson gathers his classmates to make plans to get rid of their new teacher. They strongly suspect the substitute teacher to be the half-mad eccentric, middle-aged Miss Johnson.

The county supervisor, Miss Payne, visits Miss Johnson and finds out that the new teacher is actually Miss Johnson's niece Mildred, a pretty young woman who was a physical training instructor in the WAVES during the war. Miss Payne has her doubts about Mildred's capability to control a class like the one at Lakeview and warns Mildred. Miss Payne believes that Mildred might be too young and inexperienced to handle the spirited children.

On the morning of the first day of school Mildred encounters the unsuspecting Curley on the way to school and offers him a ride. Not knowing that he is talking to his teacher, he tells her about the pranks that he and his friends are going to play on "Pigglepuss", their new teacher. Curley even tells her about putting his pet frog, Croakey, on the teacher's chair.

Curley also manages to disclose the school kids' hope that Miss Johnson will quit immediately, so that they can spend the whole day fishing. At school, Curley loads his "rocketship" car powered by skyrockets. He positions the car so as to aim at an exhaust tube through a classroom window and also fills it with extra rockets and smoke bombs. When Curley takes his seat in the classroom, he discovers that his new teacher is the wonderful, kindhearted Mildred. During that first day, she teaches the children a lesson of humility by making each one a victim of their own prank, and Curley, who is also humiliated, flees the scene before his prank is about to happen.

The schoolroom is duly filled with thick black smoke, Curley is blamed, but it turns out he is chasing the rocketship toy car, and not driving it. The car has been hijacked by "Dis" and "Dat", who are two mischievous children. They drive the car carelessly and wildly across the fields and, ultimately, into a haystack, taking the stack with them, continuing the frightful journey. Miss Payne appears on the scene, and frightened by the moving haystack, she crashes her car while trying to avoid it. Miss Payne angrily cries out her disappointment with Mildred for her inability to discipline the children. Meanwhile, Mildred has brought the children on a picnic with her aunt. She teaches them baseball, football, and boxing and offers the children lessons after school, but only if they earn good grades in their classes. Mildred is engaged in a boxing fight with the big Hank, a tough student, when the enraged Miss Payne arrives in order to scrutinize her performance.

Curley comes back from his hiding to help, but he mistakenly thinks Hank is beating up his teacher. He attacks the surprised Hank and manages to send Hank flying into a lake. Curley is forced to leave the picnic in shame. The others are grateful for their substitute teacher and thank Miss Payne for Mildred. Mildred gets an explanation of the previous events, and that when the classroom filled with smoke, Curley was chasing his "rocketship", not driving it, thus not responsible for the prank. Mildred finally finds Curley hiding and crying, afraid he will be expelled. He is also afraid that Mildred will be fired. Mildred reassures him with cake and ice cream that such a thing won't happen, and tops it off with picking up Croakey the frog.

== Cast ==
- Larry Olsen as William Benson aka Curley
- Frances Rafferty as Mildred Johnson
- Eilene Janssen as Betty
- Dale Belding as Speck
- Peter Miles as Dudley ("Dud")
- Ardda Lynwood as Ardda Benson
- Kathleen Howard as Aunt Martha
- Edna Holland as Miss Payne
- Rene Beard as Dis
- Donald King as Dat
- Barbara Woodell as Mrs. Benson (scenes deleted)
- Billy Andrews as Biff (uncredited)
- Guy Beach as Station Master (uncredited)
- Robert Bentley as Lt. Col. Robert Martin (uncredited)
- Helen Brown as Elizabeth Evans Martin (uncredited)
- Eddie Dunn as Charlie, 2nd Baggage Man (uncredited)
- James Farley as First Baggage Man (uncredited)
- Billy Gray as Sandy (uncredited)
- Gene Holland as Hank Peters (uncredited)
- Kermit Maynard as Farmer (uncredited)
- George McDonald as Bozo (uncredited)
- James Menzies as Jimmie (uncredited)
- Thomas Menzies as Tommie (uncredited)
- Georgie Nokes as Chuck (uncredited)
- Syd Saylor as Taxi Driver (uncredited)
- Ferris Taylor as Justice of the Peace (uncredited)
- Fred Trowbridge as Train Conductor (uncredited)

== Production ==
When Hal Roach sold Our Gang to Metro-Goldwyn-Mayer in 1938, he was contractually bound not to produce any more children's comedies. When Roach decided that he wanted to produce Curley, he got MGM's permission by giving up his right to buy back the name Our Gang. Curley and its sequel, Who Killed Doc Robbin, performed mildly at the box office.

== Censorship ==
Our Gang was known for its integrated cast of black and white children, and Curley followed suit. The Memphis, Tennessee Censor Board banned Curley for showing black and white children in school together and playing together. Lloyd Binford, head of the censor board, gave this rationale to Roach's distributor, United Artists: "[The board] was unable to approve your 'Curley' picture with the little Negroes as the South does not permit Negroes in white schools nor recognize social equality between the races, even in children". The film's distributor filed a lawsuit against the board, arguing that film censorship was unconstitutional. On appeal, the Tennessee Supreme Court held that the suit could not be maintained because the film distributor, which was conducting business within the state, as a foreign corporation failed to register in Tennessee.
