= A WAVE, a WAC and a Marine =

1944 film by Phil Karlson

- Directed by: Phil Karlson
- Screenplay by: Hal Fimberg
- Produced by: Edward Sherman; Sebastian Cristillo (executive producer)
- Starring: Elyse Knox; Anne Gillis; Sally Eilers; Richard Lane; Marjorie Woodworth; Ramsay Ames; Henny Youngman
- Cinematography: Maury Gertsman
- Edited by: William Austin
- Music by: Freddie Rich
- Distributed by: Monogram Pictures
- Release date: October 7, 1944
- Running time: 70 minutes
- Country: United States
- Language: English

A WAVE, a WAC and a Marine is an American 1944 musical comedy film directed by Phil Karlson (in his directorial debut) for low-budget Monogram Pictures.

== Plot ==
Sally Eilers runs a talent agency and sets out to put a couple of Broadway stars under contract. Her bumbling employee signs their understudies instead.

== Cast ==
- Elyse Knox as Marian
- Ann Gillis as Judy (as Anne Gillis)
- Sally Eilers as Margaret Ames
- Richard Lane as Marty Allen
- Marjorie Woodworth as Eileen
- Ramsay Ames as Betty
- Henny Youngman as O. Henry Brown
- Charles 'Red' Marshall as Red (as 'Red' Marshall)
- Alan Dinehart as R. J., the Producer
- Billy Mack as himself
- Cy Kendall as Mike
- Aileen Pringle as Newswoman
- Jack Mulhall as Bartender
- Mabel Todd as Nurse
- Milt Bronson as himself
- unbilled players include Mel Blanc, Elvia Allman, and Connie Haines

== Production ==
The film's executive producer was comedian Lou Costello. As a gesture to his father – a diehard movie fan, who used the family's actual last name – Costello was credited as Sebastian Cristillo (his father's name), so the latter could see his own name onscreen. The other listed producer, Edward Sherman, was Costello's manager.

Phil Karlson got to know Lou Costello when worked on Abbott and Costello films at Universal as an assistant. Costello tracked down Karlson and told him he wanted to produce a film with Karlson directing. According to Karlson, Costello asked him what did he want to make, and "I said I don't know. By this time I'm so flabbergasted that I had no idea what I wanted to do. But he put up the money and we decided on the crazy story A Wave, a WAC and a Marine."

== Reception ==
Karlson called the film "probably the worst picture ever made.... It was a nothing picture, but I was lucky because it was for Monogram and they didn't understand how bad it was because they had never made anything that was any good." However it did launch Karlson's directing career.

== See also ==
- List of American films of 1944
