= Island of Lost Men =

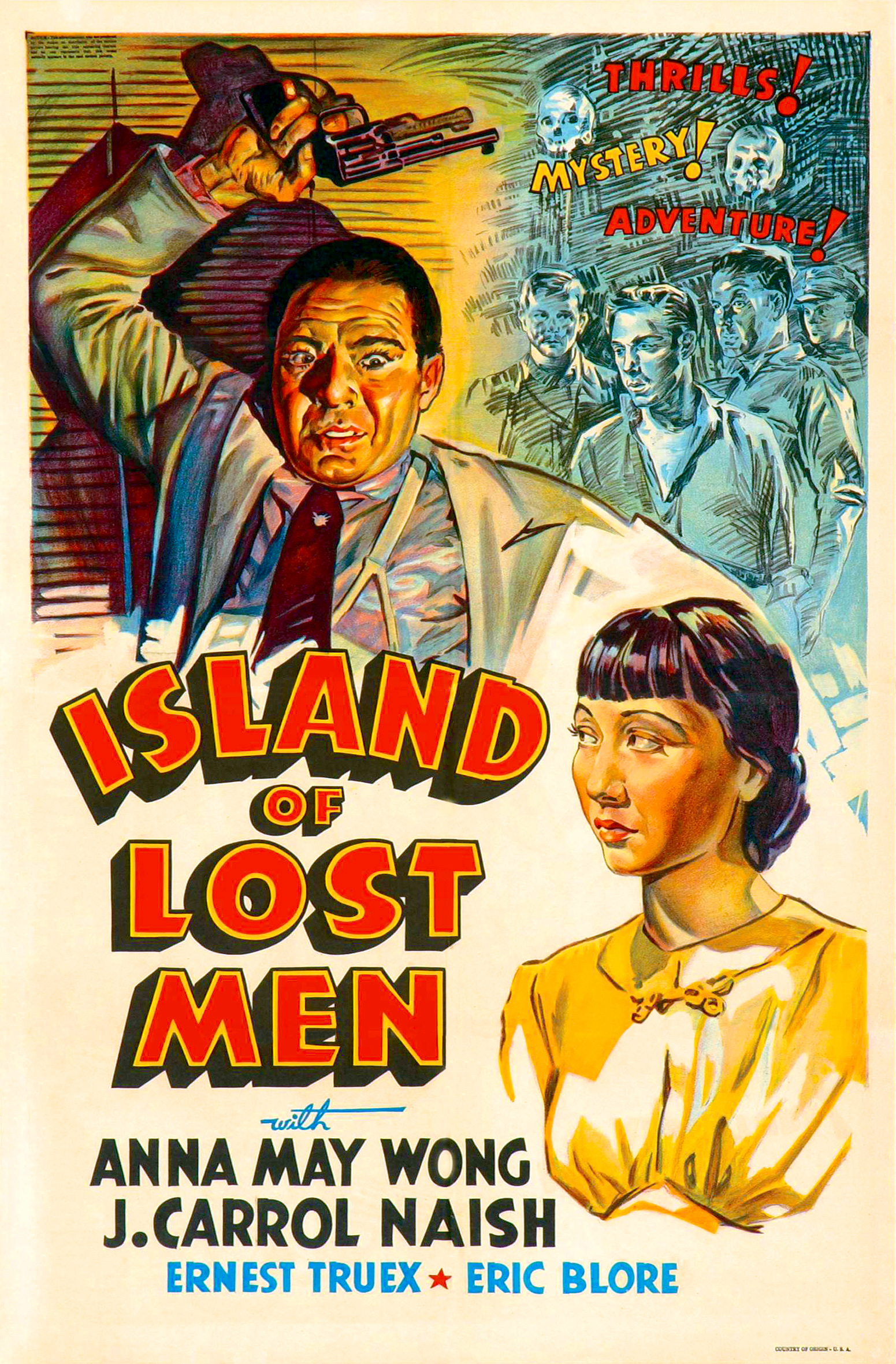
- Theatrical release poster
- Directed by: Kurt Neumann
- Screenplay by: William R. Lipman; Horace McCoy
- Based on: Norman Reilly Raine; Frank Butler (based on a play by)
- Starring: Anna May Wong; J. Carrol Naish
- Cinematography: Karl Strauss
- Edited by: Ellsworth Hoagland
- Color process: Black and white
- Production company: Paramount Pictures
- Distributed by: Paramount Pictures
- Release date: August 16, 1939
- Running time: 63 minutes
- Country: United States
- Language: English
- Budget: $165,000

Island of Lost Men is a 1939 American crime film directed by Kurt Neumann and starring Anna May Wong and J. Carrol Naish. It tells the story of the daughter of a general who goes to look for her father after he disappears. The film received mixed reviews and was the last that Wong made for Paramount Pictures.

== Plot ==
Kim Ling, the daughter of a general accused of embezzling $300,000 of Chinese government money, investigates his disappearance. She follows clues to a plantation run by Gregory Prin north of Singapore. There she meets Chang Tai, who is an undercover Chinese secret service agent investigating Prin's activities. Together they manage to find Ling's father and the money. Prin's partner, Tex Ballister arrives, demanding his half of the $300,000. He reveals Tai's and Ling's true identities to Prin. After the death of several of Prin's henchmen a native tribe rebellion ignites, allowing Ling, her father, and Tai to escape, while Prin and Ballister are killed.

== Cast ==
- Anna May Wong as Kim Ling/China Lily
- J. Carrol Naish as Gregory Prin
- Anthony Quinn as Chang Tai
- Eric Blore as Herbert
- Broderick Crawford as Tex Ballister
- Ernest Truex as Frobenius
- Rudolf Forster as Professor Sen
- William Haade as Hambly

== Production ==
Island of Lost Men was filmed in early 1939. Production was delayed by cost overruns of approximately $25,000. Among the most expensive scenes were those involving the jungle and the river scene. Wong's salary was $6,000 with another $1,000 paid for overtime, while Quinn only earned $750.

The film is a loose remake of the 1933 Paramount film White Woman.

The original title for the film was Guns for China. However, the U.S. State Department implored studios to avoid referencing or alluding to the then-ongoing Second Sino-Japanese War. After discussion with its sales manager in Japan, Paramount Pictures changed the title to Island of Lost Men.

Wong sang "Music on the Shore", composed by Friedrich Hollaender and Frank Loesser. The song was written especially for her.

== Release ==
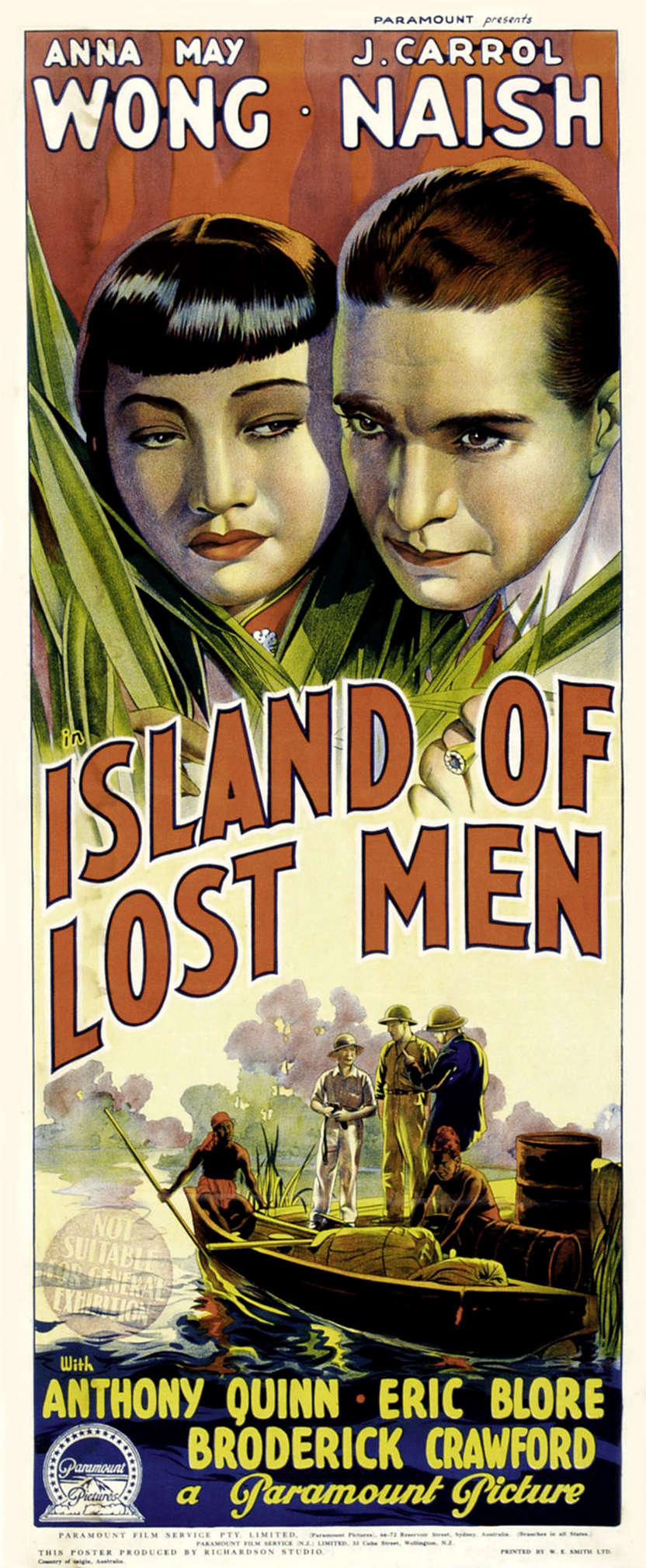
Australian poster for the release of Island of Lost Men

Island of Lost Men received its American release on August 16, 1939. Critical reception was mixed. Variety praised the general production, acting (especially Wong's), and sets; however, it considered the plot to be "trite". The Daily Variety noted that Wong's singing was "pleasing". The British trade paper Kinematograph Weekly was dismissive of the film, but appreciative of Wong's acting. Frank S. Nugent of The New York Times wrote that the "kindliest" thing one could say about the movie is that Naish is in it, "only this time with a slant to Mr. Naish's villainous eyes", and that the jungle setting was so unbelievable that it implied that "if the camera were swung no more than a frame or so to either side it would reveal a filling station, or a roadside food dispensary in the shape of a hot dog".

Island of Lost Men proved to be Wong's last film with Paramount. The studio did not renew her contract afterwards, possibly because of the budget overruns in Island.
