= Featurette =

Film longer than a short subject but shorter than a feature film

In the American film industry, a featurette is a type of film that is shorter than a full-length feature, but longer than a short film. The term may refer to either of two types of content: a shorter film or a companion film.

== Medium-length films ==
A featurette is a film usually of three to four reels in length, or about 24–40 minutes in running time, thus longer than a two-reel short subject but shorter than a feature film. Hence, it is a "small feature" (the ending "-ette" is a common diminutive suffix derived from French), and in fact featurettes were sometimes called "streamlined features". Featurette was commonly used from before the start of the sound era into the 1960s, when films of such length as the Hal Roach's Streamliners—and several French films of that length—ceased being made, or were made as experimental or art films and subsumed under the more general rubric of short film. Some featurettes are still being produced, notably the action comedy Kung Fury, which runs only 31 minutes.

Other terms with a similar meaning include: medium-length films, long shorts and short features.

== Companion films ==
After the advent of DVD technology, the term also gained the meaning of "a brief documentary film covering one or more aspects of the film creation process". In DVD features descriptions, the term "featurette" usually refers to behind-the-scenes–type bonus material such as documentaries on special effects, set design, or cast and crew interviews.
