= Race Street =

1948 film by Edwin L. Marin

- Theatrical release poster
- Directed by: Edwin L. Marin
- Screenplay by: Martin Rackin
- Based on: Race Street; 1945 story in Turf and Sport Digest by Maurice Davis
- Produced by: Nat Holt; Jack J. Gross (executive producer)
- Starring: George Raft; William Bendix; Marilyn Maxwell
- Cinematography: J. Roy Hunt
- Edited by: Samuel E. Beetley
- Music by: Roy Webb
- Distributed by: RKO Pictures
- Release date: June 22, 1948 (United States)
- Running time: 79 minutes
- Country: United States
- Language: English

Race Street is a 1948 American crime film noir directed by Edwin L. Marin. The drama features George Raft, William Bendix and Marilyn Maxwell. It was one of several collaborations between Raft and Marin.

== Plot ==
When his bookie pal Hal is killed, nightclub owner Dan Gannin intends to do something about it. His police pal Lt. Runson warns him not to take the law into his own hands.

Also concerned is Dan's girlfriend, Robbie, a war widow. But when two thugs working for a mob boss blindfold and beat Dan, a disloyal Robbie is also in the room.

It turns out Robbie is not a widow at all but the showgirl ex-wife of the crime kingpin, Phil Dixon, and still working for him. She denies it at first, but Dan recalls recognizing the scent of her perfume while blindfolded.

Lt. Runson tries to provide Dan protective custody, but another bookie betrays Dan to the mob. The lieutenant is about to be shot when Dan intercepts the bullet. He dies as Dixon is placed under arrest.

== Cast ==
- George Raft as Daniel J. 'Dan' Gannin
- William Bendix as Lt. Barney Runson
- Marilyn Maxwell as Robbie Lawrence
- Frank Faylen as Phil Dixon
- Harry Morgan as Hal Towers (credited as Henry Morgan)
- Gale Robbins as Elaine Gannin
- Cully Richards as Mike Hadley
- Mack Gray as Stringy
- Russell Hicks as Easy Mason

== Production ==
The script was based on a magazine serial by Maurice Davis which appeared in Turf and Sport Digest from December 1945 to March 1946. Film rights were bought by RKO. Raft signed in January 1947. According to The New York Times, Raft was to play a newspaper handicapper and William Bendix would play a bookmaker who tries to corrupt the handicapper because he is costing the bookmaker money.

The story changed and the female lead went to Marilyn Maxwell. Gale Robbins, who played Raft's sister, was a singer under contract to RKO.

There was some location filming in San Francisco.

At one time the film was going to be called Jackpot.

The film was made by RKO when it was run by Dore Schary but before it was released the studio was bought by Howard Hughes and Schary left the company.

== Reception ==
When the film was released, The New York Times film critic, Thomas M. Pryor, panned the film, writing, "everything about this dreary exercise in violence is strictly formula, depressingly juvenile and dull...Mr. Raft, an old hand at this sort of thing, handles himself with ease and authority, and William Bendix does a good job as the detective. There is even professional dexterity to the direction, but all this energy is completely wasted on a shoddy, routine story."

The Los Angeles Times said the film "didn't have much to say."

=== Box office ===
The film made a minor profit. It was the third of four films Raft made for RKO.
