= All-American Co-ed =

1941 film by LeRoy Prinz

- Original Movie Poster
- Directed by: Leroy Prinz
- Written by: Adapted by Kenneth Higgins
- Screenplay by: Cortland Fitzsimmons
- Story by: Leroy Prinz; Hal Roach Jr.
- Produced by: Leroy Prinz
- Starring: Frances Langford; Johnny Downs; Marjorie Woodworth; Noah Beery Jr. Esther Dale; Harry Langdon and The Tanner Sisters
- Cinematography: Robert Pittack, A.S.C.
- Edited by: Bert Jordan
- Music by: Edward Ward
- Production company: Hal Roach Studios, Inc.
- Distributed by: United Artists
- Release date: October 31, 1941
- Running time: 49 minutes
- Country: United States
- Language: English
- Budget: $108,932
- Box office: $190,107

All-American Co-ed is a 1941 American musical film produced and directed by Leroy Prinz as a Hal Roach Streamliner for release by United Artists. It stars Frances Langford, Johnny Downs, Marjorie Woodworth, Noah Beery Jr., Esther Dale, Harry Langdon, and The Tanner Sisters.

== Plot ==
Quinceton College Zeta fraternity stages a revue with members in drag. The resulting publicity catches the attention of newspaperman Hap Holden (Harry Langdon) and Virginia Collinge (Frances Langford). They convince Virginia's aunt Matilda Collinge (Esther Dale), president of failing Mar Brynn (a woman's horticultural college), to refute the school's staid image by sponsoring a contest awarding a dozen free scholarships aimed at "unusual girls", winners of pageants for fruits, vegetables and flowers, as women most likely to succeed and to be showcased in a musical presentation during the Fall Festival.

To publicize the contest, President Collinge pokes fun at Zeta members as being least likely to succeed and bans them from their campus. For revenge the Zeta chapter president Bob Sheppard (Johnny Downs) is coerced to infiltrate Mar Brynn by entering the contest as "Bobbie DeWolfe, Queen of the Flowers". After falling in love with Virginia, Bob comes clean and assists in staging the show, but includes in the finale a Busby Berkeley-style spelling out of "Zeta" as revenge for the ban.

== Cast ==
- Frances Langford as Virginia
- Johnny Downs as Bob Sheppard
- Marjorie Woodworth as Bunny
- Noah Beery Jr. as Slinky
- Esther Dale as Matilda
- Harry Langdon as Hap Holden
- Alan Hale Jr. as Tiny
- Kent Rogers as Henry
- Allan Lane as 2nd Senior
- Joe Brown Jr. as 3rd Senior
- Irving Mitchell as Doctor
- Lillian Randolph as Washwoman (Deborah)
- Carlyle Blackwell Jr. as 4th Senior
- Mickey Tanner • Betty Tanner • Martha Tanner as Vocal Trio

=== Uncredited ===
- Frank O'Connor, as Policeman
- Jesse Graves, as Redcap
- Dudley Dickerson, as Dancing Train Porter
- Elyse Knox, as Co-ed
- Marie Windsor, as Carrot Queen

== Soundtrack ==
- Johnny Downs with chorus - "I'm a Chap with a Chip on My Shoulder" (by Walter G. Samuels and Charles Newman)
- Frances Langford - "I'm a Chap with a Chip on My Shoulder"
- Marjorie Woodworth, Tanner Sisters with Harry Langdon and chorus - "Up at the Crack of Dawn" (by Walter G. Samuels and Charles Newman)
- Frances Langford with chorus - "Out of the Silence" (by Lloyd B. Norlin)
- Frances Langford, Tanner Sisters and Johnny Downs - "The Farmer's Daughter" (by Walter G. Samuels and Charles Newman)

"Out of the Silence", music and lyrics by Lloyd B. Norlin, was nominated for the Academy Award for Best Original Song of 1941. It lost to Jerome Kern and Oscar Hammerstein's "The Last Time I Saw Paris", from Lady Be Good (1941).
