= The McGuerins from Brooklyn =

1942 film by Kurt Neumann

- Theatrical release poster
- Directed by: Kurt Neumann
- Screenplay by: Earle Snell; Clarence Marks
- Produced by: Fred Guiol; Hal Roach
- Starring: William Bendix; Grace Bradley; Arline Judge; Max Baer; Marjorie Woodworth; Joe Sawyer; Marion Martin; Rex Evans
- Cinematography: Robert Pittack
- Edited by: Richard C. Currier; Bert Jordan
- Production company: Hal Roach Studios
- Distributed by: United Artists
- Release date: December 31, 1942
- Running time: 45 minutes
- Country: United States
- Language: English

The McGuerins from Brooklyn is a 1942 American comedy film directed by Kurt Neumann and written by Earle Snell and Clarence Marks. The film stars William Bendix, Grace Bradley, Arline Judge, Max Baer, Marjorie Woodworth, Joe Sawyer, Marion Martin and Rex Evans. The film was released on December 31, 1942, by United Artists.

This was the second of the so-called Taxi Comedies series, which featured Bendix, Sawyer, and Bradley playing the same characters. The first film was Brooklyn Orchid and the last film was Taxi, Mister.

== Cast ==
- William Bendix as Timothy 'Tim' McGuerin
- Grace Bradley as Sadie McGuerin
- Arline Judge as Marcia Marsden
- Max Baer (Boxer) as Professor Samson
- Marjorie Woodworth as Lucy Gibbs
- Joe Sawyer as Eddie Corbett
- Marion Martin as Myrtle, Marcia's friend
- Rex Evans as Sterling, McGuerin's Butler
- J. Farrell MacDonald as Cop
- Pat Flaherty as Pat, gym attendant
- Alan Hale, Jr. as Alan, gym attendant
