= Lloyd Binford =

American film censor

Chief of Memphis Board of Censors
- In office January 7, 1928 – January 1, 1956

Personal details
- Born: Lloyd Tilghman Binford; December 16, 1866 Duck Hill, Mississippi, U.S.
- Died: August 27, 1956 (aged 89) Memphis, Tennessee, U.S.

Lloyd Tilghman Binford (December 16, 1866 – August 27, 1956) was an American insurance executive and film censor who was the head of the Memphis Censor Board in the early 20th Century for 28 years.

== Early life ==
Binford was born in Duck Hill, Mississippi on December 16, 1866. Even though his formal education ended in the fifth grade, Binford started and ran different businesses. He sold fireworks for Fourth of July one summer and he also ran an outdoor roller-skating rink at 14.

At 16, he started working as a railway clerk for the Illinois Central Railroad. His time at the Illinois Central Railroad was filled with many dangerous situations, which led him to seek out a safer job at the Woodmen of the World, a fraternal organization that offered insurance to its members.

Binford was so successful at this job that he was organizing Woodmen units throughout Mississippi, which caught the attention of Columbian Mutual Life Assurance Society. He moved up in the company and became president in 1916. He chose to build the headquarters in Memphis, Tennessee, leading him to move there.

== Career ==
The mayor of Memphis and Binford's political boss, E.H. Crump, appointed Binford as the leader of the newly developed Board of Censors in Memphis in 1928. In this role, he chose to censor films that included topics or actors he did not support.

One of Binford's first ordered cuts was to remove the whipping and crucifixion sequences from Cecil B. de Mille's The King of Kings. The Lyric Theatre manager, with support of the film distributor, showed the film uncut, leading to his arrest. This led to a hearing with the Tennessee Court of Appeals, which held that the acts of the Memphis Censor Board were not subject to judicial review provided the board did not exceed its authority, so the board's cuts to the film were legal, final, and not reviewable under state law. Later cuts to or bans were ordered by the censor board to numerous films with African-American stars or topics, including Imitation of Life, Sensations of 1945, and Brewster's Millions (1945).

In 1945, he attracted national attention when he banned the Jean Renoir film The Southerner, citing his opinion that the Southern characters were portrayed as "common, lowdown, ignorant white trash". The film's producer David Loew retorted that "Binford must have been sniffing too many magnolias." Boxoffice magazine noted in an editorial that Binford's opinion of The Southerner contrasted with that of the United Daughters of the Confederacy, which endorsed the film as portraying "'the courage, stout-heartedness and love of our land which is an outstanding characteristic of the south.'"

Binford also objected to any film that featured a train robbery, and blocked release in Memphis of Jesse James, The Return of Frank James, The Outlaw, and others. In 1954, Binford told Variety why he had banned the film Woman They Almost Lynched, saying: "I am against pictures featuring Jesse James and his brothers and always ban such pictures."

Among the other films Binford had banned from Memphis was the comedy Curley (1947), which was executive-produced by Hal Roach in the style of his earlier Our Gang shorts. Binford stated in a letter to the distributor, "'[The board] was unable to approve your Curley picture with the little Negroes as the south does not permit Negroes in white schools nor recognize social equality between the races, even in children.'" The film distributor filed a lawsuit against the board, arguing that film censorship was unconstitutional. On appeal, the Tennessee Supreme Court held that the suit could not be maintained because the film distributor, which was conducting business within the state, as a foreign corporation failed to register in Tennessee.

Binford also occasionally banned films because of the personal conduct of the stars rather than the content of the movies. In 1950, referring to Ingrid Bergman's affair with director Roberto Rossellini, he announced that Bergman's films were banned from Memphis "'because of her conduct, not because of the pictures'.... 'We haven't even seen Stromboli and we don't expect to see it,'" Binford said. The following year, a re-release of Charlie Chaplin's 1931 film City Lights was banned from Memphis. Binford's explanation of the ban stated that although "'[t]here's nothing wrong with the picture itself'", the film could not be shown in the city "'because of Chaplin's character and reputation'" and he also called him a "London guttersnipe"; Binford was referring to Chaplin's 4th marriage to the 18-year old Oona O'Neil in 1943.

== Later life ==
Binford became increasingly ill during the 1950s and retired from his post as chairman of the Censor Board on January 1, 1956. He died of conditions stemming from an attack of influenza on August 27, 1956.

== Impact ==
While Binford’s bans may have kept certain films from being shown in Memphis, some publicists used his negative reviews as promotional material for their film. For example, his review of Son of Sinbad drove people to travel to different cities to see the film because he stated it included “one of the vilest dances I ever saw” and noted “The dancer was almost naked, wearing only a G-string and a filmy sort of apron".

The Memphis Censor Board itself continued operations until July 1965, when U.S. Circuit Judge Bailey Brown, in a case involving proposed cuts to the Italian mondo film Women of the World (1963), declared the city ordinances under which the board operated to be unconstitutional.

== See also ==
- Film censorship in the United States
