= Joe Sawyer =

Canadian actor (1906–1982)

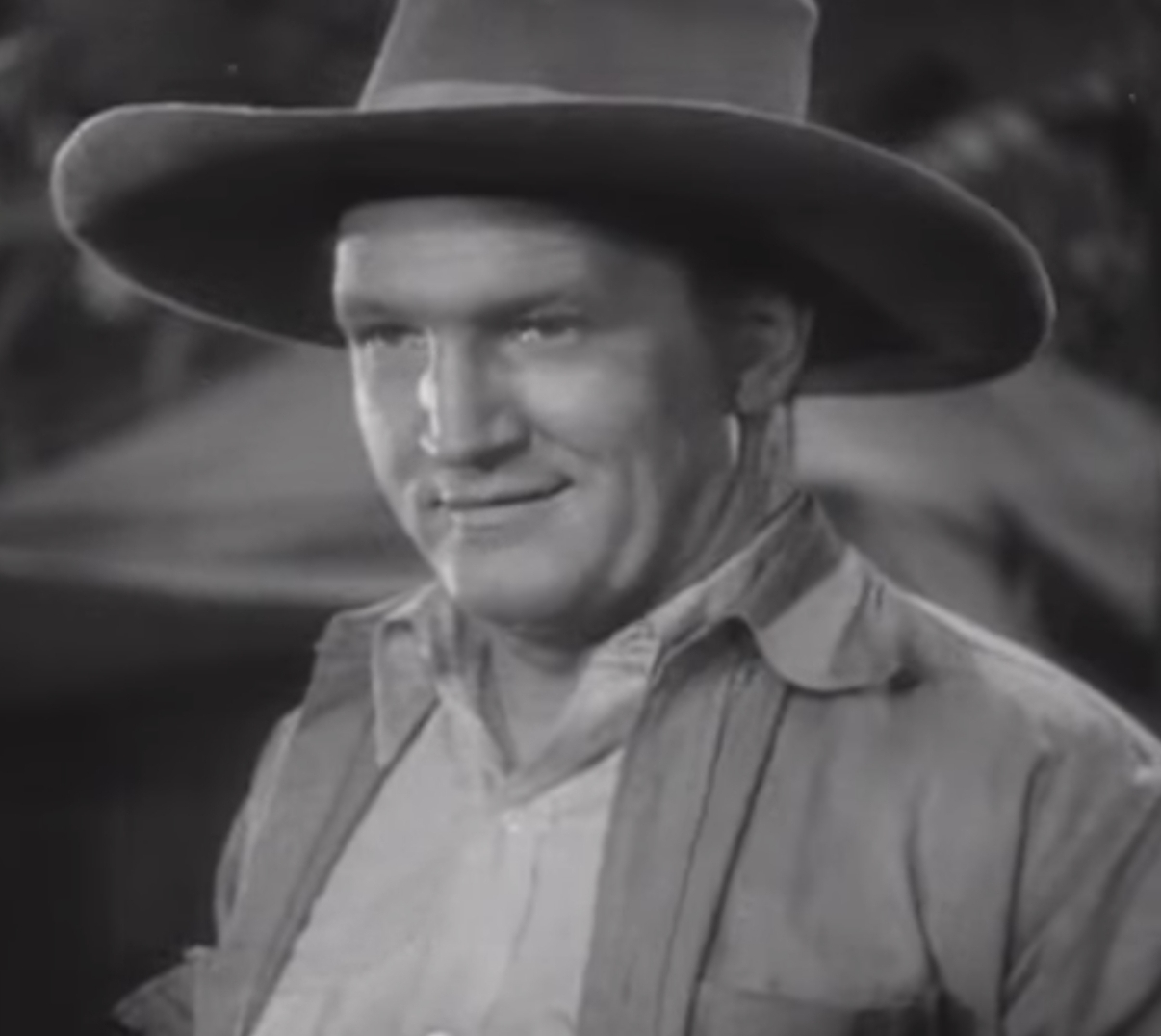
- Sawyer in Tarzan's Revenge (1938)
- Born: Joseph Sauer; August 29, 1906; Guelph, Ontario, Canada
- Died: April 21, 1982 (aged 75); Ashland, Oregon, U.S.A.
- Other name: Joseph Sawyer
- Occupation: Actor
- Years active: 1930–1962

Joe Sawyer (born Joseph Sauer; August 29, 1906 – April 21, 1982) was a Canadian film actor. He appeared in more than 200 films between 1927 and 1962, and was sometimes billed under his birth name.

== Early life ==
Sawyer was born August 29, 1906, as Joseph Sauer in Guelph, Ontario, Canada. His parents were German. In his 20s he went to Los Angeles to pursue a career in films.

== Career ==
Sawyer gained acting experience in the Pasadena Playhouse. Productions in which he performed there included Quinneys, The Wolves, and White Wings.

Popular roles that he portrayed included Sergeant Biff O'Hara in The Adventures of Rin-Tin-Tin, a film, and on radio. On Stories of the Century in 1954, he portrayed Butch Cassidy, a role which he repeated in the 1958 episode "The Outlaw Legion" of the syndicated western series Frontier Doctor. Sawyer also appeared on ABC's, Maverick, Sugarfoot, Peter Gunn, and Surfside 6 as well as NBC's Bat Masterson.

== Death ==
Sawyer died April 21, 1982, in Ashland, Oregon, from liver cancer. He was 75. His interment was in Oregon.

== Selected filmography ==
- The Public Enemy (1931) as Pool player (uncredited)
- New Adventures of Get Rich Quick Wallingford (1931) as Willis the Newspaper Reporter (uncredited)
- Surrender (1931) as Sergeant Muller
- Maker of Men (1931) as Bennett the Monroe Coach (uncredited)
- Arsène Lupin (1932) as Leroux (uncredited)
- Shopworn (1932) as Construction Camp Worker (uncredited)
- Young Bride (1932) as Library Patron Seeking Aphrodite (uncredited)
- Huddle (1932) as Slater
- Forgotten Commandments (1932) as Ivan Ivanovitch Petroff (uncredited)
- Olsen's Big Moment (1933) as 'Dapper' Danny Reynolds
- Hold Your Man (1933) as Policeman at Reformatory (uncredited)
- College Humor (1933) as Tex Roust
- The Stranger's Return (1933) as Farmhand (uncredited)
- Three-Cornered Moon (1933) as Swimming Pool Instructor (uncredited)
- Golden Harvest (1933) as Farmhand (uncredited)
- Saturday's Millions (1933) as Coach
- Ace of Aces (1933) as Capt. Daly
- College Coach (1933) as Holcomb
- Eskimo (1933) as Sergeant Hunt (uncredited)
- Blood Money (1933) as Red (uncredited)
- Jimmy and Sally (1933) as Slug Morgan (uncredited)
- Son of a Sailor (1933) as Slug (uncredited)
- Jimmy the Gent (1934) as Mike (uncredited)
- Wharf Angel (1934) as Sailor on 'The Coyote' (uncredited)
- Looking for Trouble (1934) as Henchman Max Stanley
- Sing and Like It (1934) as Gunner – Hood
- Stamboul Quest (1934) as Soldier Escorting Doktor (uncredited)
- The Notorious Sophie Lang (1934) as Building Guard (uncredited)
- Death on the Diamond (1934) as Spencer
- The Case of the Howling Dog (1934) as Carl Trask (uncredited)
- Against the Law (1934) as McManus (uncredited)
- Gridiron Flash (1934) as Coach Eversmith
- The Prescott Kid (1934) as Marshal Willoughby
- College Rhythm (1934) as Spud Miller (uncredited)
- Behold My Wife! (1934) as Morton (uncredited)
- The Westerner (1934) as Bob Lockhart
- The Band Plays On (1934) as Mr. Thomas
- Sequoia (1934) as Forest Ranger (uncredited)
- The Whole Town's Talking (1935) as Nick, Mannion's Henchman (uncredited)
- Car 99 (1935) as Whitey
- Eight Bells (1935) as Gates (uncredited)
- Air Hawks (1935) as Henchman (uncredited)
- The Informer (1935) as Barty Mulholland
- The Arizonian (1935) as Henchman Keeler
- Broadway Gondolier (1935) as 'Red'
- Man on the Flying Trapeze (1935) as Ambulance Driver (uncredited)
- Little Big Shot (1935) as Doré's Henchman #1
- Special Agent (1935) as Ned Rich
- Moonlight on the Prairie (1935) as Luke Thomas
- I Found Stella Parish (1935) as Chuck
- Frisco Kid (1935) as Slugs Crippen
- Man of Iron (1935) as Crawford
- Freshman Love (1936) as Coach Kendall
- The Petrified Forest (1936) as Jackie
- The Leathernecks Have Landed (1936) as Sgt. Regan
- The Walking Dead (1936) as Trigger Smith
- The Country Doctor (1936) as Joe, Logger lifting log (uncredited)
- Pride of the Marines (1936) as Tennessee
- Big Brown Eyes (1936) as Jack Sully
- Special Investigator (1936) as Jim 'Jimmy' Plummer
- And Sudden Death (1936) as Police Sgt. Sanborn
- High Tension (1936) as Terry Madden
- A Son Comes Home (1936) as First Truck Driver (uncredited)
- Crash Donovan (1936) as Henchman (uncredited)
- Murder with Pictures (1936) as Inspector Bacon
- Two in a Crowd (1936) as Bonelli's Henchman
- Rose Bowl (1936) as Announcer (uncredited)
- The Accusing Finger (1936) as Father Reed – the Priest
- Great Guy (1936) as Burton
- Black Legion (1937) as Cliff Moore
- Navy Blues (1937) as Chips
- Motor Madness (1937) as Steve Dolan
- They Gave Him a Gun (1937) as Doyle – Gangster (uncredited)
- San Quentin (1937) as 'Sailor Boy' Hansen
- Slim (1937) as Wilcox
- Midnight Madonna (1937) as Wolfe
- A Dangerous Adventure (1937) as Dutch
- Reported Missing (1937) as 'Brad' Martin
- The Lady Fights Back (1937) as Swede Jannsen
- Tarzan's Revenge (1938) as Olaf Punch
- Stolen Heaven (1938) as Bako
- Passport Husband (1938) as Duke Selton
- Always in Trouble (1938) as Buster Mussendorfer
- The Storm (1938) as Kelly – Wireless Operator
- Heart of the North (1938) as Red Crocker
- Gambling Ship (1938) as Tony Garzoni
- My Son Is a Criminal (1939) as Policeman (uncredited)
- You Can't Get Away with Murder (1939) as Red
- The Lady and the Mob (1939) as Blinky Mack
- Confessions of a Nazi Spy (1939) as Werner Renz
- Union Pacific (1939) as Shamus (uncredited)
- Inside Information (1939) as Detective Grazzi
- Frontier Marshal (1939) as Curley Bill
- I Stole a Million (1939) as Billings
- Rio (1939) as Prison Guard (uncredited)
- Sabotage (1939) as Gardner
- The Roaring Twenties (1939) as Sergeant Pete Jones
- Man from Montreal (1939) as Biff Anders
- The Grapes of Wrath (1940) as Keene Ranch foreman
- Honeymoon Deferred (1940) as Detective James
- The House Across the Bay (1940) as Charley
- Women Without Names (1940) as Principal Keeper Grimley (uncredited)
- Dark Command (1940) as Bushropp
- King of the Lumberjacks (1940) as Jigger, a Lumberjack
- Lucky Cisco Kid (1940) as Bill Stevens
- Wildcat Bus (1940) as Burke
- The Long Voyage Home (1940) as Davis
- Melody Ranch (1940) as Jasper Wildhack
- The Border Legion (1940) as Jim Gulden
- Santa Fe Trail (1940) as Kitzmiller
- The Lady from Cheyenne (1941) as Sheriff 'Noisy' Burkett, Henchman (uncredited)
- Sergeant York (1941) as Sergeant Early
- Down in San Diego (1941) as Dutch
- Belle Starr (1941) as John Cole
- Tanks a Million (1941) as Sgt. William Ames
- Last of the Duanes (1941) as Bull Lossomer
- Down Mexico Way (1941) as Allen
- Swamp Water (1941) as Hardy Ragan
- They Died with Their Boots On (1941) as Sergeant Doolittle
- You're in the Army Now (1941) as Sergeant Madden
- Hay Foot (1942) as Sergeant Ames
- Brooklyn Orchid (1942) as Eddie Corbett
- Sundown Jim (1942) as Ben Moffitt
- Wrecking Crew (1942) as Fred Bunce
- Fall In (1942) as Sgt. William Ames
- The McGuerins from Brooklyn (1942) as Eddie Corbett
- The Outlaw (1943) as Charley Woodruff
- Prairie Chickens (1943) as Albertson
- Taxi, Mister (1943) as Eddie Corbett
- Buckskin Frontier (1943) as Brannigan
- Cowboy in Manhattan (1943) as Louie
- Hit the Ice (1943) as Buster
- Alaska Highway (1943) as Roughhouse
- Yanks Ahoy (1943) as Sgt. Ames
- Let's Face It (1943) as Sergeant Wiggins
- Sleepy Lagoon (1943) as Lumpy
- Tarzan's Desert Mystery (1943) as Karl Straeder
- Tornado (1943) as Charlie Boswell
- Moon Over Las Vegas (1944) as Joe
- Hey, Rookie (1944) as Sergeant
- South of Dixie (1944) as Ernest Hatcher
- Raiders of Ghost City (1944) as Idaho Jones
- The Singing Sheriff (1944) as Squint
- High Powered (1945) as Spike Kenny
- Brewster's Millions (1945) as Hacky Smith
- The Naughty Nineties (1945) as Bailey
- Deadline at Dawn (1946) as Babe Dooley
- Gilda (1946) as Casey
- Joe Palooka, Champ (1946) as Lefty
- The Runaround (1946) as Hutchins
- Inside Job (1946) as Police Capt. Thomas
- G.I. War Brides (1946) as Sgt. Frank Moraski
- Christmas Eve (1947) as Private Detective Gimlet
- Roses Are Red (1947) as Police Lt. Rocky Wall
- Big Town After Dark (1947) as Monk
- A Double Life (1947) as Det. Pete Bonner
- If You Knew Susie (1948) as Zero Zantini
- Here Comes Trouble (1948) as Officer Ames
- Half Past Midnight (1948) as Det. Lt. Joe Nash
- Fighting Father Dunne (1948) as Steve Davis
- Coroner Creek (1948) as Frank Yordy
- Fighting Back (1948) as Police Sgt. Scudder
- The Untamed Breed (1948) as Hoy Keegan
- Two Knights from Brooklyn (1949) as Eddie Corbett (archive footage)
- The Lucky Stiff (1949) as Tony
- Kazan (1949)
- Tucson (1949) as Tod Bryant
- The Gay Amigo (1949) as Sergeant McNulty
- Stagecoach Kid (1949) as Thatcher
- Pinky (1949) as Sandz Jepson
- Deputy Marshall (1949) as Eli Cressett / Colt Redwood
- And Baby Makes Three (1949) as Motorcycle Cop (uncredited)
- The Traveling Saleswoman (1950) as Cactus Jack
- Blondie's Hero (1950) as Sgt. Gateson
- Operation Haylift (1950) as George Swallow
- Curtain Call at Cactus Creek (1950) as Jake
- The Flying Missile (1950) as Quartermaster 'Fuss' Payne
- Pride of Maryland (1951) as Knuckles
- Comin' Round the Mountain (1951) as Kalem McCoy
- As You Were (1952) as Sgt. Ames
- Indian Uprising (1952) as Sgt. Maj. Phineas T. Keogh
- Red Skies of Montana (1952) as R.A. (Pop) Miller
- Deadline – U.S.A. (1952) as Whitey Franks (uncredited)
- Mr. Walkie Talkie (1952) as Sgt. Ames
- It Came from Outer Space (1953) as Frank Daylon
- Taza, Son of Cochise (1954) as Sgt. Hamma
- Riding Shotgun (1954) as Tom Biggert
- Johnny Dark (1954) as Carl Svenson
- The Kettles in the Ozarks (1956) as Bancroft Baines
- The Killing (1956) as Mike O'Reilly
- The Challenge of Rin Tin Tin (1958) as Sgt. 'Biff' O'Hara
- New Comedy Showcase (TV series, 1960, Season 1 Episode 7 "Maisie") as Master Sergeant Blackenhorn
- North to Alaska (1960) as Land Commissioner
- How the West Was Won (1962) as Riverboat Officer (uncredited)
