= William Bendix =

American actor (1906–1964)

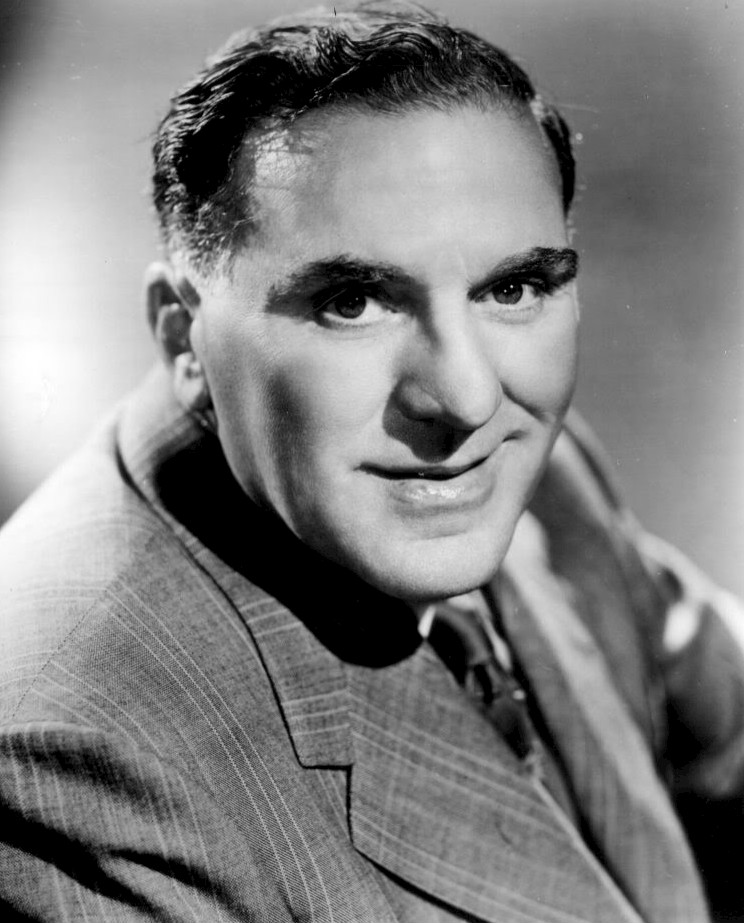
- Bendix in 1960
- Born: January 14, 1906; New York City, U.S.
- Died: December 14, 1964 (aged 58); Los Angeles, California, U.S.
- Resting place: San Fernando Mission Cemetery, Mission Hills, Los Angeles
- Occupation: Actor
- Years active: 1936–1964
- Spouse: Theresa Stefanotti (m. 1927)
- Children: 2

William Bendix (January 14, 1906 – December 14, 1964) was an American film, radio, and television actor, known for his portrayals of rough, blue-collar characters. He gained significant recognition for his role in Wake Island, for which he was nominated for the Academy Award for Best Supporting Actor. Bendix is also remembered for playing Chester A. Riley, the earnest and clumsy aircraft plant worker, in both the radio and television versions of The Life of Riley. Additionally, he portrayed baseball legend Babe Ruth in The Babe Ruth Story. Bendix frequently co-starred with Alan Ladd, appearing in ten films together; both actors died in 1964.

== Early life ==
Bendix was born in Manhattan, the only child of Oscar and Hilda (Carnell) Bendix, and was named William after his German paternal grandfather. His uncle was composer, conductor, and violinist Max Bendix. In the early 1920s, Bendix was a batboy for the New York Yankees and said he saw Babe Ruth hit more than 100 home runs at Yankee Stadium. However, he was fired after fulfilling Ruth's request for a large order of hot dogs and soda before a game, which resulted in Ruth being unable to play that day. He worked as a grocer until the Great Depression.

== Career ==
=== Film ===
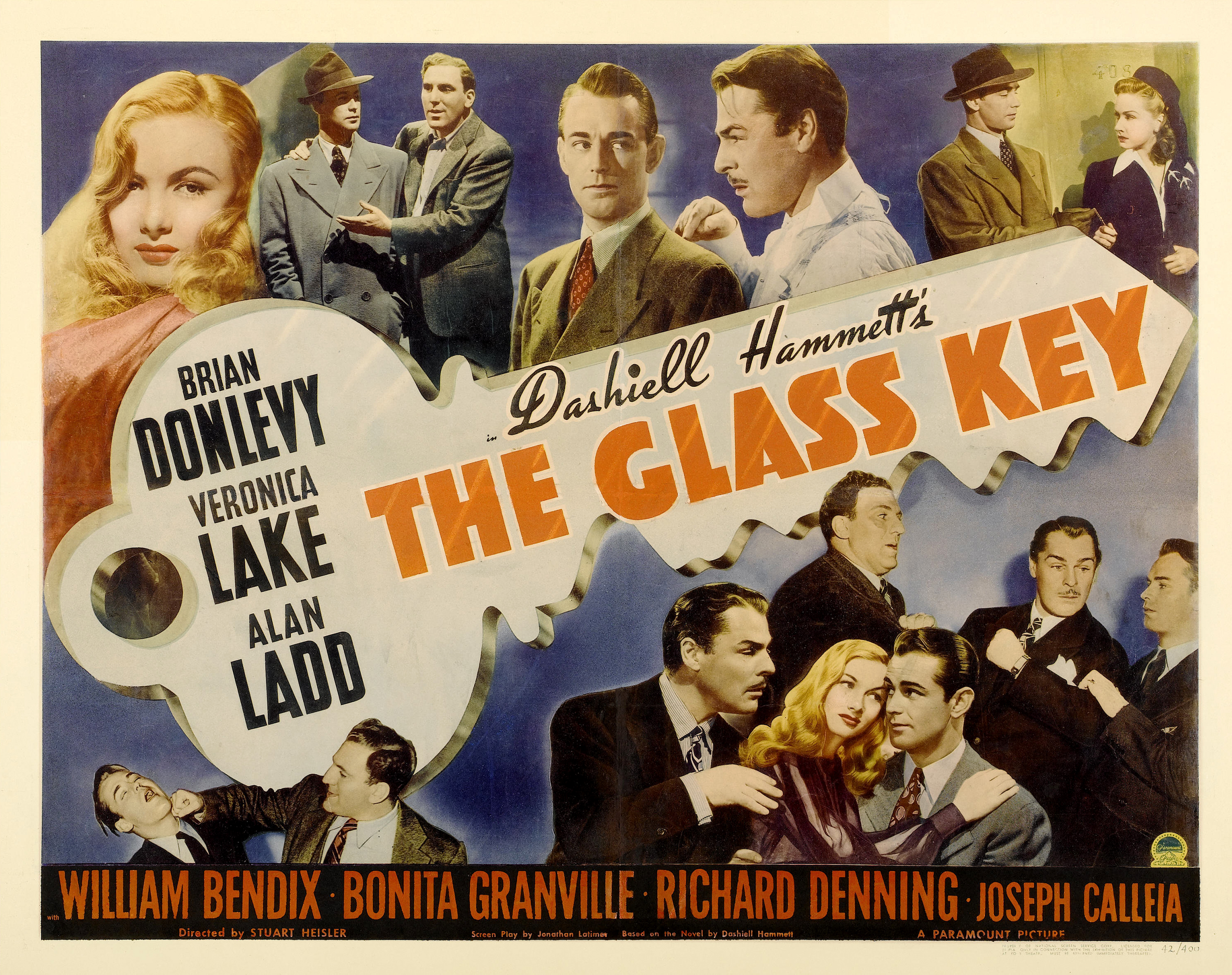
Poster for The Glass Key (1942)

Bendix began his acting career at age 30 in the New Jersey Federal Theatre Project. He made his film debut in 1942. He played in supporting roles in dozens of Hollywood films, usually as a warm-hearted gangster, detective or serviceman. He began with appearances in films noir, including a supporting role in The Glass Key (1942), which featured Brian Donlevy, Alan Ladd and Veronica Lake in the leads. He soon gained attention after appearing in Alfred Hitchcock's Lifeboat (1944) as Gus, a wounded and dying American sailor. He was the top-billed lead in The Hairy Ape (1944) based upon the Eugene O'Neill play, also starring Susan Hayward and Dorothy Comingore. He was cast in The Blue Dahlia (1946), appearing for the second time alongside Ladd and Lake.

Bendix's other film roles include his portrayal of Babe Ruth in The Babe Ruth Story (1948) – a film roundly considered one of the worst sports biopics in film history. He played Nick the bartender in the film version of William Saroyan's The Time of Your Life (1948) starring James Cagney. Bendix had appeared in the stage version, but in the role of Officer Krupp (a role played on film by Broderick Crawford). He played Sir Sagramore opposite Bing Crosby in A Connecticut Yankee in King Arthur's Court (1949), in which he took part in the trio, "Busy Doing Nothing". He also starred in a film adaptation of his radio program The Life of Riley (1949).

=== Radio and television ===
Bendix's appearance in the Hal Roach-produced film The McGuerins from Brooklyn (1942), playing a rugged blue-collar man, led to his best-remembered role. Producer and creator Irving Brecher saw Bendix as the perfect personification of Chester A. Riley, giving a second chance to a show whose audition failed when the sponsor spurned Groucho Marx for the lead. With Bendix stumbling, bumbling, and skating almost perpetually on thin ice, stretching the patience of his otherwise loving wife and children, The Life of Riley was a radio hit from 1944 through 1951. In 1950 Bendix brought an adaptation of the film version to Lux Radio Theatre.

The show began as a proposed Groucho Marx radio series, The Flotsam Family, but the sponsor balked at what would have been essentially a straight head-of-household role for the comedian. Then creator and producer Irving Brecher saw Bendix as taxicab company owner Tim McGuerin in The McGuerins from Brooklyn. Brecher stated: "He was a Brooklyn guy and there was something about him. I thought, This guy could play it. He'd made a few films, like Lifeboat, but he was not a name. So I took The Flotsam Family script, revised it, made it a Brooklyn Family, took out the flippancies and made it more meat-and-potatoes, and thought of a new title, The Life of Riley. Bendix's delivery and the spin he put on his lines made it work." The reworked script cast Bendix as blundering Chester A. Riley, a wing riveter at the fictional Cunningham Aircraft plant in California. His frequent exclamation of indignation – "What a revoltin' development this is!" – became one of the catchphrases of the 1940s. It was later reused by Benjamin J. Grimm of the Fantastic Four.

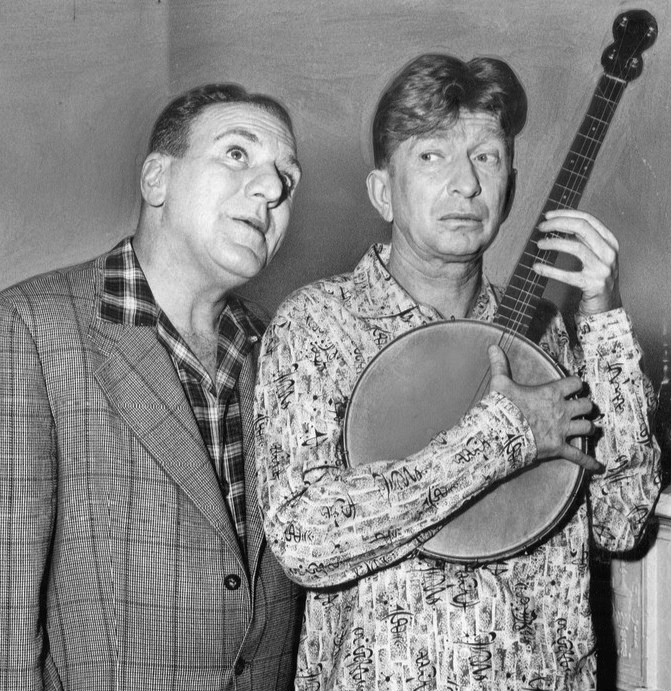
Bendix as Riley with Sterling Holloway, 1957

Bendix was not able to play the role on television because of a contracted film commitment. The part instead went to Jackie Gleason and aired a single season beginning in October 1949. Despite winning an Emmy award, the show was canceled, in part because Gleason was less acceptable as Riley, since Bendix had been so identified with the part on radio. In 1953, Bendix became available for a new television version, and this time the show was a hit. The second television version of The Life of Riley ran from 1953 to 1958, long enough for Riley to become a grandfather.

On the 1952 television program This Is Your Life, hosted by Ralph Edwards, Bendix was claimed to be a descendant of the 19th-century composer Felix Mendelssohn.

Bendix played the lead in Rod Serling's "The Time Element" (1958), a time-travel adventure episode about a man who travels back to 1941 and unsuccessfully tries to warn everyone in Honolulu about the impending attack on Pearl Harbor; the program's success opened the doors for Serling's later series The Twilight Zone. Bendix also appeared on The Ford Show, Starring Tennessee Ernie Ford (also 1958). He returned for a second appearance on October 1, 1959, the fourth-season premiere of the series, in which he and Tennessee Ernie Ford performed a comedy skit about a safari.

In NBC's Wagon Train ("Around the Horn", 1958), Bendix played the captain of a sailing cargo ship who shanghaied Major Adams (Ward Bond), Bill Hawks (Terry Wilson) and Charlie Wooster (Frank McGrath), forcing them to work on his ship. On November 16, 1959, Bendix appeared on NBC's color broadcast of The Steve Allen Plymouth Show with Jack Kerouac. A color videotape of the broadcast survives. Bendix starred in all 17 episodes of the NBC Western series Overland Trail (1960) in the role of Frederick Thomas "Fred" Kelly. He guest-starred in an episode of Mister Ed ("Pine Lake Lodge", 1961) which served as a backdoor pilot for a proposed sitcom that was not picked up.

In the fall of 1964, an American situation comedy starring Bendix and Martha Raye was scheduled to air on CBS, but due to Bendix's shaky health, the network decided not to air the program. This action resulted in a lawsuit from Bendix for $2.658 million in May, with the actor stating that the decision hurt his career and that he was in excellent health and could perform all of the requirements of the agreement. The case was settled out of court. Bendix died on December 14, 1964, of complications from pneumonia.

== Personal life ==
Bendix married a childhood friend, Theresa Stefanotti, on October 22, 1927. They remained married until his death 37 years later in 1964. The couple had a daughter, Lorraine, and adopted another, Stephanie.

Bendix died in Los Angeles at age 58 in 1964 as the result of a chronic stomach ailment that brought on malnutrition and ultimately lobar pneumonia. He was interred at the San Fernando Mission Cemetery in Mission Hills, Los Angeles.

During the 1944 presidential election campaign, Bendix attended a reception organized by David O. Selznick in support of the Dewey-Bricker ticket as well as Governor Earl Warren of California. Politically, Bendix was a registered Republican who was active in conservative Hollywood circles, being both a member of the Hollywood Republican Committee and the Motion Picture Alliance for the Preservation of American Ideals, a conservative, anti-communist organization active during the Hollywood blacklist era.

Upon his death a requiem mass was held on December 17, 1964 in Our Lady of Grace Church in Encino, California. Bendix was a devout Roman Catholic.

== Complete filmography ==
Year	Film	Role	Director	Notes
1940	They Drive by Night	Truck Driver Watching Pinball Game	Raoul Walsh	uncredited
1942	Brooklyn Orchid	Timothy "Tim" McGuerin	Kurt Neumann	
1942	Woman of the Year	"Pinkie" Peters	George Stevens	
1942	Wake Island	Pvt. Aloysius K. "Smacksie" Randall	John Farrow	Best Supporting Actor nomination
1942	The Glass Key	Jeff	Stuart Heisler	
1942	Who Done It?	Detective Brannigan		
1942	Star Spangled Rhythm	Herman the Husband in Bob Hope Skit	Paul Weatherwax	
1942	The McGuerins from Brooklyn	Timothy 'Tim' McGuerin	Kurt Neumann	
1943	The Crystal Ball	Biff Carter	Elliott Nugent	
1943	Taxi, Mister	Tim McGuerin	Kurt Neumann	
1943	China	Johnny Sparrow	John Farrow	
1943	Hostages	Underground Leader	Frank Tuttle	
1943	Guadalcanal Diary	Corp. Taxi Potts	Lewis Seiler	
1944	Lifeboat	Gus Smith	Alfred Hitchcock	
1944	Skirmish on the Home Front	Herb Miller		short
1944	The Hairy Ape	Hank Smith	Alfred Santell	
1944	Abroad with Two Yanks	Biff Koraski	John E. Burch (assistant)	
1944	Greenwich Village	Danny O'Mara	Walter Lang	
1945	It's in the Bag	William Bendix	Richard Wallace	
1945	Don Juan Quilligan	Patrick Michael "Don Juan" Quilligan	Frank Tuttle	
1945	A Bell for Adano	Sgt. Borth	Henry King	
1945	Duffy's Tavern	William Bendix	Hal Walker	
1946	Sentimental Journey	Donnelly — Uncle Don	Walter Lang	
1946	The Blue Dahlia	Buzz Wanchek	George Marshall	
1946	The Dark Corner	Stauffer a.k.a. Fred Foss	Henry Hathaway	
1946	White Tie and Tails	Larry Lundie	Charles Barton [1]	
1946	Two Years Before the Mast	First Mate Amazeen	John Farrow	
1946	Rough But Hopeful	Himself		short
1947	I'll Be Yours	Wechsberg	William A. Seiter	
1947	Calcutta	Pedro Blake	John Farrow	
1947	Blaze of Noon	Porkie Scott	John Farrow	
1947	The Web	Lt. Damico	Michael Gordon	
1947	Variety Girl	Himself	George Marshall	
1947	Where There's Life	Victor O'Brien	Sidney Lanfield	
1948	The Time of Your Life	Nick	H. C. Potter	
1948	The Babe Ruth Story	George Herman 'Babe' Ruth	Roy Del Ruth	
1948	Race Street	Lt. Barney Runson	Edwin L. Marin	
1948	10,000 Kids and a Cop	Neighborhood Policeman		short documentary
1949	Cover Up	Sheriff Larry Best	Alfred E. Green	
1949	The Life of Riley	Chester A. Riley	Irving Brecher	
1949	A Connecticut Yankee in King Arthur's Court	Sir Sagramore	Tay Garnett	
1949	Streets of Laredo	Reuben "Wahoo" Jones	Leslie Fenton	
1949	The Big Steal	Capt. Vincent Blake	Don Siegel	
1949	Johnny Holiday	Sgt. Walker	Willis Goldbeck	
1950	Kill the Umpire	Bill "Two Call" Johnson	Lloyd Bacon	
1951	Gambling House	Joe Farrow	Ted Tetzlaff	
1951	Detective Story	Det. Lou Brody	William Wyler	
1951	Submarine Command	CPO Boyer	John Farrow	
1952	A Girl in Every Port	Timothy Aloysius "Tim" Dunnovan	Chester Erskine	
1952	Macao	Lawrence C. Trumble	Nicholas Ray	
1952	Blackbeard the Pirate	Ben Worley	Raoul Walsh	
1954	Dangerous Mission	Chief Ranger Joe Parker	Louis King	
1955	Crashout	Van Morgan Duff	Lewis R. Foster	
1956	Battle Stations	Buck Fitzpatrick		
1958	The Deep Six	"Frenchy" Shapiro	Rudolph Maté	
1959	Idol on Parade	Sgt. Lush	John Gilling	
1959	The Ransom of Red Chief	Bill Driscoll		TV movie
1959	The Rough and the Smooth	Reg Barker	Robert Siodmak	
1961	Johnny Nobody	James Ronald Mulcahy	Nigel Patrick	
1961	The Phony American	Sergeant Harrigan, USAF	Ákos Ráthonyi	
1962	Boys' Night Out	Slattery	Michael Gordon	
1963	For Love or Money	Joe Fogel	Michael Gordon	
1963	The Young and the Brave	Sgt. Peter L. Kane	Francis D. Lyon	
1964	Law of the Lawless	Sheriff Ed Tanner	William F. Claxton	
1965	Young Fury	Blacksmith, Joe	Christian Nyby	Released posthumously

== Partial television credits ==
- The Life of Riley (1953–1958)
- Westinghouse Desilu Playhouse: "The Time Element" (TV series, 1958) as Peter Jenson
- The Untouchables: "The Tri-State Gang" (TV series, 1959) as Wally Legenza
- Overland Trail, a 1960 Western series starring Bendix and Doug McClure

== Dramatic radio appearances ==
- Cavalcade of America (1952) -- Portraying Lou Diamond in The Marine Who Was 200 Years Old

Year	Program	Episode/source
February 28, 1944	Lux Radio Theatre	Guadalcanal Diary
January 23, 1950	Lux Radio Theatre	I'll Be Yours
May 8, 1950	Lux Radio Theatre	Life Of Riley
