= Flying with Music =

1942 film by George Archainbaud

- Directed by: George Archainbaud
- Screenplay by: Louis S. Kaye; M. Coates Webster
- Produced by: Hal Roach
- Starring: Marjorie Woodworth; George Givot; William Marshall; Edward Gargan; Jerry Bergen; Norma Varden
- Cinematography: Robert Pittack
- Edited by: Richard C. Currier
- Music by: Edward Ward
- Production company: Hal Roach Studios
- Distributed by: United Artists
- Release date: May 22, 1942
- Running time: 46 minutes
- Country: United States
- Language: English

Flying with Music is a 1942 American musical film directed by George Archainbaud and written by Louis S. Kaye and M. Coates Webster. The film stars Marjorie Woodworth, George Givot, William Marshall, Edward Gargan, Jerry Bergen and Norma Varden. The film was released on May 22, 1942, by United Artists.

== Plot ==
Entertainer Harry Bernard is in the Caribbean being pursued by a policeman accompanied by a guide and interpreter who does not wish to end his payment, so allows Harry to get away. Fate gives Harry a chance to escape when a guide nervous about flying lets Harry take his place on a Boeing 314 Clipper travelling through the islands. The passengers comprise five beautiful women and their chaperone, Miss Mullens. One of the girls, Ann, is being pursued romantically by the clipper's pilot, but she is only interested in meeting a singer who she has only heard on the radio.

== Cast ==
- Marjorie Woodworth as Ann Andrews
- George Givot as Harry Bernard
- William Marshall as Pilot Don Terry
- Edward Gargan as Joe
- Jerry Bergen as Wilbur
- Norma Varden as Miss Mullens
- Claudia Drake as Jill Parker
- Jane Kean as Bobbie
- Jayne Hazard as Jane
- Dorothy Kelly as Mary
