= Edward Ward (composer) =

- Born: April 3, 1896; St. Louis, Missouri
- Died: September 26, 1971 (aged 71) Hollywood, California
- Genres: Film score
- Occupations: Film composer, musical director
- Spouse: Yola d'Avril (m. 1930; div. 1941)

Edward Ward (April 2, 1896– September 26, 1971) was an American film composer and music director who was nominated for seven Academy Awards.

== Academy Award nominations ==
- 1939 Best Original Song for "Always and Always" from Mannequin
- 1942 Best Scoring of a Dramatic Picture (Cheers for Miss Bishop)
- 1942 Best Scoring of a Dramatic Picture (Tanks a Million)
- 1942 Best Scoring of a Musical Picture (All-American Co-Ed)
- 1943 Best Original Song for "Pennies for Peppino" from Flying with Music
- 1943 Best Scoring of a Musical Picture (Flying with Music)
- 1944 Best Scoring of a Musical Picture (Phantom of the Opera)

== Additional credits ==
- Paris (1929)
- No, No, Nanette (1930)
- Kismet (1930)
- Great Expectations (1934)
- The Bishop Misbehaves (1935)
- The Mystery of Edwin Drood (1935)
- San Francisco (1936)
- Camille (1936)
- The Gorgeous Hussy (1936)
- Night Must Fall (1937)
- Maytime (1937)
- Saratoga (1937)
- A Yank at Oxford (1938)
- The Shopworn Angel (1938)
- Boys Town (1938)
- The Women (1939)
- Ali Baba And The Forty Thieves (1944)
- Gypsy Wildcat (1944)
- Ghost Catchers (1944)
- It Happened on 5th Avenue (1947)
- The Babe Ruth Story (1948)
- Man of a Thousand Faces (1957)
