= Kurt Neumann (director) =

German-American film director (1908–1958)

- Born: 5 April 1908; Nuremberg, German Empire
- Died: 21 August 1958 (aged 50); Los Angeles, California, U.S.
- Occupation(s): Film director, screenwriter, film producer

Kurt Neumann (5 April 1908 – 21 August 1958) was a German film director, screenwriter, and producer who spent much of his career in the United States. He was a prolific director of genre films from the 1930s through the 1950s, totaling over 60 feature film credits during that time. He was the principal director of the Tarzan films for many years, and specialized in science fiction films in his later career.

== Early life ==
Born in Nuremberg, he was the son of a manufacturer of tin stamps, and he studied music in several German cities, including Berlin. In 1926, he directed his first short film.

== Career ==
Neumann came to the United States in the early sound era, hired to direct German-language versions of Hollywood films. Once he mastered English and established himself as technically proficient in filmmaking, Neumann directed movies such as The Big Cage (1932), Secret of the Blue Room (1933) with Paul Lukas and Gloria Stuart, Hold 'Em Navy (1936), It Happened in New Orleans (1936) with child star Bobby Breen, Wide Open Faces (1937) with Joe E. Brown, Island of Lost Men and Ellery Queen: Master Detective in 1939.

Neumann was signed by producer Hal Roach in 1941 to direct a series of "streamliners", 45-minute features designed to fill out short double bills. Among these four-reel comedies were About Face (1942), Brooklyn Orchid (1942), Taxi, Mister? (1943) and Yanks Ahoy (1943). Two Knights from Brooklyn (1949) is compiled from two of those streamliners: The McGuerins from Brooklyn and Taxi, Mister.

In 1945, he joined the company of producer Sol Lesser, who engaged Neumann as coproducer and principal director of the Tarzan series produced by Lesser from 1945 to 1954. The Tarzan films were produced for RKO and starred Johnny Weissmuller and later Gordon Scott.

Neumann became known as a specialist in science-fiction movies due to his producing and directing Rocketship X-M (1950, about an expedition to the Moon and Mars) and The Fly (1958, about a scientist's teleportation experiment that transforms him into a fly creature). Neumann directed other sci-fi and horror films such as Kronos (1957) and She Devil (1957), and directed other films such as The Ring (1952) an independent feature co-starring Rita Moreno, Carnival Story (1954), Mohawk (1956), and The Deerslayer (1957).

During that decade, Neumann also returned to his native Germany to direct several films, including Circus of Love (1954) with Eva Bartok and Curd Jürgens. He directed They Were So Young (also 1954), a West German and US co-production.

== Death ==
Contrary to some published reports, Neumann did not die as a result of suicide, but rather from natural causes in Los Angeles on 21 August 1958, five weeks after filming of The Fly concluded. He was inurned at the Chapel of the Pines Crematory in Los Angeles.

== Partial filmography ==
(Neumann credited as director unless otherwise noted)

- The Big Cage (1933)
- Secret of the Blue Room (1933)
- Let's Sing Again (1936)
- Espionage (1937)
- Make a Wish (1937)
- That Navy Spirit (1937)
- Touchdown, Army (1938)
- Island of Lost Men (1939)
- Unmarried (1939)
- Brooklyn Orchid (1942)
- Tarzan and the Amazons (1945)
- Tarzan and the Leopard Woman (1946)
- Tarzan and the Huntress (1947)
- The Dude Goes West (1948)
- Bad Men of Tombstone (1949)
- Bad Boy (1949)
- Two Knights from Brooklyn (1949)
- Rocketship X-M (1950)
- The Kid from Texas (1950)
- Cattle Drive (1951)
- The Ring (1952)
- Son of Ali Baba (1952)
- Hiawatha (1952)
- Tarzan and the She-Devil (1953)
- Regina Amstetten (West Germany, 1954)
- Three from Variety (West Germany, 1954)
- Carnival Story (1954)
- Circus of Love (West Germany, 1954)
- They Were So Young (USA/West Germany, 1954)
- The Star of Rio (West Germany, 1955)
- Mohawk (1956)
- Kronos (1957)
- She Devil (1957)
- The Fly (1958)
- Machete (1958)
- Watusi (1959)
- Counterplot (1959)
