= Irene Dare =

American figure skater and film actress (1931–2020)

Irene Dare (born Irene Davidson, February 14, 1931 — May 29, 2020) was an American figure skater and film actress. In the late 1930s, she was described as "a small edition of Sonja Henie" and "closer to being 'another Shirley Temple' than anybody in recent years."

== Life and career ==
Dare was born as Irene Davidson on February 14, 1931. Her parents were Mr. and Mrs. Harry B. Davidson, neither of whom was a skater. She initially took lessons in acrobatic dancing. and was "very fond" of that activity. After a figure-skating teacher who was a friend of the family saw her dance, he suggested that she try skating. His instruction started her on the road to Hollywood.

Before she began working in films, Dare performed in ice shows—17 by the time she was 6 years old -- and skated at a New York club and at Madison Square Garden. Newsreels of the MSG performance were seen by a talent scout, leading to Dare's film contract.

In 1938, at age 5, Dare was the world's youngest figure skater. At that point, she had been skating for 1 1/2 years and had appeared in 16 ice shows. Also that year, Principal Productions announced plans to make a film of Hans Brinker or the Silver Skates with Bobby Breen in the title role and Dare portraying Greta.

Film producer Sol Lesser learned about Dare from friends and watched her perform in New York, after which he eventually got her under contract to make films.

Dare's film debut came in Breaking the Ice (1938). Dare's scenes in the film included dances, somersaults, spins, and whirls on ice in elaborate sequences. Her first starring role came in Everything's on Ice (1939). She also performed in the film Silver Skates (1943).

In 1939, Dare had a six-year film contract for $1,200 per week. She also performed in the Ice Vanities show in December 1941.

Dare died in Pacifica, California on May 29, 2020, at the age of 89.
