= The Big Gamble =

The Big Gamble may refer to:

- The Big Gamble (1931 film)
- The Big Gamble (1961 film)
