= Rainbow on the River =

1936 film by Kurt Neumann

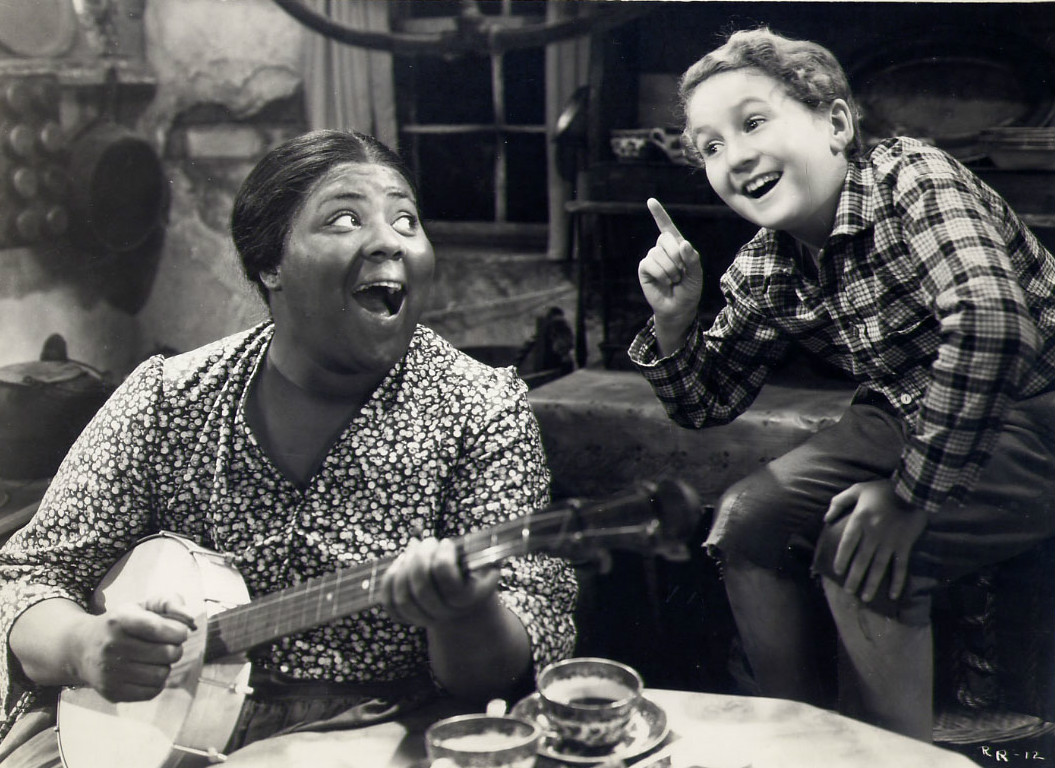
- Louise Beavers and Bobby Breen in a scene from the film
- Directed by: Kurt Neumann; George Sherman
- Screenplay by: Harry Chandlee; Earle Snell; William Hurlbut
- Based on: the novel, Toinette's Philip by C. V. Jamison
- Produced by: Sol Lesser; Edward Gross
- Starring: Bobby Breen; May Robson; Charles Butterworth
- Cinematography: Charles Schoenbaum
- Edited by: Robert Crandall
- Music by: Hugo Riesenfeld
- Production companies: Bobby Breen Productions; Principal Productions
- Distributed by: RKO Radio Pictures
- Release dates: December 17, 1936 (Premiere-New York City); December 25, 1936 (US)
- Running time: 91 minutes
- Country: United States
- Language: English

Rainbow on the River (also known as It Happened in New Orleans) is a 1936 American musical film directed by Kurt Neumann from a screenplay by Harry Chandlee, Earle Snell, and William Hurlbut, based upon the novel Toinette's Philip by C. V. Jamison. Produced by Bobby Breen Productions and Principal Productions, the movie was premiered in New York City on December 17, 1936, and released nationwide by RKO Radio Pictures the following week on Christmas Day. The film stars Bobby Breen, May Robson and Charles Butterworth.

== Plot summary ==
An orphan raised by a former slave in the South is forced to live with unfamiliar relatives in the North.

== Cast ==
- Bobby Breen as Philip Ainsworth
- May Robson as Mrs. Harriet Ainsworth
- Charles Butterworth as Barrett
- Alan Mowbray as Ralph Layton
- Benita Hume as Julia Layton
- Henry O'Neill as Father Josef
- Louise Beavers as Toinette
- Marilyn Knowlden as Lucille Layton
- Lillian Yarbo as Seline (uncredited)

== Critical reception ==
Frank S. Nugent of the The New York Times described the film is as "a sentimental and song-drenched nosegay", and observed, "It's just as sweet as sweet can be. Yesterday's audience seemed to enjoy it immensely." He commented that Bobby Breen "has developed a singing style as unreal as it is precocious" and wrote, "The most alarming vocal phenomenon of the day, curly haired Bobby sings as though he hopes each note will break a crystal ball somewhere in the rear of the orchestra."

In their March, 1937 edition, Modern Screen gave the film a two-star review and wrote: "Bobby Breen, the boy sensation of the airwaves, casts his magic spell once more on the screen in a film so dripping in sentiment that it will no doubt send women weeping from all the theatres in the land." It concluded with "Critical comment on Master Breen is useless; either you like him or despise him. May Robson comes through with her customary gruffness. Marilyn Knowlden is excellent as the spoiled brat, and Charlie Butterworth lends humor to a thankless comedy role. Alan Mowbray is wasted in a small part."
