= Let's Sing Again =

1936 film by Kurt Neumann

- Directed by: Kurt Neumann
- Written by: Daniel Jarrett; Don Swift
- Produced by: Sol Lesser (producer)
- Starring: Bobby Breen; Henry Armetta; Vivienne Osborne.
- Cinematography: Harry Neumann
- Edited by: Robert O. Crandall
- Music by: Hugo Riesenfeld
- Production company: RKO Radio Pictures
- Distributed by: RKO Radio Pictures
- Release date: May 8, 1936
- Running time: 70 minutes
- Country: United States
- Language: English

Let's Sing Again is a 1936 American musical drama film directed by Kurt Neumann and starring Bobby Breen, Henry Armetta and Vivienne Osborne. It was produced and distributed by RKO Pictures.

== Plot ==
An orphan (eight-year-old boy soprano Bobby Breen) gets a chance to sing opera in New York.

== Cast ==
- Bobby Breen as Billy Gordon
- Henry Armetta as Joe Pasquale
- George Houston as Leon Alba
- Vivienne Osborne as Rosa Donelli
- Grant Withers as Jim 'Diablo' Wilkins
- Inez Courtney as Marge Wilkins
- Lucien Littlefield as Supt. Henry Perkins
- Richard Carle as Carter
- Clay Clement as Jackson
- Ann Doran as Alice Alba

== Soundtrack ==
- "Let's Sing Again" (Music by Jimmy McHugh, lyrics by Gus Kahn)
- "Lullaby" (Music by Hugo Riesenfeld, lyrics by Selma Hautzik)
- "Farmer in the Dell" (Music by Samuel Pokrass, lyrics by Charles O. Locke)
