= The Last Night of the Barbary Coast =

The Last Night of the Barbara Coast
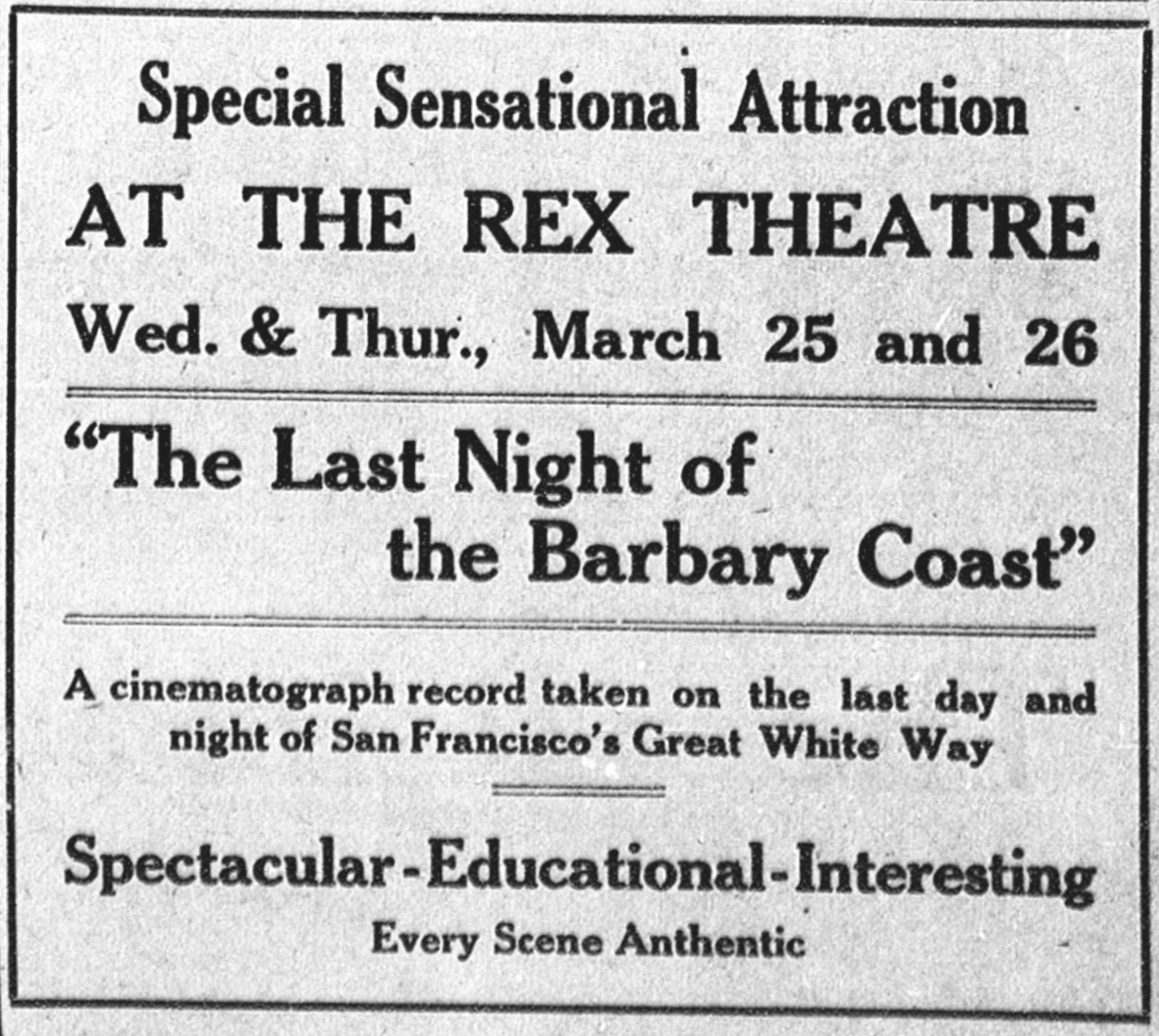
- Newspaper advertisement
- Directed by: Sol Lesser
- Produced by: Sol Lesser
- Cinematography: Hal Mohr
- Production company: Sol Lesser Productions
- Distributed by: Progressive Film Co.
- Release date: December 1913
- Country: United States
- Languages: Silent film English intertitles

The Last Night of the Barbary Coast (1913) was an early example of the exploitation film, showing what was purported to be the last night of the Barbary Coast red-light section of San Francisco. In reality, the Barbary Coast wasn't shut down until 1917.

The film, directed by Hal Mohr and Sol Lesser, is now considered a lost film. Mohr (a native of San Francisco himself), later an Academy Award winner, did the cinematography, and Lesser went on to become a Hollywood producer.

== See also ==
- List of lost films
