= Sol Lesser =

American film producer (1890–1980)

- Sol Lesser ca. 1920
- Born: February 17, 1890; Spokane, Washington, U.S.
- Died: September 19, 1980 (aged 90); Hollywood, California, U.S.
- Resting place: Hillside Memorial Park, Culver City, California
- Occupation: Film producer
- Years active: 1913–1958
- Spouse: Fay Grunauer Lesser (1913–?) (2 children)
- Children: Julian Lesser (1915–2005); Marjorie Lesser Fasman

Sol Lesser (February 17, 1890 – September 19, 1980) was an American film producer. He received a star on the Hollywood Walk of Fame in 1960 and was awarded the Jean Hersholt Humanitarian Award in 1961.

== Biography ==
In 1913, while living in San Francisco, Sol Lesser learned that the authorities were about to clean out the Barbary Coast district, a raucous area of gambling houses, saloons and brothels. He grabbed a camera and a friend, future Hollywood cameraman Hal Mohr, and roamed the area, especially the parts that were best-known before the area was shut down. (The Barbary Coast was not actually closed down until 1917.) This film is now considered a lost film.

The resulting film was The Last Night of the Barbary Coast, an early example of an exploitation film that was sold directly to movie theater owners by Lesser. With the profits from the film, he bought several theaters, and soon owned a cinema chain.

Sol Lesser signed Jackie Coogan to a movie contract in 1922, establishing both as major Hollywood names. The Coogan-Lesser hits included Oliver Twist and Peck's Bad Boy. Lesser made a successful transition to sound films, with his own Principal Pictures company; he would either distribute his productions himself under the Principal name, or arrange for a major studio to release them under their own trademarks (as with his Buck Jones westerns and his 1938 novelty western The Terror of Tiny Town, all released by Columbia). In 1933, Lesser produced Thunder Over Mexico a compilation film made from Eisenstein's Que Viva Mexico! with the permission of Upton Sinclair, who had commissioned the Soviet film maker, and his wife.

His productions usually had higher budgets than the usual independent features; Lesser was able to produce entire series with name stars like George O'Brien and Bobby Breen. He also produced serials in 1933 and 1934. Lesser was very successful as an independent producer, later releasing through United Artists. notably with the films Our Town (1940) and the all-star wartime revue Stage Door Canteen (1943).

== Tarzan ==
In 1933 Lesser succeeded in buying screen rights to Edgar Rice Burroughs' Tarzan character. A Tarzan the Fearless serial with screen newcomer Buster Crabbe resulted, but Burroughs, deciding to make his own Tarzan films, refused to renegotiate with Lesser. Burroughs's own movie enterprises were short-lived, and the rights passed to Metro-Goldwyn-Mayer.

Burroughs sold Lesser options on all his Tarzan novels for seven years, with Lesser producing one Tarzan film a year for 20th Century-Fox. Only one Tarzan film was produced under this arrangement: Tarzan's Revenge (1938) featuring athletes Glenn Morris and Eleanor Holm.

After MGM objected to him competing with its own Tarzan series, Lesser agreed to sell the rights back to the studio. However, after MGM relinquished those rights in 1942, Lesser regained ownership of the Tarzan property, producing new films featuring the character for RKO, which starred Johnny Weissmuller, and later Lex Barker and Gordon Scott.

Having dedicated himself to these jungle adventures for the remainder of his career, Lesser sold the Tarzan rights to producer Sy Weintraub in 1958, and retired. "I had reached the age that one either finishes on top or far below. I decided I would end on top, and I was satisfied," he said.

Toward the end of his life he was actively involved in restoring many of his early productions, often in association with film preservationists at Blackhawk Films. Blackhawk reprinted many of Lesser's silent and sound films for the home-movie market.

Sol Lesser died in 1980, and was buried at Hillside Memorial Park in Culver City, California.

== Accolades ==
Sol Lesser was the recipient of The Jean Hersholt Humanitarian Award in 1960. He has a star on the Hollywood Walk of Fame.

== Filmography ==
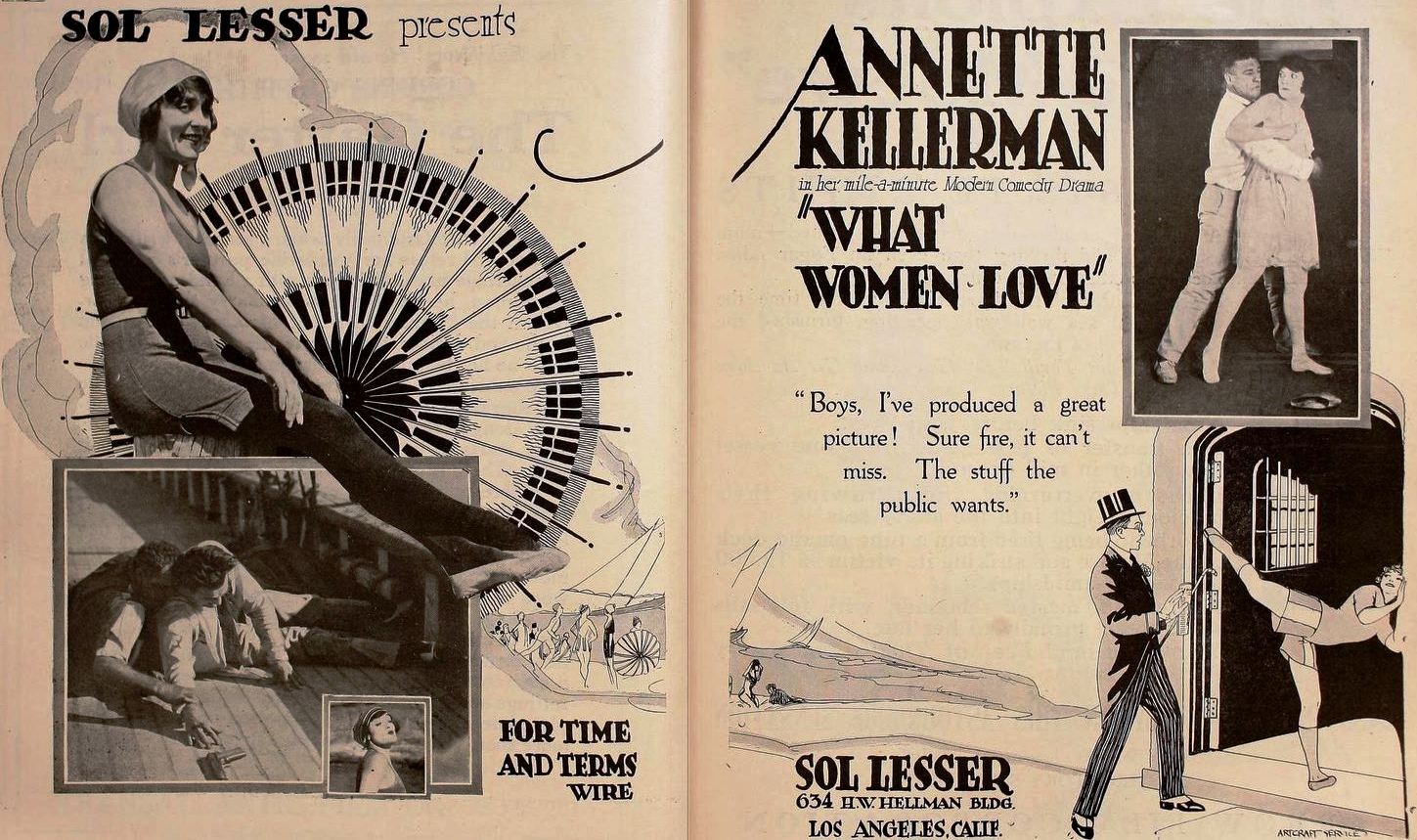
Ad for What Women Love (1920)

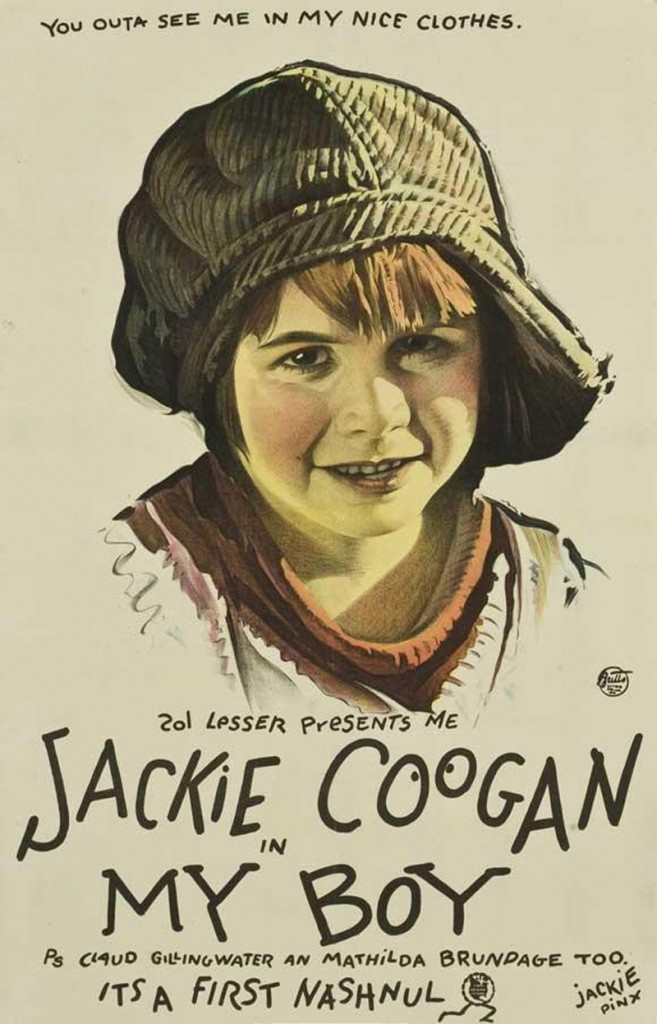
Poster for My Boy (1922)

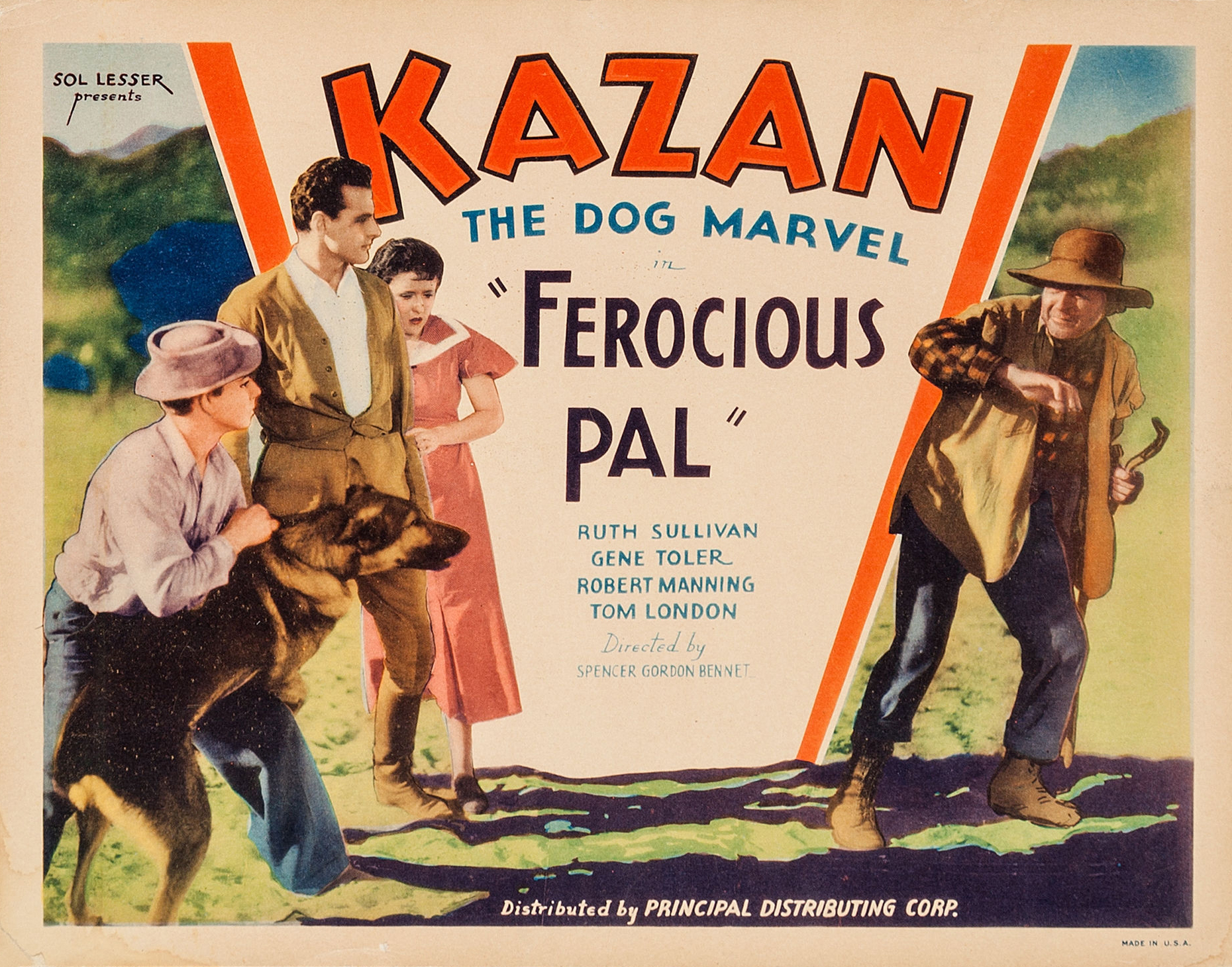
Lobby card for Ferocious Pal (1934)

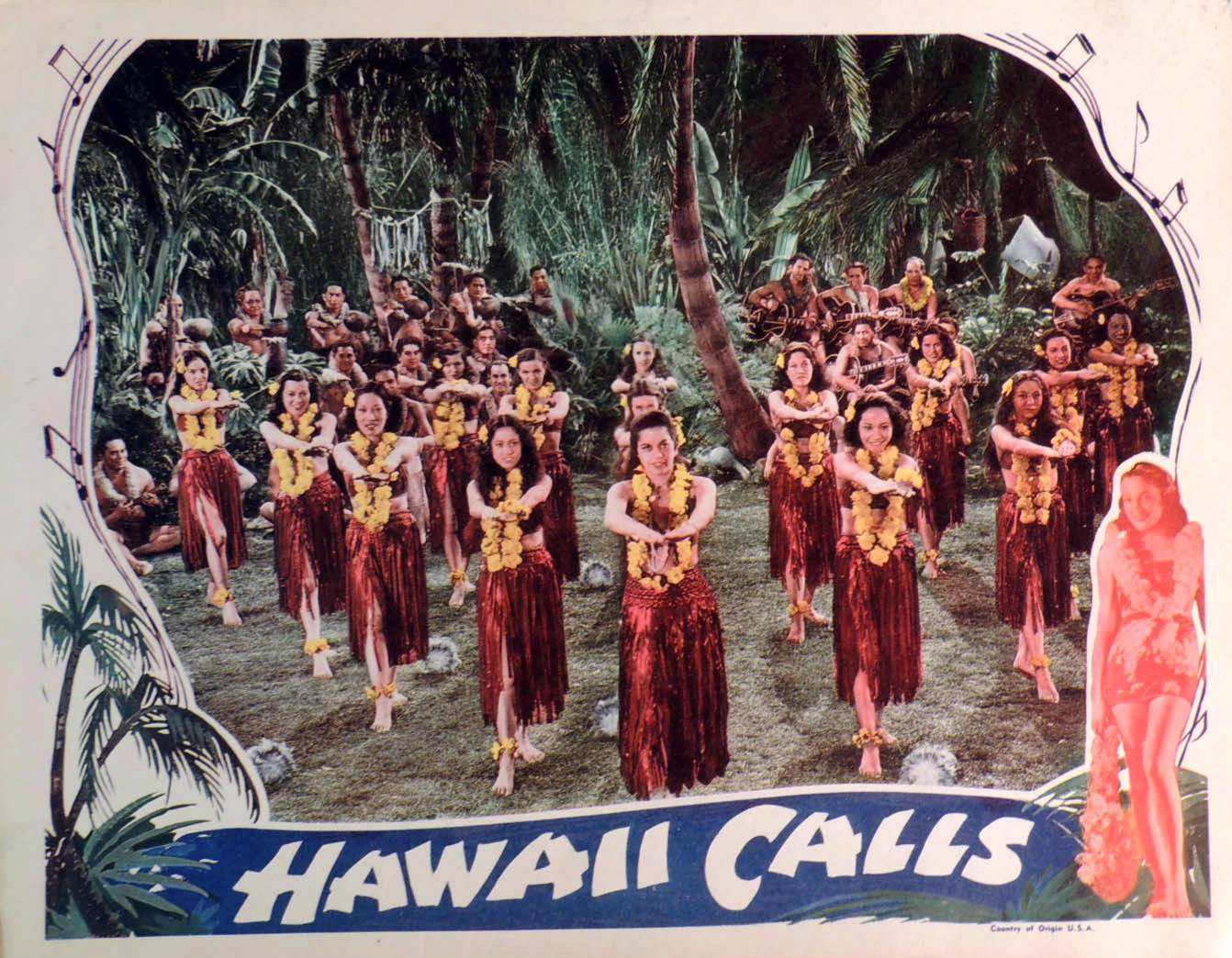
Lobby card for Hawaii Calls (1938)

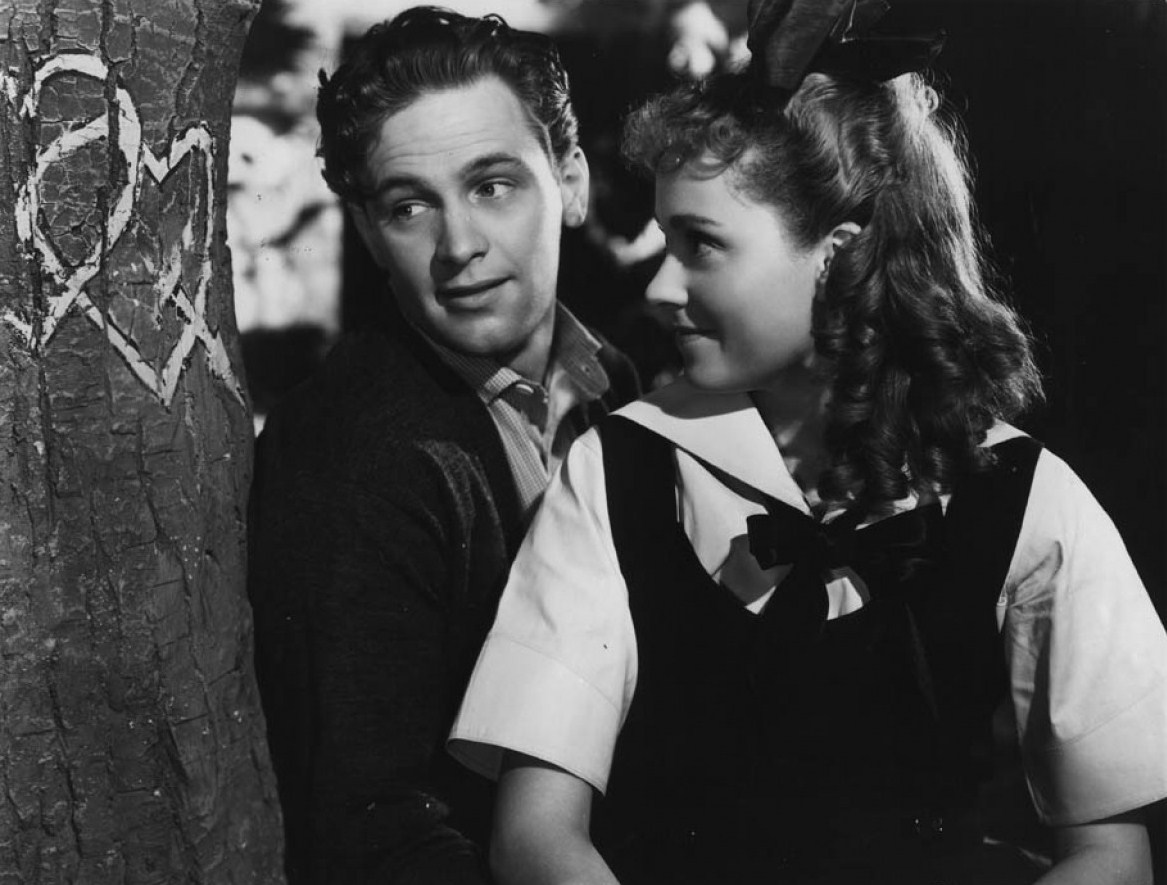
William Holden and Martha Scott in Our Town (1940)

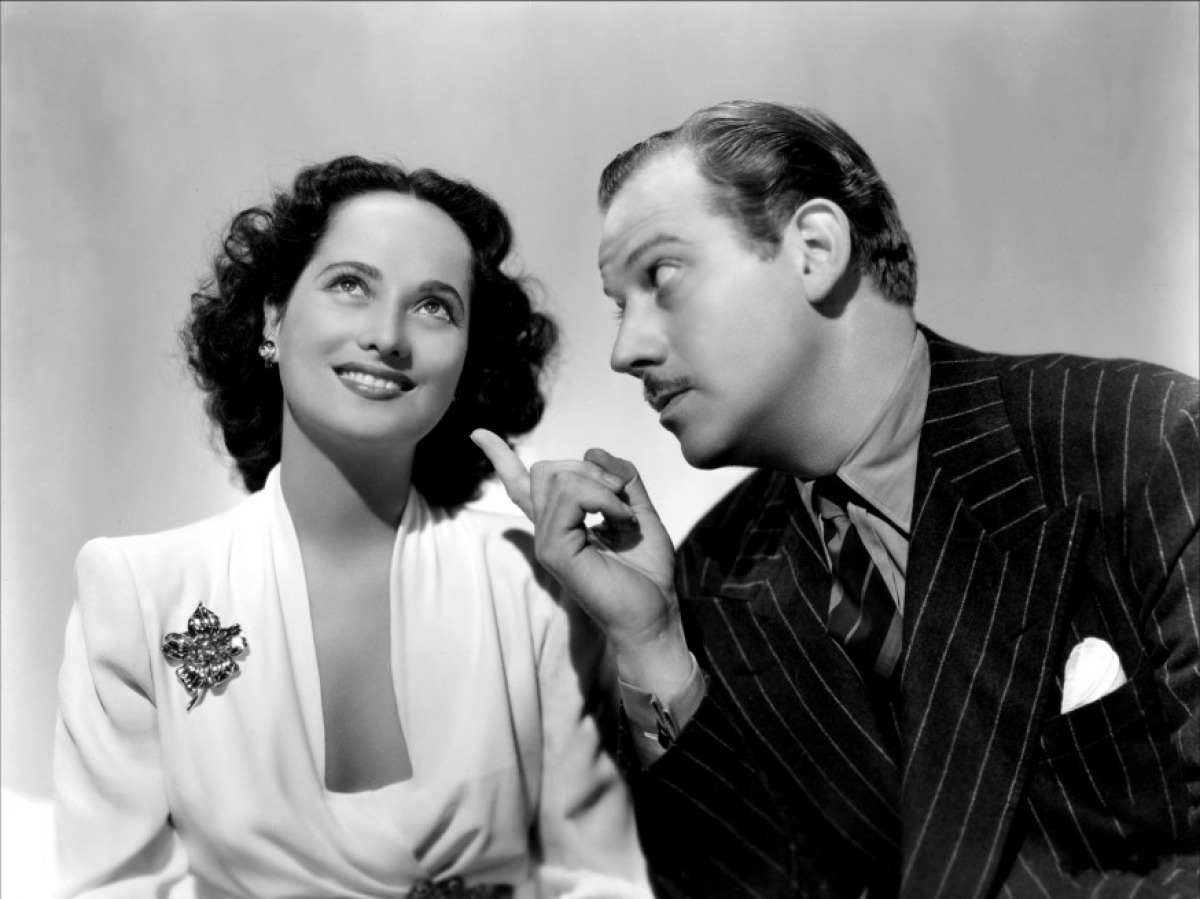
Merle Oberon and Melvyn Douglas in That Uncertain Feeling (1941)

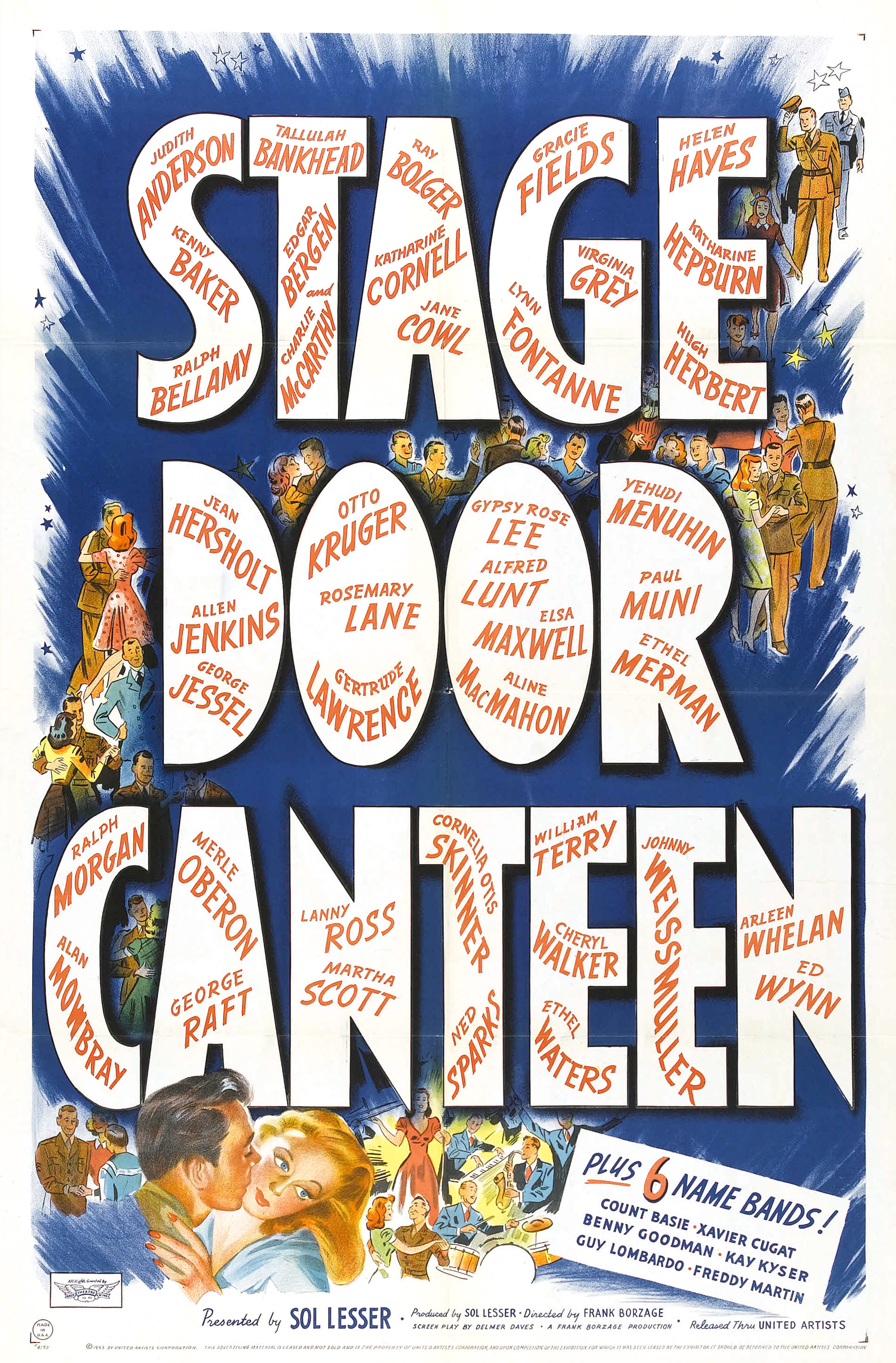
Poster for Stage Door Canteen (1943)

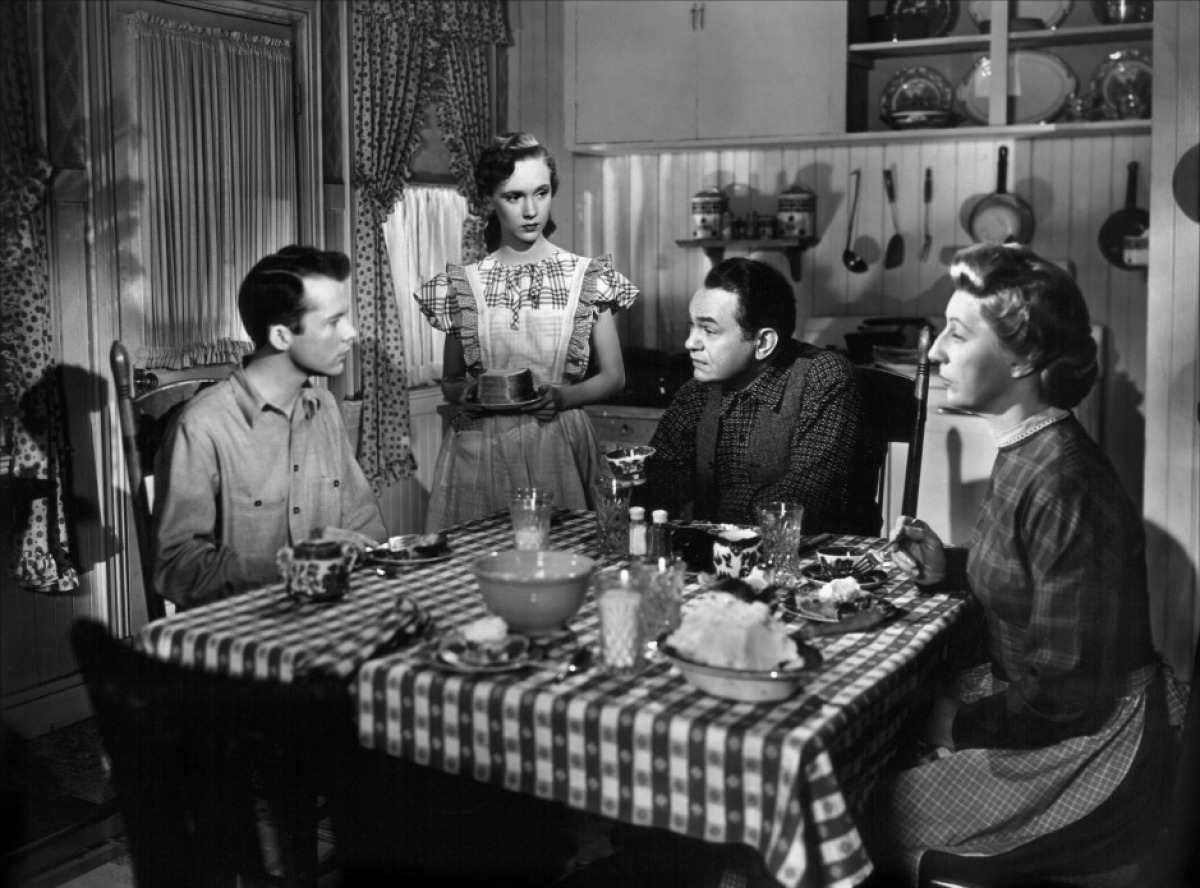
Lon McCallister, Allene Roberts, Edward G. Robinson and Judith Anderson in The Red House (1947)

Year	Title	Notes
1920	What Women Love	
1921	One Man in a Million	
1922	My Boy	
1922	The World's a Stage	
1922	Oliver Twist	
1922	Trouble	
1922	Bing Bang Boom	
1923	Circus Days	
1923	Daddy	
1923	The Drug Traffic	
1924	Captain January	
1924	Helen's Babies	
1924	The Mine with the Iron Door	
1924	When a Man's a Man	
1925	The Re-Creation of Brian Kent	
1925	Balto's Race to Nome	
1930	The Eyes of the World	
1932	South Sea Adventures	
1932	With Williamson Beneath the Sea	
1932	The Amazon Head Hunters	
1933	Jaws of Justice	
1933	Matto-Grosso	
1933	Thunder Over Mexico	
1933	Tarzan the Fearless	Serial
1933	The Return of Chandu	Serial
1934	Peck's Bad Boy	
1934	Ferocious Pal	
1934	Fighting to Live	
1934	Chandu on the Magic Isle	
1934	The Dude Ranger	
1935	Hard Rock Harrigan	
1935	Thunder Mountain	
1935	Whispering Smith Speaks	
1935	When a Man's a Man	
1935	The Cowboy Millionaire	
1935	The Calling of Dan Matthews	
1936	Let's Sing Again	
1936	Rainbow on the River	
1936	O'Malley of the Mounted	
1937	The Californian	
1937	Make a Wish	
1937	Western Gold	
1937	Roll Along, Cowboy	
1937	Secret Valley	
1937	It Happened Out West	
1938	Breaking the Ice	
1938	Hawaii Calls	
1938	Rawhide	
1938	Tarzan's Revenge	
1938	Peck's Bad Boy with the Circus	
1938	Panamint's Bad Man	
1938	Hawaiian Buckaroo	
1939	Fisherman's Wharf	
1939	Way Down South	
1939	Everything's on Ice	
1939	Escape to Paradise	
1940	Our Town	
1941	That Uncertain Feeling	
1942	The Tuttles of Tahiti	
1943	Stage Door Canteen	
1943	Tarzan's Desert Mystery	
1943	Tarzan Triumphs	
1944	Three Is a Family	
1945	Tarzan and the Amazons	
1947	Tarzan and the Leopard Woman	
1947	The Red House	
1947	Tarzan and the Huntress	
1948	Tarzan and the Mermaids	
1949	Tarzan's Magic Fountain	
1950	Tarzan and the Slave Girl	
1950	Kon-Tiki	Academy Award, Best Documentary Feature
1951	Tarzan's Peril	
1952	Tarzan's Savage Fury	
1952	Under the Red Sea	
1952	Without Warning!	
1953	Tarzan and the She-Devil	
1953	Vice Squad	
1953	The 3D Follies	
1955	Quest for the Lost City	
1955	Tarzan's Hidden Jungle	
1957	Man on the Prowl	
1957	X the Unknown	
1958	Tarzan's Fight for Life	
1958	Tarzan and the Trappers	TV pilot
