= Fisherman's Wharf (film) =

1939 film directed by Bernard Vorhaus

- Theatrical poster for the film
- Directed by: Bernard Vorhaus
- Written by: Bernard Schubert; Ian McLellan Hunter; Herbert Clyde Lewis
- Produced by: Sol Lesser
- Starring: Bobby Breen; Leo Carrillo; Lee Patrick; Slicker, "the silly seal"
- Cinematography: Charles Schoenbaum; William Dietz (backgrounds)
- Edited by: Arthur Hilton
- Music by: Victor Young
- Production companies: Bobby Breen Productions; Principal Productions
- Distributed by: RKO Radio Pictures
- Release dates: January 25, 1939 (Premiere-San Francisco); February 3, 1939 (US)
- Running time: 72 minutes
- Country: United States
- Language: English

Fisherman's Wharf is a 1939 American drama film directed by Bernard Vorhaus from a screenplay by Bernard Schubert, Ian McLellan Hunter, and Herbert Clyde Lewis. The film stars Bobby Breen, Leo Carrillo, Lee Patrick, and Slicker, "the silly seal". Produced by Sol Lesser for RKO Radio Pictures, who also distributed the film, it was released on February 3, 1939.

== Plot ==
Carlo Roma has a happy household with his son, Tony, despite being widowed. The two enjoy a very deep bond. Along with a pet seal, Julius, the father and son live with one of Carlo's business partners, Beppo, and a housekeeper, Angelina. Beppo has been romantically interested in Angelina for decades and is constantly proposing to her, which she always declines. He runs a successful fishing fleet of three boats, one of which Beppo captains. His other two equal partners are Luigi and Pietro.

When Stella, Carlo's widowed sister-in-law, moves in with her son Rudolph, the harmony of the home is disrupted. First, Stella banishes Julius from the house. Stella then drives both Beppo and Angelina from the house. After leaving, Angelina finally consents to Beppo and the two marry. Stella, not being satisfied with the money being made from Carlo's fishing enterprise, convinces him to demote his three partners to simple employees. Disgruntled, the three leave to begin their own fishing business.

As a last straw, Rudolph has been extremely unkind to Tony. When Rudolph learns that Tony is not Carlo's biological son, he cruelly tells him. The disheartened child runs away from home, taking Carlo's fishing boat. Carlo finally understands what has been happening in his house, and orders Stella and Rudolph to leave. With the help of Beppo, the two track down Tony and the family is reunited.

== Cast ==
- Bobby Breen as Tony Roma
- Leo Carrillo as Carlo Roma
- Henry Armetta as Beppo
- Lee Patrick as Stella
- Rosina Galli as Angelina
- Tommy Bupp as Rudolph
- George Humbert as Pietro
- Leon Belasco as Luigi
- Slicker, the seal as Julius
- Dorr's St. Luke's Choristers

== Production ==
An August 1938 news item let the public know that Breen was attached to the picture, which went on to state that production would begin on September 15 of that year. In October it was reported that Bernard Vorhaus would helm the film. And by late that month, Leo Carillo's participation had been announced. Armetta was added to the cast in early November, while other cast members announced in November included Slicker the seal and Lee Patrick. The Reverend Neal Dodd, who performed hundreds of screen wedding ceremonies, would conduct his three hundredth in this film, overseeing the screen nuptials between Beppo and Angelina. In December it was announced that the St. Luke's Episcopal Church Choristers, also known as Dorr's St. Luke's Choristers, would be appearing in the film. Fisherman's Wharf premiered in San Francisco on January 25, 1939. In attendance were the three stars, Bobby Breen, Leo Carillo, and Henry Armetta, along with Sol Lesser. The film opened nationwide on February 3, 1939. The National Legion of Decency rated the film a class A-1, making it suitable for all audiences.

== Reception ==
Harrison's Reports called the picture a "pleasant mixture of comedy and drama, with deep human appeal." They felt it was one of Breen's best performances to date, and lauded both Carillo and Armetto for excellent performances. They also enjoyed Galli's musical performance in the film, as well as the contributions of the trained seal, Slicker. The Film Daily described it as a fine sentimental comedy, which had all "the ingredients of a sentimental tear jerker, but..." the producer decided to emphasize the comedic aspect instead, which they felt was a good move. They complimented both the cast and the direction. Motion Picture Daily, in their review of the film, lauded the acting skills of Carillo, Armetta, and Breen, and called the song, "Songs of Italy", with words and music by Frank Churchill and Paul F. Webster, "outstanding." Overall, they felt the film was a "charming picture of a father and son's mutual devotion."
