= Everything's on Ice =

1939 film

- Directed by: Erle C. Kenton
- Written by: Adrian Landis; Sherman L. Lowe
- Produced by: Sol Lesser
- Starring: Edgar Kennedy; Lynne Roberts
- Cinematography: Russell Metty
- Edited by: Arthur Hilton
- Music by: Amedeo De Filippi; Max Terr
- Distributed by: RKO Pictures
- Release date: October 6, 1939 (United States)
- Running time: 65 minutes
- Country: United States
- Language: English

Everything's on Ice is a 1939 American musical film produced by Sol Lesser for RKO Pictures, directed by Erle C. Kenton and stars six year old Irene Dare, Edgar Kennedy and Lynne Roberts. The film was released on October 6, 1939, and is also known as Frolics on Ice (American video title).

A 6-year-old skater is financially exploited in this story, which features "the world's youngest ice figure-skater, Irene Dare." Meanwhile, the girl's older sister "suddenly finds her love-life taken over by a kibitzing uncle ... [leading to] a succession of laughable situations."

== Plot ==
Felix Miller (Roscoe Karns) has another money making scheme, this time it involves his 6 year old figure skating niece Irene Barton (Irene Dare). Given his history, her family doesn't take him seriously. Uncle Felix takes little Irene to skate for a talent scout from Florida and secures not only a job but train tickets for the entire family to Florida for her gig. While on the train Irene's sister, Jane (Lynne Roberts) and Felix meet Leopold Eddington (Eric Linden) who has just inherited a million dollars but Felix assumes he doesn't have any money because Leopold tells them he is staying at an inexpensive hotel. Irene's dad Joe Barton (Edgar Kennedy) stays behind in New York to continue working at the barber shop he's trying to buy.

Uncle Felix wastes no time spending the paycheck that results from little Irene's skating performances at the Silver Palms Café, he checks them into the finest hotel in the area and spares no expense on clothing, jewelry and food. Leopold attends Irene's first performance hoping to talk with Jane again, but Felix brushes him off and makes fun of him. Later Felix meets Harrison Gregg (George Meeker) in the steam room and assumes he's very wealthy when in fact Harrison can't even pay for his hotel bill. Meanwhile, Leopold and Jane are spending time getting to know each other, later Felix convinces Leopold to stay away from Jane and enjoy the rest of his vacation. Unable to secure another advance on Irene's pay, spendthrift Felix sends a telegram to his brother-in-law Joe asking for $200 and promises him that the family will be "fixed for life". Joe does not believe him for a minute and travels to Florida to find out for himself what's really going on. Meanwhile, Felix is trying to arrange a marriage between reluctant Jane and Harrison.

Joe arrives to discover that Felix is throwing an expensive cocktail party and has taken several advances on Irene's pay. Felix is trying to get either Joe or Harrison will pay their outstanding expenses. Joe also discovers that his wife Elsie (Mary Hart) has been a willing partner to Felix's spending, and they argue. Joe meets Leopold and finds out that he intended to marry his daughter, and Joe encourages him to go after "Janie". Felix and Elsie find out that the barbershop that Joe had wanted to buy has been sold to someone else, but they're more worried about themselves than they are about Joe. Meanwhile, Irene has been fired from her skating gig because there is no one to finance her performances.

Joe arranges for Leopold to see Janie one last time before leaving Florida although Felix has arranged for her to see Harrison at the side entrance (he's trying to skip out on his hotel bill). Joe insists his wife return everything she's bought, and the manager of the hotel tries to collect the money owed for the cocktail party and the other expenses. Felix claims that Harrison will be paying for it, but the hotel manager lets Felix know that Harrison can't even pay for his hotel bill, plus he's nowhere to be found. Irene announces that Leopold will be financing her next performance although Felix doesn't believe it. Irene's governess confirms that Leopold is a very wealthy man, and both Felix and Elsie are speechless. Meanwhile, Jane and Leopold have not only eloped but have bought the barbershop for Joe as a birthday present. Felix and Harrison are now working in the hotel kitchen to pay off their expenses.

== Cast ==
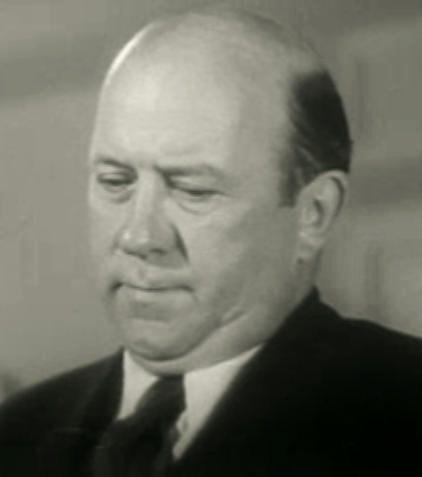
Edgar Kennedy as Joe Barton

- Irene Dare as Irene Barton
- Edgar Kennedy as Joe Barton
- Roscoe Karns as Felix Miller
- Lynne Roberts as Jane Barton
- Eric Linden as Leopold Eddington
- Mary Hart as Elsie Barton
- George Meeker as Harrison Gregg
- Bobby Watson as French
- Mary Currier as Miss Tillifer
- Maxine Stewart as Hat Check Girl
- Wade Boteler as White
- Pierre Watkin as Hotel Manager
- Larry Jackson as Papa Penguin
- Kenny Williams as Dr. Penguin

== Songs ==
- "Birth of a Snowbird, music by Victor Young and Paul Webster
- "Everything's on Ice", music by Milton Drake and Fred Stryker
