= Herbert Clyde Lewis =

American journalist

Herbert Clyde Lewis (15 August 1909 - 17 October 1950) was an American novelist.

== Life ==
Lewis was born in New York City, the son of Hyman and Clara Lewis, Yiddish-speaking Russian immigrants.

He lived in China, working as a reporter on the Shanghai Evening Post in 1930 and on The China Press, Shanghai, in 1931 and 1932.

He returned to New York City and married Gita Jacobson in December, 1933. They had two children, Michael and Jane.

He worked as a reporter for the New York Journal, but quit to work as an independent writer. Although he sold several stories to Esquire, he was forced to declare bankruptcy by the time he sold his first novel, Gentleman Overboard, to the Viking Press in 1937.

He moved to Hollywood and worked as a scenario writer for MGM in 1937. He contributed to the screenplay for the 1939 film Fisherman's Wharf and wrote the original story for Escape to Paradise. He returned to New York City in 1939 and worked for the J. Walter Thompson advertising agency. He returned to reporting, joining the news staff of the New York Herald Tribune in 1942.

He returned to Hollywood in 1942 after 20th Century Fox bought the film rights to his story,Two-Faced Qulligan for $25,000. The story was originally published in Story. It was filmed in 1945 as Two-Faced Quilligan. His story D-Day in Las Vegas was made into the movie Lady Luck (1946), and he contributed to the screenplay for Free for All (1949), which was based on his story, Patent Applied For.

His most notable accomplishment in Hollywood was his story The Fifth Avenue Story, which he sold to the director Frank Capra. Capra in turn sold it to Roy Del Ruth, who filmed it in 1947 as It Happened on 5th Avenue. Lewis and his co-writer, Frederick Stephani, were nominated for the 1947 Academy Award for Best Story. They lost to Valentine Davies, who won for Miracle on 34th Street.

Lewis suffered a nervous breakdown in 1948 and was unable to work for a year after. He returned to New York in 1949 and was working as a contributing editor of Time magazine when he died of a heart attack at age 41.

== Works ==
Lewis published three novels between 1937 and 1940. Gentleman Overboard was a black comedy about a Wall Street banker who falls overboard while travelling on a freighter in the South Pacific and drowns. Time magazine's reviewer wrote of the book, "His hair-raising little tour de force is the more effective for being so quietly, matter-of-factly written." Ansgar Allen, in his review of the book following republication in 2021, referred to the narrative as remarkable for its flat emotion and detachment in the face of the desperation of a drowning man.

His second novel, Spring Offensive, was an anti-war piece that depicted the sufferings of an American serving in the British Army who becomes trapped between lines on the day of the first German assault on the Maginot Line. At the time of its publication, the Phony War was still going on along the French-German border, but within weeks the German Blitzkrieg attack on France and the Low Countries took place and the novel was quickly forgotten.

His third novel, Season's Greetings, follows the inhabitants of a Greenwich Village rooming house on a Christmas Eve. Its theme is “the problem of loneliness in a city of eight million people,” as one character puts it.

Lewis' last novel, Silver Dark, which tells the story of a romance between two people with physical deformities, was published posthumously in 1959 by Pyramid Books. Budd Schulberg praised it as "A genuinely interesting and compelling novel".

== Bibliography ==
=== Novels ===
- Gentleman Overboard (1937); Norwich : UEA Publishing Project, 2021, introduction by George Szirtes, ISBN 978-1-913861-23-0
- Spring Offensive (1940)
- Season's Greetings (1941)
- Silver Dark (1959)
