= It Happened on 5th Avenue =

1947 film by Roy Del Ruth

- Theatrical release poster
- Directed by: Roy Del Ruth
- Screenplay by: Everett Freeman; Vick Knight (additional dialogue)
- Story by: Herbert Clyde Lewis; Frederick Stephani
- Produced by: Roy Del Ruth
- Starring: Don DeFore; Ann Harding; Charles Ruggles; Victor Moore; Gale Storm
- Cinematography: Henry Sharp
- Edited by: Richard Heermance
- Music by: Edward Ward
- Production company: Roy Del Ruth Productions
- Distributed by: Allied Artists
- Release dates: April 19, 1947; May 16, 1947 (Los Angeles)
- Running time: 116 minutes
- Country: United States
- Language: English
- Budget: $1.2–$1.3 million
- Box office: $1.8 million (estimated)

It Happened on 5th Avenue (titled onscreen as It Happened on Fifth Avenue) is a 1947 American romantic comedy film directed by Roy Del Ruth and starring Don DeFore, Ann Harding, Charles Ruggles, Victor Moore and Gale Storm. The film follows a clever vagrant as he helps several strangers take shelter in a vacant New York City mansion during the Christmas holidays, unwittingly inviting the mansion's owner and his family to stay with them.

Herbert Clyde Lewis and Frederick Stephani were nominated for the Academy Award for Best Story, losing to Valentine Davies for another Christmas-themed film, Miracle on 34th Street.

== Plot ==
Vagrant Aloysius T. McKeever lives in the Fifth Avenue mansion of industrial magnate Michael J. O'Connor, the world's second richest man, whenever O'Connor winters at his Virginia estate. McKeever allows ex-G.I. Jim Bullock and 18-year-old runaway Trudy (who is actually O'Connor's daughter) to live in the mansion. Jim and Trudy fall in love. Because of a housing crisis, Jim invites war buddies Whitey, Hank, and their families to share the vast mansion until they can find homes of their own.

When Trudy encounters her father, she tells him that she is in love with Jim and that she has been lying to Jim about her identity because she wants to win his love without her wealth. Trudy persuades her father to pretend to be a homeless man named Mike and to move into the house. McKeever reluctantly admits Mike but treats him as a servant. When Mike becomes angry and wants the squatters vacated, Trudy calls her mother Mary (who divorced O'Connor several years earlier) in Palm Beach for help. Mary comes to New York and pretends to be another homeless person to join the squatters. Sensing that Mary and Mike have feelings for each other, McKeever nudges them together. Mike reconciles with Mary and proposes marriage again, and she accepts.

Earlier, McKeever had shared with Jim, Whitey, and Hank an idea to convert unused postwar Army barracks into housing, and had persuaded them to bid for an Army camp on the outskirts of New York City. Jim and his friends raise money from many other G.I.s in the same predicament. O'Connor also wants the property to build a transportation hub, and a bidding war ensues. Attempting to repel his daughter's suitor, who is still unaware of Trudy's real identity, O'Connor arranges to have the construction company reject Jim's conversion plan. Instead, they offer Jim a well-paying job in Bolivia but he must remain single. Unwilling to abandon Trudy, his country, nor his fellow veterans, Jim rejects the offer.

Celebrating Christmas Eve together, the residents are caught by two patrolmen who check the mansion every night. McKeever convinces them to let the families stay until the new year. Jim reveals that the camp has been sold to O'Connor and later tells Trudy that he is considering the job offer in Bolivia so that he can earn enough money to marry her, but Trudy severs their relationship. When Mary and Trudy discover that Mike had manipulated the situation, Mary tells him that she and Trudy will leave for Florida in the morning.

Ashamed, Mike tells Jim that he has arranged a meeting with O'Connor at O'Connor's office. At the meeting, Jim, Whitey, and Hank find Mike sitting at O'Connor's desk and believe that Mike is delusional, trying to stuff him into a closet before O'Connor arrives. Mike is rescued by his assistant, who reveals Mike's true identity to the three friends. Mike then transfers ownership of the camp to them, provided that they do not reveal his identity to McKeever.

That night, everyone shares a New Year's Eve dinner before restoring the house to its original state. Mike and Mary reconcile again, Trudy and Jim reconcile as well, and they all bid farewell to McKeever and his dog as he leaves to squat at O'Connor's estate in Virginia, still unaware of the truth. Mike tells Mary to remind him to patch the back fence through which McKeever accesses his property, declaring that McKeever will enter through the front door next winter.

== Cast ==
- Don DeFore as Jim Bullock
- Ann Harding as Mary O'Connor
- Charlie Ruggles as Michael J. "Mike" O'Connor
- Victor Moore as Aloysius T. McKeever
- Gale Storm as Trudy O'Connor
- Grant Mitchell as Farrow
- Edward Brophy as Patrolman Cecil Felton
- Alan Hale Jr. as Whitey Temple
- Dorothea Kent as Margie Temple
- Edward Ryan Jr. as Hank
- Cathy Carter as Alice
- Arthur Hohl as Patrolman Brady (uncredited)
- John Hamilton as Harper (uncredited)
- Charles Lane as landlord (uncredited)
- Abe Reynolds as Finkelhoff the tailor (uncredited)

== Production ==
Monogram Pictures was trying to shed its reputation for low-budget films by establishing a new division, Allied Artists Productions (renamed Allied Artists Pictures Corporation in 1953, replacing Monogram entirely), and the film was Allied Artists' first production. At a time when the average Hollywood film cost about $800,000 (and the average Monogram picture cost about $90,000), It Happened on 5th Avenue cost more than $1,200,000.

The story was originally optioned by Liberty Films in 1945 for director Frank Capra (who instead directed It's a Wonderful Life), and later that year, producer-director Roy Del Ruth acquired the story.

The casting of Ann Harding and Victor Moore was announced in June 1946 and that of Don DeFore and Gale Storm in July. Filming was conducted from August 5 to mid-October 1946. Despite the film's Christmas theme, its release was delayed until Easter 1947.

== Music ==
Gale Storm, who had been the studio's musical star for years, rehearsed the film's four songs before production began, but she was told by director Roy Del Ruth that her vocals would be dubbed by another singer. Storm recalled in her 1981 memoir:

I couldn't believe it. I thought that maybe the director didn't know I'd been singing and dancing in films, and that if I spoke to him he'd let me do my own numbers. Well, I asked him, and he said no. I asked him to look at some of my musicals, and he said no. I asked him if I could sing for him, and he said no. His theory was that if you were a dancer, you didn't sing; if you were a singer, you didn't dance; and if you were an actor, you didn't sing or dance. It was humiliating.

== Release ==
The film was first released in Miami on April 5, 1947 and was afforded a traditionally lavish Hollywood premiere on May 16, 1947 at Grauman's Chinese Theatre.

== Reception ==
In a contemporary review for The New York Times, critic Bosley Crowther praised Victor Moore's ""charming performance", writing: "Indeed, there is nothing about this picture more deserving of gratitude than Mr. Moore. Without him—or a reasonable facsimile—it would be just another hopeful try."

Critic Edwin Schallert of the Los Angeles Times wrote: "High in the sphere of the incredible, 'It Happened on Fifth Avenue' may be described as a picture that expresses a great deal of charm and that often delightfully furthers the cause of humor."

The Washington Post called It Happened on 5th Avenue a "mild, pleasant little film which probably will find many admirers."

Time wrote: "Most plausible explanations for the picture's success are: 1) the presence of Victor Moore, past master of creaky charm and pathos; 2) a show as generally old-fashioned, in a harmless way, as a 1910 mail-order play for amateurs; 3) the fact that now, as in 1910, a producer cannot go wrong with a mass audience if he serves up a whiff of comedy and a whirlwind of hokum."

The film returned an estimated $1.8 million at the box office.

== Adaptations ==
The screenplay was adapted for a radio version on Lux Radio Theater in May 1947, with DeFore, Ruggles, Moore and Storm reprising their roles, and a live television production for Lux Video Theatre in 1957, with Ernest Truex, Leon Ames, Diane Jergens and William Campbell.

The film was remade in Hindi twice in India: Pugree (1948) and Dil Daulat Duniya (1972).

== Home media ==
It Happened on 5th Avenue was part of a package of 49 Monogram and Allied Artists features from the late 1940s and early 1950s that were licensed for television broadcast in 1954.

On November 11, 2008, Warner Home Video released the film on DVD disc. In 2014, the film was made available for streaming and download in digital format. On December 22, 2020, it was released on Blu-ray disc by Warner Archive Collection.

== See also ==
- List of Christmas films
- List of films set around New Year
