= Mastermind (1976 film) =

1976 detective comedy film

- Directed by: Alex March
- Screenplay by: William Peter Blatty (as Terence Clyne); Ian McLellan Hunter (as Samuel B. West)
- Story by: William Peter Blatty (as Terence Clyne)
- Produced by: Malcolm Stuart
- Starring: Zero Mostel; Keiko Kishi; Gawn Grainger
- Cinematography: Gerald Hirschfeld
- Edited by: John C. Howard
- Music by: Fred Karlin
- Color process: Metrocolor
- Production companies: ABC Pictures; Master Associates
- Distributed by: Goldstone Film Enterprises
- Release date: September 10, 1976
- Running time: 86 minutes
- Countries: Japan; United States
- Language: English
- Budget: $2.5 million

Mastermind is a 1976 Japanese-American comedy thriller film directed by Alex March and starring Zero Mostel, Keiko Kishi and Gawn Grainger. Filmed in 1969, it sat on the shelf for seven years before receiving a limited theatrical release in 1976. It has developed a cult following since its release on home video.

The second of producer Malcolm Stuart's two-picture deal with screenwriter, William Peter Blatty, the project was inspired by the success of the 1964 Peter Sellers comedy A Shot in the Dark which Blatty had co-written with producer/director Blake Edwards. Blatty's script was drastically revised by Ian McLellan Hunter prior to production, and the disgruntled screenwriter chose the pseudonym Terence Clyne for his screen credit. By 1973 it had recorded a loss of $2.9 million. Blatty's original screenplay was published as part of a limited edition collection by Lonely Road Books in 2013 as Five Lost Screenplays by William Peter Blatty.

== Plot ==
Zero Mostel plays an inspector on the trail of criminals who have captured a robot called Schatzi played by Felix Sillas. The inspector has delusions that he is a great Samurai warrior and the film flashes back and forth between present day and ancient times.

== Cast ==
- Zero Mostel as Inspector Hoku Ichihara
- Keiko Kishi as Nikki Kono
- Gawn Grainger as Nigel Crouchback
- Bradford Dillman as Jabez Link
- Jules Munshin as Israeli Agent #1
- Furankî Sakai as Captain Yamada (as Frankie Sakai)
- Sorrell Booke as Max Engstrom
- Zaldy Zshornack as Officer Abe
- Felix Silla as Schatzi
- Phil Leeds as Israeli Agent #2
- Kichi Taki as The Monk
- Tetsu Nakamura as Mr. Hiruta (as Satoshi Nakamura)
- Chikako Natsumi as Yoko Hara
- Larry Ohashi as Police Commissioner
- Masanobu Wada as Hori
- Wataru Omae as Kozo (as Kin Omae)
- Renate Mannhardt as Bertha Tors

== Trivia ==
Co-star Jules Munshin died 6½ years before the film was finally released. Munshin died Feb. 19, 1970 at age 54 and "Mastermind" was released in September 1976.
