= Hal Mohr =

American cinematographer (1894–1974)

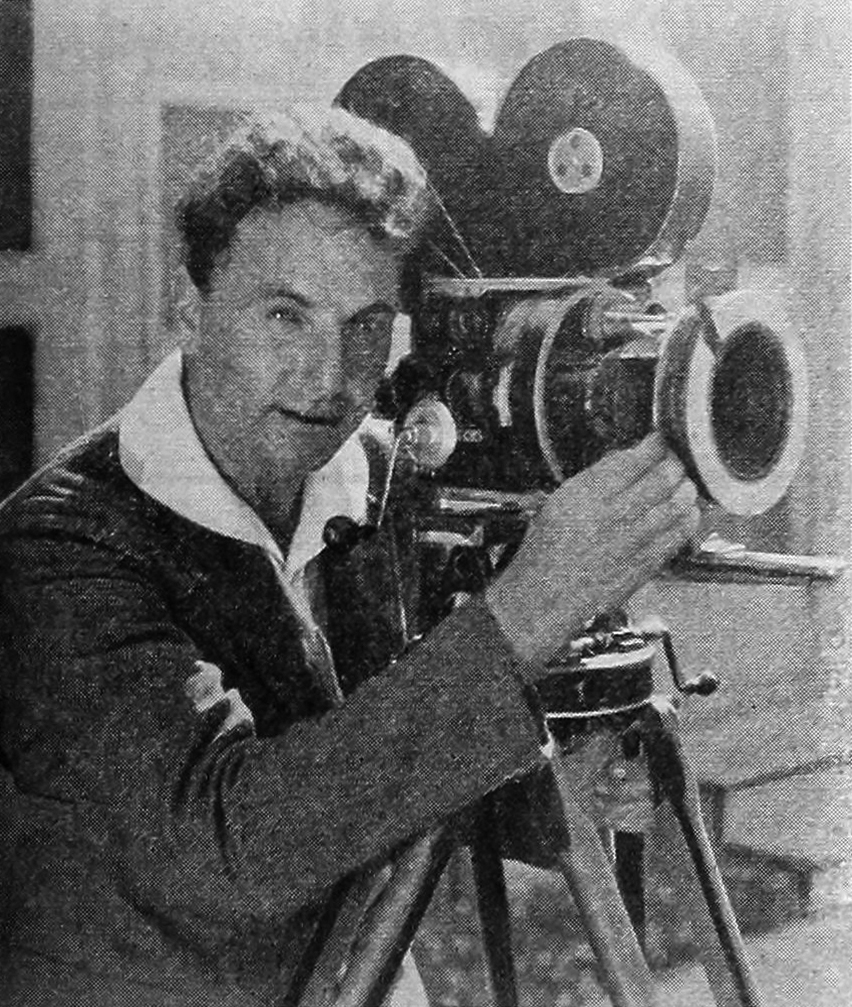
- Mohr in the early 1920s
- Born: Harold Leon Mohr; August 2, 1894; San Francisco, California, U.S.
- Died: May 10, 1974 (aged 79); Santa Monica, California, U.S.
- Occupation: Cinematographer
- Title: American Society of Cinematographers; President (1930–1931), (1963–1965), (1969–1970)
- Spouses: Winifred Ursula Aileen Gocher (m. 1919; div. 1925); Clara Eloise Loerch a.k.a. Claire Del Mar (m. 1926; div. 1929); Evelyn Venable (m. 1934)
- Children: 5
- Awards: Academy Award for Best Cinematography: A Midsummer Night's Dream (1935), The Phantom of the Opera (1943); Hollywood Walk of Fame

Harold Leon "Hal" Mohr, A.S.C. (August 2, 1894 – May 10, 1974) was a famed movie cinematographer, noted for shooting The Jazz Singer, Hollywood's landmark semi-talkie. Mohr won an Oscar for his work on the 1935 film, A Midsummer Night's Dream, another for the 1943 version of The Phantom of the Opera, and received an Oscar nomination for lensing the 1952 film of Jan de Hartog's The Fourposter.

== Early life and career ==
Born in San Francisco on August 2, 1894, Mohr was one of four children born to Rosalia (née Remarque) and Michael Mohr. He received all his formal education in his hometown, flunking out of Lowell High School, then attending San Francisco Polytechnic for over a year before dropping out for a job in the film exchange.

From a young age, Hal Mohr wanted to pursue a career in cinematography because he was curious to learn about how to make pictures move onscreen. He worked as a photo finisher in a photo lab to gain experience with the camera. When he was 19 years old, he filmed his first movie, Pam's Daughter, which was never seen by the public because of problems with the motion picture distribution company.

In 1913, in an early example of an exploitation film peddled directly to theater owners, producer Sol Lesser hired Mohr to make The Last Night of the Barbary Coast. This film purported to show the last night of the depraved Barbary Coast red-light district of San Francisco before it was shut down by the police. (The area was not closed down until 1917.) This is now considered a lost film.

Inspired by the moving shots in the Italian movie, Cabiria, Mohr developed a camera with special tracking abilities for his 1914 film, Pan's Mountain. The following year, he moved to Hollywood and began working at Universal City to gain further experience in the industry.

In 1927, Mohr filmed The Jazz Singer for Warner Brothers.

Although Mohr mainly worked as a cinema portraitist on movies such as The Wedding March, A Midsummer Night's Dream, and the Technicolor The Phantom of the Opera, he was passionate about exploring the limits of the camera. Mohr shot in deep focus years before Gregg Toland – Bullets or Ballots and The Green Pastures were both shot in deep focus.

Mohr's other cinematographer credits include Little Annie Rooney (1925), The Big Gamble (1931), Cheers for Miss Bishop (1941), Another Part of the Forest (1948) and The Wild One (1953).

=== Directing ===
On May 1, 1936, The Hollywood Reporter revealed that negotiations were underway between Mohr and Universal Pictures whereby the noted cameraman could soon be making his feature film directorial debut. The deal was inked in less than 2 weeks, but it was another six months before the film to be directed was identified by the Los Angeles Times, that being an adaptation of the Eleanore Griffin novel, Class Prophecy. With Deanna Durbin then set to star (as had been and would be numerous others prior to the eventual signing of Virginia Bruce) (Note: Others included Jane Wyatt, Ann Sothern, and, for a moment, Mohr's own wife, Evelyn Venable, a rumor promptly shot down by both husband and wife.) the story was characterized as a "light trifle" with a well-worn plotline, a characterization emphatically echoed following the March 1937 release of the film, When Love Is Young.

Yet despite understandable reservations about the film's hackneyed scenario, Mohr's treatment of that material, as witnessed at the film's March 12 preview screening at Hollywood's Pantages Theatre (documented by the trade publication, American Cinematographer), elicited "bouquets by both of the local film dailies". Variety, for its part, predicted "general audience approval as a program topper, with credit for its high average entertainment quality going to Hal Mohr for his first directorial job and to a dozen players for good performances," adding that "playing and direction give impressiveness to a rather old and timeworn tale" and that Mohr's first directing effort—as well as his "rating as associate producer" [the latter evidently not credited onscreen]—is "notably fine in getting fullest value from the material, scoring especially in the ingratiating comedy and deft blending of the musical and dramatic elements."

The Hollywood Reporter is even less restrained in its assessment (subtitled "Hal Mohr Scores With Swell Cast"), which begins by dubbing When Love Is Young "sweet entertainment from start to hilarious finish [and] one of those little pictures that makes big noises at the box office," while reserving its biggest bouquets for the film's director.

But the big news concerning this picture is that it marks a really auspicious directorial debut. Hal Mohr, long known as one of the industry’s ace cameramen, here tries his hand at direction and turns out a superb job. There are no tricks that he misses in development of characterization, and touch after touch show master light craftsmanship. Make way for an important new director.

The Reporter would revisit the subject one month later, offering a generous sampling of the New York critical response. While the nine papers represented were somewhat mixed regarding the work as a whole, the three that made mention of the film's direction were uniformly positive, starting with the Times crediting Mohr for keeping the conventionally plotted film both "fresh and crisply paced," the Daily News, which praises the entire cast while crediting its excellent ensemble work to Mohr's "alert direction", and the New York American, whose reviewer credits the "twinkling directorial touch of Hal Mohr [for making] this stenciled story [seem] not as stereotyped as it sounds”.

When Love Is Young's story, as noted, was not remarkable in and of itself; moreover, that same attention to detail, lauded by critics on both coasts, had led Mohr, over the course of a 39-day shoot and post-production, to exceed by $54,000 the film's projected cost of two hundred thousand—all of which may help explain why this first-time Hollywood helmsman never did get the opportunity to build on his promising rookie effort.

=== Honors ===
Notably, Mohr is the only person to have won a competitive Academy Award without being nominated for it. In 1936, a write-in campaign won him the Best Cinematography Oscar for his work on A Midsummer Night's Dream (1935), prompting an immediate rules-change by the Academy, making write-in voting impossible. In 1944, Mohr became the first person to win an Oscar for both Black-and-White and Color cinematography when he won his second Academy Award, this time with W. Howard Greene for Best Cinematography in a Color Film, for their work on The Phantom of the Opera (1943).

Mohr was nominated for an Academy Award for Best Cinematographer for his work on The Four Poster (1952), a film based on a play of the same name, written by Jan de Hartog. He was also nominated for a Golden Globe for Best Cinematography in a Black and White Film, for his work on the same movie.

Mohr served three times as president of the American Society of Cinematographers: from 1930 to 1931; then two consecutive terms, from 1963 to 1965; and, finally, from 1968 to 1969. He was one of the first members of the Academy of Motion Picture Arts and Sciences, as well as a senior member of its Board of Directors and the head of its Cinematography Branch for over 20 years. He was also a part of the Academy of Television Arts and Sciences. Before his death, Mohr would travel the country promoting cameramen and the industry of cinematography.

== Personal life and death ==
The first two of Mohr's three marriages ended in divorce. First, from 1919 to 1925, was Aileen Gosher (née Gocher, aka Jescher), with whom Mohr had three children, a son, Michael, and two daughters, Aileen and Joan. The second Mrs. Mohr was actress Claire Del Mar, married in 1926 and divorced three years later.

On December 7, 1934, Mohr married actress Evelyn Venable, whom he had met on the set of the Will Rogers film David Harum. Strict vegetarians, (Note: Venable herself was a lifelong vegetarian who, as of June 1935, was reportedly in the process of converting her husband, and who, as of August 1936, had, by her own account, succeeded.) they had two daughters, Dolores and Rosalia.

Following a brief illness, Mohr died on May 10, 1974 at St. John's Hospital in Santa Monica, survived by his wife and all five children.

== Legacy ==
On Wednesday, May 26, 1976, for his many contributions to motion pictures and the film industry, Mohr received a star on the Hollywood Walk of Fame, in front of the Hollywood Pacific Theatre at 6433 Hollywood Blvd.

== Awards and nominations ==
- American Academy Awards (Oscars), 1936, Best Cinematography – A Midsummer Night's Dream (1935)
- American Academy Awards (Oscars), 1944, Best Cinematography – The Phantom of the Opera (1943)
- Bronze Medallion, Academy of Television Arts and Sciences (1957)
- Billy Bitzer Award, International Photographers of the Motion Picture Industries (1957)
- George Eastman Award, George Eastman House (1957)

== Partial filmography ==
- Bag and Baggage (1923)
- Vanity's Price (1924)
- The Monster (1925)
- Little Annie Rooney (1925)
- He Who Laughs Last (1925)
- Sparrows (1926)
- The High Hand (1926)
- Bitter Apples (1927)
- Old San Francisco (1927)
- The Jazz Singer (1927)
- The Girl from Chicago (1927)
- Tenderloin (1928)
- The Wedding March (1928)
- Broadway (1929)
- The Last Performance (1929)
- Captain of the Guard (1930)
- The Czar of Broadway (1930)
- Big Boy (1930)
- Outward Bound (1930)
- The Cat Creeps (1930)
- A Woman of Experience (1931)
- The Common Law (1931)
- The Big Gamble (1931)
- Devotion (1931)
- The Week Ends Only (1932)
- I Loved You Wednesday (1933)
- State Fair (1933)
- David Harum (1934)
- Carolina (1934)
- Under Pressure (1935)
- A Midsummer Night's Dream (1935)
- Captain Blood (1935)
- The Walking Dead (1936)
- Bullets or Ballots (1936)
- When Love Is Young (1937)
- The Green Pastures (1937)
- Destry Rides Again (1939)
- The Daltons Rode (1940)
- Cheers for Miss Bishop (1941)
- Pot o' Gold (1941)
- Phantom of the Opera (1943)
- Ladies Courageous (1944)
- My Gal Loves Music (1944)
- San Diego, I Love You (1944)
- Because of Him (1946)
- The Lost Moment (1947)
- An Act of Murder (1948)
- Woman on the Run (1950)
- Rancho Notorious (1952)
- The Wild One (1953)
- Baby Faced Nelson (1957)
- The Lineup (1958)
- The Last Voyage (1959)
- Underworld U.S.A (1960)
- The Man from the Diners' Club (1963)
- The Bamboo Saucer (1968)
- Topaz (1969) (photographic consultant only)

== See also ==
- List of presidents of American Society of Cinematographers
- List of stars on the Hollywood Walk of Fame

== Bibliography ==
1. Petrie, Graham. "Paul Fejos in America." Film Quarterly (ARCHIVE), vol. 32, no. 2, 1979., pp. 28–37 ProQuest 223105967
2. "Hal Mohr, 'Jazz Singer' Cameraman." The Washington Post, 1974. ProQuest 146178942
3. "Hal Mohr, 79; Filmed First Talking Movie." Boston Globe, 1974. ProQuest 758647181
4. "A.S.C. MOURNS HAL MOHR." American Cinematographer, vol. 55, no. 6, 1974., pp. 680, ProQuest 196330148
5. Koszarski, Richard. "HAL MOHR'S CINEMATOGRAPHY." Film Comment, vol. 10, no. 5, 1974., pp. 48–53, ProQuest 210232414
6. Hal MOHR ProQuest 1745228691
7. "CAMERAMAN SAYS STAR IS SUPERB." The Washington Post, 1928. ProQuest 149895183
8. Streible, Dan. "Hal Mohr." American National Biography. N.p., n.d. Web. 17 Nov. 2016. http://www.anb.org/articles/18/18-02410.html
