= Ferocious Pal =

1934 film directed by Spencer Gordon Bennet

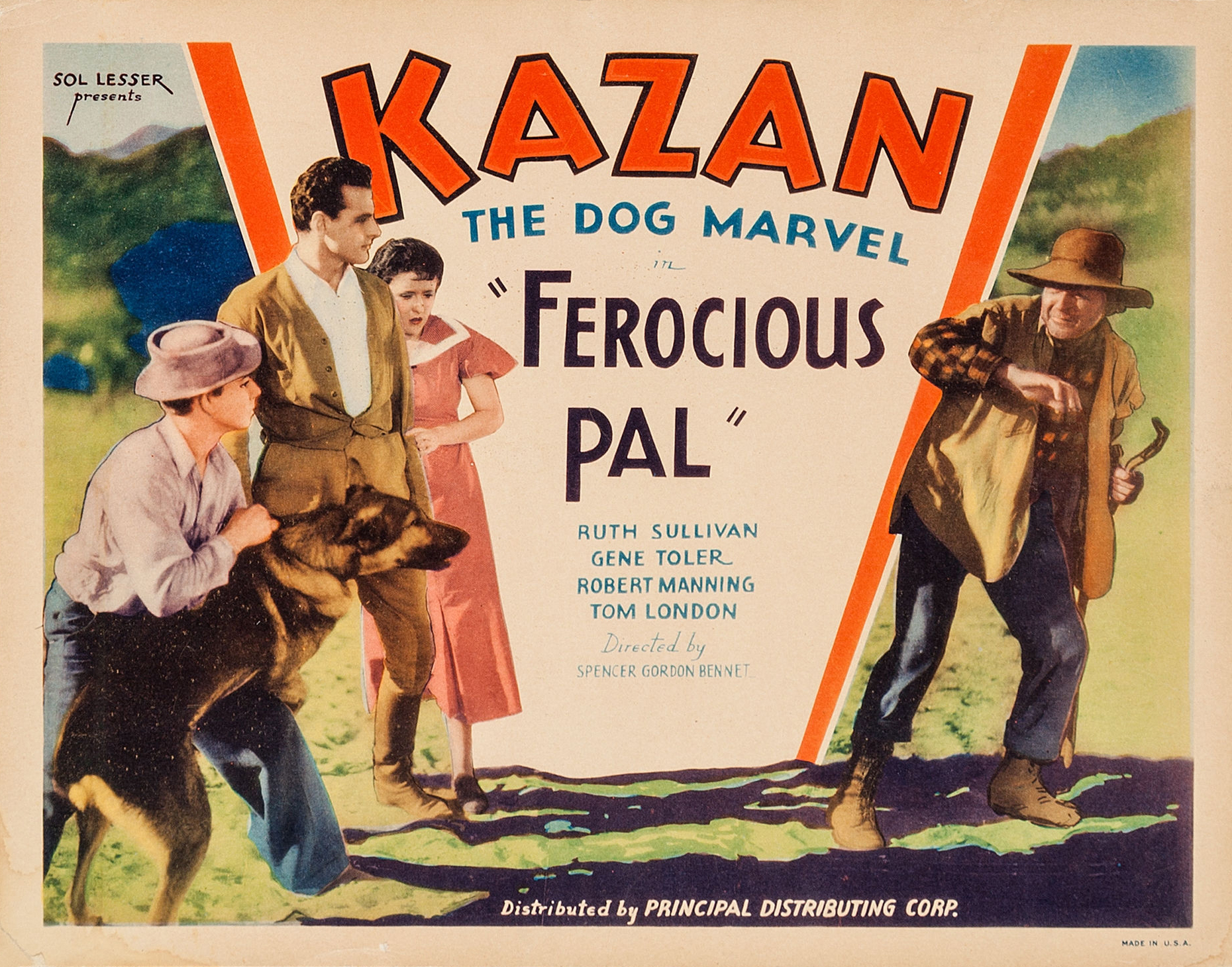
- Lobby card
- Directed by: Spencer Gordon Bennet
- Screenplay by: Joseph Anthony Roach
- Produced by: Sol Lesser
- Starring: Kazan the Wonder Dog; Ruth Sullivan; Gene Toler; Robert Seiter; Tom London; Harry Dunkinson
- Cinematography: Edward A. Kull
- Edited by: Carl Himm
- Production company: Sol Lesser Productions
- Distributed by: Principal Distributing
- Release date: February 2, 1934
- Running time: 55 minutes
- Country: United States
- Language: English

Ferocious Pal is a 1934 American adventure film directed by Spencer Gordon Bennet and written by Joseph Anthony Roach. The film stars Kazan the Wonder Dog, Ruth Sullivan, Gene Toler, Robert Seiter, Tom London and Harry Dunkinson. The film was released on February 2, 1934, by Principal Distributing.

== Cast ==
- Kazan the Wonder Dog as Kazan
- Ruth Sullivan as Patricia Boliver
- Gene Toler as Johnnie 'Digs' Diggin
- Robert Seiter as Dr. Tom Elliott
- Tom London as Dave Brownell
- Harry Dunkinson as Sheriff Dick Williams
- Henry Roquemore as Ebner Boliver
- Edward Cecil as Sykes
- Grace Wood as Martha Boliver
