= Make a Wish (1937 film) =

1937 American musical comedy film directed by Kurt Neumann

- Directed by: Kurt Neumann
- Written by: Bernard Schubert; Gertrude Berg; William Hurlbut; Al Boasberg; Earle Snell
- Produced by: Sol Lesser
- Starring: Bobby Breen; Basil Rathbone; Ralph Forbes
- Cinematography: John J. Mescall
- Edited by: Arthur Hilton
- Music by: Hugo Riesenfeld; Oscar Straus
- Production company: Principal Productions
- Distributed by: RKO Radio Pictures
- Release date: August 27, 1937
- Running time: 77 minutes
- Country: United States
- Language: English

Make a Wish is a 1937 American musical comedy film directed by Kurt Neumann and starring Bobby Breen, Basil Rathbone and Ralph Forbes.

== Plot ==
While at summer camp in the Maine woods, young Chip Winters (Breen) befriends British composer Johnathan Selden (Rathbone), who left the city high life to try to break his creative block, and is soon playing matchmaker for his widowed singer mother Irene Winters (Claire) and Selden.

== Cast ==
- Bobby Breen as Chip Winters
- Basil Rathbone Johnny Selden
- Marion Claire as Irene Winters
- Ralph Forbes as Walter Mays
- Donald Meek as Butler Joseph
- Billy Lee as Pee Wee
- Henry Armetta as Composer Moreta
- Leon Errol as Composer Brennan
- Herbert Rawlinson as Camp Manager Stevens
- Charles Richman as Mr. Wagner
- Fred Scott as Minstrel
- Lillian Harmer as Clara
- Johnny Arthur as Antoine
- Richard Tucker as Grant
- Leonid Kinskey as Moe
- Tommy Ryan as Chunky
- Barbara Barondess as Secretary
- Billy Lechner as Judge
- Lew Kelly as Mailman
- Dorothy Appleby as Telephone Girl

== Awards ==
Hugo Riesenfeld received a nomination for the Academy Award for best musical score for this film.
