= Bernard Schubert =

American screenwriter, playwright, television producer

- Born: January 1, 1895; Brooklyn, New York, United States
- Died: August 4, 1988 (aged 93); Los Angeles, California, United States
- Occupations: Producer and screenwriter
- Years active: 1931–1959

Bernard Schubert (January 1, 1895 – August 4, 1988) was an American screenwriter and television producer during the early sound era of film and early days of television.

A native New Yorker, Schubert attended the University of Pennsylvania for one year before he began working.

From 1931 through 1948 he was involved in the scripts for 25 films. Two of his more notable films were Peck's Bad Boy (1934), for which he co-wrote the screenplay with Marguerite Roberts, and which starred Jackie Cooper; and 1944's The Mummy's Curse, starring Lon Chaney Jr. In the late 1940s, he wrote several plays, two of which were turned into films. By the early 1950s, Schubert moved to the small screen, producing television series and movies during that decade. Some of the series he worked on were Mr. and Mrs. North, Topper, and Adventures of the Falcon.

Schubert died on August 4, 1988, in Los Angeles, California.

== Filmography ==
(as screenwriter - Per AFI database)

- Symphony of Six Million (1932)
- No Other Woman (1933)
- Straight Is the Way (1934)
- Peck's Bad Boy (1934)
- The Band Plays On (1934)
- Mark of the Vampire (1935)
- Kind Lady (1935)
- Hearts in Bondage (1936)
- The Barrier (1937)
- Make a Wish (1937)
- Breaking the Ice (1938)
- Fisherman's Wharf (1939)
- Scattergood Pulls the Strings (1941)
- Silver Queen (1942)
- Jungle Woman (1944)
- The Mummy's Curse (1945)
- The Frozen Ghost (1945)
