= Claire Del Mar =

American silent film actress

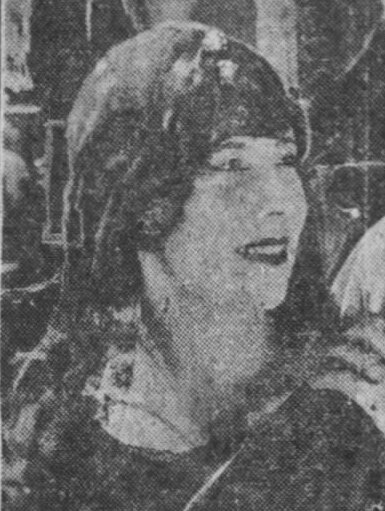
- Born: December 31, 1901; Kentucky
- Died: January 10, 1959 (aged 57); Carmel-by-the-Sea
- Occupation: Actor
- Spouse(s): Hal Mohr

Claire Del Mar (December 31, 1901 – January 10, 1959) was an American silent film actress. She was brutally murdered in 1959 in a case that remains unsolved.

Claire Del Mar was born Clara Eloise Loerch on December 31, 1901, in Kentucky. She appeared, often uncredited, in small roles in The Four Horsemen of the Apocalypse (1921), The Jazz Singer (1927), The Grain of Dust (1928), and The Wedding March (1928). She also starred with Al Jolson as Mary Dale in the 1936 Lux Radio Theatre adaptation of The Jazz Singer.

She married cinematographer Hal Mohr in a flashy 1926 wedding that featured Erich von Stroheim as best man held in a reproduction of St. Stephen's Cathedral, Vienna that was used as a set for The Wedding March. They divorced a few years later.

In 1959, she was living as Clara Eloise Mohr in Carmel, California, working as a practical nurse and living with and caring for her 80-year-old mother. Her neighbor Uvona Johnston found her body around noon on January 11, 1959; she had been stabbed repeatedly with a seven-inch steak knife. Her mother was unharmed and slept through the murder. Her son, Charles Swanner, later said that he had always suspected the murderer was Clara's brother, Karl Loerch, an optometrist prone to bouts of drunken violence, but Dr. Loerch was cleared by the initial investigation.

In 1991, Uvona Johnston's daughter Markliann Johnston told the Monterey County Sheriff's Department that she witnessed the murder at the age of two and recalled it thanks to recovered-memory therapy. Johnston said the murderers were the late Dr. Loerch and his widow, Mabele Marion Loerch. Sheriff's officers interviewed the 85-year-old woman in Sierra Vista, Arizona. The district attorney concluded there was "not enough credible evidence" to charge Loerch with murder.
