= Ian McLellan Hunter =

English screenwriter (1915–1991)

- Born: 8 August 1915; London, England
- Died: 5 March 1991 (aged 75); New York City, U.S.
- Occupations: Actor, screenwriter

Ian McLellan Hunter (8 August 1915 – 5 March 1991) was an English screenwriter, best remembered for fronting for the blacklisted Dalton Trumbo as the credited writer of Roman Holiday in 1953. Hunter was himself later blacklisted.

== Roman Holiday ==
Hunter agreed to front for Trumbo's screenplay for Roman Holiday, which both William Wyler and Paramount were very keen to make. When it was released to great acclaim and financial success, it was Hunter's name on the credits and it was he who picked up the Academy Award for Best Story. Academy members did not know they were honouring a blacklistee. Hunter paid Trumbo most of the salary he had earned for the film.

In the 1990s, the Academy sought to rectify some of the mistakes they had made during the Cold War and the Second Red Scare, reinstating Dalton Trumbo being one of them. Trumbo had died in 1976 but his widow was presented with an Oscar in 1993 for Roman Holiday. This was actually the second Oscar made for this category win as Hunter's son, Tim Hunter, a director in his own right, refused to hand over his father's Oscar.

== Other work ==
Hunter also fronted for Ring Lardner Jr., collaborating with him under the pseudonym Philip Rush. With Lardner, he co-wrote the book for the short-lived 1964 Broadway musical Foxy.

Hunter's work was not confined to fronting for others. He wrote the screenplays for over twenty films, including Footlight Fever (1941), The Amazing Mr. X (1948) and Mastermind (1976), as well as episodes of the television series The Defenders and the teleplay for the miniseries The Blue and the Gray (1982).

== Legacy ==
A dramatization of Trumbo's life, also called Trumbo, was released in November 2015. In it, Ian McLellan Hunter was portrayed by Alan Tudyk.

== Select credits ==
- Fisherman's Wharf (1939)
- Meet Dr. Christian (1939)
- Escape to Paradise (1940)
- The Courageous Dr. Christian (1940)
- Second Chorus (1940)
- Arkansas Judge (1941)
- Footlight Fever (1941)
- Slightly Dangerous (1943)
- Young Ideas (1943)
- Show Business (1944)
- Mr. District Attorney (1947)
- The Amazing Mr. X (1948)
- Your Witness (1950) (as Ian Hunter)
- A Woman of Distinction (1950)
- Beulah (1952) (TV series)
- Roman Holiday (1953)
- Sword of Freedom (1957) (TV series)
- The Adventures of Robin Hood (1958–60) (TV series)
- The Four Just Men (1959–60)- (TV series)
- Captain Sindbad (1963)
- The Defenders (1963) (TV series)
- Foxy (1964) (musical) – book
- The Reporter (1964) (TV series)
- Seaway (1965) (TV series) – various episodes, also script supervisor
- N.Y.P.D. (1967) (TV series)
- Monsieur Lecoq (1967) (abandoned)
- The Strange Case of Dr. Jekyll and Mr Hyde (1968)
- A Dream of Kings (1969)
- The Outside Man (1972)
- Mastermind (1976)
- You Can't Go Home Again (1979)
- Your Ticket Is No Longer Valid (1981)
- The Blue and the Gray (1982) (mini series)
