= Henry Armetta =

Italian-American actor (1888–1945)

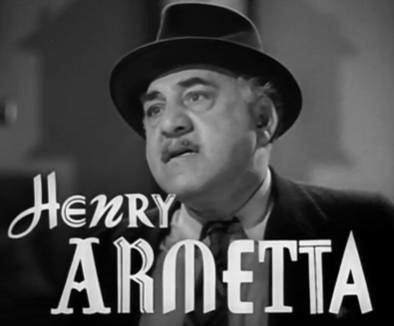
- Trailer for The Big Store (1941)
- Born: Enrico Armetta; July 4, 1888; Palermo, Sicily, Kingdom of Italy
- Died: October 21, 1945 (aged 57); San Diego, California, U.S.
- Resting place: Holy Cross Cemetery, Culver City
- Occupation: Actor
- Years active: 1915–1945; his death
- Spouse: Iole Armetta (1920–1945) (his death) (3 children)

Henry Armetta (born Enrico Armetta; July 4, 1888 – October 21, 1945) was an American character actor who appeared in at least 150 American films, beginning in silent movies. His last film was released posthumously in 1946, the year after his death.

== Biography ==
Armetta was born in Palermo, Sicily, Italy. At the age of 14, he stowed away on a boat to America. The immigration authorities were prepared to send him back, but he found an Italian family to act as his sponsor. He settled in New York City where he delivered groceries, sold sandwiches and pizzas and performed other menial tasks to get by. He eventually ended up working as a pants presser at a well known club where he was befriended by actor/producer Raymond Hitchcock. Hitchcock got him a chorus part in his play A Yankee Consul.

After a friend told him about southern California's mushrooming film industry, Armetta hitchhiked to Hollywood in 1920 and soon found work in films as a stereotypical Italian, often playing a barber, grocer or restaurant owner. He went on to appear in over 152 films (at least 24 films in 1934 alone), often uncredited. Armetta appeared in several films for Metro-Goldwyn-Mayer including Romance (1930) starring Greta Garbo, What! No Beer? (1933) with Buster Keaton and Jimmy Durante, Everybody Sing (1938) featuring Judy Garland, Allan Jones, and Fanny Brice, The Big Store (1941) opposite the Marx Brothers, and a much thinner Armetta was briefly glimpsed in one of his last appearances in the MGM Technicolor musical Anchors Aweigh (1945) with Frank Sinatra and Gene Kelly.

== Death ==
Armetta died in 1945 of a heart attack in San Diego, California, aged 57. He is buried at Holy Cross Cemetery in Culver City, California.

== Selected filmography ==
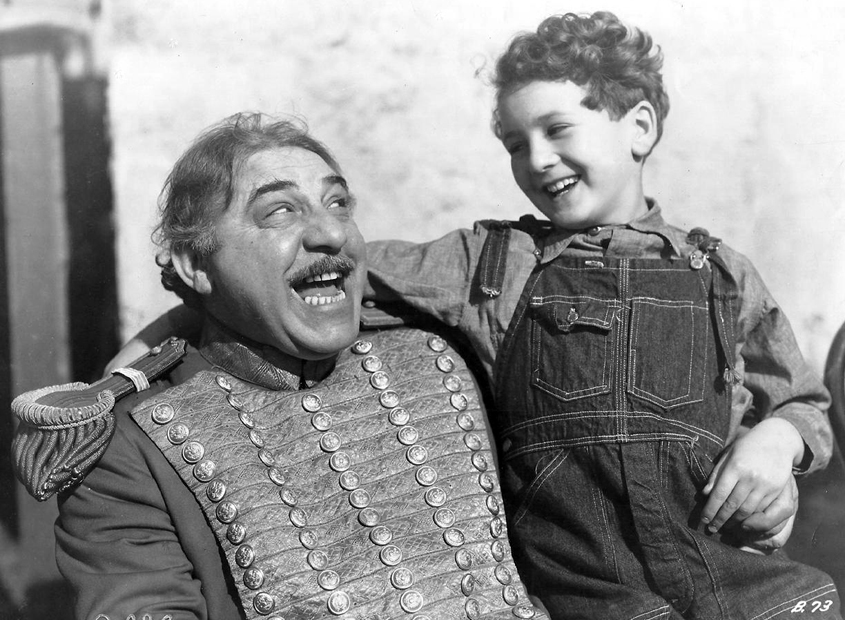
Henry Armetta with Bobby Breen in Let's Sing Again (1936)

- The Plunderer (1915) – Pedro
- The Marble Heart (1916)
- The Eternal Sin (1917) – The Jester
- The Jungle Trail (1919) – Grogas
- The Face at Your Window (1920) – Danglo
- Fantômas (1920, Serial) – The Wop
- The Silent Command (1923) – Pedro
- The Desert's Price (1925) – Shepherd
- The Missing Link (1927) – Organ Grinder
- 7th Heaven (1927) – Minor Role (uncredited)
- Paid to Love (1927) – Valet (uncredited)
- A Girl in Every Port (1928) – Bartender in Panama (uncredited)
- Street Angel (1928) – Masetto
- Lonesome (1928) – Ferris wheel guy (uncredited)
- The Red Dance (1928) – Prisoner (uncredited)
- Homesick (1928) – Bicycle Rider
- In Old Arizona (1928) – Barber (uncredited)
- Lady of the Pavements (1929) – Papa Pierre
- Madame X (1929) – Hotel Owner (uncredited)
- Half Marriage (1929) – Henry – Hot Dog Vendor (uncredited)
- Jazz Heaven (1929) – Tony
- Love, Live and Laugh (1929) – Tony
- The Trespasser (1929) – Barber (uncredited)
- Sunny Side Up (1929) – Italian Husband (uncredited)
- The Climax (1930) – Anton Donatelli
- The Ship from Shanghai (1930) – Sailor (uncredited)
- A Lady to Love (1930) – Angelo
- The Girl Said No (1930) – Grove Cafe Waiter (uncredited)
- Lovin' the Ladies (1930) – Signore Sagatelli
- Ladies Love Brutes (1930) – Tony, the Waiter (uncredited)
- Die Sehnsucht jeder Frau (1930) – Angelo
- The Sins of the Children (1930) – Tony the Barber
- The Little Accident (1930) – Rudolpho Amendelara
- Romance (1930) – Beppo
- Sei tu l'amore (1930) – The exporter
- La mujer X (1931) – Minor Role (uncredited)
- A Tailor Made Man (1931) – Peter, Tailor
- Strangers May Kiss (1931) – Waiter
- Laughing Sinners (1931) – Tony (uncredited)
- Just a Gigolo (1931) – Hotel Manager (uncredited)
- Five and Ten (1931) – Taxi Driver (uncredited)
- Hush Money (1931) – Bootlegger (uncredited)
- New Adventures of Get Rich Quick Wallingford (1931) – Henry – Barber (uncredited)
- The Unholy Garden (1931) – Nick the Goose
- Forbidden (1932) – Emile (uncredited)
- High Pressure (1932) – Italian Investor (uncredited)
- The Passionate Plumber (1932) – Bouncer
- Arsène Lupin (1932) – Sheriff's Man
- Steady Company (1932) – Tony Capri
- Scarface (1932) – Pietro – Barber (uncredited)
- Doomed Battalion (1932) – Angelo
- Huddle (1932) – Mr. Amatto
- Week Ends Only (1932) – Washroom Attendant
- Red-Headed Woman (1932) – Waiter Warning Bill of Lipstick (uncredited)
- Bachelor's Affairs (1932) – Tony – Cosmetician (uncredited)
- Speak Easily (1932) – Tony
- Okay, America! (1932) – Sam
- Hat Check Girl (1932) – Water Wagon Driver (uncredited)
- Deception (1932) – Nick
- Prosperity (1932) – Henry, a Barber
- Men of America (1932) – Tony Garboni
- Uptown New York (1932) – Nick – Restaurant Proprietor (uncredited)
- A Farewell to Arms (1932) – Bonello – Italian Ambulance Driver (uncredited)
- Central Park (1932) – Tony, Hot Dog Vendor (uncredited)
- They Just Had to Get Married (1932) – Tony
- Rasputin and the Empress (1932) – Photographer (uncredited)
- What! No Beer? (1933) – Tony
- The Cohens and Kellys in Trouble (1933) – Captain Silva
- So This Is Africa (1933) – Street Cleaner (uncredited)
- Fra Diavolo (1933) – Matteo
- Don't Bet on Love (1933) – Caparillo, Barber (uncredited)
- Laughing at Life (1933) – Fruit Vendor
- Her First Mate (1933) – Socrates
- Too Much Harmony (1933) – Mr. Gallotti
- Cross Country Cruise (1934) – The Italian
- The Poor Rich (1934) – Tony
- The Cat and the Fiddle (1934) – Taxi Driver
- Viva Villa! (1934) – Alfredo Mendosa
- The Black Cat (1934) – The Sergeant
- Half a Sinner (1934) – The Barber
- Let's Talk It Over (1934) – Tony
- Kiss and Make-Up (1934) – Banquet Chairman
- Romance in the Rain (1934) – Tulio
- Hide-Out (1934) – Shuman
- Gift of Gab (1934) – Janitor
- Embarrassing Moments (1934) – Morganza
- One Night of Love (1934) – Cafe Owner (uncredited)
- Wake Up and Dream (1934) – Giovanni Cellini
- Two Heads on a Pillow (1934) – Enrico Populopulini
- The Merry Widow (1934) – Turk (uncredited)
- Imitation of Life (1934) – The Painter
- Cheating Cheaters (1934) – Prof. Tony Verdi
- The Man Who Reclaimed His Head (1934) – Laurent
- After Office Hours (1935) – Italian Diner Owner
- Night Life of the Gods (1935) – Roigi
- I've Been Around (1935) – Italian
- Straight from the Heart (1935) – Ice Cream Man
- Princess O'Hara (1935) – Spidoni
- Dinky (1935) – Tony Karamazo – the Junkman
- Unknown Woman (1935) – Joe Scalise
- Manhattan Moon (1935) – Tony
- Three Kids and a Queen (1935) – Tony Orsatti
- Magnificent Obsession (1935) – Tony
- Let's Sing Again (1936) – Joe Pasquale
- Poor Little Rich Girl (1936) – Tony
- The Crime of Dr. Forbes (1936) – Luigi
- Two in a Crowd (1936) – Toscani
- The Magnificent Brute (1936) – Buzell
- Top of the Town (1937) – Bacciagalluppi
- Make a Wish (1937) – Moreta
- Manhattan Merry-Go-Round (1937) – Spadoni
- Everybody Sing (1938) – Signor Vittorino
- Speed to Burn (1938) – Papa Gambini
- Submarine Patrol (1938) – Luigi
- Road Demon (1938) – Papa Luigi Gambini
- Fisherman's Wharf (1939) – Beppo
- Winner Take All (1939) – Papa Luigi Gambini
- The Lady and the Mob (1939) – Zambrogio
- I Stole a Million (1939) – Nick
- Dust Be My Destiny (1939) – Nick
- Rio (1939) – Headwaiter (uncredited)
- The Escape (1939) – Guiseppi Peronni
- Boss Foreman (1939)
- Three Cheers for the Irish (1940) – Tony
- The Man Who Talked Too Much (1940) – Tony Spirella
- You're Not So Tough (1940) – Salvatore
- We Who Are Young (1940) – Tony
- Caught in the Act (1941) – Mike Ripportella
- The Big Store (1941) – Guiseppi
- Slick Chick (1941)
- Stage Door Canteen (1943) – Himself
- Good Luck, Mr. Yates (1943) – Mike Zaloris
- Thank Your Lucky Stars (1943) – Angelo the Barber (uncredited)
- Once Upon a Time (1944) – Barber (uncredited)
- Ghost Catchers (1944) – Signatelli (uncredited)
- Allergic to Love (1944) – Louie
- A Bell for Adano (1945) – Errante – Cart Man
- Penthouse Rhythm (1945) – Cafe Owner Joe
- Anchors Aweigh (1945) – Hamburger Man
- Colonel Effingham's Raid (1946) – Jimmy Economy (final film role)
