= Cecilia Viets Jamison =

Cecilia Viets Jamison (1837 – April 11, 1909) was a British North American-born American writer.

The daughter of Viets and Elizabeth Bruce Dakin, she was born Cecilia Viets Dakin in Yarmouth, Nova Scotia and moved to Boston with her family during her mid-teens. She studied at private schools in Canada, New York City, Boston and Paris. Following her first marriage, Jamison went on to study art in Rome for three years. There, she met Henry Wadsworth Longfellow, who encouraged her in her writing and supported the publication of her book Woven of Many Threads in 1872. On her return to the United States, she participated in the literary salon of Mollie Evelyn Moore Davis. Jamison contributed to Harper's Magazine, Scribner's Magazine, Appletons' Journal, St. Nicholas Magazine and the Journal of American Folklore.

Her earliest writings such as Something to Do: A Novel (1871) and A Crown from the Spear (1872) were mainly set in Europe and targeted at an adult audience. In 1891, she began writing for young audiences with Lady Jane; set in New Orleans, it was translated into French, Italian, German and Norwegian.

She was married twice: first to George Hamilton around 1860 and then to Samuel Jamison, a lawyer from New Orleans, in 1878. The couple lived near Thibodaux, Louisiana, moving to New Orleans in 1887.

After her second husband's death in 1902, she returned to Massachusetts. She died in Roxbury seven years later from heart disease.

== Selected works ==
- Woven of Many Threads (1871)
- Something to Do: A Novel (1871)
- A Crown from the Spear (1872)
- My Bonnie Lass (1877)
- The Story of an Enthusiast: Told by Himself (1888)
- Lady Jane (1891)
- Toinette's Phillip (1894)
- Seraph, the Little Violiniste (1896)
- Thistledown (1903)
- The Penhallow Family (1905)
