= The Big Gamble (1931 film) =

1931 film

- Theatrical release poster
- Directed by: Fred Niblo; E. J. Babille (assistant)
- Screenplay by: Walter DeLeon; F. McGrew Willis
- Based on: The Iron Chalice; 1925 novel by Octavus Roy Cohen
- Produced by: Charles R. Rogers
- Starring: William Boyd; Dorothy Sebastian; Warner Oland; James Gleason
- Cinematography: Hal Mohr
- Edited by: Joseph Kane
- Music by: Arthur Lange
- Production company: RKO Pictures
- Distributed by: RKO Pictures
- Release date: September 4, 1931
- Running time: 65 minutes
- Country: United States
- Language: English

The Big Gamble is a 1931 American pre-Code drama film directed by Fred Niblo and written by Walter DeLeon and F. McGrew Willis. The film stars William Boyd, Dorothy Sebastian, Warner Oland and James Gleason. The film was released on September 4, 1931 by RKO Pictures.

== Plot ==
When Alan Beckwith hits rock bottom, he approaches a local Mob boss named North to help him get his affairs in order before he kills himself. If North will stake him for what he owes, he will name him as the beneficiary of a life insurance policy which North can collect on after he commits suicide.

North initially rejects the offer, pointing out that a life insurance policy would have a clause in it about suicide, preventing it from paying out before a year and a day, but he later accepts under his own conditions. First, that the price of the policy be raised to $100,000. Second, that Alan live for precisely one year and one day to satisfy the conditions of the policy, and Third, that he marry a woman named Beverly who would then collect on his life insurance policy as a proxy for the payments, and ensure that he doesn't skip town. Alan, having no other options, accepts, and he and Beverly are immediately wed.

While Alan is forced to marry for money, Beverly does it to protect her brother, who is also in debt to North, and will be paying back *his* debt with the money she earns from this job "babysitting" Alan. Her brother Johnny initially doesn't understand why his sister married a complete stranger, and gets upset when he discovers she has done it to save him.

As time goes by, Alan and Beverly grow fond of each other, and after 6 months they endeavor to work as hard as possible to raise enough money to buy out North so that Alan will not have to die. Amazingly, by December 30th Alan has raised enough money to not only pay North back what he has spent, but to also give him an additional $5,000, however, North refuses the buyout unless Alan can produce the $100,000 that he is worth to him dead.

Dejected, Alan returns home and delivers the bad news, which sends Johnny out after North, determined to kill him to save Alan. Johnny is captured, and Alan is too when he arrives to stop him, but after Johnny is taken into a car to "go for a ride", Alan manages to turn the tables on North by grabbing his gun, and they get into a car to pursue Johnny.

What follows is a car chase down side streets and across train tracks. In the chase, North attempts to get his gun back and falls out of the car in the process, dying. In the end, there is a terrible crash, but Johnny is pulled from the wreckage and makes a recovery while Alan and Beverly embrace their future together.

== Cast ==
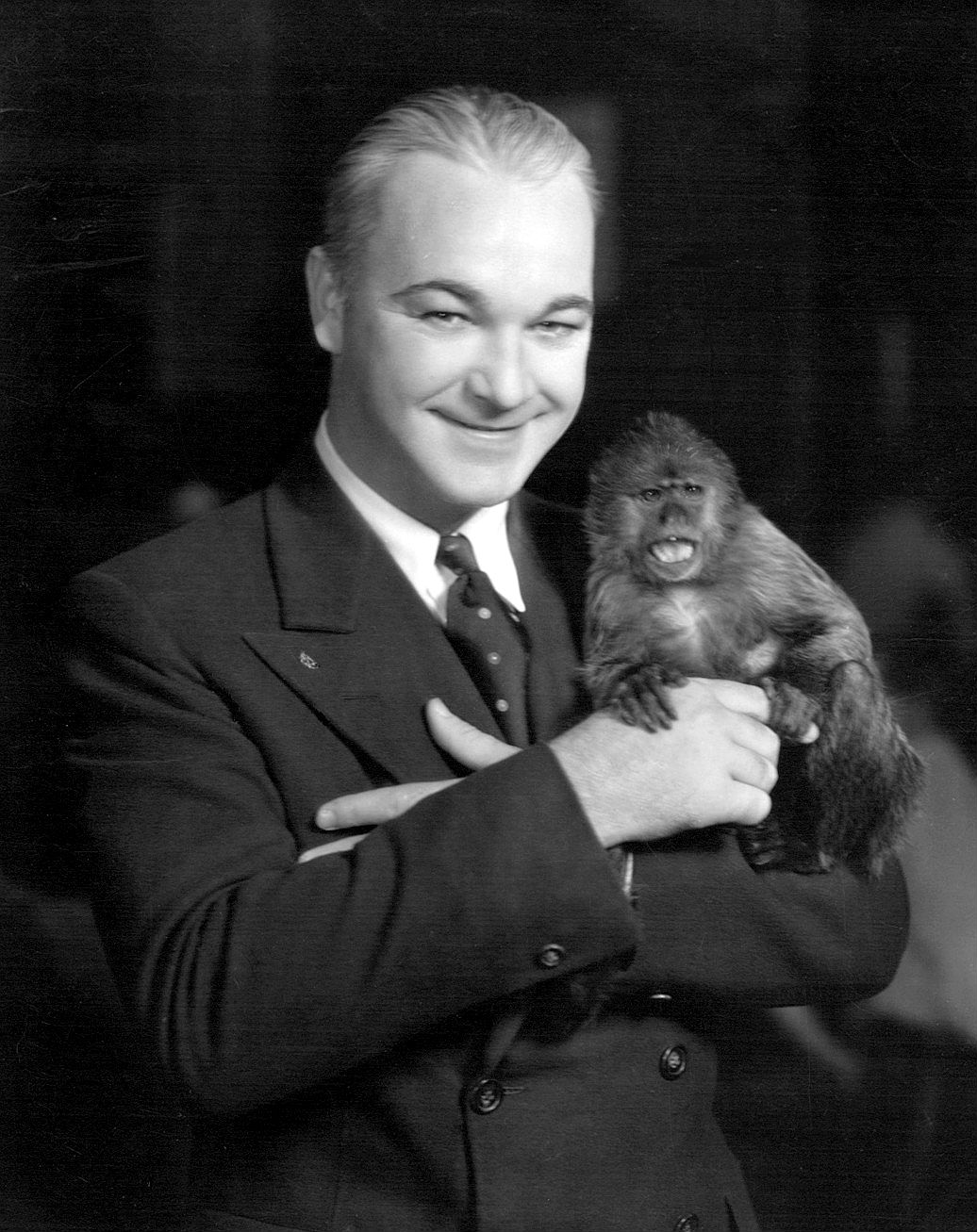
While filming The Big Gamble, William Boyd was visited on the set by Josephine, an animal actor who performed with him four years before in The Yankee Clipper (1927).

- Bill Boyd as Alan Beckwith
- James Gleason as Squint
- Warner Oland as North
- Dorothy Sebastian as Beverly
- ZaSu Pitts as Nora
- June MacCloy as Mae
- William Collier Jr. as Johnnie
- Ralph Ince as Webb
- Geneva Mitchell as Trixie
- Fred Walton as Butler
- Jack Richardson as Gambler

(Cast list per American Film Institute database.)
