= Escape to Paradise =

1939 film by Erle C. Kenton

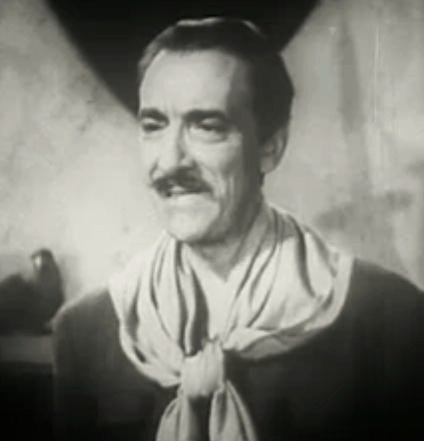
- Pedro de Cordoba in the film
- Directed by: Erle C. Kenton
- Written by: Ian McLellan Hunter (story); Herbert Clyde Lewis (story); Weldon Melick (writer)
- Produced by: Barney Briskin (associate producer)
- Starring: See below
- Cinematography: Charles Edgar Schoenbaum
- Edited by: Arthur Hilton
- Music by: Victor Young
- Distributed by: RKO Pictures
- Release date: December 22, 1939
- Running time: 60 minutes
- Country: United States
- Language: English

Escape to Paradise is a 1939 American musical film directed by Erle C. Kenton.

== Plot ==
Jaded playboy Richard Fleming travels to the South American nation of Rosarita. Through his motorcycle riding guide Roberto he discovers true love and a career as a Yerba mate exporter.

== Cast ==
- Bobby Breen as Roberto Ramos
- Kent Taylor as Richard Fleming
- Marla Shelton as Juanita
- Rudolph Anders as Alexander Komac
- Joyce Compton as Penelope Carter
- Pedro de Cordoba as Don Miguel
- Rosina Galli as Brigida, the Dueña
- Anna Demetrio as Señora Ramos, Roberto's Mother
- Francisco Marán as Perez
- Carlos Villarías as Gonzales
- Frank Yaconelli as Manuel, the Taxi Driver

== Soundtrack ==
- "Tra-La-La" (Music by Nilo Menendez, lyrics by Eddie Cherkose)
- "Rhythm of the Rio" (Music by Nilo Menendez. Lyrics by Eddie Cherkose)
