= Bobby Breen =

Canadian-American actor and singer (1925–2016)

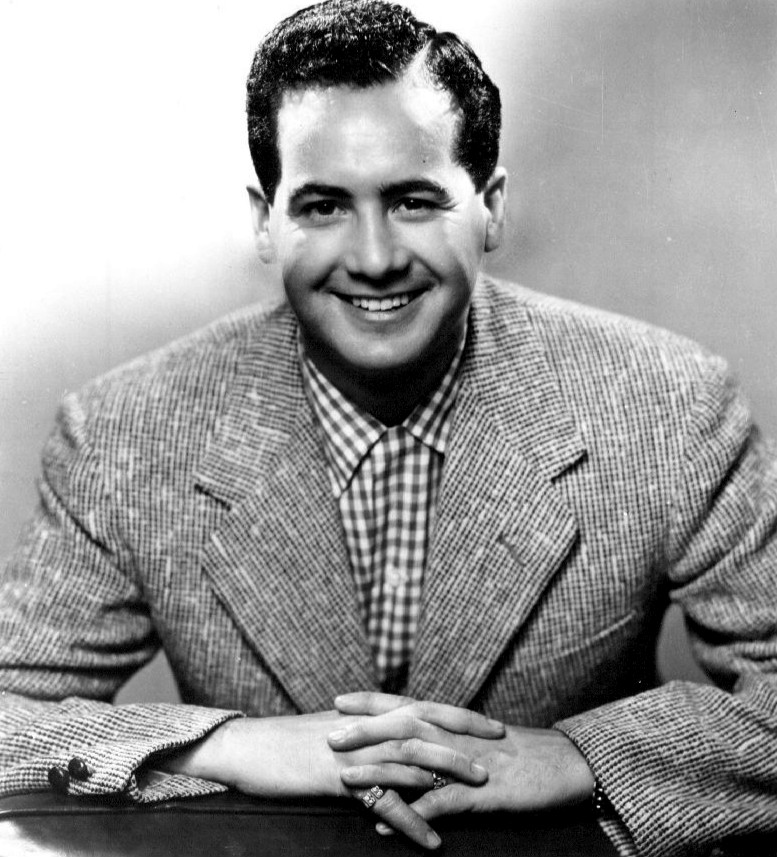
- Born: Isadore Borsuk; November 4, 1925; Montreal, Quebec, Canada
- Died: September 19, 2016 (aged 90); Pompano Beach, Florida, U.S.
- Occupations: Actor; singer
- Years active: 1936–2016
- Spouses: Jocelyn Lesh (m. 1952; div. 1961) Audrey Howard (m. 1962–2016)
- Children: 1

Bobby Breen (born Isadore Borsuk; November 4, 1925 – September 19, 2016) was a Canadian-born American actor and singer. He was a popular male child singer during the 1930s and reached major popularity with film and radio appearances.

== Early life ==
Breen was born Isadore Borsuk in Montréal, Canada, on November 4, 1925 (although some sources have claimed 1927 or 1928). He was the son of Hyman (Chaim) and Rebecca Borsuk; his parents were poor Jewish immigrants from Ukraine. They, along with Breen's three older siblings (Gertrude, Sally, and Michael), migrated from Kyiv to Montreal, Quebec, Canada, in 1927. Soon after, they relocated to Toronto. His singing talent as a boy soprano was discovered at the age of three by his sister Sally, herself an aspiring musical student who was several years his senior. While their parents did not show any particular interest, Sally decided to help him achieve stardom.

With the assistance from her music teacher, Breen got a chance to perform in front of an audience in a nightclub. Soon, he began winning prizes in theatre competitions, providing significant amount of income to the poor family, and the two siblings decided to look for work and recognition in the United States. Financed by Sally, they traveled to Chicago by bus in 1934, where he began working with people such as Gloria Swanson and Milton Berle in local theater productions. Breen later relocated to New York City. The foreign-sounding last name of Borsuk had been Anglicised to Breen (more Gaelicised, as it is an Irish surname) prior to their arrival in the United States.

== Child star at RKO ==
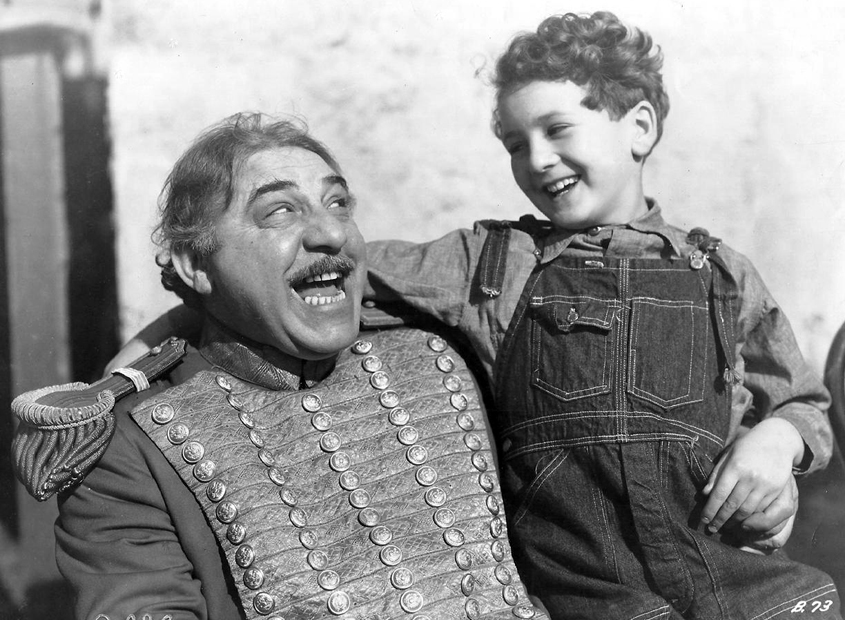
Bobby Breen and Henry Armetta in Let's Sing Again (1936)

Breen went to Hollywood in 1935, where he received singing lessons from a vocal coach. Film producer Sol Lesser, who had discovered Jackie Coogan, signed Breen to RKO Radio Pictures. Around this time, he became a regular performer on Eddie Cantor's weekly CBS radio show, Texaco Town, in 1936, where his talents as a boy soprano were appreciated by the listeners. Prior to the release of his first motion picture, Let's Sing Again, he was compared to other child stars of the era such as Freddie Bartholomew and Shirley Temple. In terms of his vocalist abilities, he was described as a combination of Allan Jones, Nelson Eddy and Al Jolson. His debut saw him being top-billed with Henry Armetta as his co-star. He sang "La donna è mobile", among other songs, in the movie.

He also signed a contract with Decca Records and had moderate success with a series of 78 rpm records in the late 1930s. The title song from Let's Sing Again (Decca 798) would become a success in the summer of 1936.

Satisfied with his debut for the studio, RKO signed a deal with him for three additional movies. He was cast in another musical later the same year called Rainbow on the River, co-starring May Robson and Alan Mowbray. He sang Ave Maria and the film's title song Rainbow on the River. Kurt Neumann, who had directed Breen in his first two pictures, worked with him for the last time in Make a Wish in 1937. His co-star was Basil Rathbone. In a 1938 article, he was referred to as one of the rare cases of child actors succeeding in an adult-dominated industry.

By the time he had completed filming Escape to Paradise in 1939, his voice was gradually changing due to puberty. As a result, he retired from the film industry, despite being originally contracted for two additional movies, and instead focused on his education at Beverly Hills High School. He described the sudden voice change in a 1977 article:

When you've been a child star and suddenly find yourself with a husky voice, it's hard to convince agents that you're not over the hill. I stopped singing at 16 because of the huskiness and took up the piano. I had the knack for it, but never wanted to be a concert pianist. I just wanted to be back in the world I'd known all my life.

His popularity did not immediately wane during his hiatus, receiving mail from numerous fans across the United States and United Kingdom. He briefly returned to the screen in 1942 to appear as himself in Johnny Doughboy, starring Jane Withers. As an adult, he expressed skepticism about children working in the entertainment industry.

== In the military ==
Breen enlisted in the infantry in the U.S. Army during World War II. He and fellow Hollywood actor Mickey Rooney were soon assigned to entertain the troops, despite him having retired from show business. Breen was hospitalized in France in 1945 towards the end of the war. For his war efforts, he was awarded the Bronze Star Medal.

== Adult years ==
After his discharge from the U.S. Army, in 1946, he initially struggled to find work as he returned to show business. He did some theatre work as well as some radio appearances in New York during this period. Because of his voice having changed since becoming an adult, he took singing lessons to reinvent himself by adapting to a new tenor singing style.

Throughout the 1950s and 1960s, he worked as a singer in nightclubs and as a musical performer in stock theatre, later serving as a guest pianist for the NBC Symphony Orchestra on radio, and hosting a local TV show in New York. He also recorded briefly for the Motown label, singing on two singles ("How Can We Tell Him" b/w "Better Late Than Never" and "You're Just Like You" b/w "Here Comes That Heartache"), and produced an unreleased album in 1964, called Better Late Than Never. Berry Gordy had hoped for Breen to become his first white contracted artist, but ultimately changed his mind because the singer did not suit the type of music Motown produced. In 1953, Breen appeared on ABC's reality show, The Comeback Story, to explain how his career nose-dived as he entered his teen years and how he fought to recover.

Since the 1970s, he and his wife Audrey had been working in Florida as entrepreneurs, booking agents and producers arranging musical shows performed by various entertainers at smaller, affordable venues. The business idea is called a "condominium circuit". In later years, it has focused on hiring aged stars of the past, including Debbie Reynolds, Mickey Rooney and Ann Blyth.

== Personal life ==
In November 1948, he went missing while on a private flight from Waukesha, Wisconsin, to Hayward, Wisconsin. Several planes went searching for him for a day and a half before it was discovered that he had been staying at a hotel anonymously without telling anyone. He was fined 300 U.S. dollars.

Breen married fashion model Jocelyn Lesh on November 9, 1952. The couple had a son, Hunter Keith Breen, in 1954. Four years later, the marriage became unsustainable, with Jocelyn claiming that he had physically injured her. They went their separate ways, but the divorce was not finalized until February 1961. He married the president of the City of Hope National Medical Center, Audrey Howard (known legally as Audrey Horwitz), in New York in 1962.

He lived with his family in Tamarac, Florida, and worked as the owner/operator of Bobby Breen Enterprises, a local talent agency. Starting in 2002, he made occasional concert appearances.

His sister Sally died in 1999. That same year, he underwent bypass surgery due to blocked arteries in his heart.

== Death ==
He died of natural causes in Pompano Beach, Florida, on September 19, 2016, three days following the death of his wife.

== Awards ==
On February 12, 2012, he was the recipient of the "Forest Trace Honorary Octogenarian: Turn Back Time" award.

== Filmography ==
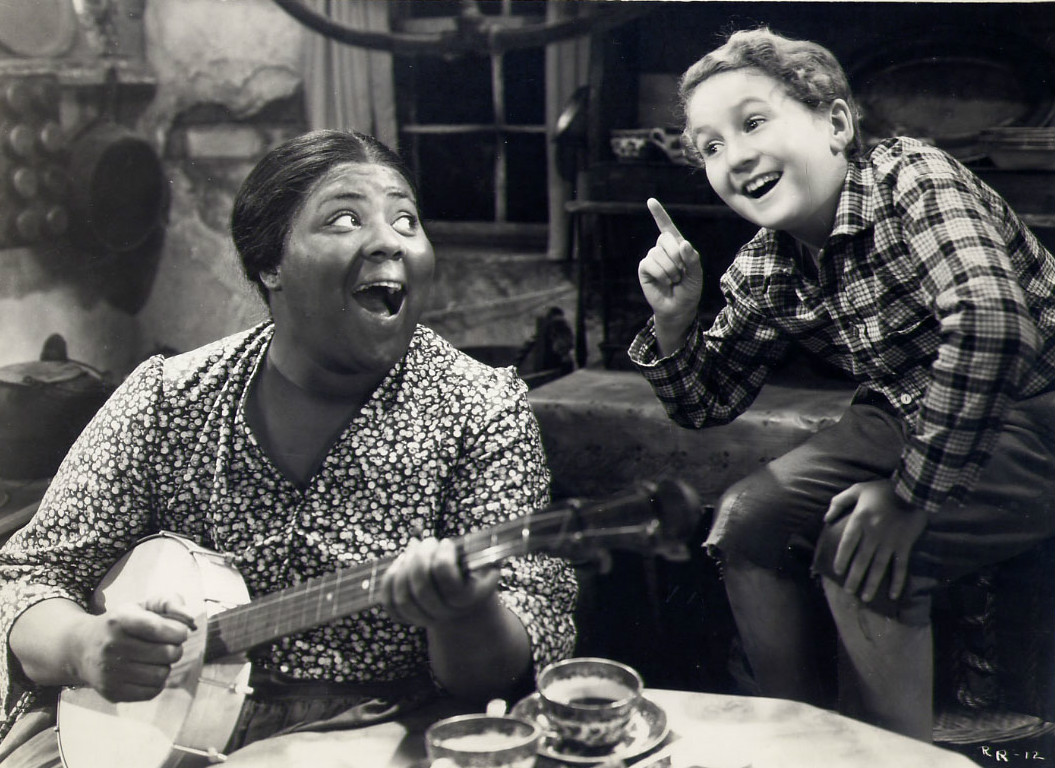
With Louise Beavers in Rainbow on the River (1936)

Year	Title	Role
1936	Let's Sing Again	Billy Gordon
1936	Rainbow on the River	Philip Ainsworth
1937	Make a Wish	Chip Winters
1938	Hawaii Calls	Billy Coulter
1938	Breaking the Ice	Tommy Martin
1939	Fisherman's Wharf	Tony Roma
1939	Way Down South	Timothy Reid Jr
1939	Escape to Paradise	Roberto Ramos
1942	Johnny Doughboy	Himself

== In popular culture ==
Breen was one of the people represented on the cover of The Beatles' album Sgt. Pepper's Lonely Hearts Club Band. He found his inclusion on the album cover surprising.

Lenny Bruce mentioned Breen in his comedy routine "The Palladium".
