= The Many Loves of Dobie Gillis season 1 =

The Many Loves of Dobie Gillis
- Season 1
- No. of episodes: 39

Release
- Original network: CBS
- Original release: September 29, 1959 – July 5, 1960

Season chronology
- Next → Season 2

This is a list of episodes from the first season of The Many Loves of Dobie Gillis. This season of the series explores Dobie Gillis' life as a junior at Central High School, and is the only season of the series to feature Tuesday Weld and Warren Beatty among the cast.

== Broadcast history ==
The season originally aired Tuesdays at 8:30-9:00 pm (EST) on CBS from September 29, 1959, to July 5, 1960.

== Nielsen ratings ==
The season was not ranked in the Top 30 shows.

== DVD release ==
The Region 1 DVD of the entire series was released on July 2, 2013. A Season One standalone set was released on September 10 of that year.

== Cast ==
=== Main ===
- Dwayne Hickman as Dobie Gillis
- Frank Faylen as Herbert T. Gillis (32 episodes)
- Florida Friebus as Winifred "Winnie" Gillis (32 episodes)
- Bob Denver as Maynard G. Krebs (34 episodes)
- Michael J. Pollard as Jerome Krebs (2 episodes)

=== Recurring ===
- Tuesday Weld as Thalia Menninger (14 episodes)
- Warren Beatty as Milton Armitage (5 episodes)
- Darryl Hickman as Davey Gillis (3 episodes)
- Sheila James as Zelda Gilroy (4 episodes)
- Steve Franken as Chatsworth Osborne, Jr. (7 episodes)
- William Schallert as Mr. Leander Pomfritt (4 episodes)
- Herbert Anderson as Mr. Leander Pomfritt (1 episode)
- Jean Byron as Mrs. Ruth Adams (3 episodes)
- Doris Packer as Mrs. Armitage/Mrs. Chatsworth Osbourne, Sr. (5 episodes)
- Marjorie Bennett as Mrs. Blossom Kenney (6 episodes)
- Tommy Farrell as Riff Ryan (3 episodes)

== Episodes ==
No. overall	No. in season	Title	Directed by	Written by	Original release date	Prod. code
1	1	"Caper at The Bijou"	Rod Amateau	Max Shulman	September 29, 1959	3301/3401
17-year-old Dobie Gillis would love to find the right girl for himself. But to do that, he needs money. Dobie wants to go to the $100 jackpot night at the Bijou movie theater and asks his father for some money. His father, Herbert T. Gillis, wants Dobie to earn money by working at the family grocery store. Dobie's mother, Winnie, would rather Dobie experience life and slips him some money. At school, Dobie tells his beatnik friend Maynard G. Krebs that he's going to Jackpot night. That night at the Bijou, Dobie meets pretty Thalia Menninger. Despite him pestering her, she asks him to go partners on the Jackpot drawing. The Theater Manager (Jason Wingreen) has Maynard pull a number and someone else wins. Dobie follows Thalia to the malt shop. She seems to like Dobie, but is upfront that she will only date guys who have money. Dobie talks Thalia into going to the Junior Prom with him. Dobie and Maynard come up with a way to rig the next Jackpot drawing so that Dobie wins. At the Bijou, something that Dobie sees in the movie makes him have a change of heart about cheating to win the Jackpot. Dobie's number is called but he doesn't go up and another number is called. Maynard then shows up and Dobie realizes that his number was called fair and square. Stanley Adams as Morelli. Dick Wessel as Aphrodite. Bart Patton as Bart. Note: Herbert Anderson plays Mr. Pomfritt in this pilot episode. The original pre-CBS version of the pilot includes a five-minute appeal from Dobie and the cast (including a bit part by Yvonne Craig) in character asking for a sponsor/network pickup, and does not include the tag seen in the final broadcast print.
2	2	"The Best Dressed Man"	Rod Amateau	Max Shulman	October 6, 1959	3403
Dobie is in love with Thalia, but she keeps making eyes at wealthy, better-dressed Milton Armitage. Thalia just goes wild when Milton talks about all the clothes he has. Dobie asks his father for new fancy clothes, but Herbert refuses. Mr. Ziegler (Mel Blanc), the owner of a men's clothing store, complains that he's not selling any clothes to high school kids. Dobie talks Mr. Ziegler into letting him secretly model the store's best outfits to help promote the store's business. The next day, Dobie walks into class in a brand new suit. Despite already having a date with Milton, Thalia asks Dobie to meet her at the malt shop. For days Dobie and Milton try to outdress each other. Milton finally gives Thalia an ultimatum, but she says she'll have to see what Dobie is wearing. Dobie's outfit wows Thaila and she asks him to be her steady. Milton finds out that Dobie was getting the suits from Ziegler and tells Thalia. She doesn't mind because it shows that Dobie has initiative and he may be rich when she's ready to get married. She tells Dobie he should get paid for advertising Ziegler's clothes, but Ziegler says no. Thalia is once again done with Dobie. Note: First appearance of Warren Beatty as Milton and William Schallert as Mr. Pomfritt. In 1997, TV Guide ranked this episode #64 on its list of the 100 Greatest Episodes.
3	3	"Love Is a Science"	Rod Amateau	Max Shulman	October 13, 1959	3406
Dobie writes a poem for Thalia. She is not impressed and says that poets make no money. Thalia wants Dobie to become a wealthy doctor. Dobie says he's no good at science but he'll try. Dobie has been taking a zoology class for a month now and is not doing well. Dobie's brainy lab partner, Zelda Gilroy, says three surprising first words to him: "I love you". Zelda believes they are meant to be together. Dobie fails his latest zoology test. Lovesick Zelda agrees to help with Dobie's homework every night. Dobie lies and says he has a job at night. Zelda will still do his homework. Dobie feels guilty using Zelda that way, but he's doing it for Thalia. Zelda finds out about Thalia, but still wants Dobie. Dobie quits the zoology class. Zelda falls for another boy in class. Charles Lane as Zoology Teacher. Note: Based on Shulman's original short story of the same title. First appearance of Sheila James as Zelda. Bob Denver does not appear in this episode.
4	4	"The Right Triangle"	Rod Amateau	Ben Starr	October 20, 1959	3415
Herbert learns that his son Dobie tried to get a loan at the bank using his store as collateral. Dobie is in love with a girl and he doesn't even know her name. Dobie's older brother, Davey, is home on break from college. Davey tells Dobie that to get the girl interested in him, he should pretend he's in a relationship with an older married woman. Dobie learns that the girl's name is Felicia Gray (Yvonne Lime). He tells her about his doomed love affair with "Mrs. X" and how she takes his money. Felicia wants to hear more. Later, Felicia sees Dobie with Mrs. Ruth Adams (Jean Byron), the substitute math teacher, and assumes she is Mrs. X. Dobie feels bad that Felicia keeps spending her money on him. It is not long before everyone in class knows about Dobie and Ruth. Dobie goes along with it because it means more attention from Felicia. Felicia gets jealous when Mrs. Adams makes Dobie stay after school with her to go over his math. Felicia tells Herbert about Dobie and Mrs. Adams. She also mentions all the money she's been spending on him. Herbert confronts Ruth. He thinks he's talking Ruth into dumping Dobie and she thinks she's talking Herbert into paying more attention to his son. Note: First appearance of Darryl Hickman as Dobie's brother, Davey Gillis.
5	5	"Maynard's Farewell to the Troops"	Rod Amateau	Max Shulman & Rod Amateau	November 3, 1959	3405
Maynard forgets to give Thalia a note from Dobie. Despite Maynard being his best friend, Dobie is just very frustrated with him. Dobie tells Maynard that he just needs some time away from him. Maynard's other friends, Riff Ryan (Tommy Farrell) at the record store and Charlie Wong at the ice cream parlor, start to feel the same way. Maynard goes home and finds his father (Willis Bouchey) upset with him for the large phone bill he created. Mr. Krebs tells Maynard he just needs some time away from him. Maynard feels rejected by his friends and family. Maynard tells Dobie he received his draft notice and maybe it is for the best. In class, Mr. Pomfritt notices that Dobie seems depressed. Everyone is surprised when Dobie says that Maynard has been drafted. Maynard feels good when they all say he'll be missed. Mr. Pomfritt and Dobie host a testimonial farewell dinner for him at Charlie Wong's. Dobie gives a touching speech. Maynard goes to the recruiting station. He learns his letter wasn't a draft notice, it was a classification notice. Maynard asks his parents if they would mind if he enlisted and they both approve. Maynard says that cousin Jerome should come and live with them. Dobie visits Maynard and finds out he's doing quite well in the Army. Note: This episode was written as an exit for the Maynard character, as Bob Denver had been drafted. First appearance of Michael J. Pollard as Jerome Krebs, cousin of (and a replacement for) Maynard. Bob Denver would fail his Army physical and return to the series, after the episodes "Love is a Science", "Couchville USA", and "The Sweet Singer of Central High" had been produced without him.
6	6	"The Sweet Singer of Central High"	Rod Amateau	Story by: Charles R. Marion; Teleplay by: Charles R. Marion & Ray Allen	November 10, 1959	3408
Thalia thinks Dobie could become rich by being a popular singer like Elvis Presley. Dobie starts singing and it isn't very good. Milton then sings the same song and he has a great voice. Thalia now wants to be Milton's manager. Milton says that Mr. Minafee has been asking him to join the school octet. Dobie auditions for the octet but doesn't get accepted. Milton, however, passes the audition. There is one position left. Dobie has been practicing singing so much that his throat is sore. It turns out his tonsils are inflamed and swollen. Dobie has a tonsillectomy and suddenly he has a beautiful singing voice. All the girls go crazy for Dobie and Thalia is once again interested in him. Dobie learns from the doctor that his voice is the way it is due to scar tissue. It may last and it may not. Thalia becomes Dobie's manager and starts a fan club. Dobie gets quite a swelled head. Even Herbert is having visions of wealth. It is the night of the octet singing competition between two schools. Mr. Binford (Joey Faye), from a recording company, is there to hear Dobie. He wants to sign Dobie to a contract. Dobie tells Thalia that because of his fans, he has to stay unattached. Suddenly Dobie's beautiful singing voice is gone. Melinda Casey as Central High Girl. Note: Michael J. Pollard's last appearance. Bob Denver does not appear in this episode.
7	7	"Greater Love Hath No Man"	Rod Amateau	Joel Kane & Jack Lloyd	November 17, 1959	3411
Dobie is in love with Pearl Arnold (Diane Jergens). Maynard suddenly shows up and tells Dobie he's been discharged from the Army. Later, Maynard literally bumps into Pearl. He doesn't know who she is but he finds her attractive. Dobie does something stupid and Herbert grounds him. So he can see Pearl, Dobie has Maynard stay in his room pretending to be him. To pay Maynard back, Dobie would like to help him get the girl he bumped into. Maynard doesn't think the girl will go for him, but Dobie wants to try. At the malt shop, Dobie discovers the girl Maynard likes is Pearl. Dobie has to decide between his love for Pearl or his friendship with Maynard. Dobie has a fantasy that he is Cyrano de Bergerac and he's helping Maynard woo Pearl. Back to reality and Dobie breaks things off with Pearl. He then helps Maynard get a date with her. Maynard is afraid and makes Dobie go with him to the malt shop to see Pearl. Dobie tries to explain to Pearl that he broke up with her to give his friend a chance with her. In the end, neither Dobie nor Maynard get Pearl. Note: Bob Denver failed his Army physical and rejoined the series.
8	8	"The Old Goat"	Rod Amateau	Fred S. Fox & Izzy Elinson	November 24, 1959	3414
The big football game between Central High and Webster High is this Saturday. Webster has beaten Central 15 years in a row and this year will likely be the same. Dobie believes that Webster always wins because each player pats the head of their good luck mascot, a goat. Dobie plans to steal the goat. That night, Dobie, Maynard and Randy go to where the goat is kept. The three manage to tie up the two student guards and get the goat. They hide the goat in Maynard's secluded room and pledge not to tell anyone. Word quickly spreads and it is hard for the boys not to brag about their theft. Some of the Webster guys figure out it was Dobie and Maynard that took the goat. They want to use a pretty girl to get the location of the goat out of Dobie. The guys send Vivienne and Dobie falls for her. Lovestruck Dobie admits to taking the goat and tells Vivienne where they're hiding it. Dobie realizes Vivienne was a spy and has to go move the goat. While walking the goat somewhere else, Officer Chuck Winters (Milton Frome) stops Dobie and Maynard. It turns out Chuck used to play football at Central and will help the boys. Figuring no one will look at the goats original storage place, they bring it back. Word gets out that Dobie stole the goat and all the girls want to be with him. Webster is so inspired that they come up with a huge win. All the girls leave Dobie. Joel Crothers as Ted Nelson.
9	9	"Dobie Gillis - Boy Actor"	Ralph Francis Murphy	Dean Riesner	December 1, 1959	3409
Despite having no acting experience, Dobie wants to try out for the lead in the school play. The reason is that beautiful Annabelle Huffaker, the president of the Drama Club, will likely play the female lead. Magnolias at Manassas: a Drama of the Civil War was written by teacher Ruth Erdlatz (Jesslyn Fax). At the try outs, Dobie learns that Milton Armitage is going for the lead role. Milton gets the part and because he was the only other candidate, Dobie will be his understudy. Dobie and Maynard want to find a way for Milton to not be able to perform, but they can't come up with anything. Rehearsals have begun and Mrs. Erdlatz reminds the students that there is a no kissing rule between the actors until the actual performance. Dobie tries to annoy Milton enough to where he might take a swing at Dobie which would oust him from the play. Mrs. Erdlatz prevents that from happening. Maynard comes up with another plan. It is the night of the performance. Maynard finds a way for Milton to fall through a trap door on the stage and be locked in the basement. Everyone is surprised when Dobie takes the stage. The play is in its third act and Milton manages to get out of the basement. Maynard was supposed to be in a fight scene with Dobie. Milton takes Maynard's place and throws Dobie off stage. Maynard gets Milton to fall through the trap door again. Despite all that, the play was a success.
10	10	"It Takes Two"	Rod Amateau	Max Shulman	December 8, 1959	3402
As usual, Dobie feels he can't get a girl because he has no money. At school, a new girl, Poppy Herring, comes into Mr. Pomfritt's class and Dobie thinks she's beautiful. Pomfritt discusses heredity vs. environment. Poppy agrees to have dinner with Dobie that evening. While she likes Dobie, Poppy tells him she is looking for a specific type of guy. The guy must want children, exactly three, a boy and two girls who she already has pictured in her mind. When Dobie mentions that his father is miserly and cruel, Poppy says they can't be together. Poppy is worried that those traits will be passed on to her children and she leaves. The next day, Dobie tries to tell Poppy that his father is really a kind and gentle man. He would like Poppy to meet Herbert. But now Dobie has to change his father's personality. Dobie makes a deal with Herbert to work all day if Herbert's nice to Poppy later. But Dobie messes up several grocery deliveries and Herbert gets into a lot of legal trouble. When Dobie brings Poppy to meet Herbert, Herbert chases him around the store and Poppy leaves. Sondra Rodgers as Mrs. Lear.
11	11	"Dobie's Birthday Party"	Rod Amateau	Ed James	December 15, 1959	3410
Dobie mentions that parents are undependable, especially his. Dobie's birthday is the next day. As a reminder to his parents, Dobie fakes it and tells them that he doesn't want them to mention it, let alone have a party. The next morning, Winnie tells Herbert that they're going to throw Dobie a surprise party. Dobie is sad when his parents really don't mention his birthday. Maynard knows about the party and needs to keep Dobie busy, but he's having a hard time getting him out of the house. Herbert finds a way to get Dobie to leave. Dobie and Maynard enlist their little friend Georgie (Ronny Howard) to help them get some money to go to the malt shop. When they get to the malt shop, there's no one there. It is time for the party and now Maynard can't get Dobie to go home. The party's been going on for a couple hours and still no Dobie. Dobie decides to go to Riff Ryan's (Tommy Farrell) record store, where Maynard ruins a sale for Riff. Dobie finally goes home and the party's over and everyone's gone. Dobie still pretends he didn't want a party, but inside he's very happy. Janice Carroll as Far-Out Girl.
12	12	"Deck The Halls"	Rod Amateau	Ray Allen	December 22, 1959	3416
It is Christmas Eve and Winnie, Dobie and Davey are at home. But Herbert is in jail, voluntarily. The Police Chief (Jack Albertson) begs him to leave, but Herbert's not going until Christmas is over. Fearing negative publicity, the Judge (Milton Frome) tries to reason with Herbert telling him the charge had been dropped against him. Herbert doesn't like the way people act at Christmas time. Dobie tells us how this all started. Winnie is pestering Herbert about who they should send a Christmas card to. He complains about customers wanting groceries giftwrapped. Dobie and Herbert have a disagreement over Christmas presents. Davey hits up Herbert for $50. Blossom Kenney irritates Herbert with a special Christmas gift request and then gets it for free. Maynard then causes a problem when he asks Herbert to hide a gift for Maynard's father. Mrs. Lapping (Verna Felton) wants to return a turkey she bought in June for more money than she paid for. Herbert gets so frustrated that he throws the turkey threw his store's front window. Back at the jail cell, the Police Chief and Judge get tired of talking to Herbert and say he deserves to stay in jail. The family comes by to spend Christmas with Herbert and he decides to go home. Alan Carney as Prisoner.
13	13	"Couchville, U.S.A."	Rod Amateau	Irving Brecher	December 29, 1959	3407
Dobie wants to take Thalia to the junior prom, but he doesn't have any money. Despite not having a date yet, Thalia proves she can get one at a moments notice. Thalia will give Dobie two days to come up with $6. Meanwhile, Winnie wants Herbert to try to be nicer to Dobie. Because of what Winnie said, Herbert agrees to pay Dobie to work at the grocery store. Dobie's working and he gets a call from Thalia who says she will definitely go to the prom with him. Dobie is now distracted and he misprices some canned ham for much less than it should be. Herbert is furious and Winnie tries to calm him down. Dr. Cligger (Harvey Stephens), a psychiatrist, is shopping in the store and Winnie thinks Herbert should talk to him about Dobie. Herbert thinks that maybe Dobie hates him in some way. Dr. Cligger says that if Herbert could get Dobie to admit his hatred, it may cure him. Herbert offers to give Dobie the $6 if Dobie admits he hates him. Dobie doesn't want to say it but Herbert basically forces him to do it. Later, Dobie gives Herbert a tie he bought. Herbert learns from Thalia that Dobie broke their prom date. Herbert finds out that Dobie used the $6 to buy the tie and he now believes Dobie loves him. Herbert gives Dobie more money for the prom. Note: Bob Denver does not appear in this episode.
14	14	"The Gaucho"	Rod Amateau	Fred S. Fox & Izzy Elinson	January 5, 1960	3413
Herbert wants to take in a boarder to earn extra money. Dobie worries that Thalia will think less of him if they have to take in a boarder to make ends meet. Thalia actually likes the idea as it will hopefully give Dobie more money to spend on her. Foreign transfer student Carlos Romero rents the room. Carlos is from Argentina and his father is Generalissimo Sebastien Romero, who is here to observe some local military maneuvers. Dobie introduces Carlos to some of the kids at the malt shop. Thalia takes an instant liking to Carlos as he is charming, suave and rich. Meanwhile, Herbert gets upset when Winnie spends a lot of money redecorating Carlos' room. Thalia comes by and winds up getting a date with Carlos. Dobie and Maynard plot to sabotage things for Carlos. They figure that he doesn't know very much English, so they give him a list of insulting slang words and terms. And they tell him in America the girl pays for herself. Dobie and Maynard are at the malt shop and watch Carlos and Thalia. Carlos uses the insults, but Thalia thinks it is cute because of his accent. Dobie fantasizes about being in Argentina and he's the one wooing the girls with his accent and American ways. Herbert would like to get rid of Carlos because it is costing him more than he's taking in. Carlos brings his father by to meet Winnie and tells him the insulting terms to use. After they leave, Winnie tells Dobie she wants Carlos out of the house.
15	15	"The Smoke-Filled Room"	Rod Amateau	Teleplay by: Ray Allen, Max Shulman & Bernie Gould; Story by: Bernie Gould	January 12, 1960	3420
Even though he's running unopposed, Milton is campaigning hard for junior class president. Thalia tries to tell Milton that people don't vote for someone who's too perfect. Thalia persuades Dobie to run against Milton and she'll be his campaign manager. Because it means he'll spend more time with her, Dobie agrees to run. Thalia thinks Dobie could go far in the lucrative world of politics. Dobie fantasizes about being sworn in as President. Maynard does some campaigning during class, much to the annoyance of Mr. Pomfritt. Some of his classmates tell Milton that Dobie has a good chance of winning with his man of the people style. Milton asks his Mother, Clarice Armitage, for help because she can get things done. Clarice goes to Herbert's grocery store with a large shopping list. She goes on to say that she will continue to shop at his store if he persuades Dobie to drop out of the race. Herbert reluctantly agrees to talk to Dobie. Herbert is very blunt to Dobie about what Mrs. Armitage said and tells him they could use the money. Dobie is about to tell Mr. Pomfritt that he's dropping out of the race, when Herbert and a bunch of students come by campaigning for Dobie. Dobie wins the election and Clarice continues to shop with Herbert. Note: First appearance of Doris Packer as Mrs. Armitage.
16	16	"The Fist Fighter"	Ralph Francis Murphy	John Kohn & Mel Diamond	January 19, 1960	3419
Thalia's newest kick is that she wants to date an athlete, because professional athletes make lots of money. Thalia now fawns over football team captain Milton. Dobie tells Maynard that he needs to become an athlete and chooses boxing. Dobie enlists the help of former school athletic legend Moose McCullough and they plan to stage a fight. In the malt shop, Dobie is talking to Thalia. Moose comes in and makes a play for Thalia. Dobie slugs Moose and knocks him down. Dobie is now known as "Top Fist". Despite all the guys now being afraid of Dobie, Milton calls Dobie's bluff and challenges him to a fight. Maynard tells Dobie to call off the fight, but Dobie has another idea. Dobie has Moose try and talk Milton out of fighting but it doesn't work. Moose tells Dobie he has to stand up to Milton. Dobie accidentally hurts his hand. Milton shows up with an injured hand as well and wants to call off the fight. Thalia thinks the two are faking it and wants nothing to do with either one. Anne Whitfield as Dibble. Note: Final appearance of Warren Beatty as Milton Armitage.
17	17	"The Hunger Strike"	Rod Amateau	Teleplay by: Ben Starr & Ray Allen; Story by: Ben Star	January 26, 1960	3423
Thalia admits to Dobie that she's interested in Chatsworth Osborne, Jr. because he's very rich. Dobie helps Maynard with a love poem he's studying. The poem gives Dobie the idea to become weak and pale to gain Thalia's sympathy. He'll do this by going on a hunger strike. Dobie tells his parents what he's doing and Herbert doesn't think it will last long. That night, Dobie is hungry and goes to the fridge to get something to eat. The alarm that Herbert set on the door goes off. The next day, some of the girl's tell Dobie they think it is wonderful that he's on a hunger strike for love. Herm (Ryan O'Neal) and some of the guys think Dobie's faking it and tell him they'll be watching. The hunger is really getting to Dobie. That night, Maynard sneaks Dobie some food. Thalia is still unimpressed and Maynard continues to bring Dobie food at night. Even though Herbert believes Dobie is eating, Winnie is worried and has Thalia come over. Winnie begs Thalia to say whatever she has to so that Dobie will eat again. They goes to Dobie's room and almost catch him eating a salami. When Thalia says she'll be with Dobie, Chatsworth says he'll go on a hunger strike. She leaves with Chatsworth. The next day, the guys jump Dobie, force him to eat something and take a picture. Herbert, Winnie and then Thalia force Dobie to eat something. Margaret (Marlo) Thomas as Frank's Girlfriend. Note: First appearance of Steve Franken as Chatsworth.
18	18	"The Flying Millicans"	Ralph Francis Murphy	Ray Allen	February 2, 1960	3417
Dobie's newest love is Aphrodite Millican (Yvonne Craig), despite she is new at school and he's only known her an hour. Dobie learns that she is very into mental and physical health. Dobie finds out that Aphrodite is part of the Four Flying Millicans, a traveling acrobatic troupe. Dobie meets her aging father, Prof. Millican (Francis X. Bushman). He and her two huge brothers are the other members of the troupe. Dobie makes a date with Aphrodite and she kisses him goodbye. Father thinks Dobie might make a good replacement for him in the act. Aphrodite tells her family that Dobie is the one for her. She and her family take on the task of whipping Dobie into shape so he can replace Mr. Millican. After many workouts, Dobie tells them that he doesn't think he'll ever be fit enough for them. But Mr. Millican wants to keep working on Dobie. Mr. Millican wants to check on Dobie's blood line and has Herbert drop off some groceries. The meeting doesn't go well, but they're still going to work on Dobie's strength. Later, Aphrodite tells Dobie that he has to put her out of his mind. She fell in love with him because he needed her help physically. But she has found someone who needs her help even more and it turns out to be Maynard.
19	19	"Room at the Bottom"	Rod Amateau	Max Shulman	February 9, 1960	3422
Math teacher, Mrs. Ruth Adams (Jean Byron), would like to see Dobie after class. She wonders why his grades aren't better. Ruth's husband Esmond (John Bryant) and her son Dan (Ron Howard) come by. Thalia wants Dobie to go to Willoughby Hall, an exclusive eastern prep school, where all the rich influential kids go. Dobie refuses, but Thalia says she'll find a way to make him go. Thalia talks to Herbert and Winnie about Dobie going to Willoughby Hall. Herbert is against the idea. Herbert then fantasizes about Dobie at Willoughby. Dobie rooms with Winthrop von Money VIII (Steve Franken). Dobie meets Winthrop's banker father, Winthrop von Money VII. The father gives Dobie a job at his bank and in the future, he will give Dobie a bank of his own. Herbert comes by and the father says he'll buy Herbert a chain of grocery stores. Back to reality, Herbert tells Dobie he's sending him to Willoughby, but Dobie doesn't want to go. Knowing that he'll never do it, Thalia agrees that if Dobie gets a 100 on his math test, he doesn't have to go to Willoughby and she'll be his girl. Dobie and Maynard go to Mrs. Ruth Adams house for her help. Esmond railroads the two into babysitting Dan while he and Ruth go to the movies. Dobie finds Ruth's math test. The next day, Ruth is a little suspicious when Dobie and Maynard get 100 on the test. Ruth is proud when Dobie and Maynard confess to cheating on the test. Herbert is still sending Dobie to Willoughby. But when he finds out that Maynard pulled some strings and will be Dobie's roommate at the school, he changes his mind. Note: Steve Franken appears in a different role than that of Chatsworth.
20	20	"The Power of Positive Thinking"	Rod Amateau	Louella MacFarland	February 16, 1960	3421
Thalia breaks a date with Dobie to go out with Chatsworth. Its not because Chatsworth's rich, it is because he can dominate her, which is what she wants in a man. Dobie is working in the grocery store when he meets Professor Dobkin (John Abbott). Dobkin believes one can obtain a dominating power by harnessing the Earth's electromagnetic energy. Dobie buys the Professor's book for $2.99. What Dobie doesn't know is that the Professor is a shyster and his theories are all made up. Chatsworth breaks a date with Thalia. Dobie comes by and tells Thalia she's going out with him. When she says she will, Dobie believes it is the power he learned from the book. Dobkin asks Dobie if he could give a lecture at the grocery store and sell some more books. Dobie says he'll use his power to make Herbert go out for the evening. Winnie tells Herbert that they're going to the movies. Dobie later tells Herbert that he's going to the movies. When he agrees, Dobie thinks it is his power again. Herbert leaves the movie early and finds his store full of people. Winnie gets Herbert to remain calm and Dobie thinks he did it. Dobie manages to sell a lot of the Dobkin's books. Dobie learns that Dobkin's theories are all a fake. Dobkin tells Dobie that if he believes in himself, he can do anything. Dobie dominates Chatsworth and wins Thalia back. Marjorie Bennett as Blossom Kenney.
21	21	"Dobie Spreads a Rumor"	Rod Amateau	Story by: George Beck; Teleplay by: George Beck & Max Shulman	February 23, 1960	3426
Zelda is more determined than ever of winning over Dobie. She brings him over to her house for something to eat. When Mr. Gilroy (Dabbs Greer) mentions marriage, Dobie leaves. Later at the malt shop, it bothers Dobie that Chatsworth has all these girls around him. Zelda spends some time at the grocery store and talks to Herbert and Winnie about marrying Dobie. Dobie decides to make Zelda more appealing to other boys by spreading a rumor that Zelda's father is inheriting one million dollars from a rich Uncle Max. Chatsworth and Alfred Wilson are both now calling Zelda for a date, but she turns them down. Zelda's sisters ask their mother (June Walker) who Uncle Max is and are they going to his funeral. Zelda even mentions how her friends are talking about all the things she can get because of the money. Mrs. Gilroy really believes her husband came into money and wants to install a pool. Mr. Gilroy, who just got a loan for his business, reluctantly agrees to use the money for the pool. Dobie tells his parents about the rumour he started. Herbert tells him the Gilroy's are really putting in a pool. Later, Zelda tells Dobie that she's his girl again as all the boys are gone. The pool was repossessed. Ahna Capri as Gilroy Daughter. Sherry Alberoni as Gilroy Daughter. Marlene Willis as Malt Shop Girl. Cynthia Pepper as Malt Shop Girl on Left.
22	22	"Love Is a Fallacy"	Rod Amateau	Max Shulman	March 1, 1960	3425
Thalia tells Dobie that to get rich, he needs a quick, sharp mind. But she says that he is always confused. Thalia breaks up with Dobie once again. At school, the kids are in Mr. McGruder's (Jason Wingreen) class and he's about to teach them the science of thinking. In walks a new and beautiful girl named Whitney (Ronnie Haran (uncredited)). She tells Mr. McGruder that because her wealthy family moves quite often, she craves security. After class, Whitney tells Dobie that he may go steady with her. Thalia says that Dobie is her boyfriend. The girl's tell Dobie he must choose and Dobie picks Thalia. Thalia also wants to teach Dobie how to think, but Dobie's mind keeps wandering. Frustrated that Dobie isn't paying attention, Thalia breaks up with him again. The next day Dobie tells Whitney that he's available. Thalia again takes Dobie back. Dobie tells Thalia that he's learned to think. He's not going to put up with her constantly dumping him and then taking him back. Whitney tells Dobie she doesn't want a guy that can think and she says she's now picked Maynard. Later, Maynard says that Whitney has moved again. Note: Based on Shulman's original short story of the same title.
23	23	"The Chicken From Outer Space"	Rod Amateau	Max Shulman	March 8, 1960	3428
No matter what he says or does, Dobie just can't seem to get rid of Zelda. Zelda knows Dobie isn't very bright and has no future career prospects, but she wants to help him. She's decided that after they're married, they will live on a farm and thus provide their own food. Zelda wants Dobie to enroll in a biology class and she will help him learn and pass the class. Mr. Millfloss, the Biology teacher, is stunned that Dobie and Maynard are in his class. Dobie, Maynard and Zelda are assigned to be a team. Their first project is to study the effects of hormones on chickens. One will be injected with female hormones, one will be injected with male hormones and the control chicken will get no injection. Dobie decides to keep the chickens in a store room in the basement of the grocery store. They tell Winnie that Herbert will never find out about the chickens. Herbert keeps on hearing rooster crows and to help Dobie, Winnie says that he's just imagining it. Dobie meets pretty Imogene Burkhart, who just moved into town. Imogene likes Dobie and wants to go out with him. Dobie now has to break things off with Zelda. Zelda refuses to let Dobie go. Because Zelda has something to do, Maynard in forced into giving the chickens their injections. He believes that a 2 cc injection means a 2 cup injection. Zelda finds a way for Imogene to lose interest in Dobie. The rooster's crowing now shakes the whole building. It comes up the stairs and is 10 feet tall. Herbert shoots it and it becomes small again.
24	24	"Dobie's Navy Blues"	Rod Amateau	Story by: Terry Ryan & Robert Van Scoyk; Teleplay by: Terry Ryan, Robert Van Scoyk & Ray Allen	March 15, 1960	3429
Dobie has had one date with Myrna Lomax (Yvonne Craig) and she is the girl for him. Unfortunately, Dobie didn't make a good first impression with her father, ex-navy man John Lomax (Harry von Zell). Dobie and Myrna have another date, but John wants her to break it. She says she can't get a hold of him and tells John the lists of errands Dobie had to do. John misunderstands and thinks Dobie is joining the Navy. Myrna lets John believe that and now John is all for Dobie. Myrna's friend Betty Lou calls and John mentions that Dobie has joined the Navy. Word quickly spreads and all of Dobie's friends congratulate him. Dobie enjoys the attention and doesn't tell them the truth. Myrna tells John that Dobie didn't didn't pass his Navy physical. Dobie gets carried away again and says how he wished he would've passed. John makes a phone call and then they go see Lt. Smedley (Robert Nichols) at the recruiting office. Lt. Smedley says that 17 year olds can't join unless Dobie gets his father to sign a consent form. John tells Herbert and Winnie about Dobie and the Navy and Winnie starts crying. Herbert tells Dobie he won't sign the consent form. Dobie starts to go overboard about joining and Herbert signs the form. Fortunately for Dobie, Herbert actually signed his inventory sheet. Anne Whitfield as Malt Shop Girl. Note: This episode aired on the airdate originally intended for "Almost a Father", which was partially reshot as "Rock-a-Bye Dobie" (episode 39)
25	25	"Taken to the Cleaners"	Ralph Francis Murphy	Story by: Ray Allen; Teleplay by: Ray Allen & Max Shulman	March 29, 1960	3424
Dobie wants to take Thalia to the dance on Saturday. She'll go under some expensive conditions and Dobie has to sign a contract. Among other things, Thalia wants to take a taxi and have her dress cleaned beforehand. Dobie will need $11 and asks Herbert for the money. Dobie and Thalia go to a new dry cleaner shop operated by a Mr. Edwards (Dick Elliott) and he's running a 2-for-1 special. Thalia convinces Mr. Edwards to have them act as his agents and they will bring business into the shop from their fellow students. Thalia would like a modest commission. What she doesn't know is that Edwards, with his partner Gunnison (Joey Faye), plans to steal all the clothes that they take in. Dobie has all the kids drop off their clothes at the grocery store. Herbert is furious, but takes the clothes to the cleaners. While he's waiting for the receipt, Edwards and Gunnison leave out the back. Officer Mulcahey (Alan Carney) comes in and accuses Herbert of being the crook and arrests him. The Police Chief (Ben Welden) tells Mulcahey he got the wrong man and the crooks got away. Herbert tells Dobie he will have to work to earn enough money to pay for all the stolen clothes. Thalia feels bad and would like Dobie and Maynard to help her lose her lust for money. The three see the crooks next to their broken down truck and get Officer Mulcahey to arrest them. Mulcahey tells Thalia that she'll get a $50 reward and her love for money returns.
26	26	"That's Show Biz"	Rod Amateau	Max Shulman	April 5, 1960	3430
Dobie is seeing Clothilde Ellingboe (Roberta Shore). Her parents, Cecil (Richard Deacon) and Laurabelle Ellingboe (Reta Shaw), wonder why they have never met Dobie's parents. Cecil and Laurabelle are members of the Central High School Students and Parents Betterment League (CHSSPBL). Dobie parents don't belong to that group and because of that, Dobie may longer see Clothilde. Dobie has to convince Herbert to go to a CHSSPBL meeting. Herbert wants nothing to do with it, but Winnie says they'll go. It turns out the next meeting was postponed because the board members of CHSSPBL are discussing their upcoming musical revue, which is known as the CHSSPBL Capers. Clarice Armitage, Ruth Adams and Blossom Kenney mention some of the acts from the faculty that will perform. Ruth says that they still need help with backstage labor. Just then, Herbert and Winnie walk in. Thanks to Winnie, Herbert is stuck helping Ruth backstage. It is the night of the revue and many of the audience are slowly walking out. Cecil, Laurabelle and their son Arthur (Joey D. Vieira credited as Donald Keeler) perform a skit about Napoleon. Even more people leave. Herbert tells Ruth that the show is a flop. Winnie sings a song with Dobie and Maynard dressed as lambs. Herbert convinces Ruth to dance a number together and the audience loves it. Later, a School Board Member (Burt Mustin credited as Burt Muskin) holds a special meeting to investigate charges made by the Ellingboe's. They thought it was disgraceful how Ruth showed off her legs. Herbert and Ruth dance for the Board and they love it. Dobie is proud of his father.
27	27	"The Prettiest Collateral in Town"	Rod Amateau	Story by : Jerry Davis; Teleplay by : Joel Kane	April 12, 1960	3432
Dobie is in love with Melissa Frome (Yvonne Lime) and she's crazy about him. Dobie worries because it is almost too perfect. Maynard borrows some money from Dobie because he destroyed some lab equipment. Now Dobie doesn't have enough money to take Melissa to see The Kingston Trio this Saturday. Meanwhile, Herbert wants a loan and Mr. McCurdy (Hugh Sanders), from the bank, comes by to look over the store. McCurdy's daughter Mignonne (Sherry Jackson) comes by and sees Dobie. Mignonne is a rigid and self-assured person. She wants a pliable man she can mold into her vision, and that man is Dobie. To secure the bank loan, Herbert has to get Dobie to be Mignonne's date for a party she's giving on Saturday night. Dobie doesn't want to go on the date, but agrees to meet Mignonne. Realizing Herbert won't otherwise get the loan, Dobie will date Mignonne. Dobie figures the only way he can have Melissa want to break up with him is to be mean to her. Dobie feels bad for what he did and tells off Mignonne. Mr. McCurdy overhears and wants to know how Dobie did it as McCurdy would like to stand up to his wife. Rose Marie as Mrs. Tarantino the Waitress. Note: Working title: "He Who Gets Slapped".
28	28	"Live Alone and Like It"	Guy Scarpitta	Story by: Sumner Long; Teleplay by: Joel Kane & Sumner Long	April 19, 1960	3431
Dobie feels that his parents still treat him like a child. Herbert is too strict and Winnie coddles him. Dobie wants to move out on his own. Neither parent wants Dobie to leave. Herbert says that Dobie would come crawling back in a week. Herbert agrees to let Dobie go. But Dobie has to agree that if he does fail and wants to come back, that he never brings up moving out again. Dobie is having a hard time finding a place he can afford. Dobie asks Maynard to be his roommate. They rent a place from Mrs. Finch (Esther Dale). It is not long before Dobie and Maynard get on each other's nerves. They can't cook, clean or manage their money, but Dobie won't give Herbert the satisfaction by moving home. Herbert reluctantly admits that he misses Dobie. Winnie comes by the apartment when the boys are gone and sees what a mess it is. Later, Herbert comes by and the boys are afraid to let him in. Herbert and the boys are surprised to find the apartment all cleaned up. Herbert says he'll treat Dobie as an adult and convinces him to come home. Herbert knows that Winnie cleaned the place because he found her glasses.
29	29	"The Big Sandwich"	Rod Amateau	Ray Allen & Ben Gershman	April 26, 1960	3404
Thalia agrees to go with Dobie to the school picnic on Saturday if he can get his dad's car. She plans on charging some friends for transportation to the picnic. It turns out that Herbert and Winnie are going away for the weekend to a reunion with Winnie's family. Dobie can't get the car and can't go to the picnic because he has to watch the grocery store. Without telling Dobie, Thalia has another plan to make money. She orders $46 worth of sandwich supplies on Herbert's account and plans to make 400 sandwiches to sell at the picnic. At 25-cents apiece they'll make a $54 profit. Dobie goes along with the plan, and with Maynard's help, they start making the sandwiches. They then notice that it is pouring rain outside and the picnic will be cancelled. Meanwhile at the reunion, Herbert has to deal with obnoxious Wilfred (Gordon Jones). Because of something Wilfred said, Herbert worries how Dobie's doing at the store. Herbert calls Dobie and Dobie tells him how they're stuck with 400 sandwiches. Herbert can't overreact because Wilfred is right there. The picnic is rescheduled for the next day. In an attempt to keep the sandwiches fresh, they're put in a freezer, but are now frozen solid. Dobie is able to salvage 300 sandwiches, but then it starts raining again. Dobie finds a way to hold the picnic in a pavilion, but then learns he can't sell the sandwiches there. Note: Final regular appearance of Tuesday Weld as Thalia.
30	30	"Soup and Fish"	Rod Amateau	Teleplay by: Phil Davis & Joel Kane; Story by: Phil Davis	May 3, 1960	3433
Dobie mentions how Chatsworth is rich, but not happy. Despite his money, he's not popular. Chatsworth would like to be accepted as part of the group. Dobie and Maynard run into Sabrina Armitage, Milton's sister. She's been away for three years at an exclusive private school. Sabrina's looking for her cousin Chatsworth to invite him to a party. Not knowing many people in town, she invites both Dobie and Maynard as well. Maynard doesn't want to go until he meets Sabrina's bohemian friend, Venice West. Sabrina says that the party is formal. Herbert would very much like to get Mrs. Armitage's business and hopes Dobie will put in a good word. But Herbert is also worried that Dobie will embarrass the name of Gillis. It is the night of the party and Tremblay (Clinton Sundberg) the butler won't let Dobie and Maynard in because they're not wearing a tuxedo. To be one of the boys, Chatsworth agrees to share his tuxedo, with each on rotating thirty minute shifts. Things go wrong when the guys tear the tux pants in half and Herbert comes by the party to make a delivery.
31	31	"Where There's a Will"	Rod Amateau	Ray Allen	May 10, 1960	3434
Dobie says how proud Herbert is that he has a lawyer, Mr. Martindale (Robert Nichols). However, Martindale complains that he can't get Herbert to sign his will. Meanwhile, after twenty-four years of marriage, Herbert is finally able to take Winnie on a honeymoon. Dobie would like some money to take dance lessons, but Herbert says no. Davey, who's home from college, wants money to play golf and Herbert gives him $1. Something Dobie does causes Herbert to hurt his back and Maynard mentions Herbert's age. Mrs. Lapping (Arlene Harris) comes by the store and tells Herbert about a friend who passed away suddenly. Herbert signs his will and tells Winnie he's worried about what will happen to her if he should die. Herbert has a dream about how successfully his sons run his store after he's gone. And Winnie is seeing wealthy Señor Carlos (Eduardo Noriega). Herbert wakes up and finds Winnie and the boys having a hard time running the store. Blanche Sweet as Mrs. Dowell. Ronny Howard as Little Boy Eating Candy Bar. Note: Final appearance of Darryl Hickman as Davey Gillis; Dobie is regarded as an only child in future seasons.
32	32	"Put Your Feet In Our Hands"	Robert Butler	Story by : Nord Riley; Teleplay by : Joel Kane	May 17, 1960	3435
Dobie doesn't like to work. Daphne Root (Diana Millay) is upset with Chatsworth because he has never done a decent day of work in his whole life. Daphne believes hard work is what has made this country great. She no longer wants anything to do with Chatsworth. Daphne meets Dobie and says she likes him because he looks like a worker. Daphne says she wants to come by the grocery store and see Dobie work. Dobie and Maynard start working in the store. Maynard manages to ruin Blossom Kenney's ground sirloin. Daphne comes by and Dobie tells her that he's quiting to look for another job. She offers him a job working as a salesman in her father's shoe store. At the shoe store, Dobie meets Mr. Root. Chatsworth shows up and because he wants another chance with Daphne, he volunteers to work as well. Daphne says she'll go out that night with the boy that sells the most shoes. Chatsworth sells a lot of shoes because he helps pay for them. Dobie has Maynard tell Chatsworth's mother, Clarissa, that her son is working. Clarissa drags Chatsworth out of the store. That night, Dobie is too tired to go out with Daphne and he falls asleep. Daphne goes out with Chatsworth. Cheerio Meredith as Shoe Store Customer. Virginia Sale as Shoe Store Customer. Note: Doris Packer's character becomes Mrs. Chatsworth Osborne, Sr. from this point on. First occurrences of Maynard's trademark cry of "Work?!"
33	33	"Competition Is the Life of Trade"	Robert Gordon	Dick Conway, Roland MacLane & Joel Kane	May 24, 1960	3436
Dobie meets Delphine Quimby (Sally Todd), who just moved into town from Cleveland. Chatsworth shows up and introduces himself. Delphine is impressed with Chatsworth's wealth and sophistication and leaves with him. Herbert tells Dobie that he must try and compete with Chatsworth. Herbert learns that a new grocery store is opening up in town and is owned by Mr. Quimby (Jack Albertson). Winnie thinks Herbert should go check out the competition, but not let Quimby know who he is. Dobie and Maynard go to see Delphine and meet Mr. Quimby. Not knowing Quimby is opening a grocery store, Dobie mentions his father's store. Delphine tells Dobie that Chatsworth is too conceited and Dobie volunteers to help unpack boxes for her father. He soon realizes Quimby's is a grocery store. Just as he tries to leave, Maynard and Herbert show up, so Dobie hides. Herbert finds Dobie and Mr. Quimby figures out who Herbert really is. Chatsworth asks his mother's help in winning Delphine, but she refuses. Chatsworth comes by Quimby's store. He tells Mr. Quimby he will place weekly large orders if he can get a date with Delphine. Mrs. Osborne agrees to help Dobie by placing large orders at Herbert's store. This backfires, because Dobie is busy helping Herbert with the orders and he can't go out with Delphine. This results with her going out with Chatsworth.
34	34	"The French, They Are a Funny Race"	Rod Amateau	Story by : Harvey Helm & Bernard Drew; Teleplay by : Joel Kane	May 31, 1960	3437
Maynard is 18 and has come to realize that his life lacks direction. Dobie and Maynard ask teacher Mr. Millfloss his advice. He suggests that if Maynard had someone that was dependent on him, it would give Maynard a sense of purpose. Mr. Millfloss thinks Maynard should find a girl who needed him. Dobie meets a girl he's never seen before and it turns out she only speaks French. Dobie frightens the girl and Maynard goes to comfort her. Maynard learns that her name is Francoise Desjardins and she is from Paris. Despite Maynard not speaking French, the two manage to communicate in other ways and he helps her to fit in. Maynard is very happy, but then Chatsworth enters the picture and he speaks French. To compete with Chatsworth, Dobie wants to make over Maynard. To get money, Maynard sells his turntable and records to Riff Ryan. Maynard goes to barber Mr. Sneed (Joey Faye) and reluctantly gets his beard shaved off. Maynard arrives to class clean shaven and in a suit and tie. But Francoise still only talks to Chatsworth. Maynard later learns that Francoise liked his old look better. And she only talked to Chatsworth because she missed speaking French with someone. Francoise returns to France, but writes Maynard.
35	35	"The Unregistered Nurse"	H. Bruce Humberstone	Phil Davis	June 7, 1960	3412
Dobie falls for the slightly older Valerie Brown (Nancy Hadley), a nurse receptionist at Dr. Simpson's (John Stephenson) medical office. He keeps trying to make an impression with Valerie, but nothing works. Dobie decides to fake an illness to get Valerie's sympathy. Maynard and Dobie go to the library and find a disease and its symptoms. Dr. Simpson can't find anything wrong with Dobie and decides to take a blood test. Dobie's friend Eldon (Tommy Ivo) runs errands for the Doctor and takes Dobie's blood to the lab. Dr. Simpson tells Valerie that Dobie has a crush on her. What Dobie doesn't know is that the Doctor and Valerie are going together. Dobie finds a way to change his blood work report before Eldon can deliver it to Dr. Simpson. Valerie reads the report and calls a Health Dept. Official (Jack Orrison). Dobie has a highly contagious disease and he and everyone he's come in contact with must be quarantined. Dobie goes to see Valerie and a Policeman (Herb Vigran) comes to put him in isolation. But Dr. Simpson arrives and he's seen the real blood report. Dobie finds out about the Doctor and Valerie. Dobie thinks he'll never find another girl and then he sees Cora Klaus (Carole Wells).
36	36	"The Long Arm of the Law"	Guy Scarpitta	Lee Karson & Joel Kane	June 14, 1960	3438
Dobie's new love is Arabella Parmalee. He's in the park picking flowers for her and then Maynard helps him, despite a "No Picking Flowers" sign. A Police Officer (Richard Reeves) sees them. He yells at Dobie and Maynard and things do not go well. Meanwhile, Arabella tells her mother Edith (Margie Liszt) what a nice boy Dobie is and how much she likes him. Sam Parmalee comes home and he's the policeman that confronted Dobie. Maynard is afraid he'll loose Dobie's friendship because of Arabella. Dobie lets Maynard go with to pick up Arabella and go to the movies. The guys arrive at Arabella's house and meet Edith. They then make a lot of insulting comments about the policeman they ran into. The guys see Sam and Sam tries to kick them out. Edith likes Dobie and says he can go out with Arabella. Sam visits Herbert and Winnie and tells them that he wants Dobie to stop seeing Arabella. Herbert and Winnie refuse to stop Dobie. Meanwhile, Arabella is getting tired of Maynard hanging around with her and Dobie. Sam threatens Herbert with several citations. Herbert comes back with officer physical requirements. But then the two learn they both belong to the Order of Bisons. Arabella is tired of Maynard being around and breaks up with Dobie. Note: Dobie's hair is dark.
37	37	"Here Comes the Groom"	Rod Amateau	Story by : George Beck; Teleplay by : Joel Kane & Max Shulman	June 21, 1960	3439
Dobie is tired of being rejected by girl after girl. Dobie tells his parents that he needs to get married. Herbert thinks he's crazy, but Winnie gives her blessing. After Dobie leaves, Winnie says what's the chance of Dobie finding someone to marry. And what's the chance that girl's parents would allow it. Zelda agrees to marry Dobie, but she sees it happening after they're out of college. Dobie wants to get married soon. Zelda wants a courtship and comes up with a plan to postpone the wedding for quite a while. Zelda thinks her father will be totally against a quick marriage. When Zelda tells her father, Walter Gilroy (Dabbs Greer) is thrilled with the idea. Walter tells his wife Edna (Joan Banks) that he was just using a little reverse psychology to get Zelda to change her mind. Walter also believes that Herbert would never consent to the marriage. Now girls like Bernadine, Monica and Mary Ellen are interested in Dobie. Dobie begins to regret thinking about getting married. The Gilroy's and the Gillis' regret that their plans are backfiring but can't say anything to their children. The two families and Maynard are with the Justice of Peace, Jethro R. Wiggins (Burt Mustin). Thankfully, Maynard stops the ceremony from finalizing and everyone is happy.
38	38	"A Taste for Lobster"	Rod Amateau	Arnold Horwitt	June 28, 1960	3418
Dobie meets Gwyneth Krausmeyer and she likes him and hates material wealth and money. Herbert gets suspicious when Dobie stops asking him for money. Dobie and Gwyneth are sitting in the park. Thirteen-year-old Chrissie Tyler (Michael Burns, soon to join the cast of Wagon Train) comes by with a sales pitch. He runs a lucrative babysitting business and would like to hire them as sitters. He says they can make quite a bit of money, but Gwyneth makes Dobie get rid of him. Gwyneth would like to help Chrissie give up his materialistic ways. Chrissie runs his business out of Charlie Wong's ice cream parlor and Gwyneth and Dobie go to talk to him. Dobie is impressed with the amount of money Chrissie makes a week. Gwyneth thinks her younger sister Hermione (Gina Gillespie) may be able to help Chrissie. Chrissie meets Hermione and he is quite taken with her. They start seeing each other and Chrissie gives her a lot of expensive gifts. Gwyneth actually starts getting jealous of Hermione and disappointed in Dobie's lack of money. Dobie starts his own sitting service and steals all of Chrissie's young workers by charging less of a commission. Chrissie eventually asks Dobie for a job. Dobie finally has money, but Gwyneth realizes that life isn't for her. She tells Dobie that she now loves Maynard. The children tell Dobie they're starting their own sitting service. Billy Booth as Boy. Donald Keeler as Bobby Wilkins.
39	39	"Rock-A-Bye Dobie"	Rod Amateau	Ray Allen	July 5, 1960	3427
Dobie is in love with and practically engaged to Jenny Metzger (Denise Alexander). Jenny meets Herbert and Winnie and Herbert clearly doesn't approve of Jenny. And he doesn't like the idea of Dobie and her getting married. After Dobie and Jenny leave, Winnie asks Herbert if he's even had "the talk" with Dobie. Jenny thinks that in order to get Herbert on their side, Dobie needs a job so he can support them when they're married. She suggests they start a babysitting service. While Dobie gets baby supplies from the store, Herbert tries to "talk" to him. Dobie seems to know more than Herbert expected. When Winnie and Herbert figure out what Dobie took from the store, they believe he's already married and has a baby. Dobie and Jenny are sitting for a baby and Maynard is visiting. Winnie invites Esmond (Don Knotts) and Mrs. Metzger (Kathleen Freeman) over to get to know them. Winnie tells them their children are married and have a baby. Mrs. Metzger doesn't believe it and they leave. When Herbert calls a number that Dobie can be reached at, they hear Dobie and a baby crying. Herbert and Winnie go to that address and everything gets straightened out. Note: Originally filmed as "Almost A Father", this episode was originally to have aired March 15, 1960) but was delayed by more than three months. because of affiliate complaints as it implied that Herbert thought Dobie had sired a child out of wedlock. This revised version was shown later in the season.
