= Tanks a Million =

1941 film by Fred Guiol

- Original film poster
- Directed by: Fred Guiol
- Written by: Edward E. Seabrook; Paul Gerard Smith; Warren Wilson
- Produced by: Hal Roach
- Starring: William Tracy; James Gleason; Elyse Knox; Joe Sawyer
- Cinematography: Robert Pittack
- Edited by: Richard C. Currier
- Music by: Edward Ward
- Production company: Hal Roach Studios
- Distributed by: United Artists
- Release date: 12 September 1941
- Running time: 50 minutes
- Country: United States
- Language: English
- Budget: $98,049
- Box office: $283,707

Tanks a Million is a 1941 American comedy film directed by Fred Guiol. It was the first of Hal Roach's Streamliners, short films under an hour designed for the lower half of a double feature. The two leading characters, whiz-kid sergeant Doubleday (played by William Tracy) and his rival Sergeant Ames (Joe Sawyer), would go on to feature in seven more films, though the series has no overall title.

Despite the title and military setting, no tanks are seen in the film.

== Plot summary ==
Dorian Doubleday, "Dodo" to his friends, works as a clerk at a railway station but he has the ability of photographic memory. When he is drafted in the Army, he memorizes all the manuals for Army procedure immediately before starting his service.

Because of his extensive knowledge of procedure, he is quickly known as a know-it-all at the basic training in Camp Carver. His drill sergeant, Sergeant Ames, disapproves of him from the start, but the officers above him are quite impressed with the new recruit due to his memorization and verbatim recital of Army regulations.

On his first day in the Army Dodo is sent to non-commissioned officer school but after a brief time he returns to inform the officers that as he proficiently demonstrated his knowledge of military regulations he was ordered to sew on First Sergeant chevrons and return to his unit. This infuriates the now-outranked Ames as it has taken him twenty years to make buck sergeant. Sgt. Ames sees his chance for revenge when he insists Dodo is put in charge of the worst and most chaotic company on the camp: Company F. The soldiers try to make things hard for Dodo, by following his orders to the letter. When Dodo orders his company to report for training in overcoats, rifles and full packs, the men fall out only wearing these items with no other clothing. As soon as Sergeant Ames hears this he reports it to Major Greer, hoping it will shorten Dodo's career as a non-commissioned officer.

When the officer threatens the men with 30 days imprisonment, Dodo explains that he is just trying out some new ideas, training with a minimal amount of equipment. He claims his men are of a tough Kentucky breed and can walk without shoes. However, Greer buys this and has the company march around barefoot all day, but they are neither imprisoned nor fined.

Dodo's reputation as a drill sergeant spreads, and he is swarmed by impressed camp hostesses at a dance that night. When Company F is ordered to perform guard duty, his soldiers relieve each other by riding on different kinds of vehicles, including a mule based on their interpretation of an army regulation for posting guards.

When the mule ruins the marching band parade, Captain Rossmead is upset and punishes the men with extra guard duty. Dodo accepts the punishment on behalf of his men, but the Captain decides to not carry out the punishment when his Major informs him that as the Captain his duties of Officer of the Day didn't specify which specific method of transportation to use when posting the guards of his command, upsetting Ames in the process.

Dodo becomes very popular among his men due to taking the blame. They promise to do their best and be loyal to Dodo from now on. But Ames doesn't give up. He gets Rossmead to assign Dodo to be an orderly under infamous Colonel Barkley, known as "Spitfire".

Ames' plan backfires, as Dodo accidentally makes a radio pep speech the Colonel was supposed to make, and it is a huge success. The Colonel has stage-fright and is afraid of microphones, and accepts Dodo's posing as him for a moment while making the speech.

While Dodo tries on the Colonel's uniform, his girlfriend arrives to camp and believes he has been promoted to colonel. Dodo lets her believe this while he makes the speech. When he is done, Ames and Rossmead arrest him for insubordination, but since the success of the speech has reached all the way to Washington, Dodo is not punished, but returned to duty with Sgt. Ames becoming the Colonel's regular orderly.

== Cast ==
- William Tracy as 1st Sgt. Dorian "Dodo" Doubleday
- James Gleason as Col. "Spitfire" Barkley
- Noah Beery Jr. as Charlie Cobb
- Joe Sawyer as Sgt. William Ames
- Elyse Knox as Jeannie
- Douglas Fowley as Capt. Rossmead
- Knox Manning as Radio Interviewer Cardigan
- Frank Faylen as Pvt. Skivic
- Dick Wessel as Pvt. Monkman
- Frank Melton as Pvt. Cleary
- Harold Goodwin as Lt. Caldwell
- William Gould as Maj. Greer
- Norman Kerry as Major

== Soundtrack ==
- "You're in the Army Now"

== Tracy and Sawyer series ==
- Tanks a Million, 50 minutes, 12 September 1941
- Hay Foot, 48 minutes, 2 January 1942
- About Face, 43 minutes, 16 April 1942
- Fall In, 45 minutes, 5 March 1943
- Yanks Ahoy, 60 minutes, 29 June 1943
- Here Comes Trouble, 55 minutes, 15 March 1948, following the Tracy and Sawyer team into civilian life
- As You Were, 57 minutes, 5 October 1951, released by Lippert Pictures
- Mr. Walkie Talkie, 65 minutes, 28 November 1952, released by Lippert Pictures
