= Racket Squad =

- Genre: Crime drama Anthology
- Starring: Reed Hadley
- Narrated by: Hugh Beaumont (1952–1953)
- Composers: Herschel Burke Gilbert; Leon Klatzkin; Alexander Laszlo; Herbert Taylor
- Country of origin: United States
- Original language: English
- No. of seasons: 3
- No. of episodes: 98 (list of episodes)

Production
- Executive producers: Hal Roach; Hal Roach, Jr.
- Producers: Carroll Case; Hal Roach, Jr.
- Camera setup: Single-camera
- Running time: 23–26 minutes
- Production companies: Showcase Productions, Inc. Rabco Productions

Original release
- Network: CBS
- Release: June 7, 1951 – September 28, 1953

Racket Squad is an American TV crime drama series that aired from 1951 to 1953.

The format was a narrated anthology drama, as each individual episode featured various ordinary citizens getting ensnared in a different confidence scheme (con). Episodes were introduced and narrated by Reed Hadley as "Captain John Braddock", a fictional detective working for a police department in a large, unnamed American city. Braddock served as the series' host and narrator.

== Synopsis ==
The show dramatized the methods and machinations of con men and bunko artists. At episode's end, Captain Braddock gave viewers advice on how to avoid becoming the victim of the con game illustrated in the episode. Plots were based on actual case files from United States police departments, business organizations, and other agencies.

In the original episodes, Braddock addressed the victim in the second person, addressing the victim directly. In later episodes, he narrated in the more conventional third person. Shooting was rapid, with 44 pages of script shot in two days.

== Production ==
The show originally was produced for the syndication market in 1950, was picked up by CBS in 1951, and ran on the network through 1953. The series was filmed at Hal Roach Studios in Culver City, California, and was sponsored by cigarette manufacturer Philip Morris. The shows were produced at a cost of $25,000 per episode, which was cheap for the time. Racket Squad finished at number 30 in the Nielsen ratings for the 1951–1952 season.

Showcase Productions (Hal Roach Jr. and Carroll Case) produced the series, with James Flood as director. The writers were George C. Brown and Ed Seabrook.

== Guest stars ==
The show featured several guest stars who achieved starring roles in future film and television roles:

- Lola Albright (Edie Hart in Peter Gunn)
- Hugh Beaumont (Ward Cleaver in Leave It to Beaver)
- Mary Castle (Frankie Adams in Stories of the Century)
- Jan Clayton (Ellen Miller in Lassie)
- Jackie Coogan (Uncle Fester in The Addams Family), billed as "John L. Coogan"
- Will Geer (Grandpa Walton in The Waltons)
- Dayton Lummis (Marshal Andy Morrison in Law of the Plainsman)
- Eve McVeagh (Mildred Fuller in High Noon, Roberta—Lucy's Hairdresser in I Love Lucy, and Frances Moseby in The Clear Horizon)
- Carole Mathews (Wilma Fansler in The Californians)
- Ewing Mitchell (Sheriff Mitch Hargrove in Sky King)
- Noel Neill (Lois Lane in Adventures of Superman)
- John M. Pickard (Captain Shank Adams in Boots and Saddles)
- Gloria Saunders (The Dragon Lady in Terry and the Pirates)
- Karen Sharpe (Laura Thomas in Johnny Ringo)
- Robert Shayne (Inspector Henderson in Adventures of Superman)
- Frank Wilcox (oil executive John Brewster on The Beverly Hillbillies and Federal District Atty. Beecher Asbury in The Untouchables)

After Racket Squad, Reed Hadley starred from March 1954 to June 1955 in another crime drama on CBS, The Public Defender.

== Episodes ==
Season	Episodes	Originally released	
Season	Episodes	First released	Last released
1	13	June 7, 1951	August 30, 1951
2	50	September 6, 1951	August 28, 1952
3	35	September 4, 1952	September 7, 1953

== Release ==
Alpha Video released various episodes on DVD Worldwide Distribution.

DVD name	Ep #	Release date
Racket Squad, Vol. 1	4	2003
Racket Squad, Vol. 2	4	2005
Racket Squad, Vol. 3	4	2005
Racket Squad, Vol. 4	4	2005
Racket Squad, Vol. 5	4	2009
Racket Squad, Vol. 6	4	2009
Racket Squad, Vol. 7	4	2011
Racket Squad Vol. 8	4	2011
Racket Squad Vol. 9	4	2011
Racket Squad Vol. 10	4	2012
Racket Squad Vol. 11	4	2012

== Reception ==
Year	Award	Result	Category	Recipient
1953	Emmy Award	Nominated	Best Mystery, Action or Adventure Program	–
1955	Emmy Award	Nominated	Best Mystery or Intrigue Series	–

== Critical response ==
In a review of an episode from the second season, the trade publication Variety said that Racket Squad "adds up to fair entertainment" and noted that some members of the audience might benefit from warnings presented in the show. The review added that the episode's dramatic component "was competently played".
