= Love at First Bite (1950 film) =

1950 short film starring the Three Stooges

- Directed by: Jules White
- Written by: Felix Adler
- Produced by: Jules White
- Starring: Moe Howard; Larry Fine; Shemp Howard; Christine McIntyre; Yvette Reynard; Marie Monteil; Al Thompson
- Cinematography: Rex Wimpy
- Edited by: Edwin H. Bryant
- Distributed by: Columbia Pictures
- Release date: May 4, 1950 (U.S.)
- Running time: 16:04
- Country: United States
- Language: English

Love at First Bite is a 1950 short subject directed by Jules White starring American slapstick comedy team The Three Stooges (Moe Howard, Larry Fine and Shemp Howard). It is the 123rd entry in the series released by Columbia Pictures starring the comedians, who released 190 shorts for the studio between 1934 and 1959.

== Plot ==
The Stooges are busy making last-minute preparations for a triple marriage to their fiancées, whom they met during their military service in Europe. The young women hail from Italy, Austria, and France, and the ship that will bring them to America is due to arrive in a matter of hours. To unwind, the stooges take turns recounting how they met their brides-to-be. To commemorate these memories, the trio partakes in a toast with Old Panther whisky, a liquor so potent that the stooges are instantly drunk. In their intoxicated state, Shemp reacts to an insult from Moe by challenging him to a duel. The weapon they settle on is seltzer bottles. Moe's assault leaves Shemp so waterlogged that he falls to the floor.

Moe and Larry mistakenly conclude that Shemp has died. They devise a plan to dispose of his supposed remains by encasing his feet in a tub filled with cement, intending to submerge him in the ocean. While waiting for the cement to set, they take a nap. Upon awakening, they find themselves afflicted with hangovers and amnesia, unable to recollect the events leading to Shemp's predicament.

In a hasty attempt to reunite with their fiancées, Moe and Larry resort to loading the tub with dynamite, resulting in a violent explosion that propels them onto the docks where their partners await. Shemp remains trapped in the cement, inadvertently pulling the French girl into the water upon her attempt to embrace him, dousing the other couples with the ensuing splash.

== Cast ==
=== Credited ===
- Moe Howard as Moe
- Larry Fine as Larry
- Shemp Howard as Shemp
- Harriette Tarler as Parisian waitress
- Christine McIntyre as Katrina
- Yvette Reynard as Fifi
- Marie Monteil as Maria

=== Uncredited ===
- Judy Malcolm as female Cafe customer
- Johnny Kascier as Male Cafe customer
- Al Thompson as Sleeping Man in Restaurant
- Slim Gaut as second Male Cafe customer

== Production notes ==
Love at First Bite was filmed August 18–22, 1948, but not released until May 1950. It was partially remade in 1958 as Fifi Blows Her Top, using minimal stock footage.
