= As You Were (film) =

1951 film by Bernard Girard

- Directed by: Bernard Girard; Fred Guiol
- Written by: Edward E. Seabrook
- Produced by: Hal Roach Jr.
- Starring: William Tracy; Joe Sawyer; Russell Hicks
- Cinematography: Benjamin H. Kline
- Music by: Leon Klatzkin
- Production companies: R & L Productions
- Distributed by: Lippert Pictures
- Release date: October 5, 1951
- Running time: 57 minutes
- Country: United States
- Language: English

As You Were is a 1951 American comedy film directed by Bernard Girard and Fred Guiol and starring William Tracy, Joe Sawyer and Russell Hicks. Released by the low-budget Lippert Pictures, it is considered a B movie. It is one of eight films featuring Tracy as Sergeant Dorian "Dodo" Doubleday, and features footage from the production team's previous 1941 film Tanks a Million.

== Plot ==
An infusion of WAC beauties brings fun when ex-G.I. "Dodo" Doubleday, now a hotel clerk, impresses Army brass with his memory and considers reenlisting in the military. Recruiting sergeant Bill Ames, remembering how Tracy jinxed him during World War II, begs him not to reenlist.

== Cast ==
- William Tracy as Sgt. Dorian 'Dodo' Doubleday
- Joe Sawyer as Sgt. Ames
- Russell Hicks as Col. Lockwood
- John Ridgely as Captain
- Sondra Rodgers as WAC Captain
- Joan Vohs as Sgt. Peggy P. Hopper
- Edgar Dearing as Sgt. Monahan
- Chris Drake
- Ruth Lee
- Margie Liszt
- Roger McGee
- John Parrish
- Maris Wrixon
- Roland Morris as Soldier

== Production ==
Robert L. Lippert intended to produce a series of films with Hal Roach Jr.'s R and J Productions, including 12 films for television, and As You Were was their first collaboration. However, because of Lippert's difficulties with the Screen Actors Guild, only this film and Tales of Robin Hood were produced.

The film was originally titled Present Arms.

== Bibliography ==
- Clifford McCarty. Film Composers in America: A Filmography, 1911–1970. Oxford University Press, 2000.
