= William Tracy =

American actor (1917–1967)

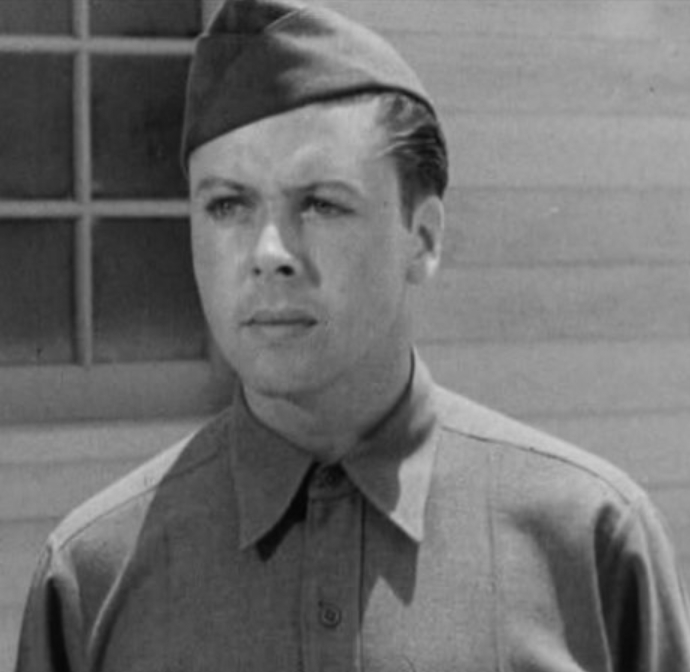
- Tracy in Tanks a Million (1941)
- Born: December 1, 1917; Pittsburgh, Pennsylvania, U.S.
- Died: July 18, 1967 (aged 49); Hollywood, California, U.S.
- Resting place: Valhalla Memorial Park Cemetery
- Occupation: Actor
- Years active: 1925–1964

William Tracy (December 1, 1917 – July 18, 1967) was an American character actor.

== Early life and career ==
Tracy was born in Pittsburgh, Pennsylvania.

He is perhaps best known for the role of Pepi Katona, the delivery boy, in The Shop Around the Corner (1940). He starred in the John Ford film Tobacco Road (1941), and appeared in Brother Rat (1938) and Alfred Hitchcock's Mr. and Mrs. Smith (1941).

In 1941, Tracy began a recurring role as Sgt. Dorian "Dodo" Doubleday in eight films teamed with Joe Sawyer as Sgt. Ames, the first six for Hal Roach's Streamliners service comedies, beginning with Tanks a Million (1941). This B-movie comedy was nominated for an Academy Award for Best Musical Score. In 1942, he starred alongside Randolph Scott, John Payne and Alan Hale Jr in To the Shores of Tripoli. Then back again as Sgt Doubleday for two more at Hal Roach studios and the last two were for Lippert Pictures, concluding with Mr. Walkie Talkie (1952) being set during the Korean War.

In the 1950s, Tracy primarily did television work, where his most notable role was "Hotshot Charlie" in the 1953 series Terry and the Pirates. He previously played the lead role of Terry Lee in the 1940 serial with the same title.

On the June 14, 1951, episode of the radio series Suspense, The Truth About Jerry Baxter, the 33-year-old Tracy played the title character, a teenage marijuana addict. The episode claimed to be drawn from actual events, but is more like a radio version of Reefer Madness.

He was married to actress Lois James from 1945 to 1954.

Tracy died in Hollywood, California, at the age of 49. He is interred in Valhalla Memorial Park Cemetery in North Hollywood, Los Angeles.

== Filmography ==
Year	Title	Role	Notes
1938	Brother Rat	Misto Bottome	
1938	Angels with Dirty Faces	Jerry - as a Boy	
1939	The Jones Family in Hollywood	Danny Regan	
1939	Million Dollar Legs	Egghead Jackson	
1939	The Amazing Mr. Williams	Messenger Boy	uncredited
1940	The Shop Around the Corner	Pepi Katona	
1940	Terry and the Pirates	Terry Lee	serial
1940	Strike Up the Band	Phillip Turner	
1940	Gallant Sons	'Beefy' Monrose	
1941	Mr. and Mrs. Smith	Sammy	
1941	Tobacco Road	Dude Lester	
1941	Her First Beau	Mervyn Roberts	
1941	She Knew All the Answers	Benny	
1941	Tillie the Toiler	Mac	
1941	Tanks a Million	1st Sgt. Dorian 'Dodo' Doubleday	
1941	Cadet Girl	The Runt, a Cadet	
1942	Hay Foot	Staff Sergeant 'Dodo' Doubleday	
1942	About Face	Staff Sergeant 'Dodo' Doubleday	
1942	Fall In	Staff Sergeant 'Dodo' Doubleday	
1942	Young America	Earl Tucker, alias Ivan Leslie	
1942	To the Shores of Tripoli	Johnny Dent	
1942	George Washington Slept Here	Steve Eldridge	
1943	Yanks Ahoy	Sergeant 'Dodo' Doubleday	
1948	Here Comes Trouble	Dorian 'Dodo' Doubleday	
1948	The Walls of Jericho	Cully Caxton	
1949	Henry, the Rainmaker	Charlie Richards	
1950	One Too Many	Billy Leighton	
1951	Sunny Side of the Street	Al Little	
1951	As You Were	Sgt. Dorian 'Dodo' Doubleday	
1952	Mr. Walkie Talkie	Sgt. Doubleday	
1957	The Wings of Eagles	Air Officer	uncredited
1959	-30-	Unnamed Writer	
