= Baby Sitters Jitters =

1951 film by Jules White

- Directed by: Jules White
- Written by: Felix Adler
- Produced by: Jules White
- Starring: Moe Howard; Larry Fine; Shemp Howard; Lynn Davis; David Windsor; Myron Healey; Margie Liszt
- Edited by: Edwin H. Bryant
- Distributed by: Columbia Pictures
- Release date: February 1, 1951 (U.S.)
- Running time: 16:08
- Country: United States
- Language: English

Baby Sitters Jitters is a 1951 short subject directed by Jules White starring American slapstick comedy team The Three Stooges (Moe Howard, Larry Fine and Shemp Howard). It is the 130th entry in the series released by Columbia Pictures starring the comedians, who released 190 shorts for the studio between 1934 and 1959.

== Plot ==
The Stooges, facing financial hardship due to rent arrears, reluctantly assume the role of babysitters for Junior Lloyd, under the guardianship of his mother, Joan Lloyd, who harbors fears of potential abduction by her estranged husband.

In their caretaking duties, Moe delegates kitchen responsibilities to Shemp, tasking him with the preparation of soup. However, Shemp's misinterpretation of the instructions leads to the incorporation of soap into the culinary concoction, resulting in an inedible mixture that induces illness and bubble-blowing in the Stooges. Subsequently, the trio succumbs to slumber, during which Junior is surreptitiously abducted by his father.

Upon awakening, the Stooges are alerted by Joan to Junior's disappearance and the open door, prompting their mission to retrieve the child from his father's residence. Amidst the ensuing commotion, the Stooges encounter physical altercation, enduring foot injuries inflicted by a hammer-wielding Junior and receiving blows from Joan's ex-husband. Eventually, Joan intervenes, facilitating reconciliation between herself and her estranged spouse.

== Cast ==
- Moe Howard as Moe
- Larry Fine as Larry
- Shemp Howard as Shemp
- Lynn Davis as Joan Lloyd
- David Windsor as Junior
- Myron Healey as George Lloyd
- Margie Liszt as Mrs. Crump

== Production notes ==
Baby Sitters Jitters was filmed over four days on January 23–26, 1950.

When Junior hits Shemp in the foot with a ball-peen hammer, he hits his right foot, but as Shemp hobbles around in pain, he clutches his left foot.
