= Here Comes Trouble (1948 film) =

1948 film by Fred Guiol

- Theatrical release poster
- Directed by: Fred Guiol
- Screenplay by: George Carleton Brown; Edward E. Seabrook
- Produced by: Fred Guiol
- Starring: William Tracy; Joe Sawyer; Emory Parnell; Betty Compson; Joan Woodbury
- Cinematography: John W. Boyle
- Edited by: Art Seid
- Music by: Heinz Roemheld
- Production company: Hal Roach Studios
- Distributed by: United Artists
- Release date: March 15, 1948
- Running time: 55 minutes
- Country: United States
- Language: English

Here Comes Trouble is a 1948 American comedy film in the Hal Roach's Streamliners series. It was produced and directed by Fred Guiol and written by George Carleton Brown and Edward E. Seabrook. The film stars William Tracy, Joe Sawyer, Emory Parnell, Betty Compson (in her final film) and Joan Woodbury. It was released on March 15, 1948 by United Artists.

== Plot ==
Returning home from his army service in the Pacific, Dodo Doubleday resumes his former job as a copy boy at a newspaper. Dodo's girlfriend Penny Blake is determined to have her father, the editor of the newspaper, promote Dodo to a job with a salary that will allow them to afford to marry. However, her father "Windy" Blake detests Dodo and wants Penny to marry someone of her own social standing. After a quarter of the paper's police reporters are beaten up by gangsters and leave town, Windy sees the answer to his problems by promoting Dodo to police reporter.

Reporting to the police station on his first day on the job, Dodo meets his old Sergeant Ames who is now a uniformed police officer on his own first day on the force. The pair team up to break up the organized crime ring that leads to double crossing, blackmail, murder and a frantic chase in a house of burlesque.

== Cast ==
- William Tracy as Dorian 'Dodo' Doubleday
- Joe Sawyer as Officer Ames
- Emory Parnell as Winfield 'Windy' Blake
- Betty Compson as Martha Blake
- Joan Woodbury as Bubbles LaRue
- Paul Stanton as Attorney Martin Stafford
- Beverly Lloyd as Penny Blake
- Patti Morgan as Ester Dexter
- E. Jackson as Chief McClure
- Joseph Granby as Spinelli, Rankin's Lawyer (uncredited)
