= Mr. Walkie Talkie =

1952 American film

- Directed by: Fred Guiol
- Written by: George Carleton Brown; Edward E. Seabrook
- Produced by: Hal Roach Jr.
- Starring: William Tracy; Joe Sawyer; Margia Dean
- Cinematography: Walter Strenge
- Edited by: S. Roy Luby
- Music by: Leon Klatzkin
- Production company: Rockingham Pictures
- Distributed by: Lippert Pictures
- Release date: November 28, 1952
- Running time: 65 minutes
- Country: United States
- Language: English

Mr. Walkie Talkie is a 1952 American comedy film directed by Fred Guiol and starring William Tracy, Joe Sawyer and Margia Dean. Released by Lippert Pictures, it is the final film in Hal Roach's series of military comedy films featuring the characters of Doubleday and Ames.

== Cast ==
- William Tracy as Sgt. Doubleday
- Joe Sawyer as Sgt. Ames
- Margia Dean as Entertainer
- Robert Shayne as Capt. Burke
- Alan Hale Jr. as Tiny
- Russell Hicks as Col. Lockwood
- Frank Jenks as Jackson
- Wong Artarne as Lt. Kim
- Hanna Hertelendy as Jane Winters
- Dorothy Neumann as Nina Crockett
- Tom Hubbard as Jay
- Kay Medford as Marge

== Reception ==
In the New York Daily News, critic Dorothy Masters wrote: "A second generation of movie-makers is represented in 'Mr. Walkie Talkie.' ... There is not much indication that the movies are growing up, however. ... The comedy is as broad as the screen will accommodate and is highlighted by the non-com's acquisition of a duck."
