= List of Racket Squad episodes =

This is a list of episodes for the television series Racket Squad.

== Series overview ==
Season	Episodes	Originally released	
Season	Episodes	First released	Last released
1	13	June 7, 1951	August 30, 1951
2	50	September 6, 1951	August 28, 1952
3	35	September 4, 1952	September 7, 1953

== Episodes ==
=== Season 1 (1951) ===
No. overall	No. in season	Title	Directed by	Written by	Original release date
1	1	"Don't Be a Sucker"	James Tinling	Arthur Orloff and Charles Shows	June 7, 1951
2	2	"The Case of the Slightly Used Car"	James Tinling	Charles Shows	June 14, 1951
3	3	"Big Punch"	James Tinling	Charles Shows	June 21, 1951
4	4	"The Case of the Two Little Country Girls"	James Tinling	Arthur Orloff and Charles Shows	June 28, 1951
5	5	"Heaven for Sale"	James Tinling	Ben Markson	July 5, 1951
6	6	"The Case of the Spanish Prisoner"	James Tinling	Charles Shows	July 12, 1951
7	7	"The Case of the Not-So-Old Masters"	James Tinling	Charles Shows	July 19, 1951
8	8	"The Fabulous Mr. James"	James Tinling	Arthur Orloff and Charles Shows	July 26, 1951
9	9	"The Case of Just a Little Larceny"	James Tinling	Charles Shows	August 2, 1951
10	10	"The Diamond That Wasn't"	James Tinling	Charles Shows	August 9, 1951
11	11	"The Starmaker"	James Tinling	Charles Shows	August 16, 1951
12	12	"Night Bank"	James Tinling	Charles Shows	August 23, 1951
13	13	"The Case of the Perpetual Pellet"	James Tinling	Robert C. Dennis	August 30, 1951

=== Season 2 (1951–52) ===
No. overall	No. in season	Title	Directed by	Written by	Original release date
14	1	"Kite High"	William Beaudine	Charles Belden	September 6, 1951
15	2	"Sick Old Man"	Unknown	Unknown	September 13, 1951
16	3	"The Case of the Miracle Mud"	William Asher	Lee Loeb	September 20, 1951
17	4	"Skin Game"	Unknown	Unknown	September 27, 1951
18	5	"The Raccoon Hunt"	George Blair	Giovanni Bello	October 4, 1951
19	6	"The Case of the Old Flame"	George Blair	George Bricker	October 11, 1951
20	7	"Big Secret"	Unknown	Unknown	October 18, 1951
21	8	"The Perfect Match"	James Tinling	Don Martin	October 25, 1951
22	9	"Two for One"	James Tinling	Ty Cobb and Jack Laird	November 1, 1951
23	10	"Babies for Sale"	George Blair	Erna Lazarus	November 8, 1951
24	11	"The Salted Mine"	George Blair	Giovanni Bello	November 15, 1951
25	12	"The Case of the Vain Woman"	George Blair	Unknown	November 22, 1951
26	13	"The Bill of Sale Racket"	James Tinling	Ben Markson	November 29, 1951
27	14	"Five Star Swindle"	Unknown	Unknown	December 6, 1951
28	15	"The Case of the Widow's Mite"	James Tinling	Unknown	December 13, 1951
29	16	"The Case of the Condemned Cattle"	George Blair	R. Steward and M. Randall	December 20, 1951
30	17	"The Knockout"	George Blair	Arthur Orloff	December 27, 1951
31	18	"Accidentally on Purpose"	George Blair	Edward Haldeman	January 3, 1952
32	19	"Romance Market"	Unknown	Unknown	January 10, 1952
33	20	"Big Trap"	James Tinling	Unknown	January 17, 1952
34	21	"Desperate Money"	James Tinling	Erna Lazarus	January 24, 1952
35	22	"Three Ring Circus"	William Beaudine	Unknown	January 31, 1952
36	23	"One Angle Too Many"	Erle C. Kenton	Muriel Roy Bolton	February 7, 1952
37	24	"Fair Exchange"	William Beaudine	Unknown	February 14, 1952
38	25	"The Case of No Questions Asked"	Howard Bretherton	Erna Lazarus	February 21, 1952
39	26	"The Case of the Hearse Chasers"	James Tinling	Richard Carr and Jerome S. Gottler	February 28, 1952
40	27	"C.O.D. Honeymoon"	Unknown	Unknown	March 6, 1952
41	28	"The Home Wreckers"	James Tinling	Ben Markson and Julian Harmon	March 13, 1952
42	29	"The Case of the Matchmaker"	Paul Guilfoyle	Herbert Moulton	March 25, 1952
43	30	"The Staff of Life"	James Tinling	Edward Haldeman	March 27, 1952
44	31	"The Case of the Cold Neck"	William Beaudine	Unknown	April 3, 1952
45	32	"The Phantom Bible"	William Beaudine	Unknown	April 10, 1952
46	33	"The Case of the Empty House"	Unknown	Unknown	April 17, 1952
47	34	"Serenade for a Sucker"	Unknown	Arthur Orloff	April 24, 1952
48	35	"The Soft Touch"	George Blair	Charles Belden	May 1, 1952
49	36	"Small Town Racket"	Erle C. Kenton	Edward Haldeman	May 8, 1952
50	37	"One for the Books"	George Blair	Muriel Roy Bolton	May 15, 1952
51	38	"Shakedown"	Unknown	Unknown	May 22, 1952
52	39	"The Fabulous Fraud"	Unknown	Unknown	May 29, 1952
53	40	"The Case of the Frightened Man"	Unknown	Unknown	June 5, 1952
54	41	"A Place for Grandma"	James Flood	Erna Lazarus	June 12, 1952
55	42	"Money to Burn"	Unknown	Arthur Orloff	June 19, 1952
56	43	"Blood Money"	James Flood	George Carleton Brown and Edward E. Seabrook	June 26, 1952
57	44	"The Long Shot"	Erle C. Kenton	George Carleton Brown and Edward E. Seabrook	July 3, 1952
58	45	"The Con Gambit"	Erle C. Kenton	Will Gould	July 17, 1952
59	46	"Anyone Can Be a Sucker"	James Flood	Warren Wilson	July 31, 1952
60	47	"The Strange Case of James Doyle"	James Flood	Arthur Orloff	August 7, 1952
61	48	"Pick a Number"	James Flood	Charles Belden	August 14, 1952
62	49	"The Family Tree"	Erle C. Kenton	Jackson Gillis	August 21, 1952
63	50	"One More Dream"	Erle C. Kenton	Will Gould	August 28, 1952

=== Season 3 (1952–53) ===
No. overall	No. in season	Title	Directed by	Written by	Original release date
64	1	"Check and Double Check"	George Blair	Jerome S. Gottler	September 4, 1952
65	2	"Heartbreak for Sale"	William Beaudine	Francis Rosenwald	September 11, 1952
66	3	"Charge It, Please"	William Asher	Unknown	September 18, 1952
67	4	"A Letter from Tessie"	William Beaudine	Unknown	September 25, 1952
68	5	"The Expensive Tumble"	James Tinling	Unknown	October 2, 1952
69	6	"Beauty for Hire"	Erle C. Kenton	Dean Riesner	October 9, 1952
70	7	"The Suit Club"	James Flood	Will Gould	October 23, 1952
71	8	"The Front Man"	William Beaudine	Arthur Orloff	October 30, 1952
72	9	"At Your Service"	James Tinling	Unknown	November 6, 1952
73	10	"The Label Switchers"	George Blair	Unknown	November 13, 1952
74	11	"Blessed Expense"	Erle C. Kenton	Jackson Gillis	November 20, 1952
75	12	"Strictly Legal"	George Blair	Unknown	November 27, 1952
76	13	"The Elephant in Stockings"	James Flood	Jackson Gillis	December 12, 1952
77	14	"False Tape"	James Tinling	Unknown	December 18, 1952
78	15	"The Christmas Caper"	Erle C. Kenton	Arthur Orloff	December 25, 1952
79	16	"The System"	Erle C. Kenton	Hendrik Vollaerts	January 1, 1953
80	17	"Baby Face Con"	William Beaudine	Unknown	January 9, 1953
81	18	"The Case of the Dancing Lady"	Erle C. Kenton	Lee Loeb	February 12, 1953
82	19	"His Brother's Keeper"	Howard Bretherton	Marianne Mosner and Francis Rosenwald	February 26, 1953
83	20	"Friend of the People"	George Blair	Unknown	March 12, 1953
84	21	"Antique Racket"	George Blair	Arthur Orloff	March 19, 1953
85	22	"Girl in the Mink Coat"	William Beaudine	Unknown	April 9, 1953
86	23	"The Big Touch"	William Beaudine	Unknown	April 23, 1953
87	24	"The White Carnation"	William Beaudine	Arthur Orloff	June 18, 1953
88	25	"Take a Little, Leave a Little"	Earl C. Kenton, James Tinling (Uncredited)	Edward Haldeman	July 2, 1953
89	26	"The Case of Lady Luck"	Harve Foster	Howard Greene	July 6, 1953
90	27	"The Gentler Sex"	George Blair	Dwight V. Babcock	July 13, 1953
91	28	"Sale Value"	Paul Guilfoyle	Lewis Glass	July 20, 1953
92	29	"Phony Photo Contest"	William Beaudine	Unknown	July 27, 1953
93	30	"Fraudulent Nursery School"	George Blair	Unknown	August 3, 1953
94	31	"Romance Unlimited"	Paul Guilfoyle	Herbert Moulton	August 10, 1953
95	32	"Impatient Heir"	Paul Guilfoyle	Giovanni Bello	August 17, 1953
96	33	"Diamond Smugglers"	Harve Foster	Unknown	August 24, 1953
97	34	"Sting of Fate"	Arnold Laven	David Dortort	August 31, 1953
98	35	"The Sure Thing"	Frank McDonald	Arthur Orloff	September 7, 1953
