= Fifi Blows Her Top =

1958 film by Jules White

- Directed by: Jules White
- Written by: Felix Adler
- Produced by: Jules White
- Starring: Moe Howard; Larry Fine; Joe Besser; Vanda Dupre; Philip Van Zandt; Joe Palma; Harriette Tarler; Heinie Conklin; Yvette Reynard; Al Thompson; Marie Monteil; Christine McIntyre
- Cinematography: Henry Freulich
- Edited by: Saul A. Goodkind
- Distributed by: Columbia Pictures
- Release date: April 10, 1958 (U.S.)
- Running time: 16:22
- Country: United States
- Language: English

Fifi Blows Her Top is a 1958 short subject directed by Jules White starring American slapstick comedy team The Three Stooges (Moe Howard, Larry Fine and Joe Besser). It is the 184th entry in the series released by Columbia Pictures starring the comedians, who released 190 shorts for the studio between 1934 and 1959.

== Plot ==
The Stooges engage in nostalgic recollections of their romantic encounters during their service in Europe during the war. Following the conclusion of their reminiscences, they are astonished to learn that Joe's former paramour, Fifi, whom he had left behind in Paris, has taken up residence in the adjacent dwelling. However, complications arise as Fifi is now wedded to a malevolent, possessive, and unappreciative spouse.

In their characteristic manner, the Stooges inadvertently cause havoc, resulting in the ruination of Fifi's attire. A comedic mishap ensues when they attire her in pajamas, inadvertently prompting the arrival of her husband. Revealed to be a contemptible character, the husband's deplorable behavior prompts Fifi to rebuff him decisively upon overhearing his intentions to seek a new spouse. Subsequently, she reconciles with Joe, opting to return to his side.

== Cast ==
=== Credited ===
- Moe Howard as Moe
- Larry Fine as Larry
- Joe Besser as Joe
- Vanda Dupre as Fifi
- Philip Van Zandt as Mort, Fifi's husband
- Harriette Tarler as Parisian waitress
- Christine McIntyre as Katrina (stock footage)

=== Uncredited ===
- Joe Palma as Military Policeman
- Heinie Conklin as Bartender
- Yvette Reynard/Marie Monteil as Maria (stock footage)
- Al Thompson as Sleeping Man in Restaurant (stock footage)
- Jackie Kening Jr. as first male Cafe customer
- Harry Kening as second male Cafe customer
- Suzanne Ridgeway as female Cafe customer

== Production notes ==
Fifi Blows Her Top is primarily a reworking of Laurel and Hardy's Unaccustomed As We Are (1929) and Block-Heads (1938) while incorporating several stock scenes from the Stooges' Love at First Bite (1950). New footage was filmed over two days on February 12–13, 1957.

Fifi Blows Her Top marks the final appearance of longtime foil Philip Van Zandt. The actor committed suicide a year after filming wrapped and did not live to see its release.

== See also ==
- List of American films of 1958
