= Dick Wessel =

American actor (1913–1965)

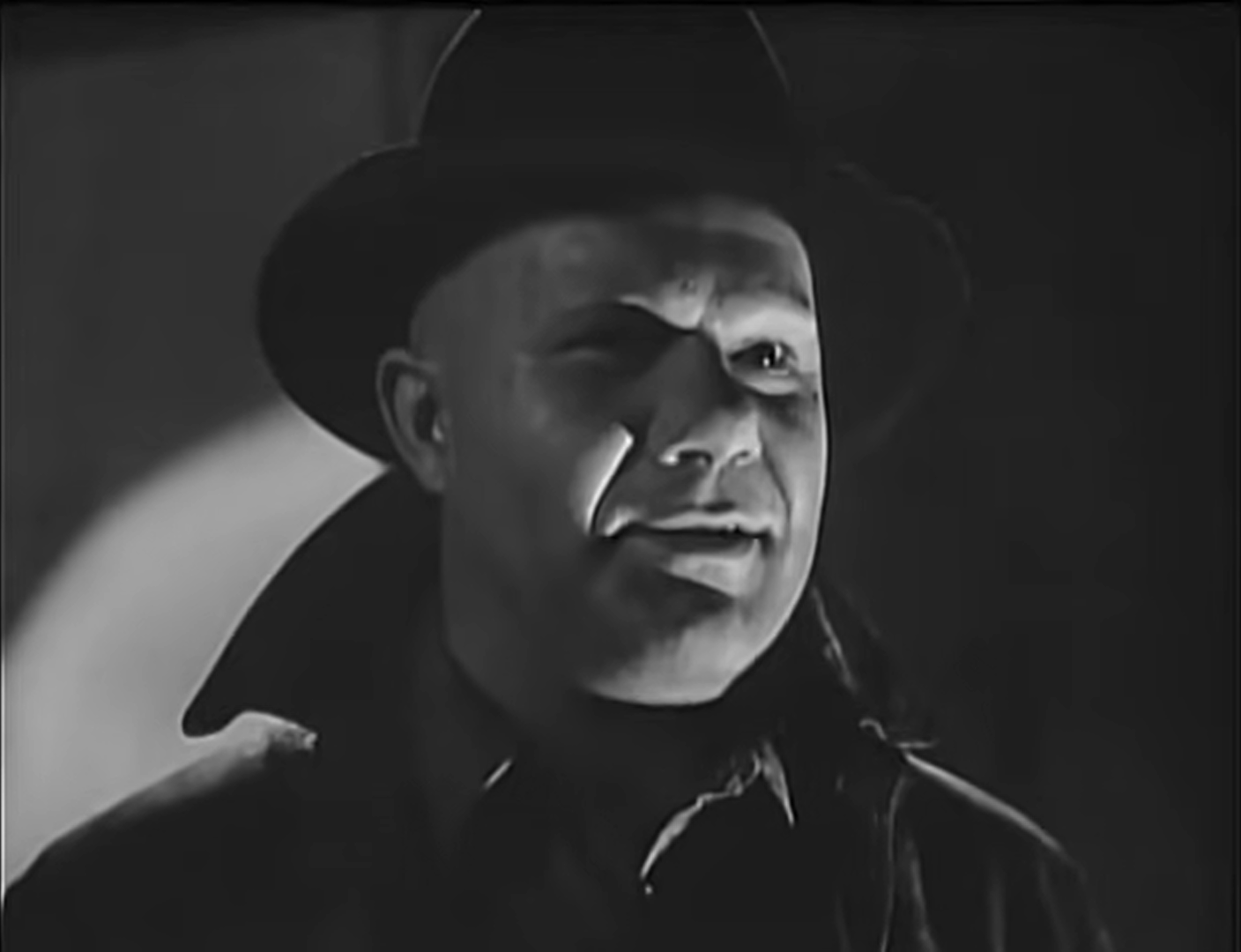
- Wessel in Dick Tracy vs. Cueball (1946)
- Born: Richard Michael Wessel; April 20, 1913; Milwaukee, Wisconsin, U.S.
- Died: April 20, 1965 (aged 52); Studio City, Los Angeles, California, U.S.
- Occupation: Actor
- Years active: 1935–1965
- Children: 1

Richard Michael Wessel (April 20, 1913 – April 20, 1965) was an American film actor who appeared in more than 270 films between 1935 and 1966. He is best remembered for his only leading role, a chilling portrayal of strangler Harry "Cueball" Lake in Dick Tracy vs. Cueball (1946), and for his appearances as comic villains opposite The Three Stooges.

== Biography ==
Wessel was born in Milwaukee, Wisconsin. His burly frame established him as a character player in feature films of the 1930s and '40s. At first he was a bit player; in Laurel and Hardy's Bonnie Scotland (1935), he was a blacksmith's assistant (with no dialogue). Gradually his roles became larger and he was given a few lines of dialogue, as in Yankee Doodle Dandy where he played a veteran soldier. His first featured roles came in 1941, for comedy producer Hal Roach.

In 1946, Dick Wessel began working in Columbia Pictures' two-reel comedies, often with writer-director Edward Bernds. Wessel became one of Bernds's favorites, and Bernds wrote his scripts with parts for Wessel in mind. Wessel became a fixture in Columbia shorts, as a comic foil for The Three Stooges, Andy Clyde, Hugh Herbert, Gus Schilling and Richard Lane, Sterling Holloway, Harry Von Zell, Billie Burke, and Eddie Foy, Jr. When character actor Eddie Acuff left the Blondie series, Bernds hired Dick Wessel to replace him as the hapless mailman perennially flattened by Dagwood Bumstead in his rush-hour run for the bus. In 1955 director Bernds remembered Wessel and wrote him into the Bowery Boys comedy Bowery to Bagdad.

Wessel continued to play character roles in feature films. In 1946 he landed his only leading role, as a villain opposite Morgan Conway's portrayal of Dick Tracy. Dick Tracy vs. Cueball casts Wessel as Cueball, ex-convict with shaven head, who steals valuable jewels and murders anyone in his way while he tries to reclaim them. Wessel is Mr Cracker, the affable bartender serving James Stewart in Harvey, 1950). In Frank Capra's comedy Pocketful of Miracles, based on a Damon Runyon story, he's a New York mug masquerading as the governor of Florida.

Wessel also appeared on television. From 1959 to 1961, Wessel co-starred as Carney Kohler in all forty-two episodes of the NBC western television series Riverboat. In 1959, he appeared as police captain Bob Rattigan in the episode "Rattigan and the Cat" of the syndicated Border Patrol series. He also appeared in the syndicated crime drama Sheriff of Cochise. He was cast as Charlie in the episode "A Kind of a Stopwatch" of CBS's The Twilight Zone. He also guest starred in the CBS sitcom/drama Hennesey and on the ABC sitcom, Our Man Higgins. In 1961 he guest-starred in the series finale of The Investigators.

Wessel and his wife, Louise, had a daughter. He died of a heart attack at his home in Studio City, California on his 52nd birthday.

== Selected filmography ==
- In Spite of Danger (1935) - Monk Grady
- Eight Bells (1935) - Bosun (uncredited)
- Bonnie Scotland (1935) - Blacksmith's Helper (uncredited)
- Half Shot Shooters (1936, Short) - Gunnery Soldier (uncredited)
- The Adventures of Frank Merriwell (1936, Serial) - Joe (uncredited)
- Small Town Girl (1936) - College Boy in Car (uncredited)
- Fury (1936) - Bodyguard (uncredited)
- The Gay Desperado (1936) - On-Screen Gangster (uncredited)
- Ace Drummond (1936, Serial) - Henchman Boris (uncredited)
- Round-Up Time in Texas (1937) - Henchman Craig Johnson
- They Gave Him a Gun (1937) - German Machine Gunner (uncredited)
- San Quentin (1937) - Trusty (uncredited)
- Border Cafe (1937) - Jaillbird (uncredited)
- Slim (1937) - Ed
- White Bondage (1937) - Beans Clerk (uncredited)
- The Game That Kills (1937) - 'Leapfrog' Soule
- Submarine D-1 (1937) - Sailor (uncredited)
- Borrowing Trouble (1937) - Joe
- Prescription for Romance (1937) - Sailor (uncredited)
- A Slight Case of Murder (1938) - Partygoer Popping Cork (uncredited)
- Over the Wall (1938) - Convict in Machine Shop with Gyp (uncredited)
- Arson Gang Busters (1938) - Slugs
- Yellow Jack (1938) - Cavalryman (uncredited)
- Racket Busters (1938) - Truck Driver (uncredited)
- The Crowd Roars (1938) - Fighter at Gym (uncredited)
- Submarine Patrol (1938) - Dock Shore Patrolman (uncredited)
- Angels with Dirty Faces (1938) - Man in Pool Room Slugged by Father Connelly (uncredited)
- Hawk of the Wilderness (1938, Serial) - Dirk - Henchman
- They Made Me a Criminal (1939) - Collucci
- Blackwell's Island (1939) - Convict (uncredited)
- The Kid from Kokomo (1939) - Shadowboxer (uncredited)
- Missing Daughters (1939) - Brick McGirk
- They All Come Out (1939) - Charles Moxley (uncredited)
- The Cowboy Quarterback (1939) - Gyp Galbraith - Packers Player (uncredited)
- I Stole a Million (1939) - 2nd Cop (uncredited)
- Dust Be My Destiny (1939) - Customer (uncredited)
- Hitler – Beast of Berlin (1939) - Buchman - Prison Guard (uncredited)
- The Roaring Twenties (1939) - Second Mechanic (uncredited)
- Main Street Lawyer (1939) - Gangster (uncredited)
- Cafe Hostess (1940) - Henchman Willie
- Castle on the Hudson (1940) - Convict Messenger (uncredited)
- Framed (1940) - Al (uncredited)
- Sandy Is a Lady (1940) - Truck Driver (uncredited)
- Brother Orchid (1940) - Buffalo Burns
- They Drive by Night (1940) - Driver in Café (uncredited)
- Flowing Gold (1940) - Man on Dance Floor (uncredited)
- The Howards of Virginia (1940) - Backwoodsman (uncredited)
- City for Conquest (1940) - Cab Driver by Fire (uncredited)
- So You Won't Talk (1940) - Dopey
- The Border Legion (1940) - Oscar Red McGooney
- Flight Command (1940) - Big Sailor on Downed Seaplane (uncredited)
- Lucky Devils (1941) - Simmons (uncredited)
- The Strawberry Blonde (1941) - Barber Shop Hanger-on (uncredited)
- The Great Train Robbery (1941) - Gorman
- Men of Boys Town (1941) - Husky Brother of Homely Girl at Dance (uncredited)
- Model Wife (1941) - Laundry Man (uncredited)
- Penny Serenade (1941) - Joe Connor, Man Dancing with Dotty (uncredited)
- The People vs. Dr. Kildare (1941) - Blood Donor (uncredited)
- Desert Bandit (1941) - Hawk - Henchman
- Manpower (1941) - Lineman at Cafe Counter (uncredited)
- Dive Bomber (1941) - Mechanic Who Helps Joe with Pressure Suit (uncredited)
- Tanks a Million (1941) - Pvt. Monkman
- Dangerous Lady (1941) - Officer Donahue (uncredited)
- Navy Blues (1941) - Petty Officer (uncredited)
- They Died with Their Boots On (1941) - Sgt. Brown (uncredited)
- Red River Valley (1941) - Lumber Deliverer (uncredited)
- Steel Against the Sky (1941) - Mike (uncredited)
- Dangerously They Live (1941) - Grant, Psychopathic Ward Guard (uncredited)
- You're in the Army Now (1941) - Supply Man - Shoes (uncredited)
- Hay Foot (1942) - Mailman (uncredited)
- The Bugle Sounds (1942) - Jerry - Saboteur (uncredited)
- Brooklyn Orchid (1942) - Al, Cab Driver (uncredited)
- Joe Smith, American (1942) - Aircraft Plant Worker (uncredited)
- About Face (1942, Short) - Bartender Charlie
- Sunday Punch (1942) - Maxie - Ken's Handler (uncredited)
- Romance on the Range (1942) - Jailer (uncredited)
- Yankee Doodle Dandy (1942) - Union Army Veteran #2 on Caisson (uncredited)
- Tarzan's New York Adventure (1942) - First Cab Driver (uncredited)
- Friendly Enemies (1942) - Delivery man
- Enemy Agents Meet Ellery Queen (1942) - The Big Sailor
- Sunset Serenade (1942) - Antlers Bartender (uncredited)
- Bells of Capistrano (1942) - Mug / Sign-Poster #2 (uncredited)
- Highways by Night (1942) - Waiter (uncredited)
- You Can't Escape Forever (1942) - Moxie - Greer's Henchman (uncredited)
- X Marks the Spot (1942) - Henchman Dizzy
- Gentleman Jim (1942) - Referee (uncredited)
- Fall In (1942) - Army Barber (uncredited)
- The Traitor Within (1942) - Henchman Otis
- The McGuerins from Brooklyn (1942) - Al - Cab Driver (uncredited)
- Assignment in Brittany (1943) - German Sergeant (uncredited)
- King of the Cowboys (1943) - Hershel (uncredited)
- A Gentle Gangster (1943) - Steve Parker
- Three Hearts for Julia (1943) - Soldier-Stage Manager (uncredited)
- Action in the North Atlantic (1943) - Cherub Joe (uncredited)
- False Faces (1943) - Detective Mallory
- Yanks Ahoy (1943) - Ship Cargo Seaman (uncredited)
- Silver Spurs (1943) - Buck Walters
- An American Romance (1944) - Baseball Game Spectator Behind Stefan (uncredited)
- Dakota (1945) - Roughneck in Saloon (uncredited)
- What Next, Corporal Hargrove? (1945) - Military Police Officer (uncredited)
- Scarlet Street (1945) - Detective (uncredited)
- Young Widow (1946) - Cab Driver (uncredited)
- Blonde Alibi (1946) - Detective (uncredited)
- In Old Sacramento (1946) - Oscar
- In Fast Company (1946) - Pete - Cabbie
- Black Angel (1946) - Mavis' Doorman (uncredited)
- Little Miss Big (1946) - Private Detective (uncredited)
- Pardon My Terror (1946, Short) - Luke
- No Leave, No Love (1946) - Navy Man at Union Station (uncredited)
- Slappily Married (1946, Short) - Eddie—Honey's Fiancé
- Dick Tracy vs. Cueball (1946) - Cueball
- Gallant Bess (1946) - Marine (uncredited)
- 13 Rue Madeleine (1946) - Gestapo Officer (uncredited)
- Blondie's Big Moment (1947) - Charlie - the Bus Driver (uncredited)
- California (1947) - Blacksmith (uncredited)
- Fright Night (1947, Short) - Chopper Kane
- It Happened in Brooklyn (1947) - Cop (uncredited)
- The Long Night (1947) - State Policeman (uncredited)
- The Millerson Case (1947) - Clem Ogle, Blacksmith (uncredited)
- Living in a Big Way (1947) - Sailor in Clothing Store (uncredited)
- Magic Town (1947) - Moving Man (uncredited)
- Merton of the Movies (1947) - Chick
- High Wall (1947) - Jim Hale (uncredited)
- Killer McCoy (1947) - Burns Sr. (uncredited)
- The Mating of Millie (1948) - Bus Driver (uncredited)
- Eight-Ball Andy (1948, Short) - Claude Beasley
- The Fuller Brush Man (1948) - Police Sergeant (uncredited)
- River Lady (1948) - Logger (uncredited)
- The Babe Ruth Story (1948) - First Mate (scenes deleted)
- A Southern Yankee (1948) - Hospital Orderly (uncredited)
- Pitfall (1948) - Desk Sergeant
- Hollow Triumph (1948) - Bullseye's Sidekick (uncredited)
- Good Sam (1948) - Melvin Z. Wurtzberger, the Bus Driver (uncredited)
- Unknown Island (1948) - Sanderson, 1st Mate
- When My Baby Smiles at Me (1948) - Sailor (uncredited)
- Bad Men of Tombstone (1949) - Bartender (uncredited)
- Take Me Out to the Ball Game (1949) - Umpire (uncredited)
- The Green Promise (1949) - Mr. Clairborne (uncredited)
- Tulsa (1949) - Joker (uncredited)
- Canadian Pacific (1949) - Bailey
- Slattery's Hurricane (1949) - Taxi Driver (uncredited)
- Blondie Hits the Jackpot (1949) - Mailman (uncredited)
- Thieves' Highway (1949) - Cab Driver (uncredited)
- On the Town (1949) - Sailor Kovarsky (uncredited)
- Sands of Iwo Jima (1949) - Grenade Instructor (uncredited)
- Punchy Cowpunchers (1950, Short) - Sgt. Mullins
- Key to the City (1950) - Washing Car in Hotel Basement (uncredited)
- The Kid from Texas (1950) - Deputy Bart, the Jailer (uncredited)
- Blondie's Hero (1950) - Mailman (uncredited)
- Wabash Avenue (1950) - John Electrician (uncredited)
- Beware of Blondie (1950) - Mailman
- Kill the Umpire (1950) - Catcher (uncredited)
- The Jackie Robinson Story (1950) - Tough Lodge Member in Stands (uncredited)
- Father of the Bride (1950) - Moving Man with Chandelier (uncredited)
- Love That Brute (1950) - Fats Leslie, Gangster (uncredited)
- He's a Cockeyed Wonder (1950) - Delivery Van Driver (uncredited)
- Frontier Outpost (1950) - Drill Sergeant (uncredited)
- Harvey (1950) - Mr. Cracker (uncredited)
- Watch the Birdie (1950) - Man Who Undresses (uncredited)
- The Misadventures of Buster Keaton (1950) - Harry (uncredited)
- Gasoline Alley (1951) - Pudge
- M (1951) - Policeman Ticketing Jaywalker (uncredited)
- The Scarf (1951) - Sid (uncredited)
- Francis Goes to the Races (1951) - Chuck (uncredited)
- Her First Romance (1951) - Night Watchman (uncredited)
- The Texas Rangers (1951) - Arkansas (uncredited)
- Strangers on a Train (1951) - Bill (uncredited)
- An American in Paris (1951) - Ben Macrow (uncredited)
- Flying Leathernecks (1951) - Mess Sergeant (uncredited)
- Corky of Gasoline Alley (1951) - Pudge McKay
- Texas Carnival (1951) - Concessionaire #1
- Reunion in Reno (1951) - Taxi Driver
- Honeychile (1951) - Bartender
- The Barefoot Mailman (1951) - Theron Henchman (uncredited)
- The Belle of New York (1952) - With Wedding Gift of Stolen Silver (uncredited)
- Love Is Better Than Ever (1952) - Smittie
- Rancho Notorious (1952) - Deputy (uncredited)
- Young Man with Ideas (1952) - Eddie Tasling
- Because You're Mine (1952) - Sgt. Grogan (uncredited)
- Just for You (1952) - Master Sergeant, Air Force Recruiter (uncredited)
- The WAC from Walla Walla (1952) - Sgt. Malone
- Blackbeard the Pirate (1952) - Dutchman
- The Lawless Breed (1953) - Marv (uncredited)
- Gentlemen Prefer Blondes (1953) - Chez Louis Nightclub Patron (uncredited)
- Let's Do It Again (1953) - Ajax Moving Man
- The Caddy (1953) - Caddy Who Rips Towel (uncredited)
- Champ for a Day (1953) - 'Speedtrap' Calhoun - Policeman
- Flight Nurse (1953) - Sergeant (uncredited)
- Untamed Heiress (1954) - Cruncher (uncredited)
- Them! (1954) - Railroad Detective (uncredited)
- Bowery to Bagdad (1955) - Gus
- Fling in the Ring (1955) - Chopper Kane (archive footage)
- The Eternal Sea (1955) - Mike, Rivet Tosser (uncredited)
- Francis in the Navy (1955) - Gas Station Attendant (uncredited)
- Rebel Without a Cause (1955) - Planetarium Guide (uncredited)
- Around the World in 80 Days (1956) - Train Engineer (uncredited)
- The Desperados Are in Town (1956) - Hank Green
- No Time for Sergeants (1958) - Drunk Infantryman at Purple Grotto (uncredited)
- The Gazebo (1959) - Louis the Louse
- All in a Night's Work (1961) - Janitor (uncredited)
- Pocketful of Miracles (1961) - Governor of Florida (uncredited)
- Wives and Lovers (1963) - Mr. Liberti
- Who's Minding the Store? (1963) - Traffic Cop
- The Ugly Dachshund (1966) - Eddie - Garbage Man (uncredited) (posthumous release; final film role)

== Television ==
Year 1959-1960	Title Riverboat (t.v. series)	Role (Karney Kohler) Engine Man	Notes
1961	Rawhide	Barker	S4:E4, "Judgement at Hondo Seco"
1963	Rawhide	Jed	S6:E10, "Incident at Confidence Creek"
1965	Gunsmoke	Sol Durham	S10:E34, "Honey Pot"
