= The Tooth Will Out =

1951 film by Edward Bernds

- Directed by: Edward Bernds
- Written by: Edward Bernds
- Produced by: Hugh McCollum
- Starring: Moe Howard; Larry Fine; Shemp Howard; Vernon Dent; Margie Liszt; Dick Curtis; Slim Gaut; Emil Sitka
- Distributed by: Columbia Pictures
- Release date: October 4, 1951 (U.S.)
- Running time: 15:59
- Country: United States
- Language: English

The Tooth Will Out is a 1951 short subject directed by Edward Bernds starring American slapstick comedy team The Three Stooges (Moe Howard, Larry Fine and Shemp Howard). It is the 134th entry in the series released by Columbia Pictures starring the comedians, who released 190 shorts for the studio between 1934 and 1959.

== Plot ==
Following dismissal from two previous occupations due to dish-breaking incidents in a dish shop and restaurant, the Stooges find themselves pursued by an irate chef wielding a cleaver, leading them to seek refuge in a dental office. Subsequently, the trio endeavors to pursue a career in dentistry, culminating in their graduation from dental school under the auspices of Dr. Keefer, Professor of Dentistry.

Their inaugural venture as practicing dentists leads them to a tranquil western town, where their initial patient presents with a minor tooth ailment. Despite their best efforts, Dr. Shemp's misguided treatment results in unintended consequences, including the emission of smoke from the patient's mouth.

Their professional endeavors are further complicated when an agitated individual, purporting to be the Sheriff, seeks dental assistance for a severe toothache. Amidst mounting pressure, Shemp inadvertently consults the wrong instructional manual, namely The Amateur Carpenter in lieu of the appropriate reference material, How to Be a Dentist, thereby precipitating the adoption of inappropriate and unsuitable treatment methods. Despite rectifying their approach, a mishap ensues during the tooth extraction procedure, exacerbating the situation and prompting the Sheriff to resort to drastic measures, culminating in a confrontation between the Stooges and the law enforcement authority.

== Cast ==
- Moe Howard as Moe
- Larry Fine as Larry
- Shemp Howard as Shemp
- Vernon Dent as Dr. Keefer, Professor of Dentistry
- Margie Liszt as Miss Beebe, Dr. Keefer's assistant
- Dick Curtis as the town sheriff (second patient)
- Slim Gaut as first patient
- Emil Sitka as Vesuvius chef

== Production notes ==
The Tooth Will Out was filmed on February 19–20, 1951. The film's title parodies the proverbial expression "The truth will out."

The second half of this film, consisting of the dentist office scene, was originally filmed seven months earlier in June 1950 for inclusion in the previous entry, Merry Mavericks. However, the scene ran too long and had to be excised from the final cut. Rather than disposing of the surplus dentist footage, the story line of The Tooth Will Out was built around it.

This was the last film to feature longtime Stooge supporting actor, Dick Curtis, who died of pneumonia brought on by lung cancer in January 1952. The voice from the living set of dentures is Vernon Dent.
