= Margie Liszt =

American actress (1909–1992)

- Margie Liszt in the Three Stooges film Pest Man Wins (1951)
- Born: March 2, 1909; New York City, New York, U.S.
- Died: August 24, 1992 (aged 83); Laguna Hills, California, U.S.
- Occupations: Radio, film, television actress
- Years active: 1943-1964

Margie Liszt (March 2, 1909 – August 24, 1992) was an American actress of radio, stage, films, and television. She is remembered by today's audiences for her appearances in I Love Lucy and several Three Stooges comedies. She was a great-granddaughter of composer Franz Liszt.

== Radio ==
During the 1940s Margie Liszt was a busy radio comedienne. In 1943 she was featured on the Al Pearce radio show Here Comes Elmer. That August she joined a group of performers for a USO camp show at Catalina Island, headed by comedian Gil Lamb. She also spent nine months in the Aleutian Islands while on tour.

In October 1947 she took over the role of "Miss Duffy" on Duffy's Tavern, replacing Helen Eley (who had replaced Sandra Gould). Liszt herself was replaced a month later by Florence Halop. She continued to appear on network radio into the 1950s, working with Fibber McGee and Molly in 1955.

== Motion pictures ==
In 1948 film producers Nat Finston and Ted Reed formed Symphony Films and signed Margie Liszt to appear "in a leading role" for a film biography of Franz Liszt. The film was never made, and the producers instead mounted a biography of Tchaikovsky, Song of My Heart (1948).

Jules White, who produced short comedy films for Columbia Pictures, often scouted talent from radio (Vera Vague, Harry Von Zell, Jim Hawthorne, etc.). In 1949 he hired Margie Liszt to appear in his two-reel slapstick comedies. White emphasized violent, physical comedy in the shorts he directed, and while male performers were accustomed to taking physical punishment in the films, White seldom found female performers who were comfortable with the format. Liszt proved an enthusiastic participant, mugging her way through slapstick antics with The Three Stooges, Andy Clyde, Bert Wheeler, Vera Vague, Wally Vernon & Eddie Quillan, and Gus Schilling & Richard Lane. Liszt occasionally wore a mouthpiece of protruding buck teeth for comic effect in these shorts. She remained with Columbia through 1954.

== Television ==
In 1953 she joined the cast of I Married Joan with Joan Davis. TV programs on which Liszt appeared included The Donna Reed Show, The Eleventh Hour (in which she played the family housekeeper), and Alfred Hitchcock Presents. She also appeared on the Pinky Lee TV show.

She worked steadily in television until her retirement in 1964. In 1992 she died of colon cancer at the age of 83 in Laguna Hills, California.

== Selected filmography ==
- Life with Blondie (1945)
- Blondie's Lucky Day (1946)
- Side Street (1950)
- The Tooth Will Out (1951)
- Baby Sitters Jitters (1951)
- As You Were (1951)
- Grounds for Marriage (1951)
- Cause for Alarm! (1951)
- Valley of Fire (1951)
- We're Not Married! (1952)
- Income Tax Sappy (1954)
- Deep in My Heart (1954)
- Rawhide TV series, (1959-1965)
- Rawhide (1961) – Townswoman in S3:E21, "Incident of His Brother's Keeper"
- Two Weeks in Another Town (1962)
- The Courtship of Eddie's Father (1963)
- Johnny Cool (1963)
