= Slim Gaut =

American actor (1893–1964)

- Born: Louis H. Gaut; July 8, 1893; Lewiston, Idaho; U.S.
- Died: April 17, 1964 (aged 70); Los Angeles, California; U.S.
- Years active: 1940-1956

Slim Gaut (July 8, 1893 – April 17, 1964) was an American film actor, born in Lewiston, Idaho. He appeared, unusually uncredited, in over 15 films between 1940 and 1956.

Modern viewers may recognize Gaut as Shemp Howard's first dental patient in the film The Tooth Will Out.

Gaut died in Los Angeles, California on April 17, 1964.
