= About Face (1942 film) =

1942 film

- Directed by: Kurt Neumann
- Screenplay by: Eugene Conrad; Edward E. Seabrook
- Produced by: Hal Roach; Fred Guiol
- Starring: William Tracy; Joe Sawyer; Jean Porter; Marjorie Lord; Margaret Dumont; Veda Ann Borg; Joe Cunningham
- Cinematography: Paul Ivano
- Edited by: Bert Jordan
- Music by: Edward Ward
- Production company: Hal Roach Studios
- Distributed by: United Artists
- Release date: April 16, 1942
- Running time: 43 minutes
- Country: United States
- Language: English

About Face is a 1942 American comedy film directed by Kurt Neumann and written by Eugene Conrad and Edward E. Seabrook. The film is the third of the Hal Roach's Streamliners Army film series with stars William Tracy and Joe Sawyer. The film also features Jean Porter, Marjorie Lord, Margaret Dumont, Veda Ann Borg and Joe Cunningham. The film was released on April 16, 1942, by United Artists.

== Plot ==
Sgt. Ames is always broke and owing money to his comrades-in-arms. When his biggest enemy, Dodo, wins a large amount of money in a contest, Ames schemes to have Dodo pay for a night on the town with girls and a rented automobile. Things turn into a violent night of fights and car wrecking.

== Cast ==
- William Tracy as S/Sgt. Dorian 'Dodo' Doubleday
- Joe Sawyer as Sgt. William Ames
- Jean Porter as Sally
- Marjorie Lord as Betty Marlowe
- Margaret Dumont as Mrs. Culpepper
- Veda Ann Borg as Daisy, Blonde Hustler
- Joe Cunningham as Col. Gunning
- Harold Goodwin as Capt. Caldwell
- Frank Faylen as Bartender Jerry
- Dick Wessel as Bartender Charlie
- Charles Lane as Rental Car Manager
