= Edward E. Seabrook =

American screenwriter

Edward Evans Seabrook
- Born: June 6, 1899; Portland, Oregon, United States
- Died: May 19, 1968 (aged 68); Europe
- Occupation: Writer
- Years active: 1941 - 1958 (film & TV)

Edward Evans Seabrook (June 6, 1899 – May 19, 1968) was an American screenwriter.

He was born June 6, 1899 in Portland, Oregon to the Portland attorney Ephraim B. and Margaret (née McClure) Seabrook.

He was named after his grandfather, Edward Evans McClure, who was in turn named after his own grandfather, the Reverend Edward Evans Parrish.

He married the actress Gay Seabrook, née Johnson, in 1920.

Edward and Gay filed for divorce in September 1935. He subsequently married Ruth May Christiansen on October 4, 1935, in Hollywood, California.

== Selected filmography ==
- Tanks a Million (1941)
- Miss Polly (1941)
- Hay Foot (1942)
- Abroad with Two Yanks (1944)
- As You Were (1951)
- Mr. Walkie Talkie (1952)

== Selected television series ==
- Racket Squad (1952)
- The Public Defender (1954)
- My Little Margie (1954)
- The Stu Erwin Show (1954)
- Lassie (1957–1958)
- Maverick (1958)
- The New Adventures of Charlie Chan (1958)
- The Alaskans (1960)

== Bibliography ==
- Erickson, Hal. Military Comedy Films: A Critical Survey and Filmography of Hollywood Releases Since 1918. McFarland, 2012.
