= Public Defender (TV series) =

American TV legal drama series (1954–1955)

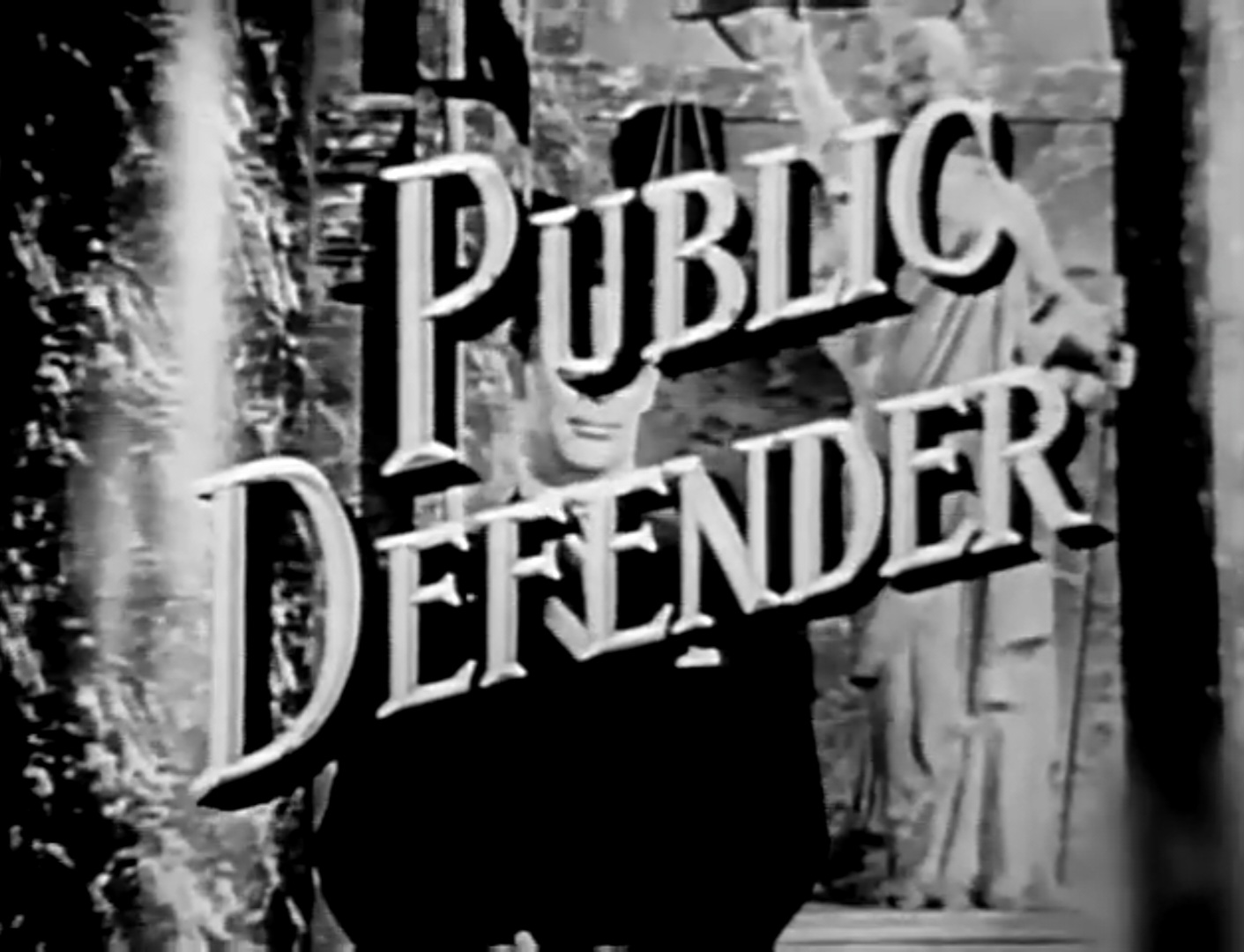
- Created by: Mort Lewis; Sam Shayon
- Directed by: Budd Boetticher
- Starring: Reed Hadley
- Country of origin: United States
- No. of seasons: 2
- No. of episodes: 69

Production
- Producer: Carroll Case
- Production company: Hal Roach Studios

Original release
- Network: CBS
- Release: March 11, 1954 – June 23, 1955

Public Defender is an American legal drama television series that was broadcast on CBS from March 11, 1954, to June 23, 1955.

== Premise ==
Reed Hadley had the title role of public defender Bart Matthews. Each episode opened with him in a courtroom setting explaining the role of a public defender and the increase in the number of public defenders from the first one (created in January 1913). In each episode, Matthews sought to show that his client was not guilty or to at least obtain a shorter sentence if the person were guilty. He sometimes had to investigate to learn more facts about the client's situation. Hadley portrayed Matthews as "such a character as butter will not melt in his mouth. His hollow eyes and sepulchral voice are enlisted in the defense of parties at odds with the law by force of circumstances."

Episodes were adapted from actual cases that occurred across the United States when people accused of crimes who could not afford an attorney were provided with one at no charge to them. Matthews defended clients whose crimes ranged from bullying and hazing in schools to murder. Some of them ended up going to jail, while some who were guilty avoided punishment. Producer Hal Roach Jr. initially was concerned that the series might encounter a shortage of ideas for stories, but as it progressed, "a rich vein of dramatic material" was found to be available.

At the end of each episode, a real-life public defender was recognized for outstanding work in that profession.

== Community involvement ==
Members of the public sometimes contacted Hadley, requesting his help with legal matters. He received 30 requests of that type per week when the show was most popular. Edward N. Bliss Jr. of the Los Angeles County Public Defender's Office, who was the series's technical advisor, and Hadley traveled around the United States for 20 days in early 1955 speaking to groups of people about the work of public defenders and advocating the creation of additional public defenders' offices.

== Cast ==
- Reed Hadley as Bart Matthew

== Episodes ==
=== Season 1 (1954) ===
No. overall	No. in season	Title	Directed by	Written by	Original release date
1	1	"The Case of the Parolee"	Erle C. Kenton	Howard J. Green	March 11, 1954
2	2	"The Unfit Mother"	Unknown	Unknown	March 18, 1954
3	3	"Lost Cause"	Unknown	Unknown	March 25, 1954
4	4	"The Forger"	James Tinling	Marianne Mosner	April 1, 1954
5	5	"The Prize Fighter Story"	Budd Boetticher	Unknown	April 8, 1954
6	6	"The Clown"	Erle C. Kenton	Jerry D. Lewis	April 15, 1954
7	7	"Behind Bars"	Unknown	Unknown	April 22, 1954
8	8	"Two Brothers"	Unknown	Unknown	April 29, 1954
9	9	"Badge of Honor"	Unknown	Unknown	May 6, 1954
10	10	"Let Justice Be Done"	Unknown	Unknown	May 13, 1954
11	11	"Pauper's Gold"	Unknown	Unknown	May 20, 1954
12	12	"Step Child"	Budd Boetticher	Marianne Mosner	May 27, 1954
13	13	"Auto Accident"	Unknown	Unknown	June 3, 1954
14	14	"Confession of Guilt"	Unknown	Unknown	June 10, 1954
15	15	"Hobo Story"	Unknown	Unknown	June 17, 1954
16	16	"The Modern Fagin"	Unknown	Unknown	June 24, 1954
17	17	"Third Floor Rear"	Unknown	Unknown	July 1, 1954
18	18	"Out of the Past"	Unknown	Unknown	July 8, 1954
19	19	"A Call in the Night"	Budd Boetticher	David Dortort	July 15, 1954
20	20	"Escape"	Unknown	Unknown	July 19, 1954
21	21	"High Stakes"	Unknown	Unknown	July 26, 1954
22	22	"Lisa"	Unknown	Unknown	August 2, 1954
23	23	"Baby for Sale"	Unknown	Unknown	August 9, 1954
24	24	"Think No Evil"	Budd Boetticher	Unknown	August 16, 1954
25	25	"Little Egypt"	Erle C. Kenton	John Tucker Battle	August 23, 1954
26	26	"The Last Appeal"	Budd Boetticher	Donald S. Stanford	August 30, 1954

=== Season 2 (1954–55) ===
No. overall	No. in season	Title	Directed by	Written by	Original release date
27	1	"Return of the Dead"	Unknown	Unknown	September 6, 1954
28	2	"Road to Nowhere"	Unknown	Unknown	September 13, 1954
29	3	"The Big Race"	Harve Foster	William E. Raynor	September 20, 1954
30	4	"The Fire Bell"	Unknown	Unknown	September 27, 1954
31	5	"Bertha Polaski"	Unknown	Unknown	September 30, 1954
32	6	"The Do-Gooder"	Unknown	Unknown	October 7, 1954
33	7	"Where Credit is Due"	Unknown	Unknown	October 14, 1954
34	8	"Crash Out"	Erle C. Kenton	Al C. Ward	October 21, 1954
35	9	"Destiny"	Erle C. Kenton	Frank L. Moss	October 28, 1954
36	10	"Hot Rod"	Harve Foster	Edward E. Seabrook and Homer McCoy	November 4, 1954
37	11	"Color Blind"	Erle C. Kenton	Jerry D. Lewis	November 11, 1954
38	12	"Hijacked Truck"	Unknown	Unknown	November 18, 1954
39	13	"Circumstantial Evidence"	Unknown	Unknown	November 25, 1954
40	14	"Murder Photo"	Unknown	Unknown	December 2, 1954
41	15	"Open Season"	Unknown	Unknown	December 9, 1954
42	16	"Socrates"	Unknown	Unknown	December 16, 1954
43	17	"Moonshine"	Unknown	Unknown	December 23, 1954
44	18	"The Man Who Couldn't Remember"	Unknown	Unknown	December 30, 1954
45	19	"Another World"	Erle C. Kenton	Jerry D. Lewis	January 6, 1955
46	20	"Deep Ditch"	Unknown	Unknown	January 13, 1955
47	21	"Gunpoint"	Unknown	Unknown	January 20, 1955
48	22	"Your Witness"	Unknown	Unknown	January 27, 1955
49	23	"The Director"	Unknown	Unknown	February 3, 1955
50	24	"Mama's Boy"	Erle C. Kenton	Jerry D. Lewis	February 10, 1955
51	25	"Big Steel"	Harve Foster	Lee Loeb	February 17, 1955
52	26	"Jackpot"	Unknown	Unknown	February 24, 1955
53	27	"A Knowledge of Astronomy"	Unknown	Unknown	March 3, 1955
54	28	"The Hitchhiker"	Unknown	Unknown	March 10, 1955
55	29	"Brutality"	Erle C. Kenton	Jerry D. Lewis	March 17, 1955
56	30	"Cornered"	Harve Foster	William P. Rousseau	March 24, 1955
57	31	"Time to Kill"	Unknown	Unknown	March 31, 1955
58	32	"The Sapphire Mink"	Unknown	Unknown	April 7, 1955
59	33	"Stepfather"	Unknown	Unknown	April 14, 1955
60	34	"A Pair of Gloves"	Unknown	Unknown	April 21, 1955
61	35	"End of the Line"	Unknown	Unknown	April 28, 1955
62	36	"Clifford Pike"	Unknown	Unknown	May 5, 1955
63	37	"Charge It, Please"	Unknown	Unknown	May 12, 1955
64	38	"Condemned"	Unknown	Unknown	May 19, 1955
65	39	"Operation: Fleet"	Unknown	Unknown	May 26, 1955
66	40	"In Memory of Murder"	Unknown	Unknown	June 2, 1955
67	41	"The Bad Ones"	Unknown	Unknown	June 9, 1955
68	42	"The Jockey and the Nun"	Unknown	Unknown	June 16, 1955
69	43	"The Failure"	Unknown	Unknown	June 23, 1955

== Production ==
Mort Lewis and Sam Shayon created The Public Defender, which was produced by Hal Roach Studios/Official Films. Carroll Case was the producer. Directors included Budd Boetticher. The show was filmed in black-and-white.

The show debuted as the summer replacement for Philip Morris Playhouse. It was initially sponsored by Philip Morris cigarettes, and in March 1955, Revlon Products Corporation became the alternate-week sponsor. "Grand Canyon Suite" was the theme. It was initially broadcast from 10 to 10:30 p.m. Eastern Time on Thursdays. In July 1954 it was moved to 9-9:30 p.m. ET on Mondays as the summer replacement for I Love Lucy. In September 1954 it returned to its original time slot.

== Critical response ==
Hal Erickson, in his book, Encyclopedia of Television Law Shows: Factual and Fictional Series About Judges, Lawyers and the Courtroom, 1948-2008, wrote, "Public Defender was distinguished by a mile-wide streak of maudlin sentimentality."
