= Hay Foot =

1942 film by Fred Guiol

- Film poster
- Directed by: Fred Guiol
- Screenplay by: Eugene Conrad; Edward E. Seabrook
- Produced by: Fred Guiol
- Starring: William Tracy; Joe Sawyer; James Gleason
- Cinematography: Robert Pittack
- Edited by: Richard C. Currier
- Music by: Edward Ward
- Distributed by: United Artists
- Release date: January 2, 1942
- Running time: 48 minutes
- Country: United States
- Language: English

Hay Foot is a 1942 American military comedy, a sequel to Tanks a Million which brings back most of the characters from that film. The two leading characters, sergeant Doubleday (played by William Tracy) and his rival Sergeant Ames (Joe Sawyer), would go on to feature in six more films.

This was one of Hal Roach's Streamliners, films less than an hour designed to fill out a double feature bill. Fred Guiol directed seven of the eight Doubleday/Ames films, the exception being 1951's As You Were.

== Plot ==
Dodo Doubleday, the raw recruit who quickly made sergeant's rank due to his encyclopedic mind and a few lucky accidents, has been inexplicably reduced from first sergeant to staff sergeant and has resumed being orderly to his regimental commander Colonel Barkley. Sergeant Ames is still a buck sergeant who hates Dodo because he advanced to outrank Ames within Dodo's first 24 hours in the army. Dodo's former comrade in arms Charlie Cobb is also a buck sergeant. As both Cobb and Ames are the best marksman in the regiment but constantly boast of their prowess, Colonel Barkley seeks to find an expert who can outshoot them.

Though possessing a photographic memory that enabled him to advance from private to senior non-commissioned officer in less than 24 hours, Dodo has one weakness: though his book knowledge enables him to give lectures on weapons disassembly and ballistics, he is gun shy and an incompetent marksman. After nearly shooting several of his fellow soldiers on the pistol range, with the actual target being the safest place to hide, Dodo is ordered to go into the woods to practice. There his missed shots impress the picnicking colonel and his daughter Betty when Dodo accidentally shoots a hawk through the eye whilst in flight and after the colonel catches a fish who breaks the line and is in the process of rolling back into the water, an accidental discharge from Dodo's pistol shoots the fish through his eye. Eager to deflate the boasting Ames and Cobb, the colonel bets a month's pay that Dodo can outshoot Ames and Cobb.

Ames and Cobb's hatred of Dodo increases when in the interests of promoting democracy in the United States Army, Betty invites Dodo to dinner at the colonel's quarters, but Ames and Cobb believe they have been invited as well.

== Cast ==
- William Tracy as Sergeant "Dodo" Doubleday
- Joe Sawyer as Sergeant Ames
- James Gleason as Colonel J. A. Barkley
- Noah Beery Jr. as Sgt. Charlie Cobb
- Elyse Knox as Betty Barkley
- Douglas Fowley as Captain Rossmead
- Harold Goodwin as Lieutenant Caldwell
