= Sondra Rodgers =

American film and television actress (1903–1997)

- Born: Fenella Jewell Rodgers; February 3, 1903; Trimble County, Kentucky, U.S.
- Died: July 22, 1997 (aged 94); Los Angeles, California; U.S.
- Other name: Sondra Arleaux
- Occupation: Actress
- Years active: 1944 - 1970 (film)

Sondra Rodgers (born Fenella Jewell Rodgers; 1903–1997) was an American film and television actress.

== Early years ==
Born Fenella Jewell Rodgers, she grew up on the family farm in Trimble County, Kentucky. She was the daughter of J. L. Rodgers and his wife, Lacy Rodgers. When she was 17, she moved to New York and began modeling for a commercial photographer.

== Radio ==
Rodgers left the stage to work in radio in 1934. She was heard often in the United States on broadcasts of Miniature Theater of the Air and on a number of soap operas.

She also worked in radio in Europe. Although she was employed by Radio Luxembourg, she was based in London. Her programs were recorded and shipped to Luxembourg for broadcast. After concluding her work in Europe, she returned to Kentucky and wrote scripts for WLAP in Lexington.

== Stage ==
Rodgers' early acting experience came in New York when she worked (using the name Sondra Arleaux) in stock theater with Jessie Bonstelle. She appeared on Broadway in Riddle Me This (1933).

Rodgers spent time in Europe studying with playwrights, then returned to the United States, where she directed plays at the Pasadena Playhouse with Gilmour Brown as her supervisor.

Later, in Los Angeles, Rodgers acted in plays, including No Time for Comedy, Heaven Can Wait, Cry Havoc, an dFamily Portrait.

== Film ==
Rodgers signed her first film contract, with Metro-Goldwyn-Mayer, in May 1944. Her film debut came in Marriage Is a Private Affair (1944).

== Television ==
Rodgers portrayed Mrs. Appleby in the 1961 episode "A Doctor Comes to Town" of the television series Window on Main Street.. She played the prudish (unnamed) mother of daughters Elmira and Dodie on "Wagon Train" in S1 E18 "The Gabe Carswell Story" which aired 1/14/1958.

== Filmography ==
Year	Title	Role	Notes
1944	Marriage Is a Private Affair	Nurse	Uncredited
1944	Lost in a Harem	Zaida	Uncredited
1945	Keep Your Powder Dry	WAC Hodgekins	
1945	Anchors Aweigh	Jean	Uncredited
1945	The Hidden Eye	Helen Roberts	
1946	Up Goes Maisie		Uncredited
1946	Easy to Wed	Attendant	
1946	Boys' Ranch	Mrs. O'Neill	Uncredited
1948	Tap Roots	Shellie Dabney	
1951	As You Were	WAC Captain	
1963	Tammy and the Doctor	First Nurse	
1966	Country Boy	Mrs. Byrd	
1970	Airport	Margaret Rogers - Passenger	Uncredited, (final film role)

== Bibliography ==
- Erickson, Hal. Military Comedy Films: A Critical Survey and Filmography of Hollywood Releases Since 1918. McFarland, 2012.
