= Jan Duggan =

American actress (1881–1977)

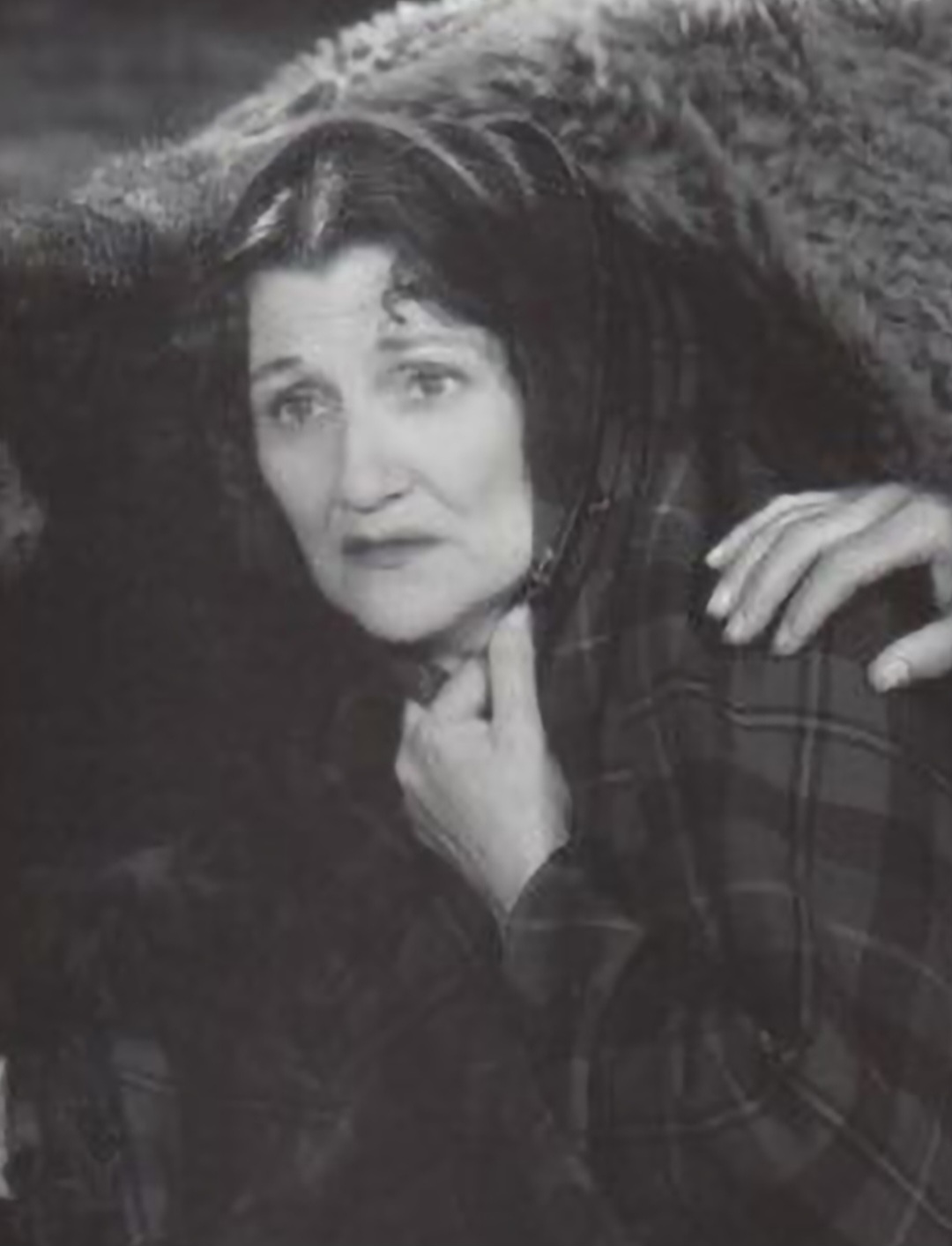
- Duggan in Wagon Wheels (1934)
- Born: Genevieve Hussey; November 6, 1881; St. Louis, Missouri, U.S.
- Died: March 10, 1977 (aged 95); Anaheim, California, U.S.
- Resting place: Grove Hill Memorial Park, Dallas, Texas
- Occupation: Actress
- Years active: 1930–1942
- Spouse: Eugene Fowler Duggan (m. 1915; died 1942)
- Children: 1

Jan Duggan (born Genevieve Hussey; November 6, 1881 – March 10, 1977) was an American film and stage actress.

== Early life ==
Duggan was born Genevieve Hussey in St. Louis, Missouri. She was the daughter of George W. Hussey Sr. and Mary E. Flynn, she had three siblings. Her father died from a gunshot wound in 1894 in an act that was considered a homicide.

Voice lessons and breathing exercises that were administered for her frailty in childhood helped to prepare her for her career. She sang in light opera and in concerts in St. Louis and taught voice lessons after she moved to Dallas.

== Career ==
Duggan started her theatrical career in 1933 after she was cast as the "Bowery Nightingale" in the revival of The Drunkard in the Los Angeles Theatre Mart. Her film career started in 1934, when W. C. Fields interpolated The Drunkard into his 1934 film comedy The Old Fashioned Way. Fields worked well with Duggan, and she became one of the comedian's favorites; he cast her in several of his films. Some of her other films of the 1930s include Wagon Wheels, The County Chairman, A Damsel in Distress, and Mountain Music during the 1930s. During the 1940s she appeared in Manhattan Heartbeat, The Big Store, and Dudes Are Pretty People, among others.

For 20 of the 24 years from 1933 through 1957, Duggan sang between the second and third acts of The Drunkard at the Theater Mart in Los Angeles. She estimated that the number of performances exceeded 7,300.

== Personal life ==
Duggan died on March 10, 1977, in Anaheim, California, aged 95. She was buried in Grove Hill Memorial Park in Dallas, Texas.

== Filmography ==
=== Film ===
- The Old Fashioned Way (1934) - Cleopatra Pepperday
- Wagon Wheels (1934) - Abby Masters
- Forsaking All Others (1934) - Mrs. Cobal - Costumer (uncredited)
- The County Chairman (1935) - Abigail
- Mississippi (1935) - Thrilled Passenger in Pilot House
- Reckless (1935) - Chairwoman (uncredited)
- Alimony Aches (1935) - (Andy Clyde short subject) -- Mary Clyde
- I Live My Life (1935) - Aunt Mathilde, Loud Singer
- The Prisoner of Shark Island (1936) - Actress at Ford's Theatre (uncredited)
- Drift Fence (1936) - Carrie Bingham
- Small Town Girl (1936) - Florence (uncredited)
- Easy to Take (1936) - Miss Higie
- Mountain Music (1937) - Ma Burnside
- New Faces of 1937 (1937) - Opera singer at audition (uncredited)
- Wife, Doctor and Nurse (1937) - Supt. of Nurses
- Life Begins in College (1937) - Telephone Operator (uncredited)
- A Damsel in Distress (1937) - Miss Ruggles
- Midnight Intruder (1938) - Mrs. Randolph
- Scandal Street (1938) - Vera Veazy
- Kentucky Moonshine (1938) - Nurse
- One Wild Night (1938) - Mrs. Halliday
- The Wages of Sin (1938) - uncredited
- Thanks for Everything (1938) - Miss Twitchell
- You Can't Cheat an Honest Man (1939) - Mrs. Sludge (uncredited)
- Inside Story (1939) - Flora
- The Story of Alexander Graham Bell (1939) - Mrs. Winthrop
- The House of Fear (1939) - Sarah Henderson
- Here I Am a Stranger (1939) - Landlady (uncredited)
- My Little Chickadee (1940) - Uppity Little Bend Woman (uncredited)
- Manhattan Heartbeat (1940) - Wife
- The Bank Dick (1940) - Mrs. Muckle - Mother in Bank (uncredited)
- Las Vegas Nights (1941) - Flirtatious Dowager (uncredited)
- The Big Store (1941) - Henry's Wife (uncredited)
- The Richest Man in Town (1941) - Penelope Kidwell
- Dudes Are Pretty People (1942) - Dude Ranch Guest
- Calaboose (1943) - Radio Girl (voice, uncredited)
- The Meanest Man in the World (1943) - Mrs. Throckmorton (uncredited)

== Select Stage Credits ==
- The Drunkard (1933-57)
