= Jimmy Rogers (actor) =

American actor (1915–2000)

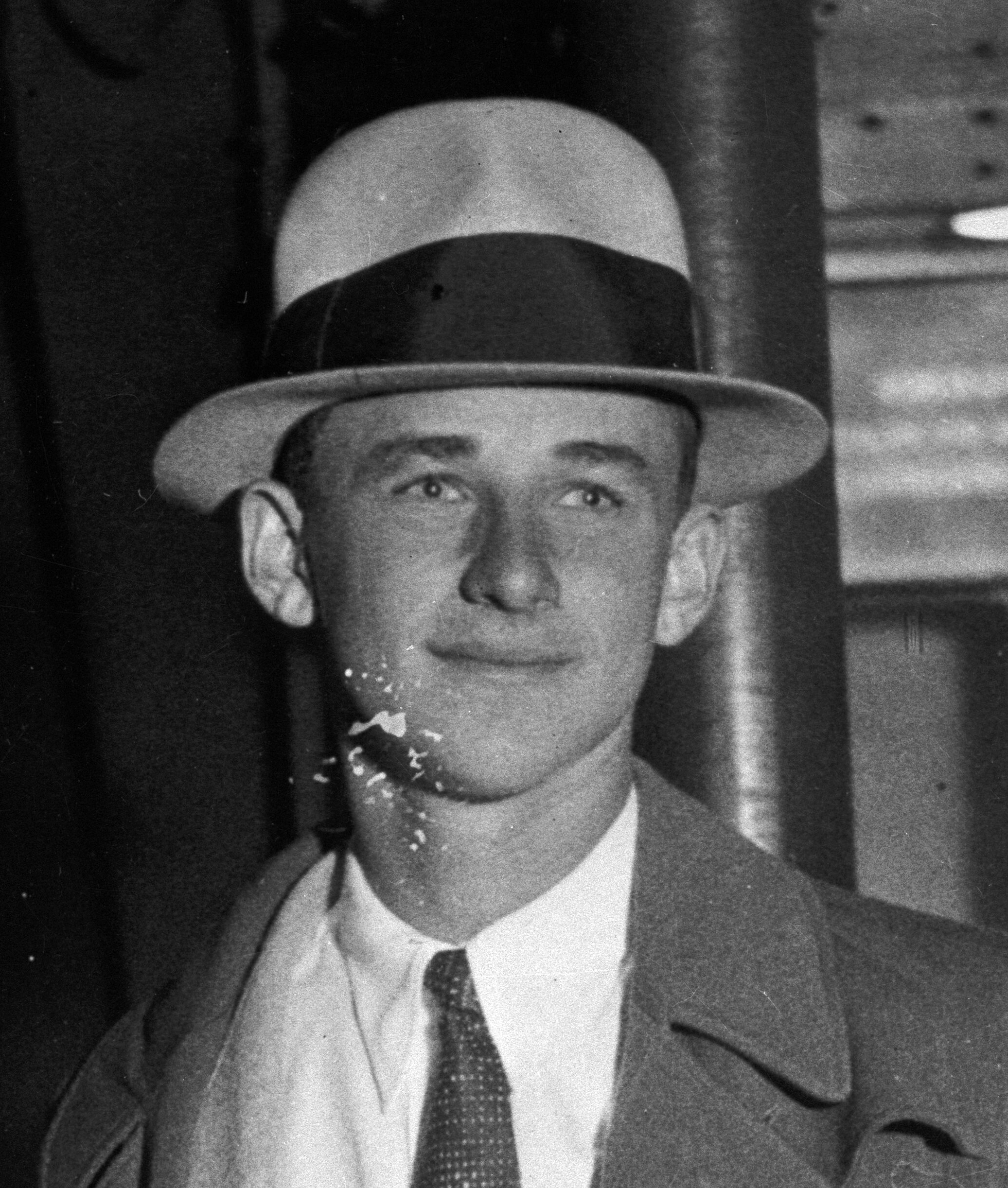
- Rogers, c. 1930
- Born: James Blake Rogers; July 25, 1915; New York City, U.S.
- Died: April 28, 2000 (aged 84); Bakersfield, California, U.S.
- Resting place: Will Rogers Memorial, Claremore, Oklahoma
- Other name: Jim Rogers
- Occupations: Actor; newspaperman; rancher
- Spouses: Astrea Kemmler (m. 1938; died 1987) Judith Braun (m. 1995)
- Children: 3
- Parent(s): Will Rogers and Betty Blake Rogers
- Relatives: Will Rogers Jr. (brother), Mary Amelia Rogers (sister), Fred Stone Rogers (brother)

James Blake Rogers (July 25, 1915 – April 28, 2000), commonly known as Jimmy (also spelled Jimmie), was an American actor, horse rancher, polo player, and newspaperman. The son of humorist and social commentator Will Rogers, he was the family representative on the Will Rogers Memorial Commission, and worked with the staff at the Will Rogers State Historic Park.

== Early years ==
Rogers was born in New York City on July 25, 1915, the son of Will Rogers and Betty Blake. He had three siblings: Will Jr. (1911–1993), Mary (1913–1989), and Fred (1918–1920). He spent his childhood in Beverly Hills, but moved to a ranch in the late 1920s, and grew to love working with horses. He attended Pomona College, but left in 1935, after his father and pilot Wiley Post died in a plane crash.

== Film career ==
As a child he had parts in four of his father's silent films, and was billed as Jimmy Rogers. He used that stage name in all of his film roles. Rogers was more interested in raising horses, so in the 1930s he and a friend purchased a ranch in Santa Barbara County, but in the early 1940s the U. S. government bought the ranch for a new army base, which later became Vandenberg Air Force Base.

In need of a new occupation he returned to acting. He made three comedy westerns with Noah Beery Jr. at Hal Roach Studios. Rogers then went on to make six Hopalong Cassidy movies with William Boyd, playing a fictional version of himself, a character named Jimmy Rogers.

== Later work ==
During the later part of World War II Rogers joined the Marine Corps and worked as a writer and correspondent. After the war he and his brother Will Rogers Jr. ran The Beverly Hills Citizen, a newspaper that was published between 1955 and 1962.

He appeared in documentaries about his father's life, includingThe Story of Will Rogers, a 1961 episode of the television documentary Project Twenty, which was narrated by Bob Hope, and Will Rogers, a 2001 episode of California’s Gold, which aired after Rogers’ death.

Rogers was the family representative on the Will Rogers Memorial Commission, and worked with the staff at the Will Rogers State Historic Park. Michelle Lefebvre-Carter, the director of the Memorial Commission stated: "Jim Rogers referred to Will Rogers affectionately as 'Dad' in family matters and 'WR' in reference to the icon."

Rogers owned a California ranch, where he trained horses and operated a riding school. He attended western fan conventions, and talked about his movie career.

== Personal life ==
Rogers married Astrea Kemmler on March 26, 1938, and they had three children – James Kemmler Rogers, Charles Edward Rogers, and Astrea Elizabeth Rogers Brandon. His first wife died on November 19, 1987. He married Judith Braun on August 31, 1995. Rogers died of cancer on April 28, 2000.

== Filmography ==
- 1920 Water, Water, Everywhere – uncredited bit role
- 1920 The Strange Boarder – Billy Gardner
- 1920 Jes' Call Me Jim – Harry Benedict
- 1921 Doubling for Romeo – Jimmie Jones
- 1942 Dudes Are Pretty People – Jimmy
- 1943 Calaboose – Jimmy
- 1943 Prairie Chickens – Jimmy
- 1943 False Colors – Jimmy Rogers
- 1943 Riders of the Deadline – Jimmy Rogers
- 1944 Texas Masquerade – Jimmy Rogers
- 1944 Lumberjack – Jimmy Rogers
- 1944 Mystery Man – Jimmy Rogers
- 1944 Forty Thieves – Jimmy Rogers
