= Clement V. Rogers =

American politician

Clement Vann Rogers
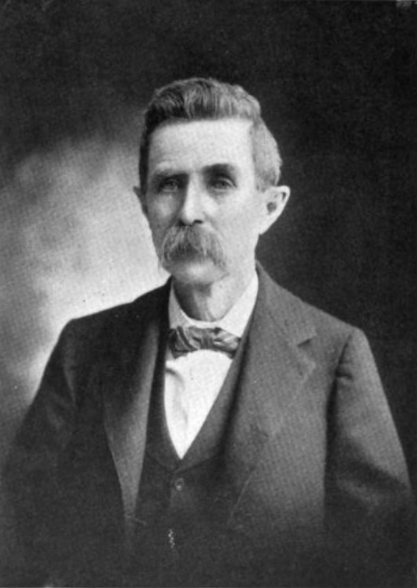
- Born: January 11, 1839; Westville, Goingsnake District, Cherokee Nation, Indian Territory
- Died: October 28, 1911 (aged 72); Chelsea, Rogers County, Oklahoma
- Other names: Clem Rogers, C. V. Rogers
- Citizenship: Cherokee Nation and U.S.
- Occupations: Cattleman, soldier, politician
- Notable work: Oklahoma Constitutional Convention
- Spouse: Mary America Schrimsher (married 1958; died 1891) Mary Almeda Bible (married 1893; died 1900)
- Children: Elizabeth Rogers, Sally Clementine Rogers, Maude Ethel Rogers, May Rogers, Will Rogers (son), and three others
- Parent(s): Robert Rogers Jr. and Sallie Vann

Clement Vann Rogers (January 11, 1839 – October 28, 1911), known often as "Uncle Clem," was a cattle baron and prominent Cherokee politician and judge in Indian Territory. Clem Rogers' parents were both mixed-blood Cherokees who moved to Indian Territory in 1832, several years before the Trail of Tears. Before the American Civil War, Clem allied with the "Treaty Party", a Cherokee faction that supported signing the Treaty of New Echota. When the Civil War broke out, Clem enlisted in the Confederate Army, and served under General Stand Watie. After the war, he became active in Cherokee politics, first elected as a judge in the Cooweescoowee District, then served five terms in the Cherokee Senate. He later served as a delegate to the Oklahoma Constitutional Convention. Rogers was the father of entertainer Will Rogers.

When Oklahoma became a state in 1907, the former Cherokee Districts were dissolved and replaced by new counties. One of the counties created from the former Cooweescoowee District, Rogers County, Oklahoma, was named in honor of Clement Rogers.

== Family lineage ==
Rogers's parents, Robert Rogers Jr. (1815 - 1842) and Sallie Vann (1818 - 1882), "came from Georgia before the main removal of the Cherokees in 1838." (Note: Robert and Sallie migrated from Georgia to the Arkansas Territory in 1832. They would move again to Indian Territory in 1835. p. 37)

Roger's paternal grandfather was Robert Rogers Sr., a Scotch-Irish immigrant and trader, who came to the area now known as West Virginia in 1800. Settling there, he married a half-Cherokee woman named Lucy Cordery. Robert Jr. was their first son.

By the time the U.S. Congress passed the Indian Removal Act in 1830, Robert Sr. had died and Lucy Cordery had brought her family to live in Georgia. After a group of mostly mixed-blood Cherokees signed the Treaty of New Echota in 1830, they decided that migrating west was inevitable and moved in 1832 to a tract of land near the boundary of Arkansas Territory and Indian Territory.

Roger's mother Sallie was also from a mixed-blood family and was said to be three-eighths Cherokee. She was a sister of David Vann, who was closely related to the Cherokee chief James Vann.

Robert Jr. and Sallie built a two-story, five-room house near the community of Westville, in the Goingsnake District of Indian Territory (what is now Maysville, Oklahoma), where Robert established a prosperous farm. Their first child, Rogers' sister Margaret, was born there in 1836. Rogers was born there on January 11, 1839.

== Early life ==
Robert Rogers Jr. died when Clem was very young. His mother Sallie remarried to a man named William Musgrove.

Clem exhibited a disdain for formal education. Although his mother pushed him into attending school, she had to stand in the road when he left the house and make sure he followed the path to school, rather than going in a different direction. He first attended a Baptist missionary school, about a mile from his home. He then went to the Cherokee Male Seminary in Tahlequah, but soon dropped out to work as a hand on a ranch owned by Joel M. Bryan. On May 15, 1855, when Clem was just a teenager, he and fifteen other cowboys began to drive 500 longhorn steers to sell in Kansas City. They found no buyers there, so continued the drive to St. Louis, an additional 250 miles (400 km). The journey took four months and proved Clem's endurance and tenacity.

This story from Clem Rogers' youth was relayed by his son Will Rogers in Betty Blake Rogers' biography Will Rogers: His Wife's Story:

"One time papa told me that he drove a bunch of cattle for his folks up to Kansas City. When they got there they found there was no market for them, so papa said, 'Well, what other town have you got around here that wants two thousand head of cattle?' He was told St. Louis was a great market, so papa and his gang lit out for there—only 250 miles away. Now, if I wanted to make a scenario of this, instead of the truth, I would tell you that they couldn't sell in St. Louis and had to go on to Chicago. But such is not the truth. They just didn't happen to meet anyone with a sense of humor, so they drove their cattle on to the St. Louis market and lost only one steer on the trip. He jumped off the boat as they were crossing the Mississippi taking them over to the stockyards in East St. Louis. Papa said the last he saw of the old steer he was floating down the river and I don't know at that if he ever drowned. Mark Twain just as likely as not picked him up with one of those old steam shovels of his. It took them four months driving their cattle to market, but they were only nine days making the trip home. After they sold their cattle they all had to ride home to the Indian Territory on horseback. Papa rode a mule on the whole trip—not much romance in that—that's why he came back single."

== Marriage ==
Following the drive to Kansas City, Rogers decided to establish his own ranch. His mother gifted him twenty-five cows, a bull, four horses, and two slaves, Rabb and Houston, who had belonged to his father. Rogers and his entourage moved West until they came to a tributary of the Caney River in the Cooweescoowee District, which would later be renamed Rogers County in his honor.

In 1858, Rogers married Mary America Schrimsher. Rogers had met Mary while he was attending seminary school in Tahlequah. She had attended the Cherokee Female Seminary. The two were both born in 1839 in the Cherokee Nation West (after their parents moved to Indian Territory from Arkansas) and were both one quarter Cherokee. (Note: Mary America Schrimsher's mother, Elizabeth Hunter Gunt Schrimsher (1804–1877), was half-Cherokee, and a member of the Paint Clan. Elizabeth's maternal grandmother was the daughter of a chief, who had married a Welsh trader and gunpowder maker named John Gunter. Mary America's father was another Welsh trader, who had settled in Tennessee.) Clem and Mary were very different in some other respects. Mary's black hair, broad face and narrow cheekbones emphasized her Cherokee ancestry. Clem looked more European because he had sandy hair, blue eyes and a bushy mustache. He was taciturn and had a gruff nature, while she was said to be vivacious, sweet and funny, as well as an excellent musician and dancer. He was indifferent about religion, while she was a devout Methodist. Despite their differences, they remained a devoted couple.

The Schrimsher and Rogers families have been called part of the "Cherokee elite." They were English-speaking, mixed-blood, relatively affluent slave owners who had relatively large farms or plantations, and who had adopted many "civilized" practices, such as sending their children to white or at least missionary schools. Many of this group were not adamantly opposed to moving west, when the white government in Washington, D. C. pressured them to do so. This group became the nucleus of what would become known as the "Treaty Party." The large majority of Cherokees were full-bloods, unable to speak English, non-slaveholders, subsistence farmers, clung to traditional ways of living, chose not to intermarry with whites and adamantly opposed to the idea of giving up their homeland in the Southeast to move across the Mississippi River. Often called the "Conservatives," they lined up with Principal Chief John Ross and his National party which controlled the tribal government before removal.

Mary moved to join her husband on his new ranch from her home in old Fort Gibson. She gave birth to their first daughter, Elizabeth Rogers, in 1861.

The couple would go on to have eight total children:

- Elizabeth Rogers (1861 - 1862)
- Sally Clementine Rogers (1863 - 1943)
- Robert Rogers (1867 - 1881)
- Maude Ethel Rogers (1869 - 1925)
- May Rogers (1873 - 1909)
- Zoe Rogers
- Homer Rogers
- Will Rogers (1879 - 1935)

== Civil War ==
Soon after Elizabeth's birth, the American Civil War broke out. Rogers, like a majority of the mixed-blood Cherokees, favored the faction of Cherokees that supported the Confederates. As the ranch was only 60 miles (97 km) from the border with Union-controlled Kansas, Rogers sent his wife and child, accompanied by a young enslaved boy, back to her parents' home in old Fort Gibson, believing they would be safer there than at his ranch. All three arrived safely but the infant soon became ill and died. Mary fled with her family to Bonham, Texas, where she stayed for the duration of the war.

Meanwhile, Rogers enlisted in Company G of the Cherokee Mounted Volunteers. He later became a captain under Brigadier-General Stand Watie.

Rogers served as a member of the Cherokee Senate during the years 1862 to 1863.

== Post-Civil War ==
When the war ended in 1865, Rogers reunited with Mary and baby Sallie Clementine Rogers, who was born in Bonham in 1863. To support his young family and build back the ranch, Rogers drove a six-horse team in a wagon train, carried goods to the Choctaw and Chickasaw nations, and traded cattle.

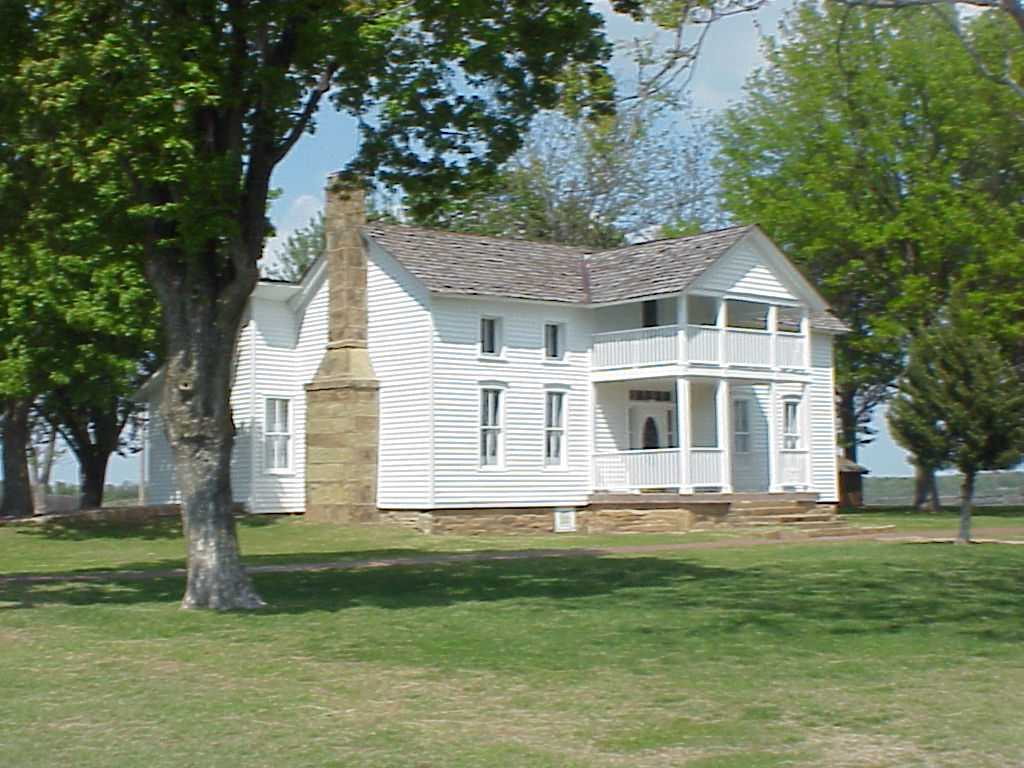
The Rogers' family home on the Verdigris River

Rogers finally settled in the Verdigris River bottom lands with Mary and their three children; Sallie, Maude, and Robert. In the following years, he fenced thousands of acres, introducing the first barbed wire into the Indian Territory. He built a two-story house with a portico and two chimneys, one at each end.

Mary, at the age of forty, gave birth to their last child, William Penn Adair Rogers in the house on November 4, 1879. He was named for the Cherokee leader William Penn Adair, who was a guest at the house on the day.

"Clem's political activities began in 1877 when he ran successful as Judge of the Cooweescoowee District ... . He was Senator from his district five terms for the following years: 1879, 1881, 1883, 1899, 1903."

On May 28, 1890, Mary Rogers died. She was fifty-one.

In 1890 Rogers was President of the Vinita Fair Board.

In 1891 Rogers was President of the Cherokee Livestock Association.

== Second Marriage ==
Rogers married Mary Almeda Bible on June 8, 1893. Born near Alluwe, Oklahoma on March 11, 1866, Mary was the youngest daughter of Lydia Lettie Scaggs and George Preston Bible. She was a devout Methodist. Together, the couple moved from the ranch on the Verdigris River into a home in Claremore, Oklahoma, at Sixth Street and Muskogee Avenue.

"In 1894 ... Clem Rogers became Vice President of the First National Bank of Claremore, a position he held until his death in 1911."

"In 1899, he was elected President of the Claremore School Board.... That part of his beloved Cooweescoowee District where he lived was re-named "Rogers County" in his honor."

In January of 1899, Mary was first reported as having "been quite sick" in the Cherokee Vindicator. This was the result of an unsuccessful appendicitis operation made necessary after Mary suffered an attack of meningitis. In March and September, the couple visited Hot Springs, Arkansas and Colorado Springs in the hope of improving Mary's health. She died in Claremore on January 17, 1900. She was thirty-three.

== Death ==
Following the death of his second wife, Rogers moved into a room above the First National Bank of Claremore. He spent weekends with his daughters and took pride in his son's burgeoning career as a cowboy performer. Will Rogers' wife Betty Blake Rogers described Clem Rogers' final days in her biography of her husband:

Will and I had been married three years and our first baby, Bill, was one week old when Uncle Clem died. I had just received a package from Uncle Clem--three pairs of little black wool stockings with pink-and-blue toes and heels, and a pair of tiny beaded Indian moccasins--when the message arrived. He had spent the week-end as usual with his daughters in Chelsea, and on Saturday night he died suddenly in his sleep at Maude's home.

== Bibliography ==
- Paula McSpadden Love : "Clement Vann Rogers 1839–1911". In :- The Chronicles of Oklahoma, Vol. XLVIII (1970), pp. 389–399.
- Arthur Frank Wertheim and Barbara Blair, editors. The Papers of Will Rogers: The Early Years.Volume I. November 1879 – April 1904. University of Oklahoma Press. Norman and London. ISBN 9780806127453.
