= Prairie Chickens =

1943 film by Hal Roach, Jr.

- Theatrical poster.
- Directed by: Hal Roach, Jr.
- Written by: Donald Hough; Arnold Belgard
- Produced by: Fred Guiol
- Starring: Jimmy Rogers; Noah Beery, Jr. Joe Sawyer
- Distributed by: United Artists
- Release date: May 21, 1943
- Running time: 48 minutes

Prairie Chickens is a 1943 American Western fearurette film and a sequel to Dudes are Pretty People (1942) and Calaboose (1943), Western films from "Hal Roach's Streamliners", a series of approximately 50-minute comedic movies, in this case directed by Hal Roach, Jr. and starring Jimmy Rogers as "Jimmy" and Noah Beery, Jr. as "Pidge Crosby" (Beery's real-life nickname was "Pidge"). The supporting cast features comedy veteran Raymond Hatton, who had been an unofficial comedy partner with Beery's uncle Wallace Beery in several pictures two decades earlier, and the featurette's running time is 48 minutes.

== Cast ==
- Jimmy Rogers as Jimmy
- Noah Beery, Jr. as Pidge
- Joe Sawyer as Albertson
- Marjorie Woodworth as Lucy
- Jack Norton as Henry Lewis-Clark III
- Raymond Hatton as Jefferson 'Jeff' Gibson
- Rosemary La Planche as Yola
