= Calaboose =

Calaboose may be:

- another word for prison
- Calaboose (film), a 1943 film
