= The Story of Will Rogers =

1952 film by Michael Curtiz

- Directed by: Michael Curtiz
- Written by: Jack Moffitt (as John C. Moffitt) (adaptation by)
- Screenplay by: Frank Davis; Stanley Roberts
- Based on: Uncle Clem's Boy; 1940 story in The Saturday Evening Post by Betty Blake Rogers
- Produced by: Robert Arthur
- Starring: Will Rogers Jr. Jane Wyman
- Narrated by: J. Carroll Naish (uncredited)
- Cinematography: Wilfred M. Cline
- Edited by: Folmar Blangsted
- Music by: Victor Young
- Color process: Technicolor
- Production company: Warner Bros. Pictures
- Distributed by: Warner Bros. Pictures
- Release date: July 26, 1952 (USA)
- Running time: 109 minutes
- Country: United States
- Language: English
- Budget: $3 million
- Box office: $2.65 million (US/Canada rentals)

The Story of Will Rogers (titled onscreen as The Story of Will Rogers as told by His Wife) is a 1952 American Western comedy biopic about humorist and movie star Will Rogers, directed by Michael Curtiz and starring Will Rogers Jr. as his father. The supporting cast features Jane Wyman. The film's screenplay was based on the true short story "Uncle Clem's Boy" by Rogers' widow Betty Blake, which was published in The Saturday Evening Post in 1940.

Bing Crosby secretly made a screen test for the lead role in 1943 (available for viewing at the Paley Center for Media in New York City and Los Angeles), but Warner Bros. Pictures owned the rights to the Will Rogers story while Crosby was under contract to Paramount and, in 1941, he had given up the clause that had allowed him to make one independent movie per year. Because of these contractual complications, Crosby could not be cast.

== Plot ==
In the early 1900s, Will Rogers returns to his hometown in Oklahoma after two years of drifting. He meets and falls in love with Betty Blake, a friend of his sister's, but is unwilling to settle down on the ranch because he is happier meeting people and performing rope tricks. This easygoing attitude puts him at odds with his disappointed father, Senator Clement V. Rogers.

Will joins a Wild West show and tours the world, then meets up with Betty at the 1904 St. Louis World's Fair and proposes to her. After they are married, they combine their honeymoon with one of Will's rodeo tours, which ends in New York's Madison Square Garden. There he becomes a hero by lassoing a dangerous bull that gets loose during a performance. The newspaper coverage draws the attention of Bert Lynn, who runs a talent agency. He talks the reluctant Rogers into performing in vaudeville, but his rodeo act does not interest the audience. After six months of unemployment and with a baby due soon, Will goes on stage as a last-minute replacement and is forced to do his act alone, without his horse. After some rope tricks flop, he resorts to talking to the audience; his down-home comedy chatter is a big hit. This wins him a place in the Ziegfeld Follies; he becomes one of its star attractions. He adds political commentary to his act and becomes famous as a "cowboy philosopher" known for witty remarks about politicians and issues of the day.

Later, Will goes to Hollywood to work in films, meets and befriends aviator and fellow Oklahoman Wiley Post. He becomes a strong proponent of aviation. He goes on a European tour, meeting and amusing heads of state.

After the Great Depression strikes, Will works long hours flying around the country to perform benefit shows lifting the spirits of the American people and raising funds for the poor. At the 1932 Democratic National Convention, Will is nominated as a presidential candidate as a "favorite son."

Later, Will takes off with Wiley to Alaska. Will has the plane circle back over the airfield to wave goodbye to Betty one last time. (Both men were killed in an airplane crash in Alaska.)

== Cast ==
- Will Rogers Jr. as Will Rogers
- Jane Wyman as Betty Rogers
- Carl Benton Reid as Sen. Clem Rogers
- Eve Miller as Cora Marshall
- James Gleason as Bert Lynn
- Slim Pickens as Dusty Donovan
- Noah Beery Jr. as Wiley Post
- Mary Wickes as Mrs. Foster
- Steve Brodie as Dave Marshall
- Pinky Tomlin as Orville James
- Margaret Field as Sally Rogers
- Eddie Cantor as himself

== Inaccuracies ==
The film depicts Rogers' father, Clem Rogers, as being part of the Oklahoma delegation at the 1932 Democratic National Convention, despite the fact that Clem Rogers had died in 1911.

== Reception ==
Bosley Crowther of The New York Times wrote that there was "not much action," but that Will Rogers Jr. was "vastly natural" in the part, and while "not an important film" it "gives a tender reflection of a character many people loved." Variety called the script "a sketchy affair," but thought that Curtiz' direction "does a good job in presenting nostalgia, drama and humor, with only occasional slopping over into sentimentality." Harrison's Reports thought that the film "captures much of the charm, wit and human warmth" of Rogers but that it still was "by no means an outstanding entertainment, for its sketchy presentation of the events connected with Rogers' personal life and his rise to fame lacks forceful dramatic impact and does not delve deeply into his character." John McCarten of The New Yorker called it "a bland account" of Rogers' life, "quite without strain or stress or surprises." The Monthly Film Bulletin wrote: "Rogers was in turn performer in wild west shows, successful Ziegfeld star, dabbler in popular politics, aviation enthusiast, great movie box-office attraction and 'favourite son' nominee for the American presidency, but Will Rogers Jr. impersonates his father with an indolent lack of charm that fails entirely to create a character interesting enough to hold these straggling episodes together."
