= Wagon Wheels (film) =

1934 film

- Directed by: Charles Barton
- Written by: Carl A. Buss; Jack Cunningham
- Produced by: Harold Hurley
- Starring: Randolph Scott; Gail Patrick
- Cinematography: William C. Mellor
- Edited by: Jack Dennis
- Music by: John Leipold
- Distributed by: Paramount Pictures
- Release date: September 15, 1934
- Running time: 56 minutes
- Country: United States
- Language: English

Wagon Wheels is a 1934 American Western film directed by Charles Barton and starring Randolph Scott and Gail Patrick. It is a remake of 1931's Fighting Caravans, using stock footage from the original and substituting a new cast. It was based on the Zane Grey 1929 novel Fighting Caravans. The supporting cast features Monte Blue and Raymond Hatton.

== Plot ==
On May 1, 1844, a wagon train leaves Independence, Missouri for Oregon, led by old scouts Bill O'Meary and Jim Burch and the young Clint Belmet, whom they reared. Joining them are the beautiful widow Nancy Wellington and her little boy Sonny, whom Nancy kidnapped from her in-laws after they took custody of Sonny when his father died. Clint warns Nancy about the arduous trip west, but she is determined and buys a sturdy rig from the half-Indian fur trapper Kenneth Murdock. Fearing that the white man will destroy his prosperous fur trade in the Northwest, Murdock conspires with other trappers to prevent the settlers from reaching Powder River. Meanwhile, the elderly Abby Masters, who is keeping a journal of the trip, falls in love with Jim and records the caravan's two-week fight with roving bands of Indians. After the fifth man dies, Murdock tries to convince the train to turn back, but Clint refuses. While Sonny celebrates his fourth birthday, Nancy confides her past to Clint and the two fall silently in love. When the train reaches the Beaver Parks Trading Post, the men spend two weeks drinking and gambling until Clint, disappearing for four days, spies Murdock conspiring with Indians and rallies the women to force their men back on the trail. When they reach Powder River, the Indians attack, and Abby's sister Hetty and scout Bill are killed before Clint sets the kerosene wagon on fire and creates a cloud of smoke, forcing the Indians to retreat. While the hand of Bill's ghost joins them in a pledge, Jim and Clint promise to lead the train safely to Oregon. There, Jim and Abby decide to marry, and Clint asks Sonny if he would like him for a father.

== Cast ==
- Randolph Scott as Clint Belmet
- Gail Patrick as Nancy Wellington
- Billy Lee as Sonny Wellington
- Monte Blue as Kenneth Murdock
- Raymond Hatton as Jim Burch
- Jan Duggan as Abby Masters
- Leila Bennett as Hetty Masters
- Olin Howland as Bill O'Leary
- Howard Wilson as Permit Officer
- Julian Madison as Lester
- Alfred Delcambre as Ebe
- Donald Gray as Chauncey (as Eldred Tidbury)
- Colin Tapley as Mountaineer

== Reception ==
In a contemporary review for The New York Times, critic Frank S. Nugent wrote: "Having so many colorful ingredients, the story must, of necessity, produce an aura of romantic adventure. But the glow is short-lived, and, in retrospect, the film is a pallid reflection of the history it attempts to relive. ... The film does possess much that is interesting and entertaining. The regrets are mostly for what it might have been."
