= Dudes Are Pretty People =

1942 film

- Theatrical poster.
- Directed by: Hal Roach, Jr.
- Written by: Louis S. Kay; Donald Hough
- Starring: Jimmy Rogers; Noah Beery, Jr. Marjorie Woodworth
- Distributed by: United Artists
- Release date: March 1942
- Running time: 43 minutes

Dudes are Pretty People is a 1942 film and the first Western entry of "Hal Roach's Streamliners", approximately 50-minute comedic movies, directed by Hal Roach, Jr. and starring Jimmy Rogers as "Jimmy" and Noah Beery, Jr. as "Pidge Crosby" (Beery's real-life nickname was "Pidge"). The featurette was written by Louis S. Kaye from a story by Donald Hough. The running time for this film is 43 minutes and the picture was released in March 1942. The film had two Streamliners sequels, Calaboose and Prairie Chickens, both released in 1943 with Rogers and Beery in the same roles.
