= Betty Blake Rogers =

American author and wife of Will Rogers

Personal details
- Born: Betty Blake; September 9, 1879 Monte Ne, Arkansas, US
- Died: June 21, 1944 (aged 64) Santa Monica, California, US
- Resting place: Will Rogers Memorial in Claremore, Oklahoma
- Spouse: Will Rogers (m. 1908)
- Children: Will Rogers Jr., Mary Amelia Rogers, James Blake Rogers, and Fred Stone Rogers

Betty Blake Rogers (September 9, 1879 – June 21, 1944) was an American author. She was the wife of actor Will Rogers and worked to uphold her husband's legacy after his death. Her efforts led to the creation of the Will Rogers State Park at the family's Santa Monica ranch and the Will Rogers Memorial in Claremore, Oklahoma.

== Biography ==
Betty Blake was born on September 9, 1879, in Monte Ne in Benton County, Arkansas, which was at the time the small village of Silver Springs. She was the seventh of eight children. Her father, James Wyeth Blake, was a miller. He died while Betty was still young, leaving her mother, Amelia Crowder Blake, to support the family through dress making. Amelia moved the family North to Rogers, Arkansas. There, Betty attended Rogers Academy and performed in amateur theatrical productions.

In the Fall of 1900, Blake was recovering from a bout of typhoid fever and visiting one of her sisters, who lived in the Oologah, Oklahoma train depot. While helping her brother in-law run the station, Blake met Will Rogers, then a cattle rancher and rope trick performer. They spent time playing music together, Blake on the piano and Rogers singing. Blake returned to Arkansas just before Christmas of that year and the two exchanged a few letters before falling out of contact. In the following years, Blake clerked at the H. L. Stroud Mercantile Company and set type at the Rogers Democrat.

Blake met Rogers again in 1904. She had gone to St. Louis to visit another one of her sisters and attend the 1904 World's Fair in St. Louis. Rogers had recently returned to the United States and was performing at the fair. Having heard that Rogers was performing, Blake sent him a note and he invited her to the show and dinner. Blake later recorded in her biography of her husband that she was embarrassed by Will's profession. She specifically hated the outfit he wore for that performance:

"To my horror, he was decked out in a very tight-fitting red velvet suit, bespattered with gold braid. He looked so funny, and I was so embarrassed when my sister and Mary gave me sidelong glances and smiled at the costume, that I didn't hear the applause or find much joy in Will's expertness with the rope. Not until later did Will tell me the story of the red velvet suit. It wasn't his regular costume for the act. Usually he wore chaps, a colored shirt and a handkerchief around his neck, but today he had wanted to look his very best. He had worn the red velvet suit for my special benefit. Because Mexican cowboys had created the first tricks with the lasso, the Wirth Brothers Circus in Australia had advertised Will as "The Mexican Rope Artist," and Mrs. George Wirth had made the velvet costume with her own hands. Will was proud of the suit—it was one of his treasured possessions—but he never wore it again."

After the show, Blake and Rogers had dinner and heard John McCormack sing. Rogers promised to write and this time the two stayed in touch.

Rogers proposed in 1906, at which time Blake refused. He proposed again in, early in November 1908 with the promise that they would settle down in the house Rogers' father had given him in Claremore, Oklahoma.

An engagement announcement was published in the Rogers Democrat that same month:

Announcement is made of the approaching wedding of Miss Betty Blake of Rogers and Will Rogers of Claremore, Okla., at the home of the bride Wednesday, November 25th. The announcement has created much interest owing to the prominence of the bride in local circles.

The couple were married on November 25, 1908, at Blake's mother's house. They honeymooned in New York City, where Will was performing. Towards the end of what was promised to be Rogers' final tour, the couple was robbed of their savings and much of their belongings. So when an offer came to continue touring for more money than Rogers had ever been paid, Blake agreed that he should take it.

Blake gave birth to their first child, William Vann Rogers, in New York City on October 20, 1911. From this time on Blake would make long visits to her mother's home in Rogers, Oklahoma, where she eventually gave birth to their daughter, Mary Amelia Rogers, on May 18, 1913. Blake gave birth to their second son, James Blake Rogers, in New York on July 25, 1915. She subsequently gave birth to one more child, a son named Fred Stone Rogers, on July 15, 1918. Fred died of diphtheria on June 17, 1920.

In 1919, as Roger's film career was taking off, the family moved to a ranch in Santa Monica, California.

Blake wrote a biography of her husband titled Will Rogers: His Wife's Story. The book was published in 1941 and reprinted 1979.

== Death ==
Rogers died in an airplane crash in Alaska on August 15, 1935. Although he was originally buried in California, in 1942 a new sunken garden was built in front of the Will Rogers Memorial, and he was interred there in 1944.

Blake died on June 21, 1944, in Santa Monica, and was laid to rest with her husband in the tomb in Claremore.
