= Donald Hough =

American novelist

- Born: Donald Merriam Hough; June 29, 1895; St. Paul, Minnesota, U.S.
- Died: May 11, 1965 (aged 69); Jackson Hole, Wyoming, U.S.
- Occupations: Author; Magazine writer
- Notable work: Snow Above Town; Captain Retread

Signature
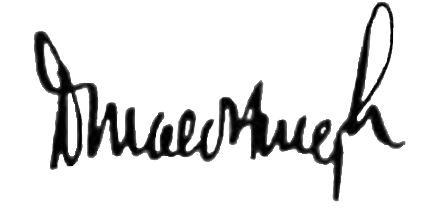

Donald Merriam Hough (June 29, 1895 – May 11, 1965) was an American humorist and author of 7 books, over 400 magazine articles, and 3 film scripts for the Hal Roach's Streamliners series. He was also a popular writer for several hunting, fishing and outdoor magazines including: Outdoor Life, Forest and Stream, Outer's Book, Sunset, Fins, Feathers, and Fur, Field and Stream, and was a frequent contributor to Outdoor America, Collier's Magazine, Esquire and The Saturday Evening Post, having written 28 articles for them.

In addition to his extensive writing career, he also had jobs as a publicist, advertising and sales manager, and taught at The City College of New York and the State University of Iowa. Hough moved around a lot during his lifetime, with reports of him living in Minnesota, New York City, Hollywood, and Wyoming.

== Early life and career ==
Hough was born in St. Paul, Minnesota in 1895 to Sherwood P. Hough, and Edith Evelyn née Moses. Hough's boyhood home was a grouping of five trolley cars: a kitchen, dining room, living room and two bedrooms. Hough's father, who was a purchasing agent for the Tri-State Telephone Company in St. Paul, found about an offer of free streetcars being given away, and took five of the cars and moved them on to a lot he owned. He remodeled the cars by adding a stable roof, resurfacing the interior walls, and building a fieldstone fireplace. Hough's book The Streetcar House is a tribute to his father, and the dust cover illustration of his book shows the result of his father's work on their "Streetcar House".

In 1917, he enlisted in the Army Signal Corps, serving as a First Lieutenant in France during World War I. After returning from the war, he worked for the U.S. Forest Service, and as a night beat police reporter for the St. Paul Pioneer Press and later for the St. Paul Daily News. Throughout his literary career, he wrote articles for several outdoor magazines, such as: Outdoor Life, Forest and Stream, Sunset, Field and Stream, and was a frequent contributor to Outdoor America. In 1923, he was a National Director of the Izaak Walton League, who published Outdoor America. He also worked as a freelance writer for several national magazines like Collier's, Cosmopolitan, Harper's Magazine, Esquire and The Saturday Evening Post, having written 28 articles for them.

In 1938, Hough and his family were on their way to Mexico City for a vacation, when he decided to stop in Jackson Hole, Wyoming to do some fishing. Gambling was illegal at that time, but law enforcement looked the other way, and Hough proceeded to lose all their money in a roulette game in Jackson Hole. Now that the family was penniless, they were forced to stay in the small town of 500 people, where he took odd jobs in town, including being a bartender, to support his family. In 1943, his first book Snow Above Town was published, which was inspired from the time he had lived in Jackson Hole, and featured several stories and anecdotes from his various jobs and folks that he had encountered while living there. The Armed Services helped him out with his book by printing and distributing over 250,000 copies in an Armed Services Edition, which were shipped overseas to the troops. He eventually moved out of Wyoming and headed to Hollywood where he turned his stories into short films for the Hal Roach's Streamliners series. He also worked for the Los Angeles Times as a Hollywood columnist during his time in California.

In the spring of 1942, after the attack on Pearl Harbor, he re-enlisted as a captain in the Air Force, first serving as a gunnery instructor at a base in Las Vegas, before being shipped overseas to the Southwest Pacific. During his service in WWII, he wrote Captain Retread (WWI vets who volunteered for WW II were called retreads) and Darling, I Am Home. The Office of War Information reprinted Captain Retread in English, French, German and Italian, and Hough had the distinction of having more copies of his books released through Armed Services editions than any other author. Edward Streeter wrote in his review of the book that it was a "grand book" and that "it was time that we old timers had a spokesman". Streeter was particularly impressed with a passage from the book, quoting Hough saying: "the last time I went to war, I simply went to war. I kissed mother, wished dad godspeed and went away. This time I am attending the Army as I might attend a football game". The Field Artillery Journal called it a "damn fine book" and a "delightful yarn" that will "amuse you", but at the same time is a "serious book about the Army, particularly in explaining the vexed problems of morale, leadership and civilian-soldier relations".

In 1944, Hough appeared on the NBC Radio show Words At War, a program produced in cooperation with the Council on Books in Wartime. (Note: The Council on Books in Wartime was a group of trade book publishers, librarians, and booksellers formed in 1942 to use books to contribute "to the war effort of the United Peoples." The council viewed books as "weapons in the war of ideas," and the notion of distributing inexpensive paperbacks to American troops overseas on a massive scale appealed to its members.) The show was narrated by Carl Van Doren, and each episode of the show was based on the works of authors who had written books or other literature during WWII. Hough's appearance was a dramatic re-telling of his own personal war stories based on his book Captain Retread.

Hough with fellow writers Struthers Burt and Katharine Burt in Jackson Hole in 1949

In 1949, he returned to Jackson Hole and started compiling stories for his book The Cocktail Hour in Jackson Hole, a sequel to his first book Snow Above Town. The sequel was a humorous and somewhat satirical account of what happened in Jackson Hole when all of the tourists left. Marshall Sprague opined in his review of the book that it was "fresh, joyous, wildly comic and indefatigably fond". He further stated that there was "no stuff about 'tonic air' or 'monumental uplands', and no "junk on the Eocene or ominous lectures on conservatism", but rather just a "Guys and Dolls" approach to the Tetons.

Jackson Hole was also home to fellow writers Struthers Burt and Katherine Burt, whom Hough was friends with. The town had furnished the pair of writers with abundant material for their books as well. Like Hough, Struthers was also a frequent contributor to The Saturday Evening Post.

== Retirement and death ==
After his wife died, he moved back to Jackson Hole to retire, living on his military pension. A reporter for The Jackson Hole Guide recalled that Hough was a "pitiful shell of the once roistering Hough, broken in health and just plain broke". A local bartender remembered Hough telling her that if he "stayed late enough, people walked away and left their drinks, and you could pick one up and didn't have to buy them".

In May 1965, Hough dropped a burning cigarette next to his recliner chair, and went to bed. As a result of the fire, he died of smoke inhalation. Hough was a veteran of both World Wars, and was buried with full military honors, including a color guard and a firing squad. He was buried at the Aspen Hill Cemetery in Jackson, Wyoming.

== Books ==
- — (1943). Snow Above Town. W. W. Norton.
- — (1944). Captain Retread. W. W. Norton.
- — (1945). Big Distance. Duell, Sloan and Pearce.
- — (1946). Darling, I Am Home. W. W. Norton.
- — (1946). The Camelephamoose. Duell, Sloan & Pearce.
- — (1956). The Cocktail Hour in Jackson Hole. Norton.
- — (1960). The Streetcar House. Duell, Sloan and Pearce.

== Selected magazine articles ==
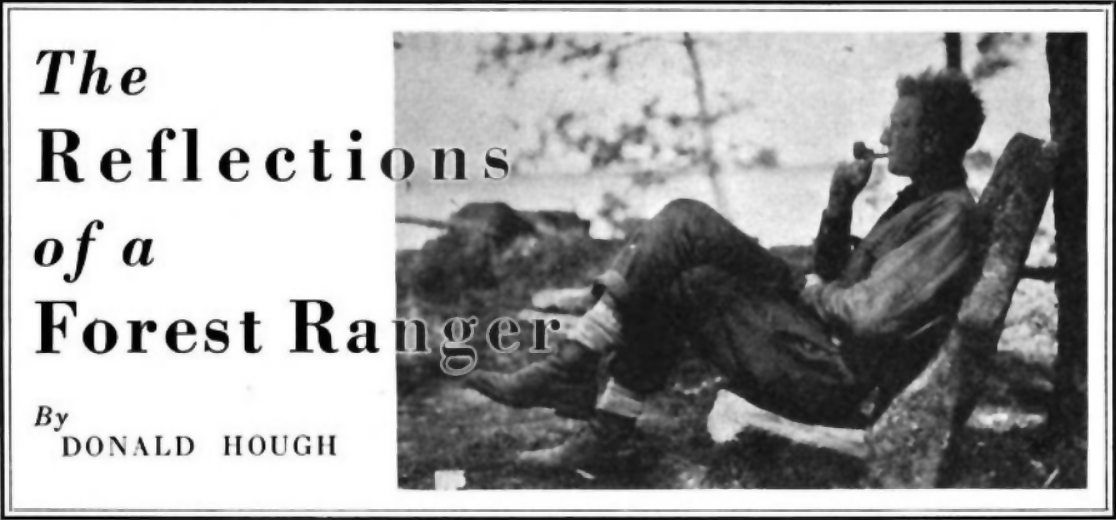
Hough's monthly column in Outdoor America

- "To Saganaga and Back". Outer's Recreation. 1921. p. 141.
- "The Coldest Canoe Trip". The Outing Magazine. July 1921. p. 162.
- "Articles in Outdoor America". Outdoor America. 1923.
- "King of the Wild Rice Beds". The Dearborn Independent. October 1925. p. 12.
- "The Gift Of The Gods". Harper's Magazine. August 1926. p. 386.
- "Ducks, Geese and Thanksgiving". Forest and Stream. November 1926. p. 653.
- "Horses Are Funny People". Sunset Magazine. February 1927. p. 18.
- "Me and My Girl Friends". Outdoor Life. June 1928. pp. 13–15.
- "Dinner Bites Man". Esquire. October 1936. p. 46.
- "She's Wet All Over". Esquire. July 1941. p. 72.
- "Frances Farmer: a Dutch Treat". Esquire. October 1941. p. 88.
- "Barrack-Room Babes". The Saturday Evening Post. October 1943. p. 19.
- "The Chamber of Commerce Sailfish". The Saturday Evening Post. April 1947. p. 32.
- "Private Office". Collier's Magazine. August 1949. p. 18.
- "Lead Soldiers Never Die". Cosmopolitan. October 1950. p. 49.

== Filmography ==
From Hal Roach's Streamliners

- 1942: Dudes Are Pretty People
- 1943: Prairie Chickens
- 1943: Calaboose

Television series

- 1953: Four Star Playhouse episode: A Place Of His Own
- The Unforeseen episode: Mr. Charles

== See also ==
- Corey Ford
- Izaak Walton
- Maxwell Struthers Burt
