= Will Rogers Memorial =

Will Rogers Memorial Museum
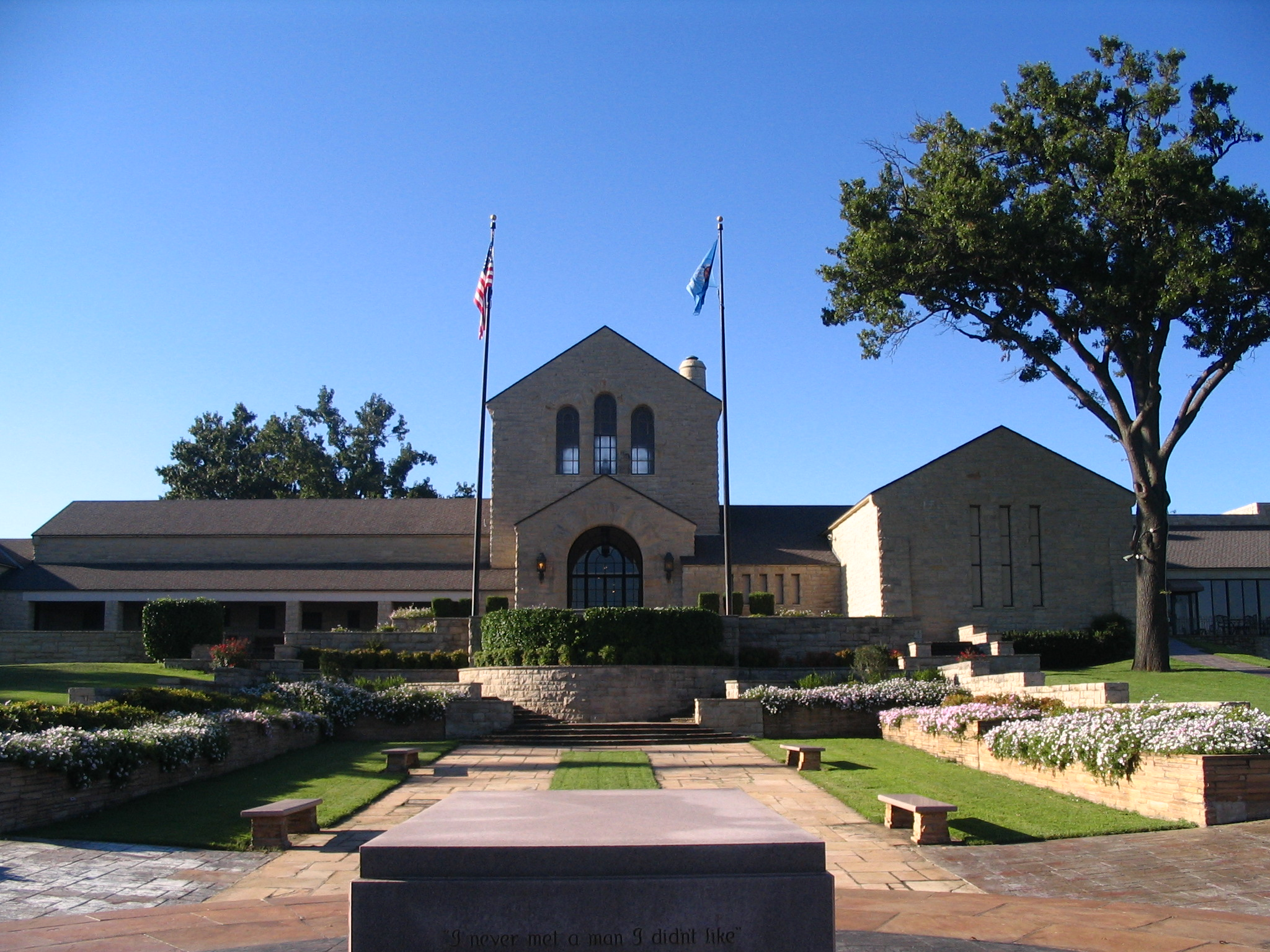
- Established: 1938
- Location: Claremore, Oklahoma
- Coordinates: 36°19′15″N 95°37′54″W
- Type: History and art museum
- Director: Tad Jones
- Website: www.willrogers.com

The Will Rogers Memorial Museum is a 19,052-square-foot (1,770 m^{2}) museum in Claremore, Oklahoma that memorializes entertainer Will Rogers. The museum houses artifacts, memorabilia, photographs, and manuscripts pertaining to Rogers' life, and documentaries, speeches, and movies starring Rogers are shown in a theater. Rogers' tomb is located on its 20-acre (8 ha) grounds overlooking Claremore and Rogers State University.

Until March 7, 2016, the museum was managed by the Will Rogers Memorial Commission, a state agency. On that date, the Governor of Oklahoma signed legislation dissolving the state commission and transferring the property and all its assets to the Oklahoma Historical Society, another state agency.

== History ==
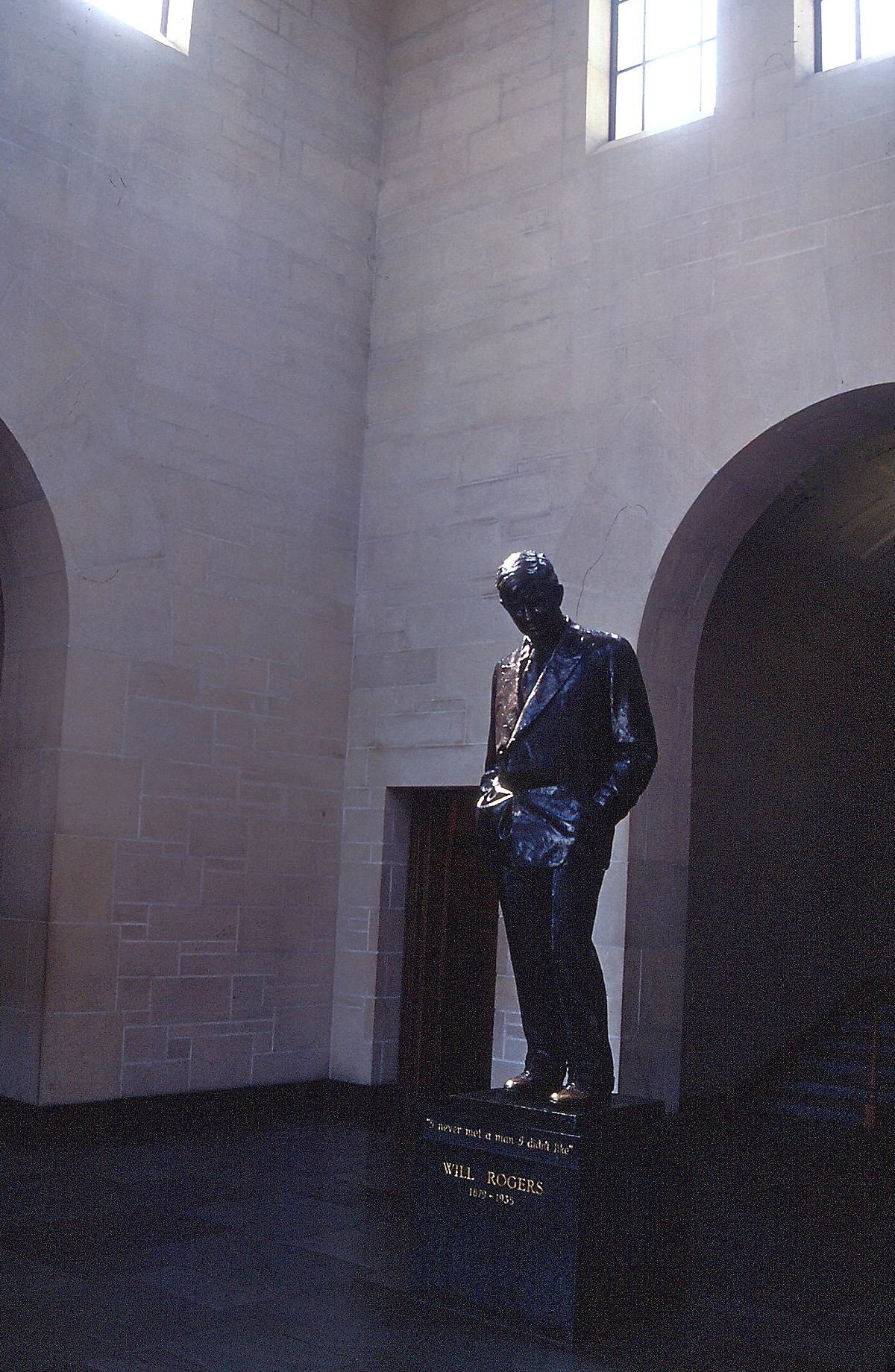
Interior, with Jo Davidson's statue

Will Rogers was born near Oologah, Oklahoma, where his father had settled. He had originally purchased the land the Memorial occupies today in 1911, a plot containing 20 acres (8.1 ha) that overlooks the Tiawah Valley, as a site for his retirement home. The price was reportedly $500 per acre. After his death, it was passed on to members of the Rogers family. Will's widow Betty donated the property in 1937, during the Great Depression, to the state of Oklahoma as the site of a memorial to her husband. She also donated all of Will's papers and many personal effects as the core of the memorial's archives on Rogers

The Oklahoma legislature appropriated $200,000 for the construction of the museum on the site. The original 15,000-square-foot (1,400 m^{2}) limestone building was designed by John Duncan Forsyth. Groundbreaking occurred April 21, 1938, with Will's sister, Sallie Rogers McSpadden, turning the first spadeful of dirt. Construction was completed November 4, 1938, on what would have been Rogers' 59th birthday. The museum opened in 1938, three years after Rogers' death.

An 11,000-square-foot (1,000 m^{2}) addition was constructed in 1983 than added almost double the space for a theater, larger gift shop, offices and archives, and more spacious quarters for displaying the collections, grouped by the various arenas of Rogers' life and career.

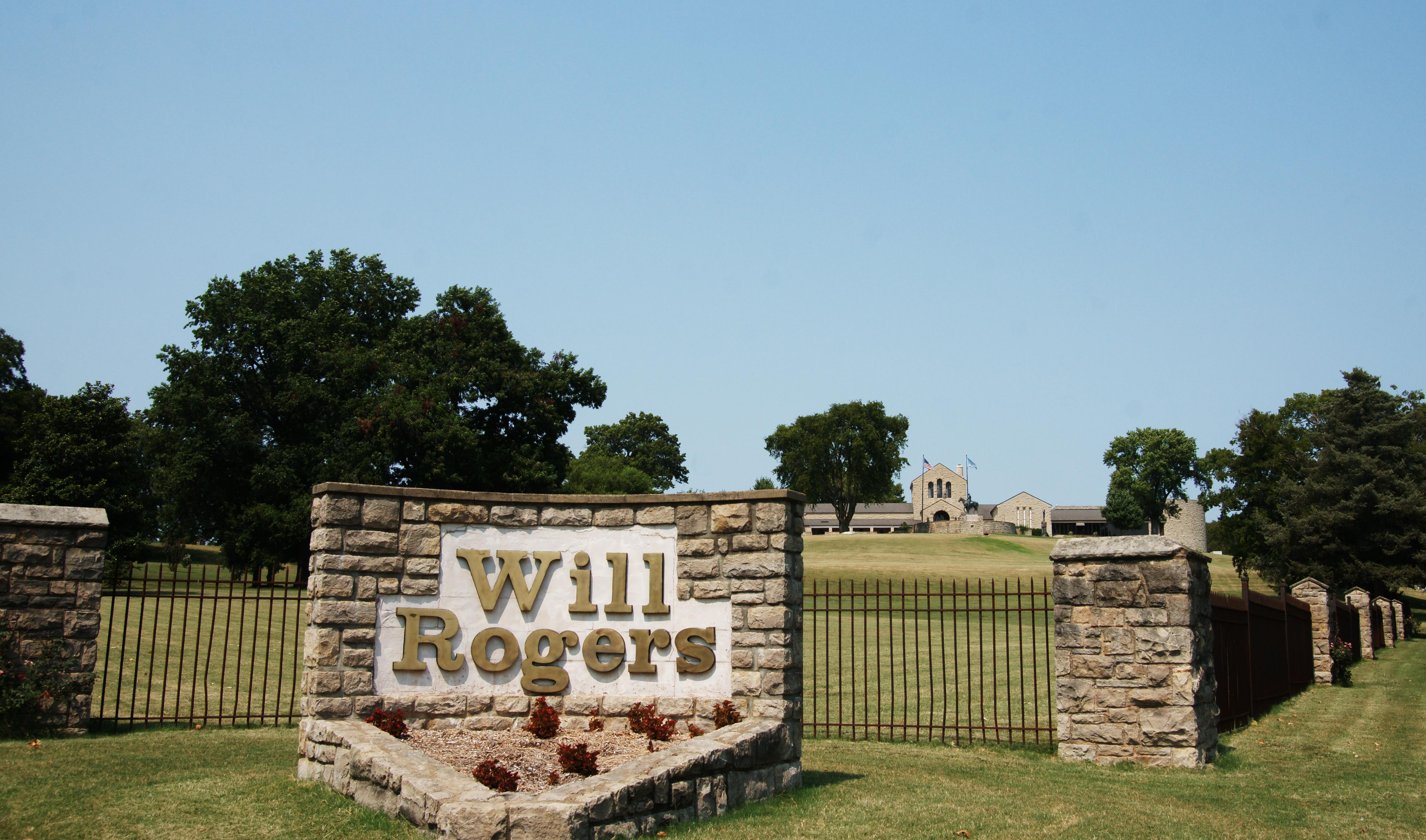
Will Rogers Memorial Museum in Claremore, Oklahoma 2021091100008

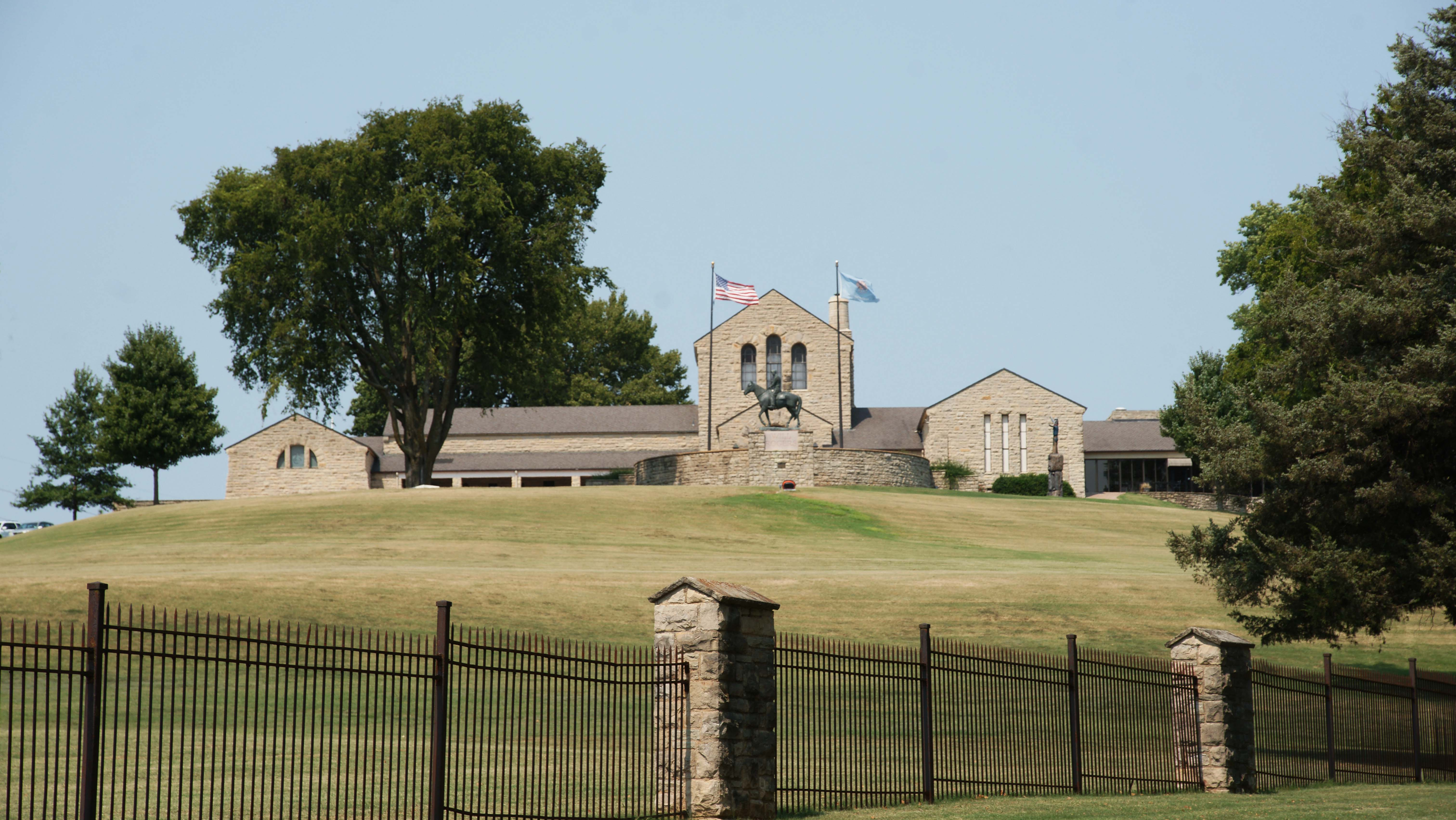
Will Rogers Memorial Museum in Claremore, Oklahoma 2021091100011

== Interior ==
The rotunda contains a famous sculpture of Will Rogers by artist Jo Davidson. The pedestal is inscribed with a famous quotation by Rogers, "...I never met a man I didn't like." The statue is another cast of the work that the artist created in 1938 and which has represented the state in the National Statuary Hall at the United States Capitol.

The 1983 addition includes a large library and offices that serve as research areas for scholars and writers. This area covers 2,400 square feet (220 m^{2}) and holds more than 2000 volumes relevant to Will Rogers, plus other topics such as Indians, genealogy, vaudeville, early motion pictures. and history of the 1879–1935 era. Museum archives also contain an estimated 18,000 photographs, as well as thousands of original manuscripts, private letters, contracts, and personal papers, as well as motion pictures, home movies, and audio tapes.

== Exterior ==
The tomb of Will Rogers is outside the building, and overlooks the city of Claremore. Other family members interred there are Rogers' wife, Betty (1879–1944), three of their four children: Fred Stone Rogers (1918–1920), Mary Amelia Rogers Brooks (1913–1989), and James Blake (Jim) Rogers (1915–2000). Jim's wife, Marguerite Astrea Kemmler Rogers (1917–1987) as well as Jim's oldest son, James Kemmler (Kem) Rogers (1939–2014) are also interred there. (Note: The other child, William Vann Rogers (better known as Will Rogers, Jr.), (1911–1993) died of suicide in Tubac, Arizona and was buried there.)

== Merger with the Oklahoma Historical Society ==
On March 7, 2016, Governor Mary Fallin signed Senate Bill 1570 into law, which put the Will Rogers Memorial Commission, which governed both the Will Rogers Memorial Museum and the Dog Iron Ranch, Will Rogers' birthplace in Oologah, under the control of the Oklahoma Historical Society. The new law became effective immediately.

There was little opposition to the merger, which was unanimously approved by the Joint Appropriations Budget Committees of both the Oklahoma House of Representatives and the Senate. Tad Jones, director of the Memorial, noted that the Memorial had previously been targeted by political budget cutters for several years, and a bill had been introduced during the previous year to eliminate state contributions to the museum. He expressed a belief that the merger would reduce pressure to cut the museum's funding.

The merger was enthusiastically approved by Rogers' descendants, according to Jennifer Rogers-Etcheverry, a member of the Will Rogers Memorial Commission and great-granddaughter of Will Rogers. She said that she saw no disadvantages to the merger. The Act also requires that the governor appoint a direct descendant of Rogers to the OHS board of directors.

== Gallery ==
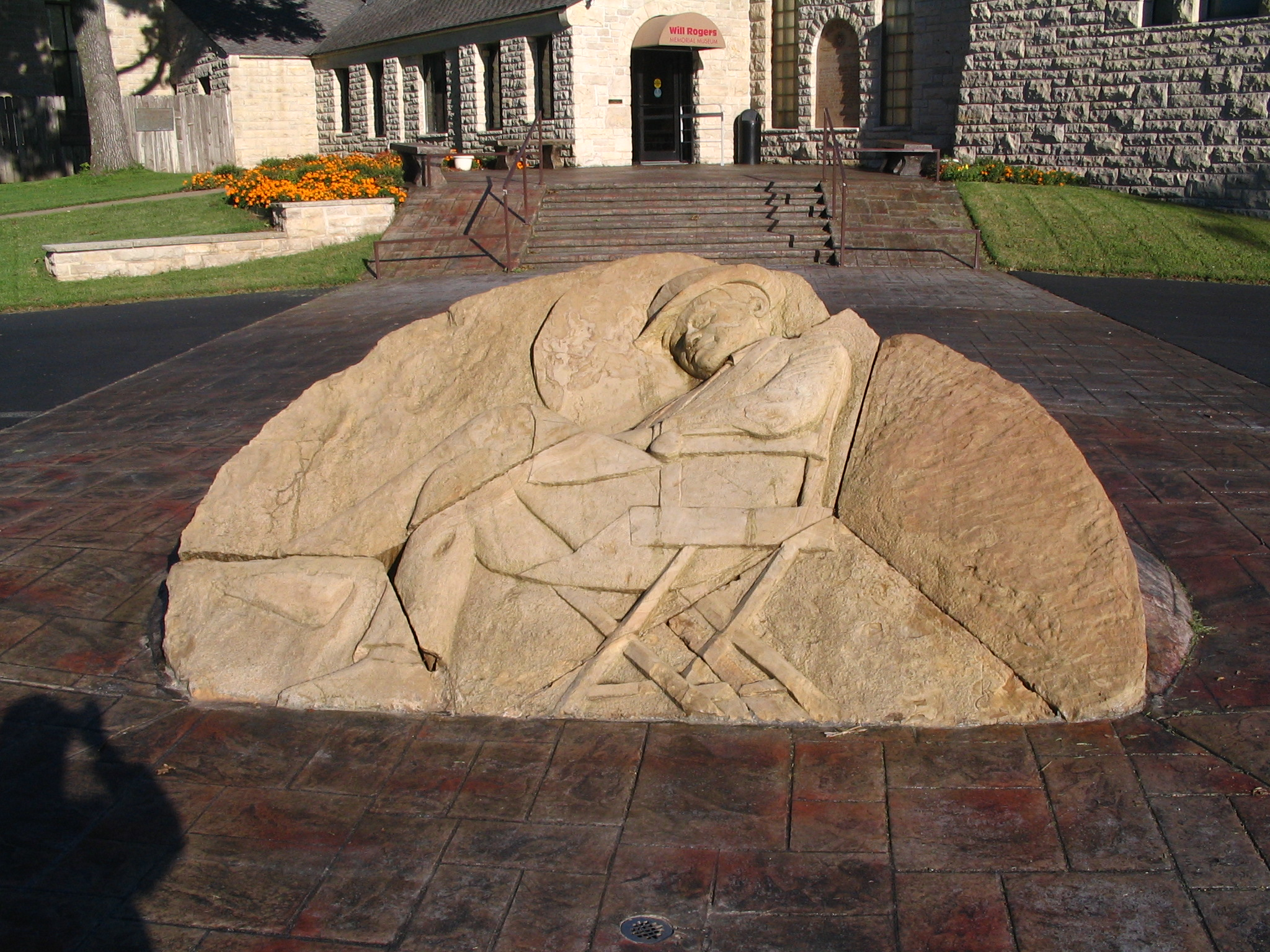
Sculpture in front of the memorial

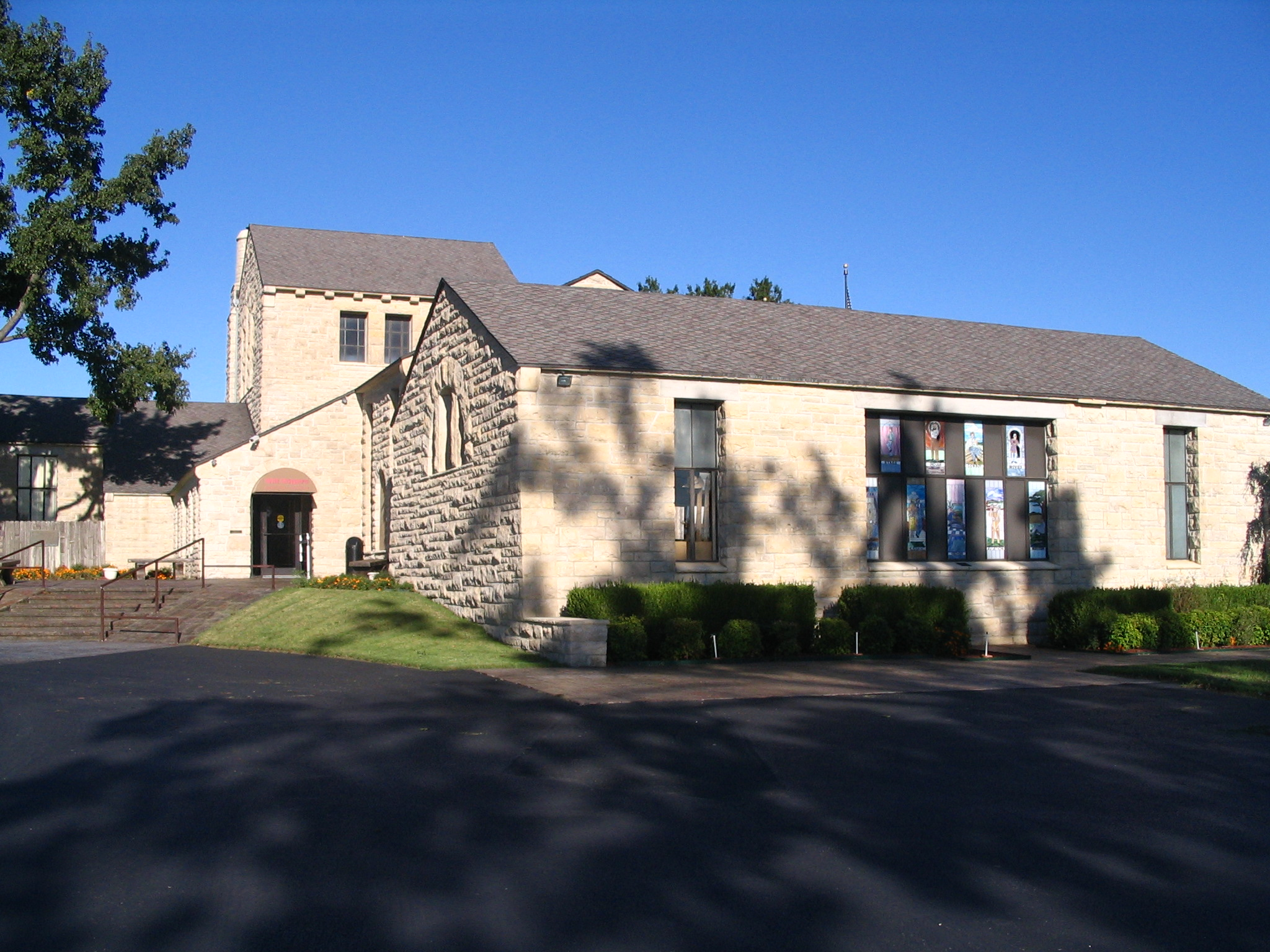
Front side of the museum

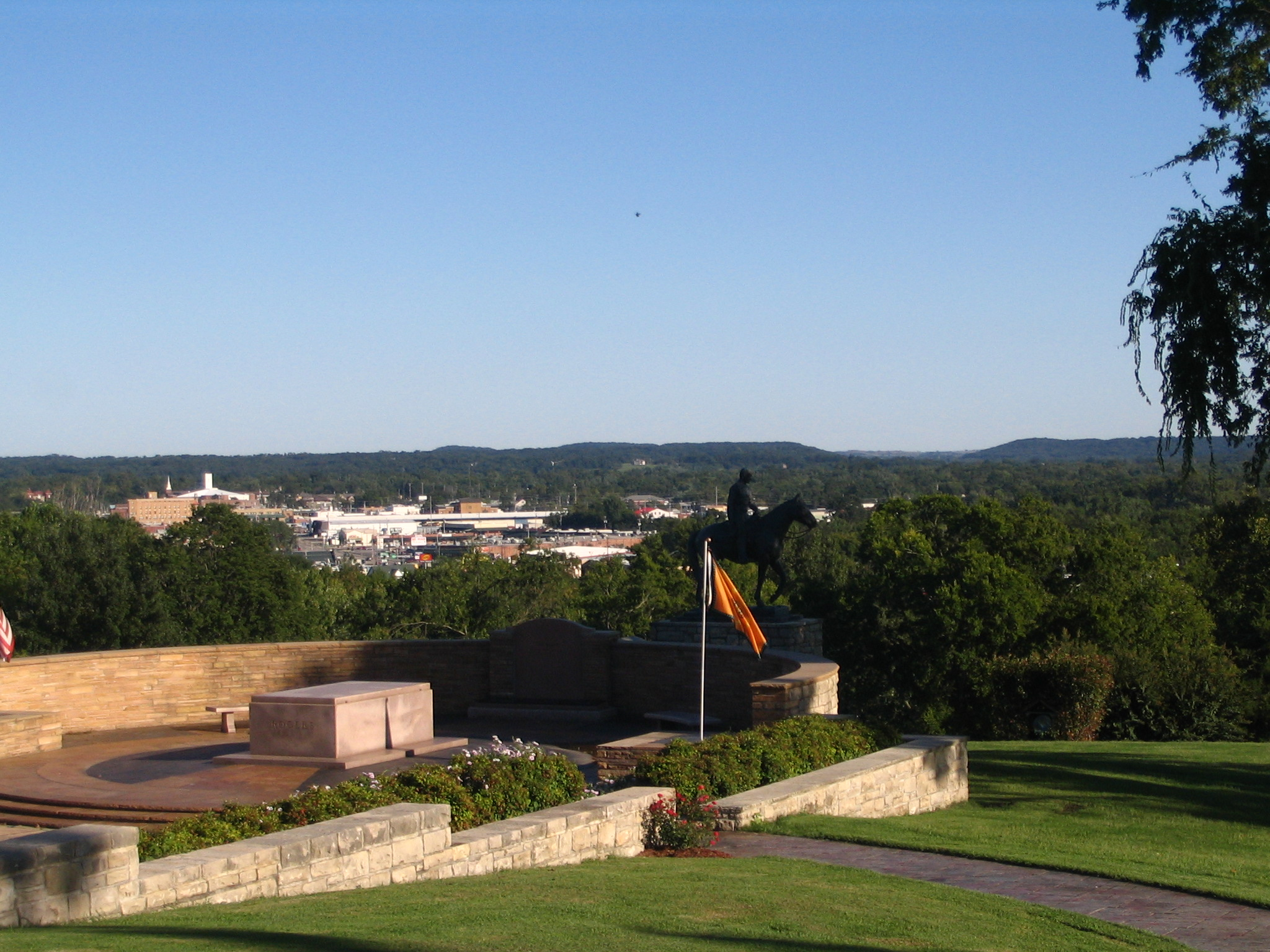
View of Claremore from near Roger's tomb

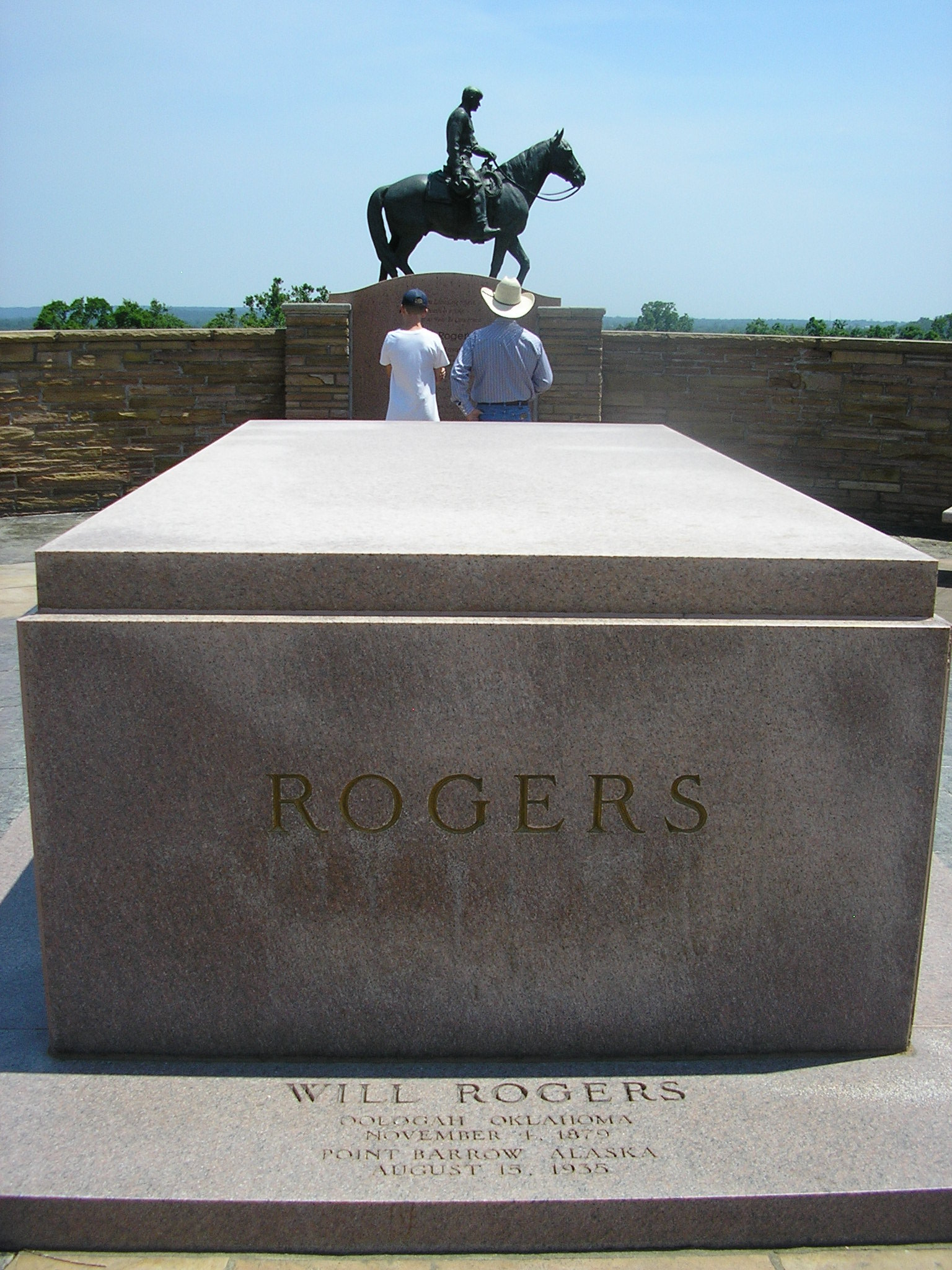
Will Rogers' tomb below statue

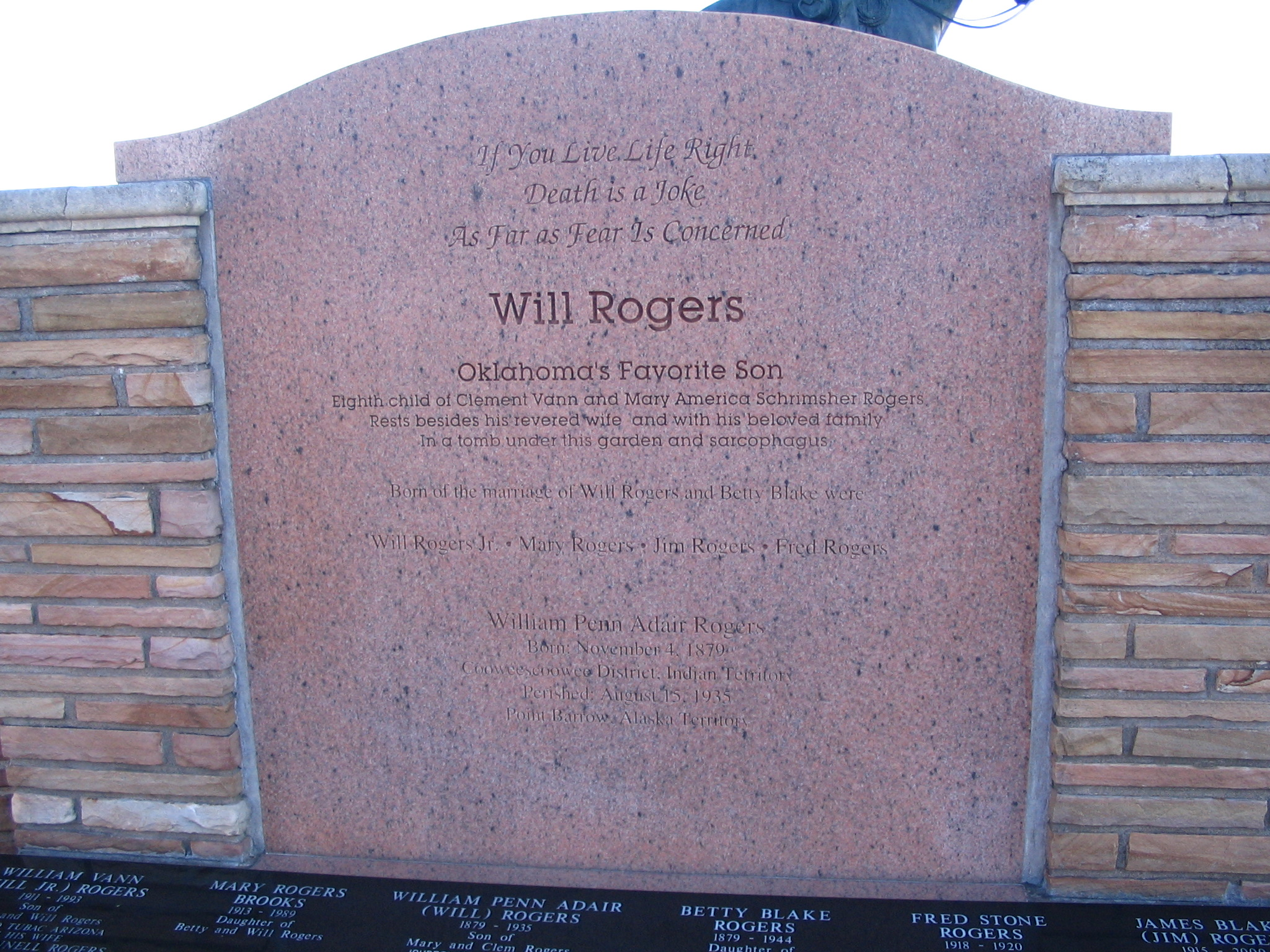
Plaque near the tomb

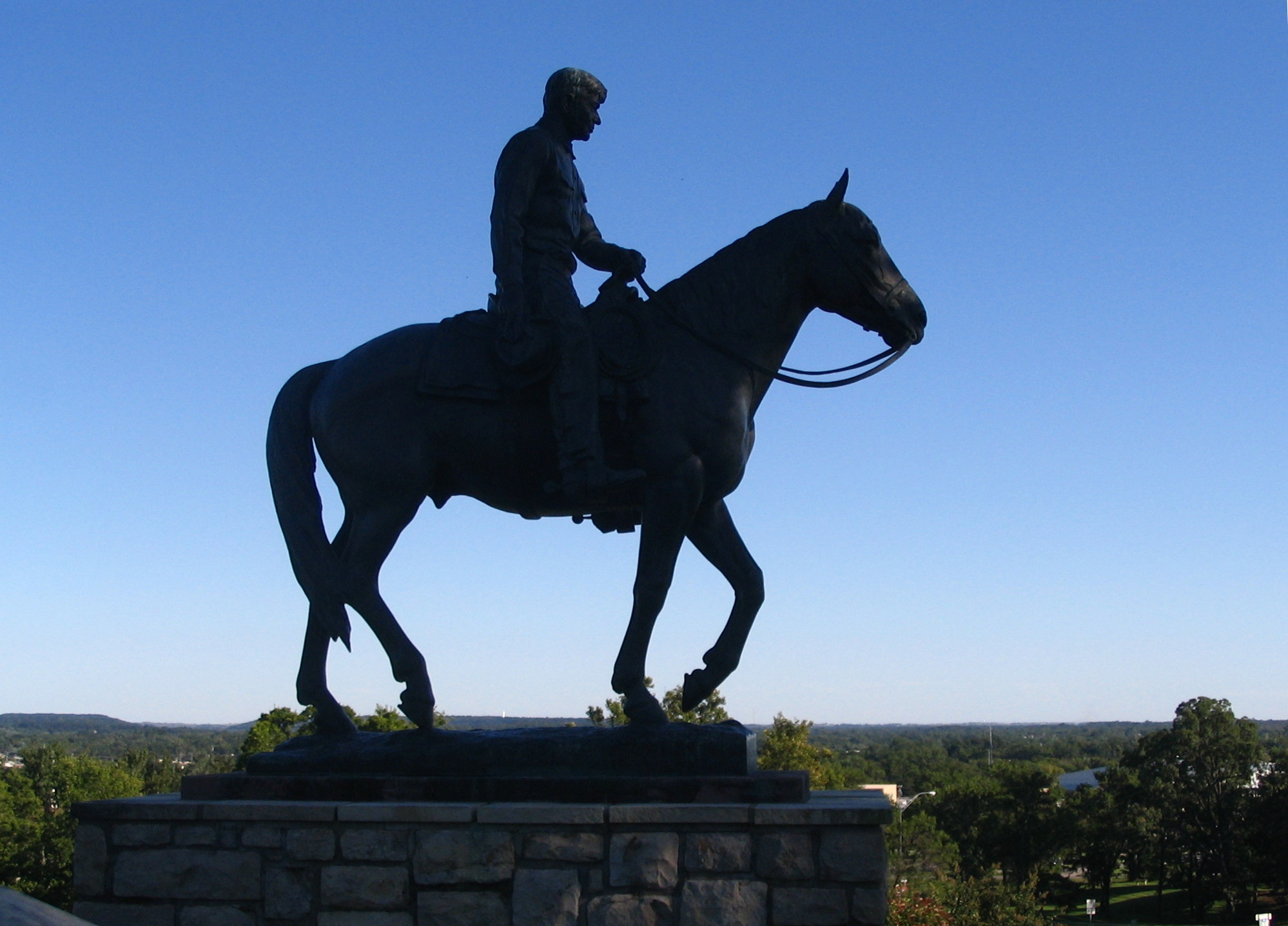
Sculpture of Will Rogers by Electra Waggoner Biggs

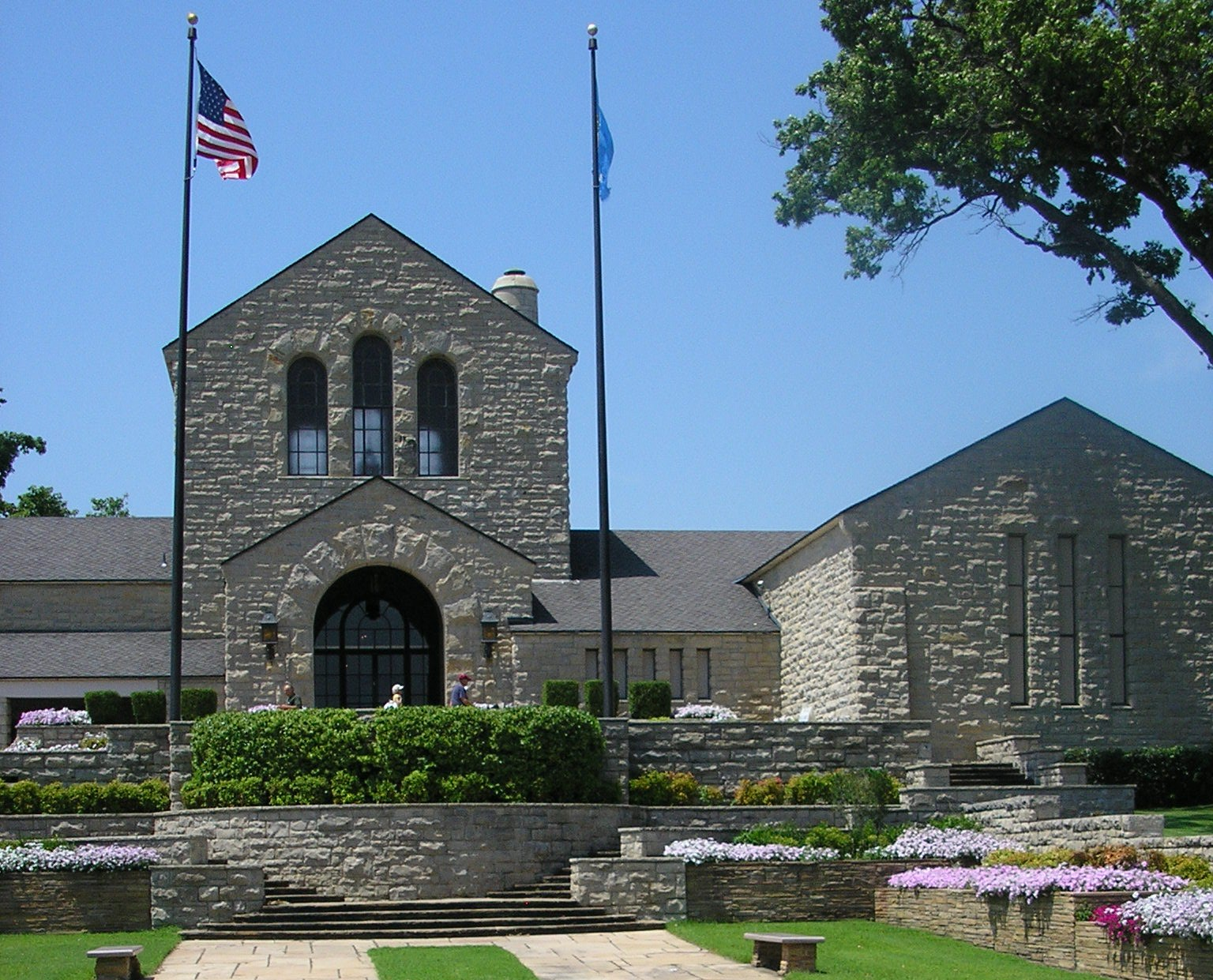
View from tomb

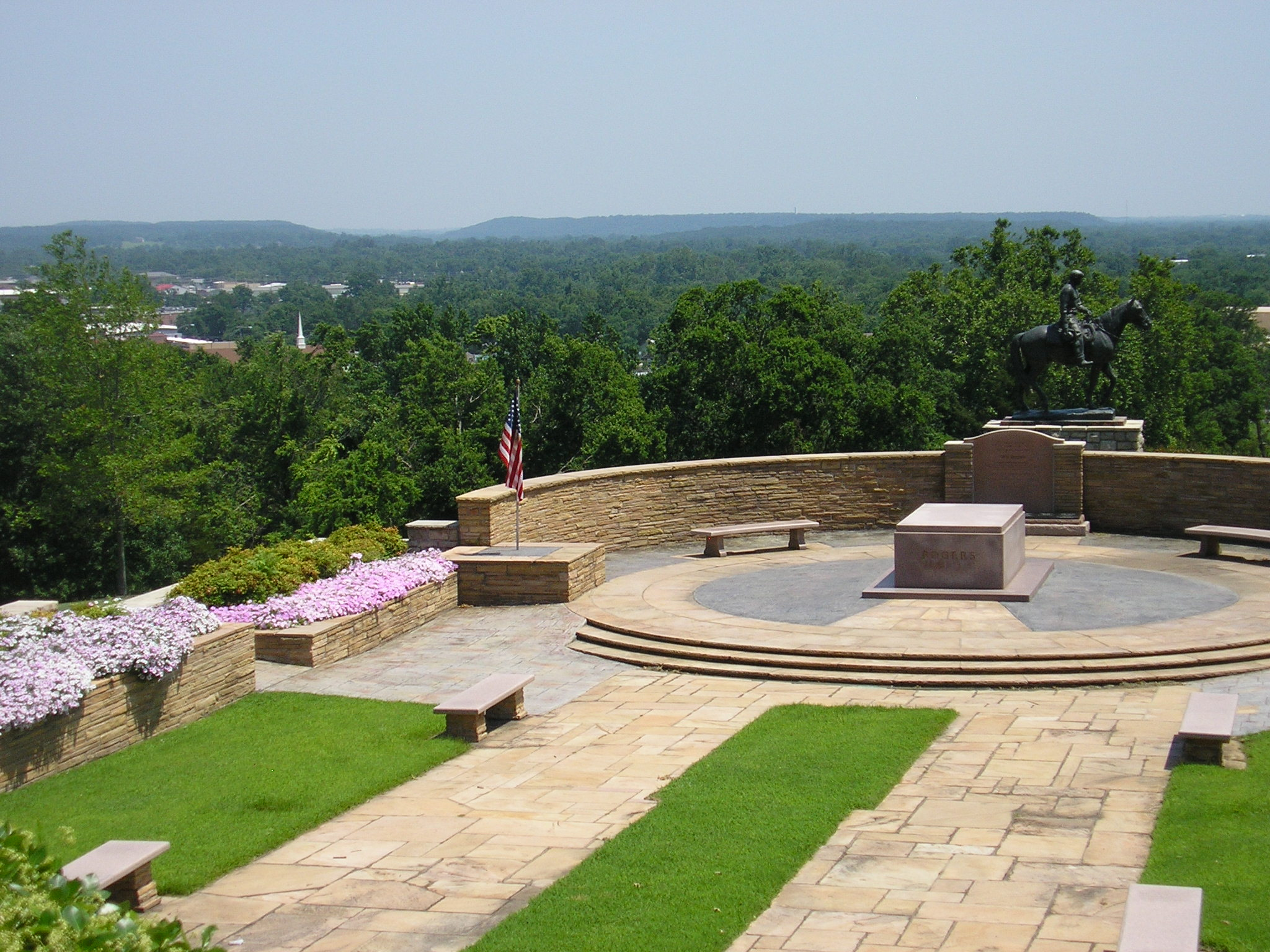
View overlooking tomb

== See also ==
- Dog Iron Ranch (Will Rogers Birthplace)
