= Noah Beery Jr. =

American actor (1913–1994)

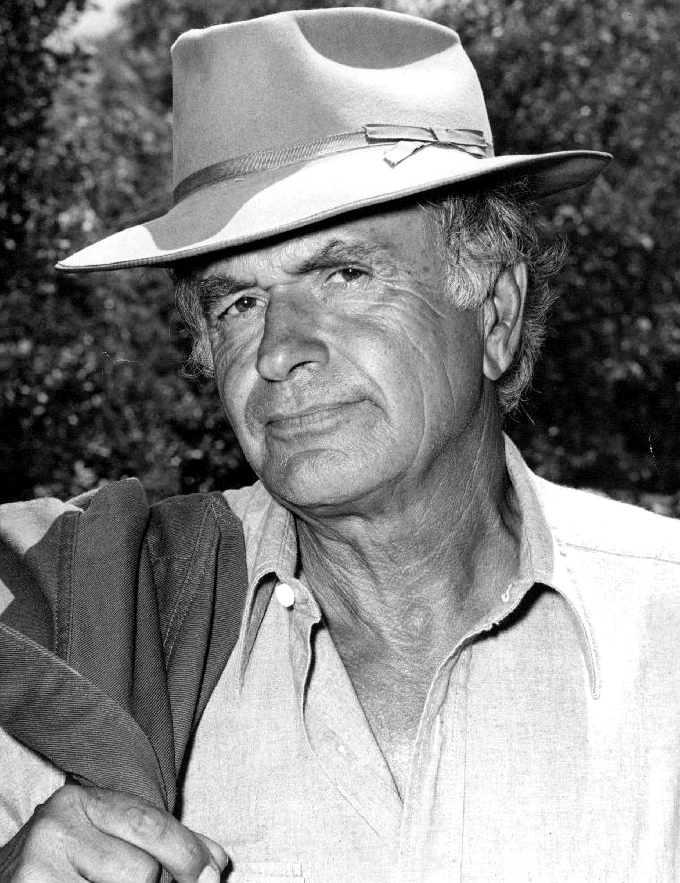
- Beery Jr. in The Rockford Files (1974)
- Born: Noah Lindsey Beery; August 10, 1913; New York City, U.S.
- Died: November 1, 1994 (aged 81); Tehachapi, California, U.S.
- Occupation: Actor
- Years active: 1920–1986
- Spouses: Maxine Jones (m. 1940; div. 1966) Lisa Thorman (m. 1968)
- Children: 3
- Father: Noah Beery Sr.
- Relatives: Wallace Beery (uncle)

Noah Lindsey Beery (August 10, 1913 – November 1, 1994) was an American actor often specializing in warm, friendly character roles similar to many portrayed by his Oscar-winning uncle, Wallace Beery. Unlike his more famous uncle, however, Beery Jr. seldom broke away from playing supporting roles. Active as an actor in films or television for well over half a century, he was best known for playing Joseph "Rocky" Rockford, the father of James Garner's character, James Rockford, in the NBC television series The Rockford Files (1974–1980). His father, Noah Beery, enjoyed a similarly lengthy film career as a supporting actor in major films, although the elder Beery was also frequently a leading man during the silent film era.

== Life and career ==
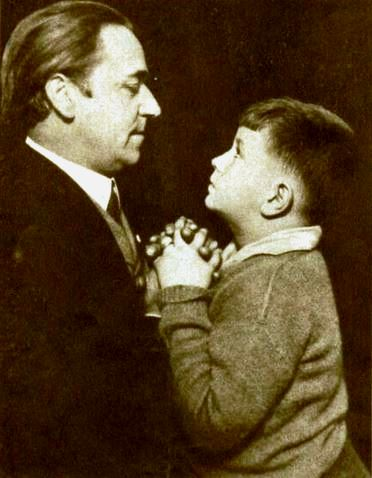
Noah Beery Jr. with his father Noah Beery Sr. in 1922

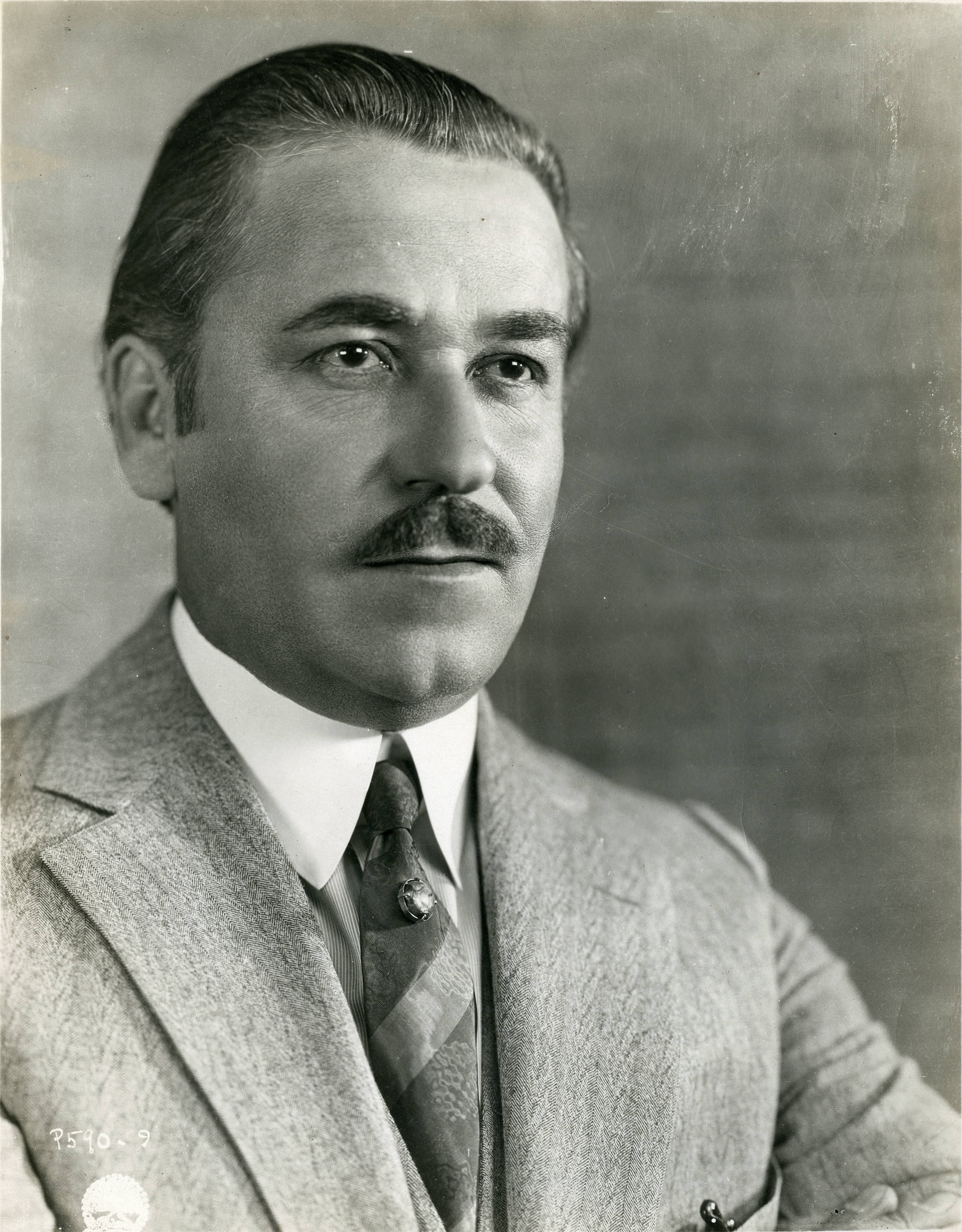
Noah Beery Sr. in 1925

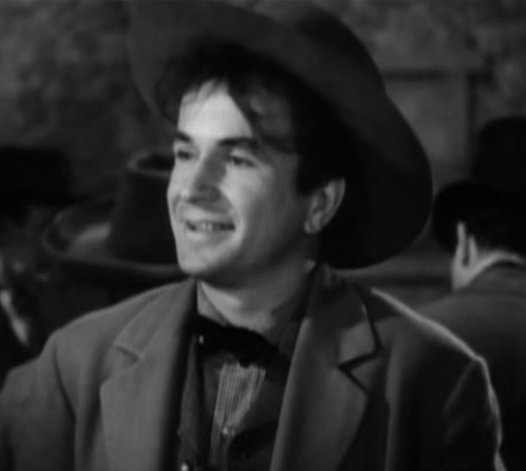
Noah Beery Jr. in 1940

Beery was born in New York City, New York, where his father was working as a stage actor. He was given his nickname "Pidge" by George M. Cohan's sister Josie.

The family moved to California in 1915 when his father began appearing in motion pictures. After attending school in Los Angeles, they moved to a ranch in the San Fernando Valley, a style of living he would maintain for the rest of his life.

At the age of seven, he appeared with his father in The Mark of Zorro and like his father, who immediately began billing himself as "Noah Beery Sr.", he went on to become a respected character actor. His paternal uncle, Oscar-winning actor Wallace Beery, became the world's highest-paid actor by 1932. Although neither Beery Jr. nor his father ever approached that level, both had long and memorable acting careers. The three acting Beerys physically closely resembled each other, but Noah Beery Jr. lacked the powerful voice his father and uncle possessed.

Beery appeared in dozens of films, including a large early role as John Wayne's action partner in The Trail Beyond (1934; Wayne was 27 years old and Beery was 21), Only Angels Have Wings (1939) with Cary Grant, 20 Mule Team (1940) with his uncle Wallace Beery, and Red River (1948), again with John Wayne as well as Montgomery Clift.

Beery's early television work included a weekly stint as Joey the Clown in Circus Boy with Micky Dolenz in the mid-1950s. In 1960, Beery replaced Burt Reynolds as the co-starring sidekick on Riverboat, an NBC Western series starring Darren McGavin.

He appeared once on the religion anthology series Crossroads and on Walter Brennan's ABC sitcom, The Real McCoys. He guest-starred three times on the long-running NBC Western series The Virginian in the 1960s, and twice during the same era on Wagon Train. In 1965, he made two guest appearances on Perry Mason ("The Case of the Golden Venom" and "The Case of the Hasty Honeymooner").

Beery portrayed the buckskin-clad recurring sidekick character "Buffalo Baker" in the 17-episode 1967 television series Hondo starring Ralph Taeger, a role played by Ward Bond in the original 3D John Wayne film. In 1970 Beery appeared as Will Baxter on the TV western The Virginian. But Beery remains best known for his role as Joseph "Rocky" Rockford, the amiable but occasionally cantankerous father of Jim Rockford, James Garner's character on The Rockford Files (1974–1980).

== Personal life ==
Beery Jr.'s first wife until 1966 was Maxine Jones, the only child of Western star Buck Jones. His second wife from 1968 until his death was Lisa (née Thorman). He had two daughters, Muffett and Melissa; a son, actor Bucklind Beery; and three step-children, Page and Sean Slattery and Lerena Barbe.

On February 8, 1960, he received a star located at 7047 Hollywood Blvd. on the Hollywood Walk of Fame for his contributions to the television industry.

== Death ==
Beery died on November 1, 1994, in Tehachapi, California of a cerebral thrombosis, aged 81. He was interred in Forest Lawn Memorial Park.

== Filmography ==
- The Mutiny of the Elsinore (1920) as Boy (uncredited)
- The Mark of Zorro (1920) (with Douglas Fairbanks Sr. and Noah Beery Sr.) as Boy (uncredited)
- Penrod (1922) (uncredited)
- Gold Diggers of Broadway (1929) as Stage Boy (uncredited)
- Showgirl in Hollywood (1930) as Himself – Cameo Appearance at Premiere (uncredited)
- Renegades (1930) as Young Legionnaire (uncredited)
- Heroes of the West (1932) as Noah Blaine
- Jungle Mystery (1932) as Fred Oakes
- Rustlers' Roundup (1933) as Danny Brand
- The Three Musketeers (1933, Serial) (with John Wayne) as Stubbs [Chs. 1–2, 10]
- Fighting with Kit Carson (1933) (with Noah Beery Sr.) as Nakomas
- Viva Villa! (1934) (scenes deleted)
- The Trail Beyond (1934) (with John Wayne and Noah Beery Sr.) as Wabi
- Tailspin Tommy (1934, Serial) as Skeeter Milligan
- Five Bad Men (1935) as Gene Taggart
- Devil's Canyon (1935)
- The Call of the Savage (1935, Serial) as Jan Trevor
- Stormy (1935) as Stormy
- Tailspin Tommy in the Great Air Mystery (1935, Serial) as Skeeter Milligan
- Parole! (1936) as Bobby Freeman
- Ace Drummond (1936, Serial) as Jerry
- The Mighty Treve (1937) as Bud McClelland
- The Road Back (1937) as Wessling
- Trouble at Midnight (1937) as Kirk Cameron
- Some Blondes Are Dangerous (1937) as Bud Mason
- Forbidden Valley (1938) as Ring Hazzard
- Girls' School (1938) as George
- The Strange Case of Dr. Meade (1938) as Mart
- Only Angels Have Wings (1939) (with Cary Grant and Jean Arthur) as Joe Souther
- Bad Lands (1939) as Chick Lyman
- Flight at Midnight (1939) as 'Torpy' McDonald
- Parents on Trial (1939) as Jerry Kearns
- Of Mice and Men (1939) (with Burgess Meredith and Lon Chaney Jr.) as Whit
- The Light of Western Stars (1940) as Poco
- 20 Mule Team (1940) (with Wallace Beery and Anne Baxter) as Mitch
- Passport to Alcatraz (1940) as Ray Nolan
- The Carson City Kid (1940) as Scott 'Arizona' Warren
- Riders of Death Valley (1941, Serial) as Smokey
- Sergeant York (1941) (with Gary Cooper, Walter Brennan, and Joan Leslie) as Buck Lipscomb
- Two in a Taxi (1941) (with Anita Louise) as Sandy Connors
- Tanks a Million (1941) as Charlie Cobb
- All-American Co-Ed (1941) as Slinky
- Hay Foot (1942) as Sgt. Charlie Cobb
- Dudes Are Pretty People (1942, Short) as Pidge Crosby
- Overland Mail (1942, Serial) (with Lon Chaney Jr. and Noah Beery Sr.) as Sierra Pete
- 'Neath Brooklyn Bridge (1942) as Butch
- Calaboose (1943) (with Mary Brian) as Pidge Crosby
- Prairie Chickens (1943) (with Raymond Hatton) as Pidge Crosby
- We've Never Been Licked (1943) (with Richard Quine, William Frawley and Robert Mitchum) as Cyanide Jenkins
- Frontier Badmen (1943) (with Robert Paige, Anne Gwynne, Diana Barrymore and Lon Chaney Jr.) as Jim Cardwell
- Top Man (1943) as Ed Thompson
- Corvette K-225 (1943) as Stone
- Gung Ho!: The Story of Carlson's Makin Island Raiders (1943) (with Randolph Scott and Robert Mitchum) as Kurt Richter
- Week-End Pass (1944) as Johnny Adams
- Follow the Boys (1944) (with George Raft, Orson Welles, and Marlene Dietrich) as Himself (uncredited)
- Allergic to Love (1944) as Kip Henderson
- Hi, Beautiful (1944) as Jeff Peters
- Under Western Skies (1945) as Tod Howell
- Her Lucky Night (1945) (with The Andrews Sisters) as Larry
- See My Lawyer (1945) as Arthur Lane
- The Beautiful Cheat (1945) as Prof. Alexander Haven
- The Crimson Canary (1945) as Danny Brooks
- The Daltons Ride Again (1945) (with Lon Chaney Jr.) as Ben Dalton
- The Cat Creeps (1946) as Pidge 'Flash' Laurie
- Red River (1948) (with John Wayne and Montgomery Clift) as Buster McGee
- Indian Agent (1948) as Chief Red Fox
- The Doolins of Oklahoma (1949) as Little Bill
- Davy Crockett, Indian Scout (1950) as Tex McGee
- The Savage Horde (1950) as Glenn Larrabee
- Rocketship X-M (1950) (with Lloyd Bridges) as Maj. William Corrigan
- Two Flags West (1950) as Cy Davis
- The Last Outpost (1951, aka Cavalry Charge) (with Ronald Reagan) as Sgt. Calhoun
- The Texas Rangers (1951) as Buff Smith
- The Cimarron Kid (1952) (with Audie Murphy) as Bob Dalton
- Wagons West (1952) (with Rod Cameron) as Arch Lawrence
- The Story of Will Rogers (1952) (with Will Rogers Jr. and Jane Wyman) as Wiley Post
- Tropic Zone (1953) (with Ronald Reagan and Rhonda Fleming) as Tapachula Sam
- Wings of the Hawk (1953) as Pascual Orozco
- War Arrow (1953) (with Maureen O'Hara and Jeff Chandler) as Sgt. Augustus Wilks
- The Yellow Tomahawk (1954) as Tonio Perez
- The Black Dakotas (1954) as Gimpy Joe Woods
- White Feather (1955) (with Robert Wagner and Jeffrey Hunter) as Lt. Ferguson
- Jubal (1956) (with Ernest Borgnine and Glenn Ford) as Sam – Horgan Rider
- The Fastest Gun Alive (1956) as Dink Wells, Bank Robber
- Decision at Sundown (1957) (with Randolph Scott) as Sam
- Escort West (1959) as Lt. Jamison
- Guns of the Timberland (1960) as Blackie
- Inherit the Wind (1960) (with Spencer Tracy and Fredric March) as John Stebbins
- 7 Faces of Dr. Lao (1964) as Tim Mitchell
- Incident at Phantom Hill (1966) (with Robert Fuller and Dan Duryea) as O'Rourke
- Journey to Shiloh (1968) as Sgt. Mercer Barnes
- Heaven with a Gun (1969) (with Glenn Ford) as Garvey
- The Cockeyed Cowboys of Calico County (1970) as Eddie
- Little Fauss and Big Halsy (1970) (with Robert Redford, Michael J. Pollard, and Lauren Hutton) as Seally Fauss
- Hacksaw (1971) as Narrator
- 43: The Richard Petty Story (1972) as Julie
- Walking Tall (1973) (with Joe Don Baker and Elizabeth Hartman) as Grandpa
- The Spikes Gang (1974) (with Lee Marvin and Gary Grimes) as Basset
- Walking Tall Part II (1975) as Carl Pusser
- The Ghost of Cypress Swamp (1977) as Doc Manners
- The Bastard (1978, TV movie) (with Andrew Stevens and Kim Cattrall) as Dan O'Brien
- The Great American Traffic Jam (1980, TV movie) as Barney
- The Big Stuffed Dog (1981, TV movie) as Petey's Grandfather
- The Best Little Whorehouse in Texas (1982) (with Burt Reynolds and Dolly Parton) as Edsel
- Waltz Across Texas (1982) (with Anne Archer) as Joe Locker

== Television ==
- The Adventures of Rin-Tin-Tin (TV series) - (1954)
- Circus Boy (TV series) – series – Joey (1956–1957)
- Rawhide – episode: "Incident of the Chubasco" – Arkansas (1959)
- The Real McCoys – episode: "The Investors" – Claude McCoy (1961)
- Wagon Train – episode: "The Jonas Murdock Story" – Jonas Murdock (1960)
- Wagon Train – episode: "Path of the Serpent" – Ruddy Blaine (1961)
- Wanted: Dead or Alive – episode: "El Gato" – El Gato (1961)
- Wanted: Dead or Alive – episode: "Barney's Bounty" – Barney Durant (1961)
- Route 66 – episode: "1800 Days to Justice" – Emlyn Job (1962)
- Gunsmoke – episode: S9E18 "Prairie Wolfer" (1964)
- Wagon Train – episode: "The Kate Crawley Story" – Stump Beasley (1964)
- Bonanza – episode: "Lotherio Larkin – Lotherio Larkin (1965)
- Perry Mason – episode: "The Case of the Hasty Honeymooner" - Lucas Tolliver (1965)
- Gunsmoke – episode: S11E24 "Honor Before Justice" (1966)
- Lassie – episode: "Danger Mountain" (Season 13) - Carl Bryan (1966)
- Laredo – episode: "A Taste of Money" – Ezekiel Fry (1966)
- Combat! – episode: "A Little Jazz" – Hank (1967)
- Hondo – 17 episodes - Buffalo Baker (1967)
- Bonanza – episode: "The Crime of Johnny Mule" – Johnny Mule (1968)
- Alias Smith and Jones – episode: "Something to Get Hung About" – Sheriff (1971)
- Police Story – episode: "The Big Walk" – Hecker (1973)
- The Six Million Dollar Man – episode: "Run, Steve, Run" – Tom Molson (1974)
- The Waltons – episode: "The Heritage" – Charlie Harmon (1974)
- The Rockford Files – 121 episodes – Joseph "Rocky" Rockford (1974–1980)
- The Six Million Dollar Man – episode: "The Bionic Badge" – Officer Banner (1976)
- Ellery Queen – episode: "The Adventure of the Sinister Scenario" – Lionel Briggs (1976)
- Greatest Heroes of the Bible – episode: "The Story of Esther" – Mordechai (1979)
- Eight Is Enough – episode: "Marriage and other Flights of Fancy" (1979)
- The Love Boat – episodes: "Celebration; Captain Papa"; "Honeymoon Pressure" (1980)
- Vega$ – episode: "Sourdough Suite" – Josiah Sparks (1981)
- Magnum, P.I. – episode: "All Roads Lead to Floyd" – Floyd Lewellen (1981)
- Fantasy Island – episode: "High Off the Hog/Reprisal" – Otis T. Boggs (1981)
- Beyond Witch Mountain (with Eddie Albert) – Uncle Ben (1982)
- The Yellow Rose – 22 episodes – Luther Dillard (1983–1984)
- Cover Up – episode: "Nothing to Lose" – Graham (1984)
- Murder, She Wrote – episode: "Funeral at Fifty-Mile" – Doc Wallace (1985)
- Trapper John, M.D. – episode: "Buckaroo Bob Rides Again" – Buckaroo Bob Morgan (1985)
- The Love Boat – episode: "Hello, Emily/The Tour Guide/The Winning Number" – Daryl Wilcox (1986)
- Bewitched – episode: "We're in for a Bad Spell" (Season 2) - office worker (1965)
