= Arthur Frank Wertheim =

American scholar (1935–2020)

- Born: December 22, 1935; New York City, U.S.
- Died: November 24, 2020 (aged 84); Los Angeles, California, U.S.
- Education: Yale University.; New York University
- Known for: Comedy history
- Spouse: Ruth Weisberg

Arthur Frank Wertheim (December 22, 1935 – November 24, 2020) was a scholar in the United States.

== Early life ==
Arthur Frank Wertheim was born in New York City on December 22, 1935, to Ruth (née Weisberg) and Albert Wertheim, a stockbroker. Wertheim attended the Webb School of California in Claremont, California.

In 1957, Werthheim received a B.A. from Yale University. At New York University Werthheim received an M.A. in 1967 and a Ph.D. in 1970.

== Career ==
From 1971 to 1978 Wertheim was an assistant professor of American Studies at the University of Southern California, Los Angeles. Werthheim went to the University of Indonesia, Jakarta where he was a Fulbright professor of American studies for one year, 1978–79. He then was Director of Development Communications within University Relations at the University of California, Los Angeles.

== Personal life and death ==
Wertheim married Carol J. Youngberg, on February 4, 1972, later, a social science teacher at Roosevelt Junior High School in Glendale, and had a son, Jason Albert. and lived in Silver Lake.

Wertheim died ion Los Angeles, California on November 24, 2020, at the age of 84.

== Works ==
- Wertheim, Arthur Frank (1976). The New York Little Renaissance: Iconoclasm, Modernism, and Nationalism in American Culture, 1908-1917. New York University Press. ISBN 978-0-8147-9164-6.
- Wertheim, Arthur Frank (1984). American Popular Culture: A Historical Bibliography. ABC-Clio Information Services. ISBN 978-0-87436-049-3.
- Wertheim, Arthur Frank (October 22, 1992). Radio Comedy. Oxford University Press. ISBN 0-19-502481-8.
- Rogers, Will (1992). Wertheim, Arthur Frank (ed.). Will Rogers at the Ziegfeld Follies. University of Oklahoma Press. ISBN 978-0-8061-2357-8.
- Arthur Frank Wertheim, Barbara Bair 1996 The Papers of Will Rogers: The early years, November 1879-April 1904
- Arthur Frank Wertheim, Barbara Bair 1996 The Papers of Will Rogers: Wild West and vaudeville, April 1904-September 1908
- Arthur Frank Wertheim, Barbara Bair 1996 The Papers of Will Rogers: From vaudeville to Broadway : September 1908-August 1915
- Arthur Frank Wertheim, Barbara Bair 1996 The Papers of Will Rogers: From the Broadway stage to the national stage, September 1915-July 1928
- Arthur Frank Wertheim, Barbara Bair 1996 The Papers of Will Rogers: The final years, August 1928-August 1935
- Wertheim, Arthur Frank (February 11, 2009). Vaudeville Wars: How the Keith-Albee and Orpheum Circuits Controlled the Big-Time and Its Performers. Palgrave Macmillan US. ISBN 978-0-230-61136-8.
- Wertheim, Arthur Frank (November 9, 2016). W. C. Fields from Burlesque and Vaudeville to Broadway: Becoming a Comedian. Springer. ISBN 978-1-137-30067-6.
- Wertheim, Arthur Frank (January 16, 2017). W.C. Fields from the Ziegfeld Follies and Broadway Stage to the Screen: Becoming a Character Comedian. Springer. ISBN 9781349949861.
- Wertheim, Arthur Frank (2020). The Silent Movies of W. C. Fields: How They Created The Basis for His Fame in Sound Films. BearManor Media. ISBN 9781629335926.
- Wertheim, Arthur Frank (January 21, 2019). W. C. Fields from Sound Film and Radio Comedy to Stardom: Becoming a Cultural Icon. Palgrave Macmillan UK. ISBN 978-1-137-47329-5.
