= Calaboose (film) =

1943 film

- Theatrical poster
- Directed by: Hal Roach Jr.
- Written by: Donald Hough; Arnold Belgard
- Produced by: Glenn Tryon
- Starring: Jimmy Rogers; Noah Beery Jr. Mary Brian
- Distributed by: United Artists
- Release date: January 29, 1943
- Running time: 45 minutes

Calaboose is a 1943 American Western film directed by Hal Roach Jr. It stars Jimmy Rogers, Mary Brian and Noah Beery Jr.

It is a sequel to Dudes are Pretty People (1942), a featurette from "Hal Roach's Streamliners" which is a series of approximately 50-minute comedic movies. The film runs 45 minutes. Another sequel followed later the same year, with Rogers and Beery playing the same characters, entitled Prairie Chickens.

== Cast ==
- Jimmy Rogers as Jim
- Noah Beery Jr. as Pidge Crosby
- Mary Brian as Doris Lane
- William Henry as Tom Pendergrast (billed as Bill Henry)
- Paul Hurst as Bartender Ed
- Marc Lawrence as Sluggsy Baker
- William B. Davidson as Sheriff George Lane (billed as William Davidson)
- Jean Porter as Major Barbara
- Iris Adrian as Gert
