= Hal Roach Jr. =

American film and television producer (1918–1972)

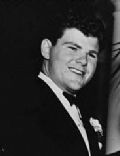
- Born: Harold Eugene Roach Jr. June 15, 1918; Los Angeles, California, U.S.
- Died: March 29, 1972 (aged 53); Santa Monica, California, U.S.
- Resting place: Calvary Cemetery, East Los Angeles
- Occupation: Producer
- Spouse: Alva Brewer (m. 1940)
- Children: 2
- Parents: Hal Roach Sr. (father); Marguerite Nichols (mother)
- Relatives: Margaret Roach (sister)

Harold Eugene Roach Jr. (June 15, 1918 – March 29, 1972) was an American film and television producer.

== Biography ==
Roach Jr. was born in Los Angeles, the son of comedy producer Hal Roach and actress Marguerite Nichols. Roach Jr. co-directed One Million B.C. with his father.

Roach was president of the Hal Roach Studios for some time, but was ousted in 1959 when he and Alexander Guterma, who attempted to create an empire of the studio, Mutual Broadcasting System, and others, were both indicted on federal securities violations.

Roach married Alva Brewer in 1940, with whom he had two children.

== Death ==
Roach produced individual episodes of many early television series but no well-known films aside from those directly involving his father. He died on March 29, 1972, at the age of 53 after falling ill with pneumonia (as did his mother). His father outlived him by 20 years, dying in 1992 at age 100. Roach is buried in Calvary Cemetery, East Los Angeles.
