= Down on the Farm (1938 film) =

1938 film by Malcolm St. Clair

- Directed by: Malcolm St. Clair
- Written by: Homer Croy; Robert Ellis; Frank Fenton; Helen Logan; Lynn Root
- Produced by: John Stone
- Starring: Jed Prouty; Spring Byington; Louise Fazenda
- Cinematography: Edward Snyder
- Edited by: Harry Reynolds
- Music by: Samuel Kaylin
- Production company: Twentieth Century Fox
- Distributed by: Twentieth Century Fox
- Release date: October 11, 1938
- Running time: 61 minutes
- Country: United States
- Language: English

Down on the Farm is a 1938 American comedy film directed by Malcolm St. Clair and starring Jed Prouty, Spring Byington and Louise Fazenda. It was part of Twentieth Century Fox's Jones Family series. The family go to stay at their aunt's farm.

The film's sets were designed by the art directors Bernard Herzbrun and Boris Leven.

== Plot ==
The Jones Family visit John Jones’ aunt who lives on a country farm. Various romances ensue, and John wins a cornhusking contest. John is kidnapped by con men and is rescued by son Roger. State politics are satirized “as are the ineptitudes of city people" who are ignorant of country ways.

== Cast ==
- Jed Prouty as John Jones
- Spring Byington as Mrs. John Jones
- Louise Fazenda as Aunt Ida
- Russell Gleason as Herbert Thompson
- Kenneth Howell as Jack Jones
- George Ernest as Roger Jones
- June Carlson as Lucy Jones
- Florence Roberts as Granny Jones
- Billy Mahan as Bobby Jones
- Eddie Collins as Cyrus Sampson
- Dorris Bowdon as Tessie Moody
- Roberta Smith as Emma Moody
- Marvin Stephens as Tommy McGuire
- William Haade as Hefferkamp
- John T. Murray as Marvin
- William Irving as Coleman
- Ernie Adams as Pony Concessioner
- Sidney Blackmer as Political Boss
- Dick Elliott as Slicker
- Harrison Greene as Committeeman
- Donald Haines as Boy in Drug Store
- Si Jenks as Slim
- Fred Kelsey as Bit Role
- Alexander Leftwich as Committeeman
- Wilfred Lucas as Wheeler
- Francis Sayles as Member of Chamber of Commerce
- Syd Saylor as Painter
- John Sheehan as Fire Chief

== Bibliography ==
- Bernard A. Drew. Motion Picture Series and Sequels: A Reference Guide. Routledge, 2013.
