= Everybody's Baby =

- Theatrical release poster
- Directed by: Malcolm St. Clair
- Written by: Robert Chapin; Karen DeWolf; Frances Hyland; Albert Ray; Elizabeth Reinhardt; Hilda Stone
- Produced by: John Stone
- Starring: Jed Prouty; Shirley Deane; Spring Byington
- Cinematography: Edward Snyder
- Edited by: Norman Colbert
- Music by: Samuel Kaylin
- Production company: Twentieth Century Fox
- Distributed by: Twentieth Century Fox
- Release date: March 24, 1939
- Running time: 61 minutes
- Country: United States
- Language: English

Everybody's Baby is a 1939 American comedy film directed by Malcolm St. Clair and starring Jed Prouty, Shirley Deane and Spring Byington. It was part of Twentieth Century Fox's Jones Family series of films. The film's art direction was by Bernard Herzbrun and Boris Leven.

== Plot ==
Dr. Pillcoff (Reginald Denny), who identifies himself as a child psychologist, arrives in the rural township carrying radical views on raising children, namely Behaviorism. His lectures on child rearing include warnings that holding and kissing babies harm their health. Local families are dismayed disturbed by the topic, but Bonnie Thompson (Shirley Deane), who is expecting a child, embraces the theory, causing friction in her family. The fathers in the community look into the matter and suspect that the so-called child expert is a fraud and take steps to expel the disruptive intruder.

== Cast ==
- Jed Prouty as John Jones
- Shirley Deane as Bonnie Thompson
- Spring Byington as Mrs. John Jones
- Russell Gleason as Herbert Thompson
- June Carlson as Lucy Jones
- Florence Roberts as Granny Jones
- Billy Mahan as Bobby Jones
- Reginald Denny as Dr. Pilcoff
- Robert Allen as Dick Lane
- Claire Du Brey as Nurse Cordell
- Marvin Stephens as Tommy McGuire
- Hattie McDaniel as Hattie
- Arthur Loft as Chief Kelly
- Howard C. Hickman as Dr. Jenkins
- George Ernest as Roger Jones
- Kenneth Howell as Jack Jones
- James Blaine as Plainclothes Man
- Stanley Blystone as Plainclothes Man
- Romaine Callender as Salesman
- George Chandler as G. Randolph
- James Flavin as Police Announcer
- Phyllis Fraser as Millie
- Aggie Herring as Mrs. Diggs
- Robert Lowery as B. Wilson
- Mickey Martin as Ratty Diggs
- Sam McDaniel as Master of Ceremonies
- Frank Moran as Tough
- William Newell as Waiter
- Ruth Robinson as Nurse
- Lillian West as Nurse

== Theme ==
The topic of scientifically informed methods of child rearing and psychology were widespread in the United States at the time the Everybody's Baby was produced. Though the matter offers opportunities for humor, the subject matter was serious.

The film character of “Dr. Pillcoff” played by Reginald Denny is based on real-life academic John B. Watson, who espoused the theory of Behaviorism in the 1920s and 30s. The hypothesis asserted that all human behavior could be conditioned, the aim of which to create healthy citizens. His book Psychological Care of Infant and Child (1928) urged parents “never hug or kiss [your infants], never let them sit in your lap.”

According to film historian Ruth Anne Dwyer, director Malcolm St. Clair and associates “effectively debunks the Pillcoff/Watson doctrine” in Everybody’s Baby.

== Bibliography ==
- Bernard A. Drew. Motion Picture Series and Sequels: A Reference Guide. Routledge, 2013.
