= Love on a Budget =

1938 film by Herbert I. Leeds

- Directed by: Herbert I. Leeds
- Written by: Robert Ellis; Helen Logan
- Produced by: Sol M. Wurtzel
- Starring: Jed Prouty; Shirley Deane; Spring Byington
- Cinematography: Edward Snyder
- Edited by: Harry Reynolds
- Music by: Samuel Kaylin
- Production company: Twentieth Century Fox
- Distributed by: Twentieth Century Fox
- Release date: March 4, 1938
- Running time: 60 minutes
- Country: United States
- Language: English

Love on a Budget is a 1938 American comedy film directed by Herbert I. Leeds and starring Jed Prouty, Shirley Deane and Spring Byington. It was part of Twentieth Century Fox's Jones Family series of films.

The film's sets were designed by the art directors Chester Gore and Bernard Herzbrun.

== Plot ==
The Jones' eldest daughter Bonnie and her husband Herbert Thompson have money troubles, which their uncle attempts to help out with.

== Cast ==
- Jed Prouty as John Jones
- Shirley Deane as Bonnie Thompson
- Spring Byington as Mrs. Louise Jones
- Russell Gleason as Herbert Thompson
- Kenneth Howell as Jack Jones
- George Ernest as Roger Jones
- June Carlson as Lucy Jones
- Florence Roberts as Granny Ida Jones
- Billy Mahan as Bobby Jones
- Alan Dinehart as Charles M. Dixon / Uncle Charlie
- Dixie Dunbar as Betty Fisher
- Marvin Stephens as Tommy McGuire
- Paul Harvey as Emory Fisher
- Joyce Compton as Millie Brown
- James Blaine as Townsman
- Raymond Brown as Alf Bigsby
- Heinie Conklin as Small Furniture Mover
- Tom Dempsey as Townsman
- Eddie Dunn as Expressman
- Edward Gargan as Big Furniture Mover
- Johnny Green as Boy
- George Guhl as Jailer
- Arthur Hoyt as Fred - Chief Councilman
- Edward Keane as Bank Manager
- Pat O'Malley as Townsman
- John Sheehan as Fire Chief Nelson
- Edwin Stanley as Committeeman Emmett

== Bibliography ==
- Bernard A. Drew. Motion Picture Series and Sequels: A Reference Guide. Routledge, 2013. ISBN 0-415-72665-4 ISBN 978-0-415-72665-8
