= Borrowing Trouble =

1937 film by Frank R. Strayer

- Theatrical release poster
- Directed by: Frank R. Strayer
- Written by: Robert Chapin; Karen DeWolf
- Produced by: Max Golden
- Starring: Jed Prouty; Shirley Deane; Spring Byington
- Cinematography: Edward Snyder
- Music by: Samuel Kaylin
- Production company: Twentieth Century Fox
- Distributed by: Twentieth Century Fox
- Release date: December 10, 1937
- Running time: 59 minutes
- Country: United States
- Language: English

Borrowing Trouble is a 1937 American comedy film directed by Frank R. Strayer, starring Jed Prouty, Shirley Deane and Spring Byington. (Note: Not to be confused with the 1913 Selig Polyscope Company film of the same name) Borrowing Trouble is part of the Jones Family series of films, and is also known by its alternative title, The Jones Family in Borrowing Trouble.

== Plot ==
The Jones Family's drugstore is robbed, but they believe they know the culprit.

== Cast ==
- Jed Prouty as John Jones
- Shirley Deane as Bonnie Jones
- Spring Byington as Mrs. John Jones
- Russell Gleason as Herbert Thompson
- Kenneth Howell as Jack Jones
- George Ernest as Roger Jones
- June Carlson as Lucy Jones
- Florence Roberts as Granny Jones
- Billy Mahan as Bobby Jones
- Marvin Stephens as Tommy McGuire
- Andrew Tombes as Uncle George
- Howard C. Hickman as Judge Walters
- Cy Kendall as Chief Kelly
- Joe Downing as Charlie
- George Walcott as Lester McGuire
- Dick Wessel as Joe
- Wade Boteler as Sgt. Callahan

== Bibliography ==
- Bernard A. Drew. Motion Picture Series and Sequels: A Reference Guide. Routledge, 2013.
