= Safety in Numbers (1938 film) =

1938 film by Malcolm St. Clair

- Directed by: Malcolm St. Clair
- Written by: Joseph Hoffman; Karen DeWolf; Robert Chapin; Dorothy Mannery; Zena George
- Produced by: John Stone
- Starring: Jed Prouty; Spring Byington; Shirley Deane
- Cinematography: Charles G. Clarke
- Edited by: Harry Reynolds
- Music by: Samuel Kaylin
- Production company: Twentieth Century Fox
- Distributed by: Twentieth Century Fox
- Release date: May 30, 1938
- Running time: 55 minutes
- Country: United States
- Language: English

Safety in Numbers is a 1938 American comedy film directed by Malcolm St. Clair and starring Jed Prouty, Shirley Deane and Spring Byington. It was part of Twentieth Century Fox's Jones Family series.

== Plot ==
Jones family patriarch John Jones is convinced by swindlers that the town swamp contains valuable mineral deposits. The ruse is exposed when some local youth fall into the swamp. The townspeople raise a ruckus and the matter is resolved satisfactorily.

== Cast ==
- Jed Prouty as John Jones
- Shirley Deane as Bonnie Thompson
- Spring Byington as Mrs. John Jones
- Russell Gleason as Herbert Thompson
- Kenneth Howell as Jack Jones
- George Ernest as Roger Jones
- June Carlson as Lucy Jones
- Florence Roberts as Granny Jones
- Billy Mahan as Bobby Jones
- Marvin Stephens as Tommy McGuire
- Iva Stewart as Toni Stewart
- Helen Freeman as Mrs. Stewart
- Henry Kolker as Dr. Lawrence Edmonds
- Paul McVey as Mr. Hensley
- Bruce Warren as Morley
- Edward Earle as Sloane
- Wilfred Lucas as Councilman
- Harrison Greene as Councilman
- Raymond Brown as Councilman Benedict
- Dave Morris as Postman
- Ruth Clifford as Mrs. Hensley
- Robert Lowery as Harry
- Fred Kelsey as Cop
- Floyd Criswell as Motor Cop
- Frank Meredith as Motor Cop
- Hal K. Dawson as Cameraman
- Carroll Nye as Larsen
- Frances Morris as Waitress
- Edwin August as Customer
- Billy Griffith as Mourner / Customer
- Syd Saylor as Guard
- Cy Kendall as Chief of Police

== Reception ==
New York Times film critic Frank S. Nugent notes the formulaic foundation of the Jones Family series and “the obviousness of their scripts.” Mr. Jones (Jed Prouty) is “up to his neck in swindlers” and the family's welfare is put at risk, as in all Jones saga films. Ma Jones (Spring Byington) offers advice on her radio program, and the youngsters, Jack and Lucy (Kenneth Howard and June Carlson, respectively) “puzzle” over matters of elopement and matrimony. Nugent concludes that it would be difficult “to deny the friendliness and likability of their pictures.”

== Bibliography ==
- Bernard A. Drew. Motion Picture Series and Sequels: A Reference Guide. Routledge, 2013.
