= On Their Own =

1940 film by Otto Brower

- Film poster
- Directed by: Otto Brower
- Screenplay by: Harold Buchman; Val Burton
- Story by: Val Burton; Jack Jungmeyer; Edith Skouras
- Produced by: Sol M. Wurtzel
- Starring: Spring Byington; Kenneth Howell; George Ernest; June Carlson; Florence Roberts; Billy Mahan
- Cinematography: Arthur C. Miller
- Edited by: Nick DeMaggio
- Music by: Samuel Kaylin
- Production company: 20th Century-Fox
- Distributed by: 20th Century-Fox
- Release date: May 17, 1940
- Running time: 65 minutes
- Country: United States
- Language: English

On Their Own is a 1940 American comedy film directed by Otto Brower and written by Harold Buchman and Val Burton. This last of 17 Jones Family films stars Spring Byington, Kenneth Howell, George Ernest, June Carlson, Florence Roberts, and Billy Mahan. The film was released on May 17, 1940, by 20th Century-Fox.

== Cast ==
- Spring Byington as Mrs. John Jones
- Kenneth Howell as Jack Jones
- George Ernest as Roger Jones
- June Carlson as Lucy Jones
- Florence Roberts as Granny Jones
- Billy Mahan as Bobby Jones
- Marguerite Chapman as Margaret
- John Qualen as Peters
- Charles Judels as Giuseppe Galentoni
- Chick Chandler as Doc Duggan
- Forrester Harvey as Mr. Pim
- Isabel Randolph as Hortense Dingwell
- Walter Soderling as Mr. Flint
- William B. Davidson as Judge Bull
- Charles Lane as Johnson
