= A Trip to Paris =

1938 film by Malcolm St. Clair

- Directed by: Malcolm St. Clair
- Written by: Katharine Kavanaugh; Robert Ellis; Helen Logan; Richard Flournoy
- Produced by: Max Golden; Max Gordon
- Starring: Jed Prouty; Shirley Deane; Spring Byington
- Cinematography: Edward Snyder
- Edited by: Norman Colbert
- Music by: Samuel Kaylin
- Production company: Twentieth Century Fox
- Distributed by: Twentieth Century Fox
- Release date: May 6, 1938
- Running time: 64 minutes
- Country: United States
- Language: English

A Trip to Paris is a 1938 American comedy film directed by Malcolm St. Clair and starring Jed Prouty, Shirley Deane and Spring Byington. It was part of the Jones Family series of films.

The film's sets were designed by the art directors Haldane Douglas and Bernard Herzbrun.

== Plot ==
The Jones family take a vacation to Paris.

== Cast ==
- Jed Prouty as John Jones
- Shirley Deane as Bonnie Thompson
- Spring Byington as Mrs. John Jones
- Russell Gleason as Herbert Thompson
- Kenneth Howell as Jack Jones
- George Ernest as Roger Jones
- June Carlson as Lucy Jones
- Florence Roberts as Granny Jones
- Billy Mahan as Bobby Jones
- Marvin Stephens as Tommy McGuire
- Joan Valerie as Marguerite Varloff
- Harold Huber as Willie Jones
- Nedda Harrigan as Countess Varloff
- Leonid Kinskey as Emile
- Clay Clement as Duroche

== Bibliography ==
- Bernard A. Drew. Motion Picture Series and Sequels: A Reference Guide. Routledge, 2013.
