= Hot Water (1937 film) =

1937 film by Frank R. Strayer

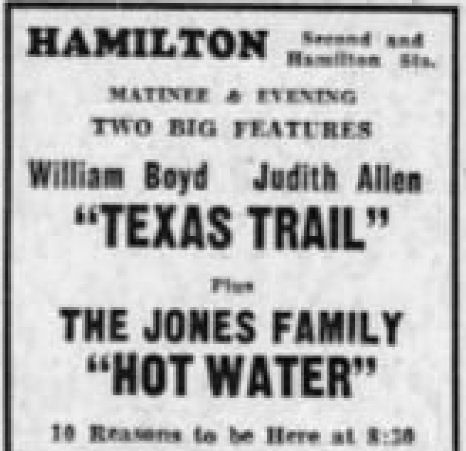
- Newspaper advertisement for the films Texas Trail (1937) and Hot Water (1937)
- Directed by: Frank R. Strayer
- Written by: Ron Ferguson; Eleanor De Lamater; Robert Chapin; Karen DeWolf; Paul Burger
- Produced by: Max Golden
- Starring: Jed Prouty; Shirley Deane; Spring Byington
- Cinematography: Edward Snyder
- Edited by: Nick DeMaggio
- Music by: Samuel Kaylin
- Production company: Twentieth Century Fox
- Distributed by: Twentieth Century Fox
- Release date: September 24, 1937
- Running time: 55 minutes
- Country: United States
- Language: English

Hot Water is a 1937 American comedy film directed by Frank R. Strayer and starring Jed Prouty, Shirley Deane and Spring Byington. It is part of the Jones Family series of films. The Jones father decides to run for mayor, leading the current incumbent to try to disgrace his son.

The film's sets were designed by the art director Chester Gore.

== Partial cast ==
- Jed Prouty as John Jones
- Shirley Deane as Bonnie Jones
- Spring Byington as Mrs. John Jones
- Russell Gleason as Herbert Thompson
- Kenneth Howell as Jack Jones
- George Ernest as Roger Jones
- June Carlson as Lucy Jones
- Florence Roberts as Granny Jones
- Billy Mahan as Bobby Jones
- Joan Marsh as Bebe Montaine
- Marjorie Weaver as Vicki Enfield
- Willard Robertson as Dr. Enfield
- Robert Gleckler as Hal Lynch
- Arthur Hohl as Walter Whittaker
- Selmer Jackson as Maxwell
- Joe King as Mayor Roberts
- Paul Fix as Homer
- Ray Walker as Reporter

== Critical reception ==
Modern Screen’s Leo Townsend noted that this was the latest film in a popular series, and commented, "If you’ve seen one of these family flickers, you’ve seen them all", and he attributed their success to the "true picturizations of the average American home life." He wrote fondly of the returning characters and concluded with the observation, "Plot and production are of relative unimportance in these pictures, compared to the true-to-life characterizations of the cast, which could hardly be improved upon in any case."

Motion Picture Herald wrote, "Having continued through five pictures, the entertainment worth and commercial value of "The Jones Family" series, particularly, as neighborhood and small town theatre attractions, is generally recognized. Clean, wholesome, comic and gayly exciting that manner in which they treat of domestic comedy, drama and romance is intimately familiar."

== Bibliography ==
- Bernard A. Drew. Motion Picture Series and Sequels: A Reference Guide. Routledge, 2013.
