= Back to Nature =

1936 film by James Tinling

- Film poster
- Directed by: James Tinling
- Written by: Robert Ellis; Helen Logan
- Produced by: Max Golden
- Starring: Jed Prouty; Shirley Deane; Dixie Dunbar
- Cinematography: Daniel B. Clark
- Music by: Samuel Kaylin
- Production company: Twentieth Century Fox
- Distributed by: Twentieth Century Fox
- Release date: August 15, 1936
- Running time: 57 minutes
- Country: United States
- Language: English

Back to Nature is a 1936 American comedy film directed by James Tinling and starring Jed Prouty, Shirley Deane and Dixie Dunbar. It is part of the Jones Family series of films.

== Plot ==
The Jones family goes to a convention traveling in a trailer. The oldest daughter gets involved with a convict, the oldest son has a love affair, and the youngest son gets into photography.

== Cast ==
- Jed Prouty as Mr. John Jones
- Shirley Deane as Bonnie Jones
- Dixie Dunbar as Mabel
- Tony Martin as Tom Williams
- Spring Byington as Mrs. Louise Jones
- Kenneth Howell as Jack Jones
- George Ernest as Roger Jones
- June Carlson as Lucy Jones
- Florence Roberts as Granny Jones
- Billy Mahan as Bobby Jones
- Ivan Miller as Federal Officer
- Oscar Apfel as Hotel Manager
- James Barton as Motorcycle Officer
- Spencer Charters as Deputy Sheriff Putney
- Edgar Dearing as Motorcycle Officer
- John Webb Dillon as Scotland Yard Man
- Wesley Giraud as Hitchhiker
- Russell Simpson as Sheriff
- Arthur Stone as Boathouse Owner
- George E. Stone as Mr. Sweeney

== Bibliography ==
- Bernard A. Drew. Motion Picture Series and Sequels: A Reference Guide. Routledge, 2013.
