= The Jones Family in Hollywood =

1939 film by Malcolm St. Clair

- Theatrical release poster
- Directed by: Malcolm St. Clair
- Screenplay by: Harold Tarshis
- Story by: Joseph Hoffman; Buster Keaton
- Produced by: John Stone
- Starring: Jed Prouty; Spring Byington; Kenneth Howell; George Ernest; June Carlson; Florence Roberts
- Cinematography: Edward Snyder
- Edited by: Fred Allen
- Music by: Gene Rose
- Production company: 20th Century Fox
- Distributed by: 20th Century Fox
- Release date: June 2, 1939
- Running time: 60 minutes
- Country: United States
- Language: English

The Jones Family in Hollywood is a 1939 American comedy film directed by Malcolm St. Clair and written by Harold Tarshis. The film stars Jed Prouty, Spring Byington, Kenneth Howell, George Ernest, June Carlson and Florence Roberts. It was released on June 2, 1939, by 20th Century Fox.

The film is one of 17 in the Jones Family B-movie series, the first seven of which were directed by St. Clair.

== Plot ==
Mr. Jones (Jed Prouty) decides to attend an American Legion meeting in Hollywood, and takes his whole family along. His teenage daughter Lucy (June Carlson) is thrilled by the romantic attentions of a would-be movie star and cad, Danny Regan (William Tracy), who gets her a screen test. The test is a disaster, and the Jones family wanders through the studio, upsetting actors, directors and technicians. A happy ending is provided.

== Cast ==
- Jed Prouty as John Jones
- Spring Byington as Mrs. John Jones
- Kenneth Howell as Jack Jones
- George Ernest as Roger Jones
- June Carlson as Lucy Jones
- Florence Roberts as Granny Jones
- Billy Mahan as Bobby Jones
- William Tracy as Danny Regan
- June Gale as Alice Morley
- Marvin Stephens as Tommy McGuire
- Hamilton MacFadden as Director Townsend
- Matt McHugh as Charlie
- Lillian Yarbo as Maid (uncredited)
- Phyllis Barry as Actress (uncredited)
- George Chandler as Hotel Clerk (uncredited)
