= George Ernest =

American actor (1921–2009)

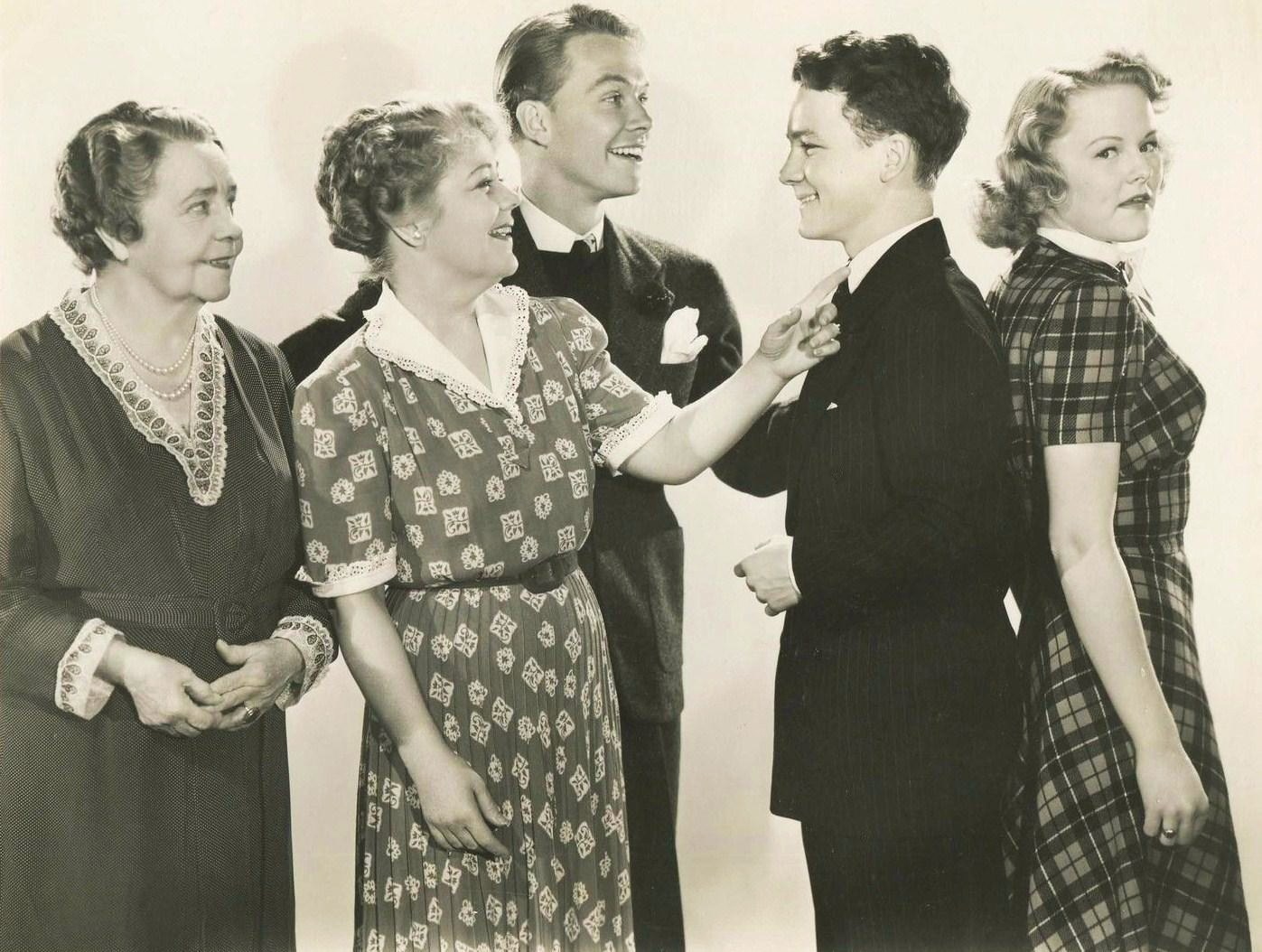
- George Ernest (fourth from left) as Roger Jones in the Jones Family film On Their Own (1940)
- Born: George Ruud Hjorth; November 20, 1921; Pittsfield, Massachusetts, U.S.
- Died: June 25, 2009 (aged 87); Whittier, California, U.S.
- Occupation: Actor
- Years active: 1930–1942

George Ernest (born George Ruud Hjorth; November 20, 1921 – June 25, 2009) was an American actor and Office of Strategic Services (OSS) combat photographer/cameraman during World War II. He appeared in more than 60 films between 1930 and 1942.

== Early life ==
Ernest was born George Ruud Hjorth on November 20, 1921, in Pittsfield, Massachusetts, to a Norwegian mother and Danish father. The family moved to California when he was two and a half years old. His father owned a restaurant in Hollywood.

== Acting career ==
Ernest began getting small parts in silent films when he was just three years old. He had a successful career as a child actor, being a member of Our Gang in 1931. He also played Roger Jones in 17 Jones Family low-budget films from 1936 to 1940 (named Roger Evers in the first movie, Every Saturday Night). However, as he grew older, roles became scarcer, so he learned from cameramen on his films and became one himself.

== World War II ==
When the Japanese attacked Pearl Harbor on December 7, 1941, and the United States officially entered World War II, he enlisted. At a friend's suggestion, he became a combat photographer and "one of the 17 original movie makers" of a special OSS photographic unit headed by noted film director John Ford. He had to sign an agreement not to discuss his wartime work for 50 years.

On his first combat mission, he photographed the fighting in North Africa, followed by the invasion of Sicily and then on to the Italian mainland. He parachuted "into France and Germany ... to take pictures of bridges, roads, rivers, railroads and even a V-1 launch site".

In later life, Ernest claimed that in early June 1944, he parachuted into occupied France with three film cameras without being told what he was supposed to do. The French Resistance hid him for a couple of days, then took him to the coast before dawn of June 6. He was told he would know what to film. As dawn came up, he witnessed, and filmed, the D-Day invasion of Omaha Beach by the United States Army - the only known Allied footage from the German perspective. After using up all of his film, he managed to get through the American lines unharmed and returned to England. Absurdly, when the film was to be screened, he was ordered out of the room because he did not have the top secret clearance required to see it. Records at the National Archives, in the form of a letter over his name, indicate he was stationed aboard the destroyer USS Hobson and spent the invasion filming operations at sea.

Hjorth also shot pictures of Buchenwald concentration camp and the aftermath of an Axis atrocity in France (the corpses of dozens of civilians burned alive).

== Post-war ==
He became an executive for McDonnell Douglas. When OSS files were declassified, his wartime activities came to light. Historians are searching for the film he shot, so far without success.

He died on June 25, 2009, in Whittier, California.

He was one of the subjects of Shooting War, a 2000 documentary about World War II combat cameramen, and episode 9 of the TV series Brad Meltzer's Lost History.

== Partial filmography ==
- Sunny Side Up (1929) - Little Boy (uncredited)
- Along Came Youth (1930) - Neetsfoot Boy
- Men on Call (1930) - Little Boy (uncredited)
- Fly My Kite (1931, Short) - Georgie
- The Star Witness (1931) - Donny Leeds
- Shiver My Timbers (1931, Our Gang short) - Georgie
- The Deadline (1931) - Jimmy
- Union Depot (1932) - Eight-Year-Old Boy (uncredited)
- Fireman, Save My Child (1932) - Team Mascot (uncredited)
- Destry Rides Again (1932) - Willie
- Love Is a Racket (1932) - Newsboy (uncredited)
- The Fourth Horseman (1932) - Boy with Firecrackers (uncredited)
- Speed Demon (1932) - Catfish Jones
- Handle with Care (1932) - Charlie
- The Chief (1937) - Boy at Circus (uncredited)
- Girl Without a Room (1933) - Child (uncredited)
- Beloved (1934) - Eric, as a Boy
- The Human Side (1934) - Tom Sheldon
- Music in the Air (1934) - Boy (uncredited)
- Little Men (1934) - Emil
- Diamond Jim (1935) - Sullivan (the Boy) (uncredited)
- Dinky (1935) - Jojo
- Racing Luck (1935) - Jimmy Curtis
- Straight from the Heart (1935) - Neighbor Boy (uncredited)
- The Glass Key (1935) - Boy (uncredited)
- The Mystery of Edwin Drood (1935) - Deputy
- The Perfect Tribute (1935) - Boy, wounded soldier's kid brother (uncredited)
- Man Hunt (1936) - Jackie
- The Trail of the Lonesome Pine (1936) - Dave at age 10 (uncredited)
- Song of the Saddle (1936) - Little Frankie
- Every Saturday Night (1936) - Roger Evers
- Too Many Parents (1936) - Phillip Stewart
- Educating Father (1936) - Roger Jones
- Back to Nature (1936) - Roger Jones
- The Plainsman (1936) - A Boy
- Reunion (1936) - Rusty
- Off to the Races (1937) - Roger Jones
- Let's Get Married (1937) - Billy Norris (uncredited)
- Motor Madness (1937) - 'Pancho', Runaway Kid
- The Jones Family in Big Business (1937) - Roger Jones
- Wife, Doctor and Nurse (1937) - Red
- Hot Water (1937) - Roger Jones
- Borrowing Trouble (1937) - Roger Jones
- Lady Behave! (1937) - Hank Cormack
- Paradise for Three (1938) - Office Boy (uncredited)
- Love on a Budget (1938) - Roger Jones
- A Trip to Paris (1938) - Roger Jones
- Safety in Numbers (1938) - Roger Jones
- Down on the Farm (1938) - Roger Jones
- Sweethearts (1938) - Bobby - First Call Boy (uncredited)
- Everybody's Baby (1939) - Roger Jones
- Boy Friend (1939) - Billy Bradley
- The Jones Family in Hollywood (1939) - Roger Jones
- Quick Millions (1939) - Roger Jones
- 20,000 Men a Year (1939) - Skip Rogers
- Too Busy to Work (1939) - Roger Jones
- Young as You Feel (1940) - Roger Jones
- On Their Own (1940) - Roger Jones
- Four Sons (1940) - Fritz
- Golden Gloves (1940) - Joey Parker
- Meet the Missus (1940) - Sidney Higgins
- Petticoat Politics (1941) - Sidney Higgins
- Mountain Moonlight (1941) - Johnny Weaver
- Remember the Day (1941) - Bill Tower
- Stardust on the Sage (1942) - Curly

== Bibliography ==
- Goldrup, Tom and Jim (2002). Growing Up on the Set: Interviews with 39 Former Child Actors of Film and Television. McFarland & Co. pp. 67–75. ISBN 1476613702.
- Holmstrom, John (1996). The Moving Picture Boy: An International Encyclopaedia from 1895 to 1995. Norwich: Michael Russell, p. 108-109.
