= Off to the Races (film) =

1937 film by Frank R. Strayer

- Directed by: Frank R. Strayer
- Screenplay by: Robert Ellis; Helen Logan
- Produced by: Max Golden
- Starring: Slim Summerville; Jed Prouty; Shirley Deane; Spring Byington; Russell Gleason; Kenneth Howell
- Cinematography: Barney McGill
- Edited by: Alex Troffey
- Production company: 20th Century Fox
- Distributed by: 20th Century Fox
- Release date: February 5, 1937
- Running time: 58 minutes
- Country: United States
- Language: English

Off to the Races is a 1937 American comedy film directed by Frank R. Strayer and written by Robert Ellis and Helen Logan. The film stars Slim Summerville, Jed Prouty, Shirley Deane, Spring Byington, Russell Gleason and Kenneth Howell. The film was released on February 5, 1937, by 20th Century Fox.

== Plot ==
Uncle George and daughter Winnie Mae turn up just as the Jones family is preparing for the county fair. The irresponsible George is going to enter his horse, Jimmy B, in the big harness race at the fair and encourages everybody to bet money on him to win.

John Jones doesn't care for horses or his wife Louise's uncle much. Their daughter Bonnie is bringing boyfriend Herbert Thompson to the fair. Herbert needs money to get married and bets every cent he has on Jimmy B, but on race day, Uncle George is hauled off to jail for failure to pay his ex-wife's alimony. John Jones reluctantly agrees to ride the horse, just to get Uncle George out of jail and out of his hair. With a little luck, the race is won.

== Cast ==
- Slim Summerville as Uncle George
- Jed Prouty as John Jones
- Shirley Deane as Bonnie Jones
- Spring Byington as Louise Jones
- Russell Gleason as Herbert Thompson
- Kenneth Howell as Jack Jones
- George Ernest as Roger Jones
- June Carlson as Lucy Jones
- Florence Roberts as Granny Jones
- Billy Mahan as Bobby Jones
- Ann Gillis as Winnie Mae
- Fred Toones as Ebbie
- Chick Chandler as Spike
- Ruth Gillette as Rosabelle

== See also ==
- List of films about horses
- List of films about horse racing
