= Young as You Feel =

Young as You Feel may refer to:

- Young as You Feel (1931 film), an American comedy starring Will Rogers
- Young as You Feel (1940 film), an American comedy, part of the Jones Family series of films

== See also ==
- As Young as You Feel, a 1951 film
