= Educating Father =

1936 film by James Tinling

- Directed by: James Tinling
- Written by: Katharine Kavanaugh; Edward T. Lowe Jr.; John Patrick
- Produced by: Max Golden
- Starring: Jed Prouty; Shirley Deane; Dixie Dunbar
- Cinematography: Daniel B. Clark
- Edited by: Louis R. Loeffler
- Music by: Samuel Kaylin
- Production company: Twentieth Century Fox
- Distributed by: Twentieth Century Fox
- Release date: May 23, 1936
- Running time: 59 minutes
- Country: United States
- Language: English

Educating Father is a 1936 American comedy film directed by James Tinling and starring Jed Prouty, Shirley Deane, and Dixie Dunbar. It was part of the Jones Family series of films.

== Cast ==
- Jed Prouty as John Jones
- Shirley Deane as Bonnie Jones
- Dixie Dunbar as Millicent
- Spring Byington as Mrs. John Jones
- Kenneth Howell as Jack Jones
- June Carlson as Lucy Jones
- George Ernest as Roger Jones
- Florence Roberts as Granny Jones
- Billy Mahan as Bobby Jones
- Francis Ford as Sheriff Hart
- Charles Tannen as Jim Courtney
- J. Anthony Hughes as Dick Harris
- David Newell as Eddie Gordon
- Clarence Wilson as Jess Boynton
- Jonathan Hale as Fred Humphrey
- Erville Alderson as Dr. Willoughby
- Dick Elliott as Townley
- Phyllis Fraser as Girl in Drugstore
- Selmer Jackson as Prof. Howard
- Landers Stevens as Milford

== Bibliography ==
- Bernard A. Drew. Motion Picture Series and Sequels: A Reference Guide. Routledge, 2013.
