= Every Saturday Night =

1936 film by James Tinling

- Theatrical release poster
- Directed by: James Tinling
- Written by: Edward Eliscu; Katharine Kavanaugh
- Produced by: Max Golden
- Starring: June Lang; Thomas Beck; Jed Prouty
- Cinematography: Joseph H. August
- Edited by: Fred Allen
- Music by: Score: Samuel Kaylin; Songs: Burton Lane (music); Troy Sanders (music); Herb Magidson (lyrics); Sidney Clare (lyrics)
- Production company: Twentieth Century Fox
- Distributed by: Twentieth Century Fox
- Release date: March 13, 1936
- Running time: 58 minutes
- Country: United States
- Language: English

Every Saturday Night is a 1936 American comedy film directed by James Tinling and starring June Lang, Thomas Beck and Jed Prouty. This is the first of 17 low-budget films about the Jones Family (named Evers initially).

== Cast ==
- June Lang as Bonnie Evers
- Thomas Beck as Clark Newall
- Jed Prouty as Mr. Evers
- Spring Byington as Mrs. Evers
- Florence Roberts as Granny Evers
- Kenneth Howell as Jack Evers
- George Ernest as Roger Evers
- June Carlson as Lucy Evers
- Paul Stanton as Mr. Mewell
- Billy Mahan as Bobby Evers
- Kay Hughes as Patty Newall
- Phyllis Fraser as Millicent
- Fred Wallace as Jed
- Oscar Apfel as Mr. Dayton

== Critical reception ==
Lionel Collier, writing for the British magazine Picturegoer, commented "All the family will enjoy this homely story of a typical middle-class household in which the various members are vividly characterised." Discussing the acting, he wrote, "Jed Prouty gives a great performance as Evers and there is a wealth of understanding in Florence Roberts’ portrayal of Grandma."

== Bibliography ==
- Bernard A. Drew. Motion Picture Series and Sequels: A Reference Guide. Routledge, 2013.
