= The Jones Family in Big Business =

1937 film by Frank R. Strayer

Big Business
- Directed by: Frank R. Strayer
- Written by: Eleanor De Lamater; Robert Ellis; Ron Ferguson; Helen Logan
- Produced by: Max Golden
- Starring: Jed Prouty; Shirley Deane; Spring Byington
- Cinematography: Edward Snyder
- Edited by: Alfred DeGaetano
- Music by: Samuel Kaylin
- Production company: Twentieth Century Fox
- Distributed by: Twentieth Century Fox
- Release date: June 18, 1937
- Running time: 60 minutes
- Country: United States
- Language: English

Big Business is a 1937 American comedy film directed by Frank R. Strayer and starring Jed Prouty, Shirley Deane and Spring Byington. It was part of Twentieth Century Fox's Jones Family series of films. The film's art direction was by Chester Gore.

The Jones Family invest in an oil well.

== Cast ==
- Jed Prouty as John Jones
- Shirley Deane as Bonnie Jones
- Spring Byington as Mrs. John Jones
- Russell Gleason as Herbert Thompson
- Kenneth Howell as Jack Jones
- Allan Lane as Ted Hewett
- George Ernest as Roger Jones
- June Carlson as Lucy Jones
- Florence Roberts as Granny Jones
- Billy Mahan as Bobby Jones
- Marjorie Weaver as Vicky
- Frank Conroy as Leland Whitney
- Wallis Clark as Mr. Rodney
- Irving Bacon as Mr. Kinney - Man with Toothache
- Maurice Cass as Judge
- Lester Dorr as Townsman Investor
- Sarah Edwards as Miss Collins - School Principal
- Sydney Jarvis as Townsman Investor
- Fred Kelsey as Oil Man at Well
- Charles Lane as Webster - Bank Representative
- Pat West as Oil Man at Well
- Charles Williams as Florist Shop Customer

== Bibliography ==
- Bernard A. Drew. Motion Picture Series and Sequels: A Reference Guide. Routledge, 2013.
