= Boy Friend (1939 film) =

1939 film by James Tinling

- Directed by: James Tinling
- Screenplay by: Joseph Hoffman; Barry Trivers
- Story by: Lester Ziffren; Louis Moore
- Produced by: John Stone
- Starring: Jane Withers; Arleen Whelan; Richard Bond; Douglas Fowley; Warren Hymer; George Ernest; Robert Kellard; Minor Watson
- Cinematography: Lucien Andriot, A.S.C.
- Edited by: Norman Colbert
- Music by: Samuel Kaylin (musical direction)
- Production company: 20th Century Fox
- Distributed by: 20th Century Fox
- Release date: May 19, 1939
- Running time: 70 minutes
- Country: United States
- Language: English

Boy Friend is a 1939 American comedy film second feature directed by James Tinling and written by Joseph Hoffman and Barry Trivers. The film stars Jane Withers, Arleen Whelan and George Ernest. The film was released on May 19, 1939, by 20th Century Fox.

== Cast ==
- Jane Withers as Sally Murphy
- Arleen Whelan as Sue Duffy
- George Ernest as Billy Bradley
- Richard Bond as Jimmy Murphy
- Douglas Fowley as Ed Boyd
- Warren Hymer as Greenberg
- Robert Kellard as Tommy Bradley
- Minor Watson as Capt. Duffy
- Robert Shaw as Cracker
- Ted Pearson as Callahan
- William H. Conselman Jr. as Arizona
- Myra Marsh as Mrs. Murphy
- Harold Goodwin as Matchie Riggs
- Lillian Yarbo as Delphinie (uncredited)
