= Heaven with a Barbed Wire Fence =

1939 film by Ricardo Cortez

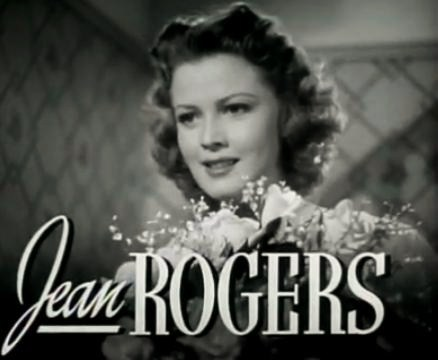
- Jean Rogers from trailer
- Directed by: Ricardo Cortez
- Written by: Dalton Trumbo; Leonard Hoffman; Ben Grauman Kohn
- Produced by: Sol M. Wurtzel (Exec prod)
- Starring: Jean Rogers; Raymond Walburn; Marjorie Rambeau; Glenn Ford
- Cinematography: Edward Cronjager
- Edited by: Norman Colbert
- Music by: Samuel Kaylin
- Distributed by: 20th Century Fox
- Release date: November 3, 1939
- Running time: 62 minutes
- Country: United States
- Language: English

Heaven with a Barbed Wire Fence is a 1939 drama film written by Dalton Trumbo, directed by Ricardo Cortez, and starring Jean Rogers, Raymond Walburn, Marjorie Rambeau and Glenn Ford. This was the first major screen role for both Ford and Richard Conte, and Ford was billed fourth.

== Plot ==
Joe Riley has worked six long years in New York City to save enough money to buy 20 acres in Arizona. With no money left, he has to travel to his new home by hitchhiking and sneaking aboard freight trains and trucks. Riley ends up meeting and travelling with illegal immigrant Anita Santos, vagabond Tony Casseli and Tony's educated friend "the Professor".

During their travels, Tony is shot in the leg with buckshot, so the trio have to leave him behind at the hospital. At a bar, they encounter Mamie, an old flame of the Professor's and the establishment's owner. While there, Sheriff Clem Diggers takes Anita into custody for the immigration authorities. When Joe tries to intervene, he blurts out enough to get himself in trouble, charged first for aiding and abetting, then for traveling with her across the country, and finally for Anita being underage (19). The Professor comes to the rescue: if they get married, all the legal trouble will go away. Staring at 15 years in prison, Joe has no choice but to go along. Stung by his reluctance, Anita slips away after the ceremony.

The Professor decides to settle down with Mamie, so Joe arrives at his property alone. He is shocked to discover that the land is nothing like what the advertisement showed. Then Anita shows up with a truckload of household goods. At first, Joe is hostile, but Anita tells him the land is good for growing oranges, grapes and olives. She knows because she grew up in a village where they did just that. Soon, she has infected him with her dreams for the place, and Joe admits he loves her.

== Cast ==
- Jean Rogers as Anita
- Raymond Walburn as The Professor
- Marjorie Rambeau as Mamie
- Glenn Ford as Joe
- Richard Conte (billed as "Nicholas Conte") as Tony
- Eddie Collins as Bill
- Ward Bond as Hunk
- Irving Bacon as Sheriff
- Kay Linaker as Nurse

== Reception ==
The Variety magazine review described it as "No hit story, it does manage to maintain a fair shake of audience interest." The reviewer complimented Walburn's performance in particular, as well as Rambeau's and Rogers'. However, "Ford doesn't have any particular luster, but Conte shows okay."
