= Quick Millions =

Quick Millions may refer to:

- Quick Millions (1931 film), a 1931 Pre-Code crime film directed by Rowland Brown and starring Spencer Tracy
- Quick Millions (1939 film), a 1939 American comedy film
