= Jed Prouty =

American actor (1879–1956)

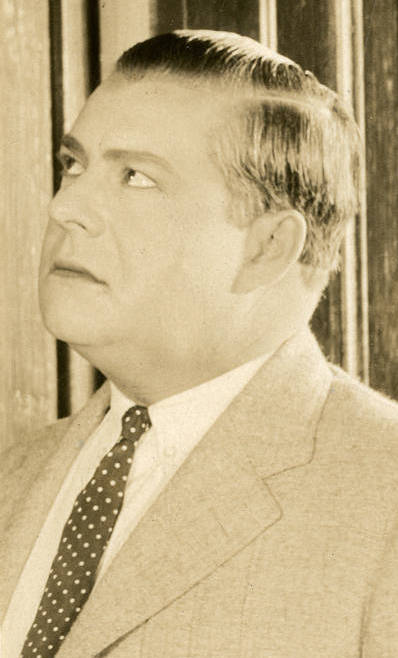
- Prouty in 1923
- Born: Clarence Gordon Prouty; April 6, 1879; Boston, Massachusetts, U.S.
- Died: May 10, 1956 (aged 77); New York City, U.S.
- Occupation: Actor
- Years active: 1910–1952 (including stage years before movies)
- Spouse: Marion Murray (?-1951; her death)

Jed Prouty (born Clarence Gordon Prouty; April 6, 1879 – May 10, 1956) was an American film actor. Today's audiences may recognize him as the stammering vaudeville booker in The Broadway Melody (1929), the theater manager in Laurel and Hardy's Hollywood Party (1934), the oily publicist in A Star is Born (1937), the chief of the Keystone Cops in Hollywood Cavalcade (1939), and the network-radio executive in James Stewart's Pot o' Gold (1941).

== Biography ==
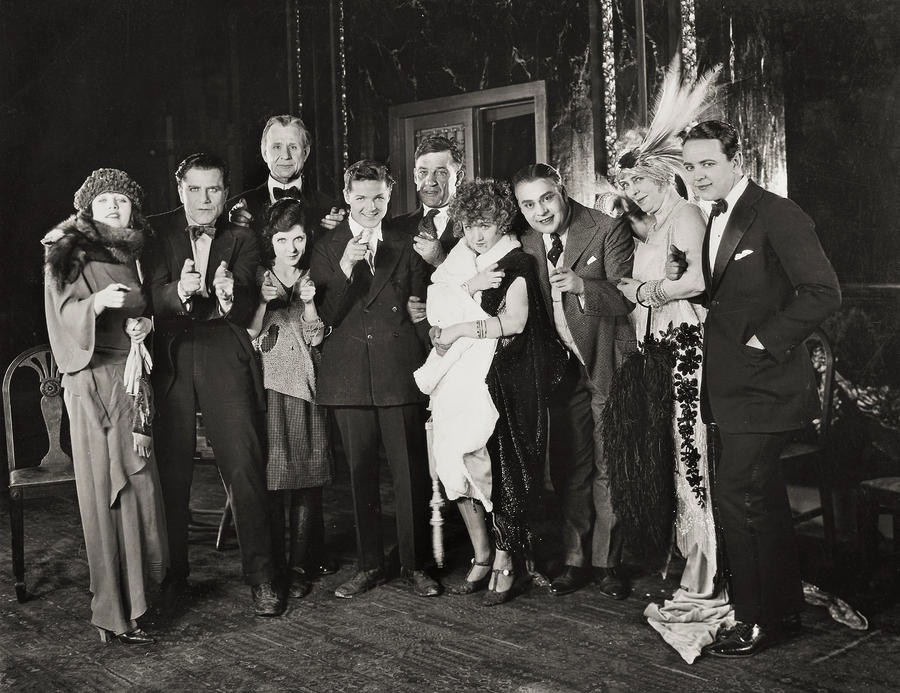
Prouty (third, right) with other cast of Kick In (1922)

Born as Clarence Gordon Prouty in Boston, Massachusetts, Prouty was a vaudeville performer before becoming a film actor. Mostly appearing in comedies, he occasionally performed a serious character role, as in A Star is Born (1937).

After a significant career in silent films, notably in the Colleen Moore features Ella Cinders (1926) and Orchids and Ermine (1927), Jed Prouty established himself in the new field of talking pictures with a comic role in the wildly successful early musical The Broadway Melody (1929). His performance in the independent production Bachelor of Arts (1934), released by Fox, landed him a contract with Fox, where he appeared with Will Rogers in Life Begins at 40 (1934). While at Fox played the lead in the domestic comedy Every Saturday Night (1936); with the studio pursuing a wide-ranging program of film series, Prouty became the principal character in the Jones Family film series. Seventeen low-budget family comedies were produced between 1936 and 1940, along with Spring Byington as Mrs. Jones, for such directors as Malcolm St. Clair and Frank R. Strayer.

Jed Prouty's appearance in Fox's Technicolor tribute to silent comedies, Hollywood Cavalcade (1939) earned him good notices, and on the strength of these he tried to renegotiate his contract. This cost him his berth at Fox, as Ivan Spear of Boxoffice reported: "20th Century-Fox's newest chapter [of the Jones Family] is marked by the absence, for the first time, of "Pa"—Jed Prouty. His recent contractual difficulties with the studio made it necessary for writers to eliminate the head of the family from the script, which they did through the expedient of a nervous breakdown." The film, On Their Own (1940), concluded the series.

Prouty also starred in a couple of short-subject comedies for RKO Radio Pictures in 1938 and 1939. He continued to play character roles in pictures through 1950, and on television through 1952.

== Partial filmography ==
(Films marked with a caret are Jones Family films)

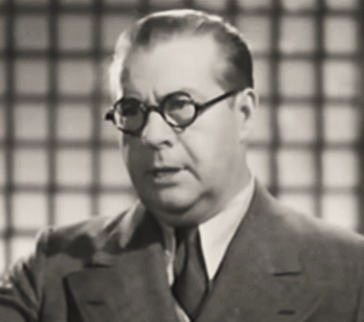
Prouty in Danger on the Air (1938)

- Her Game (1919)
- Sadie Love (1919)
- The Conquest of Canaan (1921)
- The Great Adventure (1921)
- Experience (1921)
- Room and Board (1921)
- Kick In (1922)
- The Girl of the Golden West (1923)
- The Knockout (1925)
- The Coast of Folly (1925)
- The Unguarded Hour (1925)
- Her Second Chance (1926)
- Ella Cinders (1926)
- Bred in Old Kentucky (1926)
- Miss Nobody (1926)
- Don Juan's Three Nights (1926)
- The Mystery Club (1926)
- Unknown Treasures (1926)
- Orchids and Ermine (1927)
- Domestic Meddlers (1928)
- Name the Woman (1928)
- Sonny Boy (1929)
- The Broadway Melody (1929)
- His Captive Woman (1929)
- Two Weeks Off (1929)
- The Fall of Eve (1929)
- The Devil's Holiday (1930)
- Paid (1930)
- Strangers May Kiss (1931)
- Annabelle's Affairs (1931)
- The Secret Call (1931)
- The Age for Love (1931)
- Business and Pleasure (1932)
- Manhattan Tower (1932)
- Skyway (1933)
- The Big Bluff (1933)
- Music in the Air (1934)
- Murder on the Blackboard (1934)
- Every Saturday Night (1936) ^
- Educating Father (1936) ^
- Back to Nature (1936) ^
- The Texas Rangers (1936)
- Can This Be Dixie? (1936)
- Small Town Boy (1937)
- Off to the Races (1937) ^
- The Jones Family in Big Business (1937) ^
- One Hundred Men and a Girl (1937)
- Hot Water (1937) ^
- Borrowing Trouble (1937) ^
- Love on a Budget (1938) ^
- A Trip to Paris (1938) ^
- Safety in Number (1938) ^
- Danger on the Air (1938)
- Down on the Farm (1938) ^
- Goodbye Broadway (1938)
- The Duke of West Point (1938)
- Hollywood Cavalcade (1939)
- Exile Express (1939)
- Everybody's Baby (1939) ^
- The Jones Family in Hollywood (1939) ^
- Quick Millions (1939) ^
- Too Busy to Work (1939) ^
- Young as You Feel (1940) ^
- Remedy for Riches (1940)
- Pot o' Gold (1941)
- Father Steps Out (1941)
- Roar of the Press (1941)
- The Affairs of Jimmy Valentine (1942)
- Obliging Young Lady (1942)
- Guilty Bystander (1950)
