= The First Baby =

1936 film by Lewis Seiler

- Directed by: Lewis Seiler
- Screenplay by: Lamar Trotti
- Produced by: John Stone
- Starring: Johnny Downs; Shirley Deane; Jane Darwell; Dixie Dunbar; Marjorie Gateson; Gene Lockhart
- Cinematography: Barney McGill
- Edited by: Alfred DeGaetano
- Music by: Samuel Kaylin
- Production company: 20th Century Fox
- Distributed by: 20th Century Fox
- Release date: April 2, 1936
- Running time: 75 minutes
- Country: United States
- Language: English

The First Baby is a 1936 American comedy film directed by Lewis Seiler and written by Lamar Trotti. The film stars Johnny Downs, Shirley Deane, Jane Darwell, Dixie Dunbar, Marjorie Gateson and Gene Lockhart. The film was released on April 2, 1936, by 20th Century Fox.

== Cast ==
- Johnny Downs as Johnny Ellis
- Shirley Deane as Trudy Wells
- Jane Darwell as Mrs. Ellis
- Dixie Dunbar as Maude Holbrook
- Marjorie Gateson as Mrs. Wells
- Gene Lockhart as Mr. Ellis
- Taylor Holmes as Mr. Wells
- Willard Robertson as Dr. Clarke
- Hattie McDaniel as Dora
