= Young as You Feel (1940 film) =

- Theatrical release poster
- Directed by: Malcolm St. Clair
- Written by: Lewis Beach (play); Joseph Hoffman; Stanley Rauh
- Produced by: John Stone; Sol M. Wurtzel
- Starring: Jed Prouty; Spring Byington; Joan Valerie
- Cinematography: Charles G. Clarke
- Edited by: Harry Reynolds
- Music by: Samuel Kaylin
- Production company: Twentieth Century Fox
- Distributed by: Twentieth Century Fox
- Release date: February 16, 1940
- Running time: 60 minutes
- Country: United States
- Language: English

Young as You Feel is a 1940 American comedy film directed by Malcolm St. Clair and starring Jed Prouty, Spring Byington and Joan Valerie. It was part of Twentieth Century Fox's Jones Family series of films. The film's plot was similar to that of the 1931 film Young as You Feel.

Young as You Feel is the last of the Jones Family films.

== Plot ==
The Jones family patriarch sells the family drug store and moves his family to the city. The Jones family, desirous of an urbane lifestyle, is fooled out of their money by confidence men and moves back to their home town.

== Cast ==
- Jed Prouty as John Jones
- Spring Byington as Mrs. John Jones
- Joan Valerie as Bonnie Jones
- Russell Gleason as Herbert Thompson
- Kenneth Howell as Jack Jones
- George Ernest as Roger Jones
- June Carlson as Lucy Jones
- Florence Roberts as Granny Jones
- Billy Mahan as Bobby Jones
- Helen Ericson as Sandra
- George Givot as Boris Mousilvitch
- Marvin Stephens as Tommy McGuire
- Harlan Briggs as Dr. Kinsley
- Harry Shannon as Gillespie
- Jack Carson as Norcross
- Guy Rapp as Baron Gonzales de Cordoba
- Gladys Blake as Mrs. Blake
- Esther Brodelet as Polly Marshall
- John Elliott as Ambulance doctor
- Veronica Lake in a bit part
- Billy Lechner as Boy
- Joan Leslie as Girl
- John Sheehan as Fire Chief
- Lee Shumway as Policeman
- Bruce Warren as Norcross representative
- Irma Wilson as Brenda Walters

== Bibliography ==
- Bernard A. Drew. Motion Picture Series and Sequels: A Reference Guide. Routledge, 2013.
