= Florence Roberts =

American actress (1860s–1940)

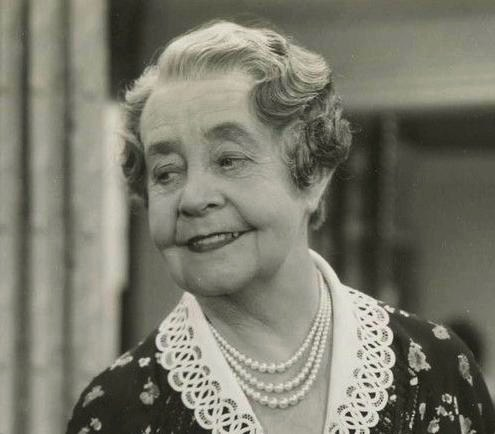
- Florence Roberts circa 1938
- Born: March 16, 1864 (Some sources state 1861); New York City
- Died: June 6, 1940; Hollywood, California, U.S.
- Years active: 1917–1940
- Spouse: Walter Gale
- Children: 1

Florence Roberts (March 16, 1861/1864 – June 6, 1940 was an American actress of the stage and in motion pictures.

== Stock company actress ==
Born in New York City, she began acting onstage there. Her career began at the Brooklyn Opera House in Hoop of Gold. She secured her first stage role with the Denman Thompson Company and played leads with the N.B. Curtis Company. This experience led to appearances on Broadway. She once starred in Zala, a production of David Belasco. She headed a stock company in Philadelphia, for a period of 15 years. The actress made three world tours in stock. There was a South African repertoire and a tour of Australia with the Henry Duffy players. She also played in stock companies in Boston and other cities.

In the early 1900s, she made annual tours under the direction of Frederick Belasco.

== Film career ==
Roberts' success in motion pictures began with a Mack Sennett comedy. The film producer saw her on the stage in Your Uncle Dudley and cast her in Grandma's Girl (1930). Her earliest roles were in A Wife's Suspicion and A Wise Dummy, both in 1917. Among her film performances, the Jones Family series is the most renowned. She played the role of Grandma.

== Personal life ==
Roberts married actor Walter Gale, and they had a son, Robert Gale.

== Death ==
Roberts died from cardiovascular disease at her home in Hollywood. She was buried in Forest Lawn Memorial Park, with funeral services performed at Wee Kirk of the Heather.

Her eulogy was read by her adopted son, Edward Everett Horton, with whom she appeared in stock. The actress' death came unexpectedly three weeks after she had returned from a vacation trip to Panama. She went there following completion of 20th Century Fox's Jones Family series for the 1939–1940 season.

== Partial filmography ==
- Allan Quatermain (1919) - Mrs. McKenzie
- The Man Who Was Afraid (1920) - Mrs. Robinson
- The Sleepwalker (1922) - Mrs. Fabian Dumond
- The Vulture's Prey (1922) - Landlady
- The Best People (1925) - (uncredited)
- The Eyes of the World (1930) - The Maid (prologue)
- Soup to Nuts (1930) - Junior's Mother (uncredited)
- Kept Husbands (1931) - Mrs. Henrietta Parker
- Bachelor Apartment (1931) - Mrs. Halloran (uncredited)
- Everything's Rosie (1931) - Mrs. Lowe
- Too Many Cooks (1931) - Mother Cook
- Fanny Foley Herself (1931) - Lucy
- Her Majesty, Love (1931) - Grandma (uncredited)
- Westward Passage (1932) - Mrs. Ottendorf
- What Price Hollywood? (1932) - Elderly Brown Derby Diner (uncredited)
- Make Me a Star (1932) - Mrs. Gashwiler
- The All American (1932) - Mrs. King
- Vanity Street (1932) - Annie - Fern's Maid (uncredited)
- Officer Thirteen (1932) - Granny
- Employees' Entrance (1933) - Shoe Customer (uncredited)
- Dangerously Yours (1933) - Mrs. Lathem
- Fast Workers (1933) - Short Window Shopper (uncredited)
- Daring Daughters (1933) - Ginger Hemingway - the Grandmother
- A Bedtime Story (1933) - Flower Shop Customer (uncredited)
- Lilly Turner (1933) - Wedding Guest Calling for Bride (uncredited)
- Melody Cruise (1933) - Miss Potts
- The Song of Songs (1933) - Book Store Customer (uncredited)
- Torch Singer (1933) - Mother Angelica
- Ever in My Heart (1933) - Eunice (uncredited)
- Blood Money (1933) - Judge's Wife (uncredited)
- Hoop-La (1933) - Ma Benson
- The Meanest Gal in Town (1934) - Mom - Old Stranded Actress (uncredited)
- Miss Fane's Baby Is Stolen (1934) - Agnes
- Success at Any Price (1934) - Cleaning Woman (uncredited)
- Student Tour (1934) - Elderly Woman (uncredited)
- Cleopatra (1934) - Lady Flora
- Babes in Toyland (1934) - Widow Peep
- Sons of Steel (1934) - Sarah Mason
- Rocky Mountain Mystery (1935) - Mrs. Ballard
- Public Opinion (1935) - Mrs. Buttons
- The Nut Farm (1935) - Ma Barton - Willie's Mother
- Les Misérables (1935) - Toussaint
- Every Night at Eight (1935) - Mrs. Murgatroyd (uncredited)
- Accent on Youth (1935) - Mrs. Benham (uncredited)
- Harmony Lane (1935) - Mrs. Foster
- Your Uncle Dudley (1935) - Janet Dixon
- The Country Doctor (1936) - Grandmother (uncredited)
- Every Saturday Night (1936) - Granny Evers
- Nobody's Fool (1936) - Mary Jones
- Back to Nature (1936) - Granny Jones
- Off to the Races (1937) - Granny Jones
- Nobody's Baby (1937) - Mrs. Mason - Landlady
- The Jones Family in Big Business (1937) - Granny Jones
- The Life of Emile Zola (1937) - Madame Zola
- The Prisoner of Zenda (1937) - Duenna (scenes deleted)
- Hot Water (1937) - Granny Jones
- Borrowing Trouble (1937) - Granny Jones
- Love on a Budget (1938) - Granny Ida Jones
- A Trip to Paris (1938) - Granny Jones
- Safety in Numbers (1938) - Granny Jones
- Personal Secretary (1938) - Mrs. J. J. Farrell
- Down on the Farm (1938) - Granny Jones
- The Storm (1938) - Mrs. Roberts
- Everybody's Baby (1939) - Granny Jones
- The Jones Family in Hollywood (1939) - Granny Jones
- Quick Millions (1939) - Granny Jones
- Too Busy to Work (1939) - Granny Jones
- Abe Lincoln in Illinois (1940) - Mrs. Bowling Green
- Young as You Feel (1940) - Granny Jones
- Double Alibi (1940) - Landlady (uncredited)
- On Their Own (1940) - Granny Jones (final film role)
