= Kenneth Howell =

American actor

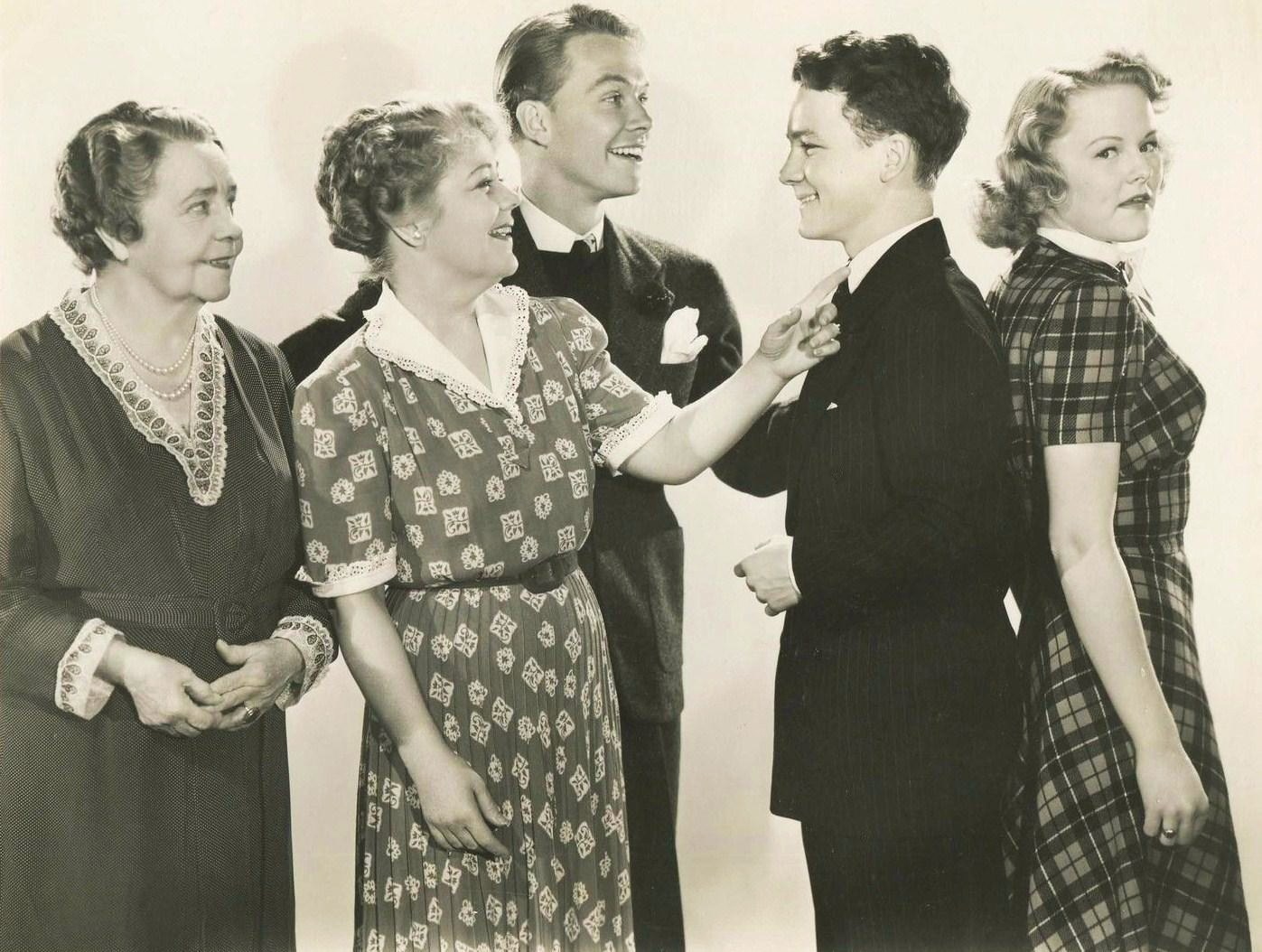
Kenneth Howell (third from left) in the Jones Family film On Their Own (1940)

Kenneth Howell (February 21, 1913 - September 28, 1966) was an American actor. He is best remembered for roles in films such as Pardon My Pups (1934), The Wrong Way Out (1938), Pride of the Bowery (1940) and Ball of Fire (1941), in which he played a college boy. He also played Jack Jones in the 17 low-budget Jones Family films, beginning with Every Saturday Night (1936) and ending with On Their Own (1940).

Howell was born in Los Angeles. He joined the Navy during World War II as a medical corpsman, but once he returned to the film business he was not able to revive his career. His last film role was In Old Amarillo (1951). Howell was married to Marguerite A. Thomson from 1942 to 1945, divorcing her after he realized he was gay. They had one daughter, Stephanie, born in September 1943, however, Howell did not remain in her life after 1948 when she was five years of age. His death at age 53, in Long Beach, California, resulted from a self-inflicted gunshot, reportedly a suicide.

== Partial filmography ==
- 1933: The Ironmaster - Party Boy (uncredited)
- 1933: The Eagle and the Hawk - John Stevens
- 1933: Ladies Must Love - Messenger (uncredited)
- 1933: Saturday's Millions - Student (uncredited)
- 1934: Eight Girls in a Boat - Student (uncredited)
- 1934: Pardon My Pups (Short) - Harry Vanderpool
- 1934: I Give My Love - Frank Howard
- 1934: She Had to Choose - Announcer
- 1935: Old Man Rhythm - College Boy (uncredited)
- 1935: Annapolis Farewell - David David (uncredited)
- 1935: One Way Ticket - Boy (uncredited)
- 1936: The Little Red Schoolhouse - Schuyler Tree
- 1936: Every Saturday Night - Jack Evers
- 1936: Melody in May (Short) - Chuck Benton
- 1936: Educating Father - Jack Jones
- 1936: Back to Nature - Jack Jones
- 1936: Four Days' Wonder - Tom Fenton
- 1937: Off to the Races - Jack Jones
- 1937: A Star Is Born - Milton Rails (uncredited)
- 1937: The Jones Family in Big Business - Jack Jones
- 1937: Hot Water - Jack Jones
- 1937: Borrowing Trouble - Jack Jones
- 1938: Love on a Budget - Jack Jones
- 1938: A Trip to Paris - Jack Jones
- 1938: Safety in Numbers - Jack Jones
- 1938: Girls' School - Edgar
- 1938: Down on the Farm - Jack Jones
- 1938: The Wrong Way Out (Short) - Windy Brown
- 1939: Everybody's Baby - Jack Jones
- 1939: The Jones Family in Hollywood - Jack Jones
- 1939: Quick Millions - Jack Jones
- 1939: Too Busy to Work - Jack Jones
- 1940: Young as You Feel - Jack Jones
- 1940: On Their Own - Jack Jones
- 1940: Junior G-Men (Serial) - Harry Trent
- 1940: Pride of the Bowery - Alan
- 1941: Nice Girl? - Pete (uncredited)
- 1941: Her First Beau - Roger Van Vleck
- 1941: Hurry, Charlie, Hurry - Jerry Grant
- 1941: Henry Aldrich for President - Irwin Barrett
- 1941: Ball of Fire - College Boy
- 1942: Girls' Town - Kenny Lane
- 1942: Scattergood Rides High - Phillip Dane
- 1942: Sweater Girl - Miles Tucker
- 1942: Orchestra Wives - Teen Ager (uncredited)
- 1945: The Master Key (Serial) - Boys' Club Member (uncredited)
- 1951: In Old Amarillo - Phil Hills (final film role)
