= Small Town Boy (film) =

1937 film by Glenn Tryon

- Directed by: Glenn Tryon
- Written by: Glenn Tryon
- Produced by: Zion Myers
- Starring: See below
- Cinematography: Edward Snyder
- Edited by: James B. Morley
- Distributed by: Grand National Pictures
- Release date: September 24, 1937
- Running time: 63 minutes
- Country: United States
- Language: English

Small Town Boy is a 1937 American film directed by Glenn Tryon.

Henry Armstrong is a man who still believes in Santa Claus, and that "Honesty is the best policy". He finds a thousand dollar bill on the sidewalk, and being honest, advertises the find. No one claims it, he keeps it, and becomes a changed man, more aggressive.

== Cast ==
- Stuart Erwin as Henry Armstrong
- Joyce Compton as Molly Summers
- Jed Prouty as Otis Armstrong
- Clara Blandick as Mrs. Armstrong
- Dorothy Appleby as Sandra French
- James Blakeley as Eddie Armstrong
- Clarence Wilson as Curtis French
- John T. Murray as C. Lafferty
- Lew Kelly as The Judge
- Victor Potel as Abner Towner
- Erville Alderson as Mr. Trindle
- William Ruhl as A Waiter
- George Chandler as Bill Clipper
- Henry Roquemore as Ted Fritter
