= Laughing at Trouble =

1936 film by Frank R. Strayer

- Directed by: Frank R. Strayer
- Screenplay by: Robert Ellis; Helen Logan based on the play by Adelyn Bushnell
- Produced by: Max Golden
- Starring: Jane Darwell; Brook Byron; Allan Lane; Sara Haden; Lois Wilson; Margaret Hamilton
- Cinematography: Barney McGill
- Edited by: Nick DeMaggio
- Production company: 20th Century Fox
- Distributed by: 20th Century Fox
- Release date: December 11, 1936
- Running time: 67 minutes
- Country: United States
- Language: English

Laughing at Trouble is a 1936 American comedy film directed by Frank R. Strayer and written by Robert Ellis and Helen Logan. The film stars Jane Darwell, Brook Byron, Allan Lane, Sara Haden, Lois Wilson, and Margaret Hamilton. The film was released on December 11, 1936, by 20th Century Fox.

== Cast ==
- Jane Darwell as Glory Bradford
- Brook Byron as Mary Bradford
- Allan Lane as John Campbell
- Sara Haden as Mrs. Jennie Nevins
- Lois Wilson as Alice Mathews
- Margaret Hamilton as Lizzie Beadle
- Pert Kelton as Ella McShane
- John Carradine as Deputy Sheriff Alec Brady
- James Burke as Sheriff Bill Norton
- Russell Hicks as Cyrus Hall
- Eddie Acuff as Jamie Bradford
- Frank Reicher as Dr. Larson
- William "Billy" Benedict as Wilbur
- Edward McWade as Harvey
