= Hitch Hike to Heaven =

1936 film by Frank R. Strayer

- Directed by: Frank R. Strayer
- Written by: Robert Ellis; Helen Logan
- Starring: Henrietta Crosman; Herbert Rawlinson; Russell Gleason
- Cinematography: M.A. Anderson
- Edited by: Roland D. Reed
- Production company: Invincible Pictures
- Distributed by: Chesterfield Pictures
- Release date: March 12, 1936
- Running time: 66 minutes
- Country: United States
- Language: English

Hitch Hike to Heaven (alternative title Footlights and Shadows) is a 1936 American drama film directed by Frank R. Strayer and starring Henrietta Crosman, Herbert Rawlinson and Russell Gleason.

== Plot ==
An actor becomes arrogant after enjoying success in Hollywood and neglects his wife and son.

== Cast ==
- Henrietta Crosman as Deborah Delaney
- Herbert Rawlinson as Melville Delaney
- Russell Gleason as Daniel Delaney
- Polly Ann Young as Jerry Daley
- Al Shean as Herman Blatz
- Anita Page as Claudia Revelle
- Syd Saylor as Spud
- Harry Harvey as Gabby
- Harry Holman as Philmore Tubbs
- Ethel Sykes as Kitty O'Brien
- Lela Bliss as Nadia De La Ney
- Crauford Kent as Edgar
- John Dilson as Charlie Reed

== Bibliography ==
- Michael R. Pitts. Poverty Row Studios, 1929-1940: An Illustrated History of 55 Independent Film Companies, with a Filmography for Each. McFarland & Company, 2005.
