= Eddie Collins (actor) =

American actor (1883–1940)

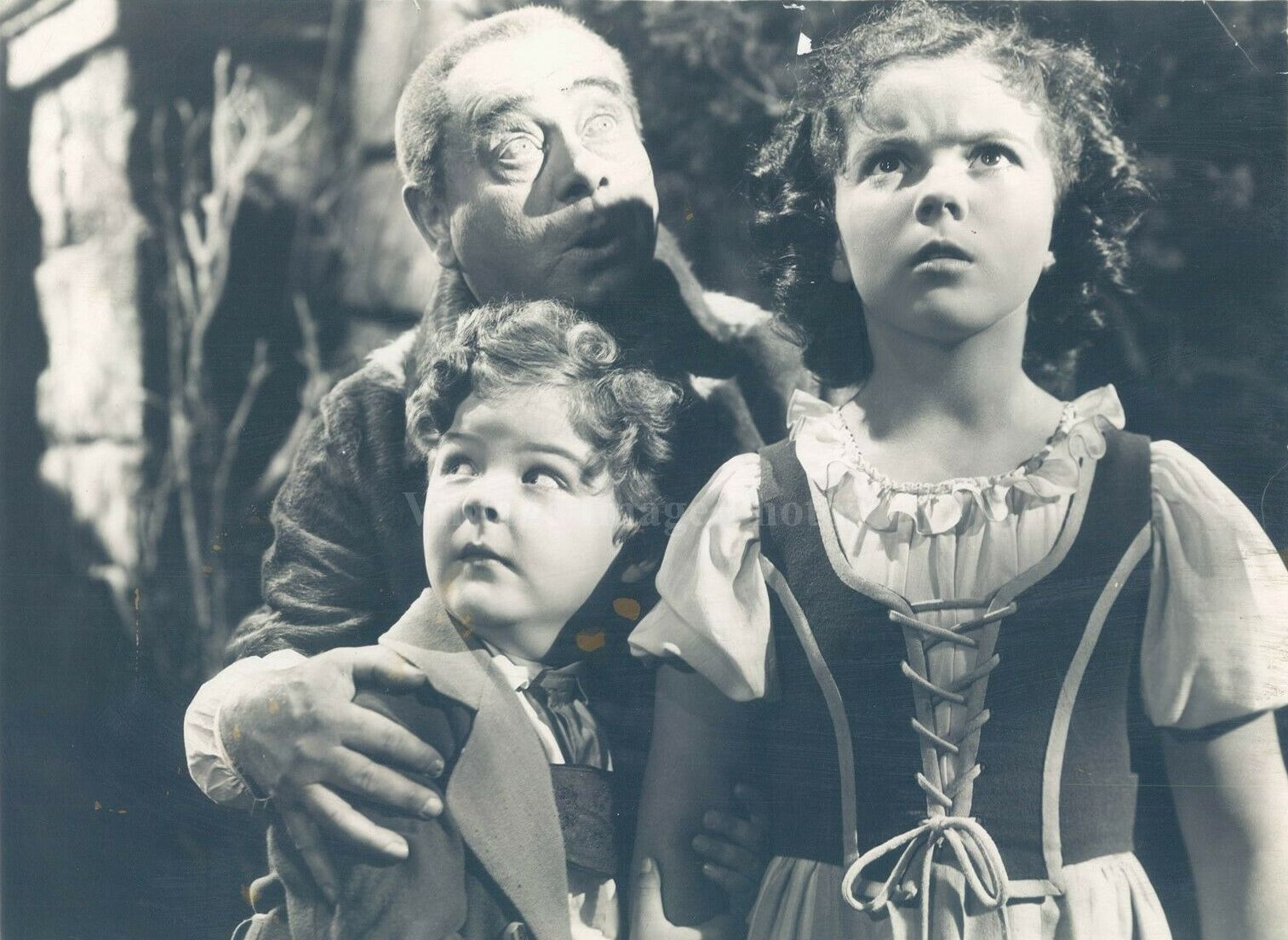
- Collins with Johnny Russell and Shirley Temple in The Blue Bird (1940)
- Born: Edward Bernard Collins; January 30, 1883; Jersey City, New Jersey, U.S.
- Died: September 2, 1940 (aged 57); Arcadia, California, U.S.
- Occupation: Actor
- Years active: 1905–1940
- Spouse: Florence Wilmot (m. 1921)

Edward Bernard Collins (January 30, 1883 – September 2, 1940) was an American actor. He is best remembered for voicing Dopey in Disney's Snow White and the Seven Dwarfs (1937) and for portraying Tylo in the Shirley Temple film The Blue Bird (1940).

== Early years ==
Collins was born in Jersey City, New Jersey.

== Career ==
He began working in vaudeville in 1905 and started working in burlesque around 1925. An animator for Walt Disney Productions saw him in a burlesque show and suggested that Disney hire him as a live-action reference model for Dopey in Snow White and the Seven Dwarfs (1937). In the film, Dopey is clumsy and mute, with Happy explaining that he has simply "never tried" to speak. In the movie's trailer, Walt Disney describes Dopey as "nice, but sort of silly". In addition to providing Dopey's vocalizations, Collins also recorded sneezing sounds for the film's chipmunk and squirrel characters. After completing his work for the film, Disney wrote a letter to the casting director of 20th Century-Fox and Collins was put under contract to the studio. Collins appeared in twenty-five films.

Next to Dopey, Collins's most-beloved role is that of Tylo, a dog who is magically transformed into a human, in The Blue Bird (1940). Upon being transformed, Tylo follows his mistress Mytyl (Shirley Temple) on a quest to find the famed "Bluebird of happiness". Collins's interpretation of Tylo is that of an easily spooked, but loyal companion who will do anything for those he loves. He died of a heart attack in September 1940, age 57, just weeks after the premiere of his last film The Return of Frank James.

== Filmography ==
- Diamond Jim (1935) as Bicycle Act (film debut) (uncredited)
- Married Before Breakfast (1937) as Tramp at Fire (uncredited)
- Ali Baba Goes to Town (1937) as Arab (uncredited)
- Snow White and the Seven Dwarfs (1937) as Dopey (vocal effects and live-action reference only, uncredited)
- In Old Chicago (1937) as Drunk
- Penrod and His Twin Brother (1938) as Captain
- Sally, Irene and Mary (1938) as Ship's Captain
- Kentucky Moonshine (1938) as 'Spats' Swanson
- Alexander's Ragtime Band (1938) as Corporal Collins
- Josette (1938) as Customs Inspector (uncredited)
- Little Miss Broadway (1938) as Band member
- Down on the Farm (1938) as Cyrus Sampson
- Always in Trouble (1938) as Uncle Ed Darlington
- Up the River (1938) as Fisheye Conroy
- Charlie Chan in Honolulu (1939) as Al Hogan
- Young Mr. Lincoln (1939) as Efe Turner
- Charlie Chan in Reno (1939) as The Gabby Cabbie
- News Is Made at Night (1939) as Billiard
- Quick Millions (1939) as Henry 'Beaver' Howard
- Stop, Look and Love (1939) as Dinty
- Hollywood Cavalcade (1939) as Keystone Cop Driver
- Drums Along the Mohawk (1939) as Christian Reall
- Heaven with a Barbed Wire Fence (1939) as Bill
- The Blue Bird (1940) as Tylo
- The Return of Frank James (1940) as Station agent at Eldora (final film role)
