= Pardon My Pups =

1934 film by Charles Lamont

Pardon My Pups is a 1934 Shirley Temple short film.

== Plot ==
A young boy named Sonny Rogers wants a motorcycle for his birthday but his stubborn father insists on getting an expensive hunting dog instead even though Sonny hates dogs and the father blatantly just wants the dog for himself. Sonny runs away from home but ends up returning with a pregnant lost dog he found, but the father orders him to take her to the pound to be put down. Sonny hides the dog instead. The father later realizes that the dog was actually Queeny, the mother of the unborn pup he was planning to buy. When Harry, Queeny's owner, finds Queeny where Sonny was hiding her, Harry attempts to beat her for running away but Sonny stops him and the two fight. In the end Sonny wins the fight and forces Harry to let him keep Queeny.

== Cast ==
- Frank Coghlan Jr. as Sonny Rogers
- Shirley Temple as Mary Lou Rogers
- Kenneth Howell as Harry Vanderpool
- Dorothy Ward as Phyllis
- Harry Myers as Mr. Rogers
- Virginia True Boardman as Mrs. Rogers
