= Shirley Deane =

American actress (1913–1983)

- Born: Shirley Deane Blattenberger; March 16, 1913; Fresno, California
- Died: April 26, 1983 (aged 70); Glendale, California, U.S.
- Occupation: Actress
- Years active: 1933–1940
- Spouse: Thomas Kettering Jr. (m. 1941)

Shirley Deane (born Shirley Deane Blattenberger; March 16, 1913 – April 26, 1983) was an American film actress.

== Early years ==
Born in Fresno, California, to Jesse H. Blattenberger and his wife Zola (née Redden), she was raised by her maternal grandmother.

== Career ==
Deane was best known as an actress for playing "Bonnie Jones" in 20th Century Fox's Jones Family series of films. She was under contract with 20th Century Fox, and she acted in Prairie Moon (1936), the Flash Gordon serial, and some of the Charlie Chan films. She was the original choice for the title role in the Blondie film series, a role that went to Penny Singleton after Deane was considered to be "too harsh when she nagged Dagwood", while Singleton came across as softer and sweeter.

Deane also toured in revues, singing "some stirring patriotic and soft sentimental numbers". She was the headline attraction in Star Dust Revue, a stage show that toured the southern United States in 1942, and she performed in U. S. military camps.

== Personal life and death ==
On December 20, 1941, Dean married theatrical agent Thomas Kettering Jr. in Reno, Nevada. Deane left the film business in the 1940s, when she began her family. She died of cancer in Glendale Memorial Hospital in Glendale, California, on April 26, 1983, aged 70.

== Filmography ==
Year	Title	Role	Notes
1933	Dancing Lady	Chorus Girl	Uncredited
1934	Stand Up and Cheer!	Dancer	Uncredited
1935	Dante's Inferno	Passenger in Boiler Room	Uncredited
1935	Redheads on Parade	Minor Role	Uncredited
1935	Metropolitan	Girl Who Sings Flat	Uncredited
1936	King of Burlesque	Phyllis Sears	
1936	Charlie Chan at the Circus	Louise Norman	
1936	The First Baby	Trudy Wells	
1936	Educating Father	Bonnie Jones	
1936	Girls' Dormitory	Fritzi	
1936	Back to Nature	Bonnie Jones	
1936	One in a Million	Girl in Band	
1937	On the Avenue	Chorus Girl	Uncredited
1937	Off to the Races	Bonnie Jones	
1937	Nancy Steele Is Missing!	Nancy	
1937	The Jones Family in Big Business	Bonnie Jones	
1937	Hot Water	Bonnie Jones	
1937	Borrowing Trouble	Bonnie Jones	
1938	Love on a Budget	Bonnie Thompson	
1938	A Trip to Paris	Bonnie Thompson	
1938	Safety in Numbers	Bonnie Thompson	
1938	Prairie Moon	Peggy Shaw	
1939	Everybody's Baby	Bonnie Thompson	
1939	Undercover Agent	Betty Madison	
1940	Flash Gordon Conquers the Universe	Princess Aura	Serial
1940	Private Affairs	First Girl in Bridge Game	Uncredited (final film role)

== Bibliography ==
- Tucker, David C. The Women Who Made Television Funny: Ten Stars of 1950s Sitcoms. McFarland, 2015.
