= Chester Gore =

American art director (1893–1966)

- Born: August 25, 1893; Santa Rosa, California, United States
- Died: February 20, 1966 (aged 72); Sonoma, California; United States
- Occupation: Art director
- Years active: 1925-1953 (film)

Chester Gore (1893–1966) was an American art director. He worked on more than fifty films during his career. At Twentieth Century Fox he worked on series films such as Charlie Chan, Mr. Moto and the Jones Family.

== Selected filmography ==
- Charlie Chan at the Olympics (1937)
- Love on a Budget (1938)
- Mr. Moto on Danger Island (1939)
- The Honeymoon's Over (1939)
- News Is Made at Night (1939)
- Charlie Chan in Panama (1940)
- Charlie Chan's Murder Cruise (1940)
- Small Town Deb (1941)
- Father Was a Fullback (1949)
- Two Flags West (1950)
- MacDonald of the Canadian Mounties (1952)

== Bibliography ==
- Stephens, Michael L. Art Directors in Cinema: A Worldwide Biographical Dictionary. McFarland, 1998.
