= Quick Millions (1939 film) =

1939 film by Malcolm St. Clair

- Directed by: Malcolm St. Clair
- Written by: Buster Keaton (story); Joseph Hoffman (story)
- Produced by: John Stone
- Starring: Jed Prouty; Spring Byington
- Edited by: Harry Reynolds
- Distributed by: 20th Century-Fox
- Release date: August 25, 1939
- Running time: 62 minutes
- Country: United States
- Language: English

Quick Millions is a 1939 American comedy film directed by Malcolm St Clair and co-written by Buster Keaton, one of the series of seventeen 20th Century Studios Jones Family films beginning with Every Saturday Night (1936) and ending with On Their Own (1940).

Spring Byington appeared in all seventeen, while Jed Prouty appeared in all but the last one. Quick Millions is one of the two Jones Family films with gags and a story line provided by Keaton, briefly moonlighting from MGM for his old friend Malcolm St. Clair, director of seven in Jones Family series.

== Plot ==
After returning from an adventure in Hollywood, patriarch Jones na d his clan discover they have inherited a gold mine from his uncle Ezra. When the family travels to the Grand Canyon to inspect the claim, they are approached by swindlers, who assure them that they have inherited a rich gold mine. At the remote mountain cabin, John Jones and his brood discover no fortune. Mr. Jones is almost fleeced by a fraudulent collector of Indian artifacts, and is soon mistaken for a notorious bank robber by the local sheriff. Son Jack and daughter Lucy seek romance with undesirables. After a number of misadventures, the Jones' safely escape back to their small town.

== Cast ==
- Jed Prouty as John Jones
- Spring Byington as Mrs. John Jones
- Kenneth Howell as Jack Jones
- George Ernest as Roger Jones
- June Carlson as Lucy Jones
- Florence Roberts as Granny Jones
- Billy Mahan as Bobby Jones
- Eddie Collins as Henry 'Beaver' Howard
- Robert Shaw as National Park Ranger Barry Frazier
- Helen Ericson as Daisy Landers
- Marvin Stephens as Tommy McGuire
- Paul Hurst as Sheriff
- John T. Murray as Professor Pete Mathews
- George Lynn as H. Jenkins 'Hank' Pierson
- Horace McMahon as Floyd 'Bat' Douglas
- John Sheehan as Fire Chief
- Eddie Dunn as Deputy Sheriff
- George Guhl as Deputy and Jailer
- Billy Griffith as Druggist
- Edwin Gaffney as Gas Station Attendant
- Edward McWade as Storekeeper
- Arthur Rankin as Notary
- Clarence Wilson as Assayer
- Douglas Gerrard as Indian

== Reception ==
Frank Nugent in the New York Times rates Quick Millions "the weakest entertainment to date" in the Jones Family saga, but finds merit in vaudevillian Eddie Collins in the role of Henry "Beaver" Howard, "who practically steals the show."

== Film archival status ==
Film archivist Ruth Anne Dwyer reports that a copy of Quick Millions exists only on "delicate nitrate stock," and, as such, is unavailable for viewing.

And yet you can see Quick Millions here,
