= The Return of Frank James =

1940 film directed by Fritz Lang

- The Return of Frank James movie poster
- Directed by: Fritz Lang
- Written by: Sam Hellman
- Produced by: Darryl F. Zanuck; Kenneth Macgowan (associate producer)
- Starring: Henry Fonda; Gene Tierney; Jackie Cooper; Henry Hull; John Carradine; J. Edward Bromberg; Donald Meek; Eddie Collins; George Barbier
- Cinematography: George Barnes
- Edited by: Walter A. Thompson
- Music by: David Buttolph
- Production company: 20th Century Fox
- Distributed by: 20th Century Fox
- Release date: August 16, 1940
- Running time: 92 minutes
- Country: United States
- Language: English

The Return of Frank James is a 1940 Western film directed by Fritz Lang and starring Henry Fonda and Gene Tierney. It is a sequel to Henry King's 1939 film Jesse James. Written by Sam Hellman, the film loosely follows the life of Frank James following the death of his outlaw brother, Jesse James, at the hands of the Ford brothers. The film is universally considered historically inaccurate, but was a commercial success. It was the first motion picture for the actress Gene Tierney, who plays a reporter for the newspaper The Denver Star.

== Plot ==
After the death of his outlaw brother, Jesse, Frank James seeks revenge on his killers, Bob and Charlie Ford.

== Cast ==
- Henry Fonda as Frank James
- Gene Tierney as Eleanor Stone
- Jackie Cooper as Clem
- Henry Hull as Major Rufus Cobb
- John Carradine as Bob Ford
- J. Edward Bromberg as George Runyan
- Donald Meek as McCoy
- Eddie Collins as Station Agent
- George Barbier as Judge
- Russell Hicks as Prosecutor
- Ernest Whitman as Pinky
- Charles Tannen as Charlie Ford
- Lloyd Corrigan as Randolph Stone
- Victor Kilian as Preacher
- Edward McWade as Colonel Jackson
- George Chandler as Roy
- Irving Bacon as Bystander
- Frank Shannon as Sheriff
- Barbara Pepper as Nellie Blane
- Louie Mason as Watchman, Wilson
- Stymie Beard as Mose
- William Pawley and Frank Sully as Actors
- Davidson Clark as Officer
- Robert McKenzie as Old Man on Rocker (uncredited)
- Adrian Morris as Denver Detective (uncredited)
- Lillian Yarbo as Eleanor's Maid (uncredited)

== Production ==
The railroad scenes were filmed on the Sierra Railroad in Tuolumne County, California.

== Preservation ==
The Academy Film Archive preserved The Return of Frank James in 2000.

== Reception ==
On the review aggregator website Rotten Tomatoes, the film has a 71% approval rating, based on 5 reviews. In a mixed contemporary review for Variety, the film staff wrote, "Frank's no cinematic match for Jesse, which appears to be Will Hay's fault more than anyone else's. Rule 16a in the book is that a bad man can't be a hero... Effort to put wings on Frank is too much. Angelic aspect bogs the plot and instead of flying it can do no better than plod for a slow 92 minutes."
