= Helen Logan =

American screenwriter (1906–1989)

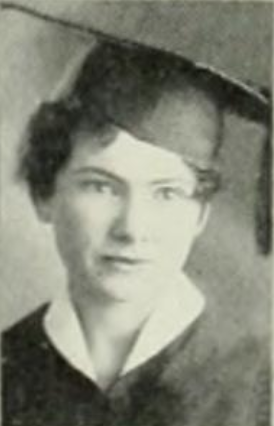
- Helen Logan, from the 1927 UCLA yearbook
- Born: December 13, 1906; Los Angeles, California, US
- Died: January 15, 1989 (age 82); Los Angeles, California, US
- Other name: Helen Logan Reel
- Education: University of California at Los Angeles
- Occupation: Screenwriter
- Years active: 1935–1950 (film)
- Spouse: Robert Ellis

Helen Logan Reel (December 13, 1906 – January 15, 1989) was an American screenwriter active in Hollywood from 1935 to 1950. She wrote screenplays with her partner (later husband) Robert Ellis.

== Early life and education ==
Helen Logan was born in Los Angeles, California, to William Edson Logan and Ida Jane Busick Logan. She graduated from the University of California, Los Angeles in 1927, and she was a charter member of the university's chapter of the Alpha Delta Pi sorority in 1925.

== Career ==
Logan began working at Fox as a script reader before moving up the ranks to be a script clerk. Eventually she wrote her own screenplays for Fox, working on two popular franchises, Charlie Chan and the Jones Family. She also co-wrote the screenplay for a Shirley Temple movie, Susannah of the Mounties (1939). Later she worked on wartime musical films, including Hello, Frisco, Hello (1943) with Alice Faye.

Logan wrote many of her scripts in collaboration with writer-director-actor Robert Ellis. They began working with around 1934 and married at some point after 1940. Ellis and Logan had separate contracts but made the same salary.

== Personal life ==
Logan married her longtime colleague Robert Ellis Reel in 1962, after decades together. In 1938, Ellis was sued by actress Vera Reynolds for $150,000; Reynolds alleged that Ellis had promised to marry her but instead took a trip to Mexico with Logan. Ellis died in 1974, and she died in 1989, in Los Angeles, at the age of 82. Writing Chan, a video documentary about the Logan/Ellis writing team was produced in 2008, and included as extra content on a DVD box set of the Charlie Chan films.

== Selected filmography ==
- Charlie Chan in Egypt (1935)
- Ladies Love Danger (1935)
- The Lady in Scarlet (1935)
- ¡Asegure a su Mujer! (Secure Your Wife) (1935)
- Back to Nature (1936)
- Red Lights Ahead (1936)
- Footlights and Shadows (1936)
- Laughing at Trouble (1936)
- Charlie Chan's Secret (1936)
- Charlie Chan at the Circus (1936)
- Charlie Chan at the Race Track (1936)
- Charlie Chan at the Olympics (1937)
- Charlie Chan at Monte Carlo (1937)
- Charlie Chan on Broadway (1937)
- The Jones Family in Big Business (1937)
- Born Reckless (1937)
- Big Town Girl (1937)
- Off to the Races (1937)
- A Trip to Paris (1938)
- Rascals (1938)
- Too Busy to Work (1939)
- Charlie Chan in City in Darkness (1939)
- Susannah of the Mounties (1939)
- The Man Who Wouldn't Talk (1940)
- Star Dust (1940)
- Sun Valley Serenade (1941)
- A Right to the Heart (1941)
- The Great American Broadcast (1941)
- Iceland (1942)
- Hello, Frisco, Hello (1943)
- Pin Up Girl (1944)
- Something for the Boys (1944)
- Four Jills in a Jeep (1944)
- Greenwich Village (1944)
- Do You Love Me? (1946)
- I'll Get By (1950, story)
