= News Is Made at Night =

1939 film by Alfred L. Werker

- Theatrical release poster
- Directed by: Alfred L. Werker
- Screenplay by: John Larkin
- Produced by: Sol M. Wurtzel
- Starring: Preston Foster; Lynn Bari; Russell Gleason; George Barbier; Eddie Collins; Minor Watson
- Cinematography: Ernest Palmer
- Edited by: Nick DeMaggio
- Music by: Carl W. Stalling
- Production company: 20th Century Fox
- Distributed by: 20th Century Fox
- Release date: July 21, 1939
- Running time: 75 minutes
- Country: United States
- Language: English

News Is Made at Night is a 1939 American comedy film directed by Alfred L. Werker and written by John Larkin. The film stars Preston Foster, Lynn Bari, Russell Gleason, George Barbier, Eddie Collins and Minor Watson. The film was released on July 21, 1939, by 20th Century Fox.

== Cast ==
- Preston Foster as Steve Drum
- Lynn Bari as Maxine Thomas
- Russell Gleason as Albert Hockman
- George Barbier as Clanahan
- Eddie Collins as Billiard
- Minor Watson as Charles Coulton AKA Clifford Mussey
- Charles Halton as Lt. Governor Elmer Hinge
- Paul Harvey as Inspector Melrose
- Richard Lane as Barney Basely
- Charles Lane as District Attorney Rufe Reynolds
- Betty Compson as Kitty Truman
- Paul Fix as Joe Luddy
- Paul Guilfoyle as Bat Randall
