= Russell Gleason =

American actor (1908–1945)

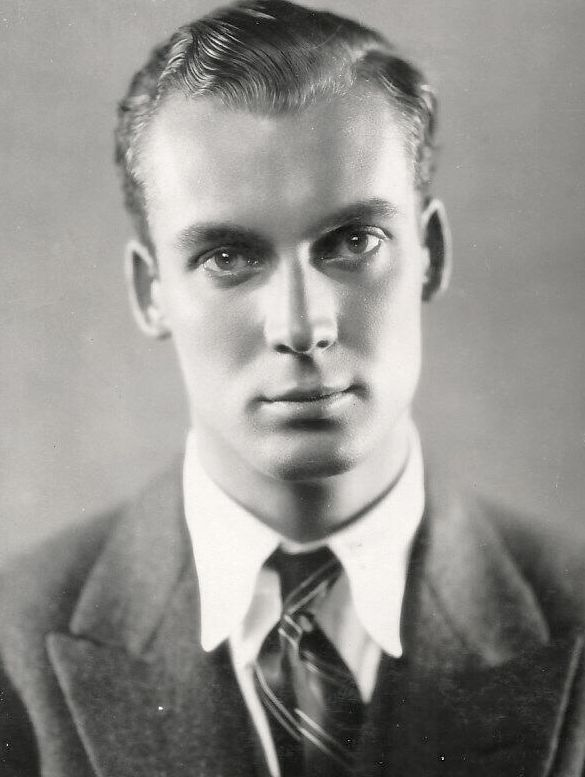
- Gleason in 1931
- Born: February 6, 1908; Portland, Oregon, U.S.
- Died: December 25, 1945 (aged 37); New York City, U.S.
- Resting place: Long Island National Cemetery, New York, U.S. 40.7511°N 73.3985°W
- Occupation: Actor
- Years active: 1929–1944
- Height: 6 ft 0 in (1.83 m)
- Spouse: Cynthia Lindsay (m. 1938)
- Children: 1
- Parent(s): James Gleason; Lucile Gleason

Russell Gleason (February 6, 1908 – December 25, 1945) (Note: Sources differ on both Gleason's birth year, as well as his date of death: The AllMovie Guide, as well as several others, state he was born in 1908. This is corroborated by New York City Municipal Death records. Some sources, however, such as David K. Frasier's Suicide in the Entertainment Industry (2002) allege his birth year to be 1907. The official New York City Municipal Death records corroborate his birth year as 1908, as do his U.S. army enlistment records from November 1943 in Los Angeles.; Some sources claim Gleason died December 26, 1945; however, the official New York City Municipal Death records list his death date as December 25, and his burial date as December 28, 1945. His death was also reported to be December 25 in a January 1946 issue of Billboard.) was an American actor who began his career at the very beginning of the talking film era. He was born into an acting family, the son of actors Lucille and James Gleason. He had an early screen role in the 1930 film All Quiet on the Western Front.

While still in the middle of a successful acting career, Gleason joined the U.S. Army in late 1943, during World War II. While awaiting deployment to Europe in December 1945 in New York City, Gleason fell to his death from a hotel window.

== Early life ==
Gleason was born to actors Lucile (née Webster) and James Gleason on February 6, 1908, in Portland, Oregon, where his parents were acting in local theater productions. As a child, Gleason appeared on stage in some of the theatrical productions put on by his parents. His debut occurred when he was carried on stage by his grandmother to appear with his mother in The Heir to the Hooray. Growing up, he lived with his maternal grandmother in Oakland, California. During school years, he rarely saw his parents, but he acted with them in stock theater during summer vacations.

== Career ==
Gleason's first foray into film was when he was 21, with a leading role in 1929's The Shady Lady, directed by Edward H. Griffith. The following year, he had a critical success in his role of Private Mueller in the Oscar-winning film, All Quiet on the Western Front. His short career only spanned 15 years, during which time he appeared in over 50 feature films, mostly in featured or starring roles. In 1933, he acted on the stage in a showcase known for its connections to Hollywood, Harold Lloyd's Beverly Hills Little Theatre for Professionals. He appeared with both of his parents in the film series surrounding the Higgins Family, of which nine films were made from 1938 to 1941. The Gleasons appeared in seven of those films, the last one being Grandpa Goes to Town in 1940 (the last two "Higgins" films were made with other actors). He also appeared in the Jones Family series, produced by 20th Century Fox.

After making his last film, The Adventures of Mark Twain, which finished production in September 1942, he joined the Army. His final four pictures all were released in 1944, after he was already in the service.

== Personal life ==
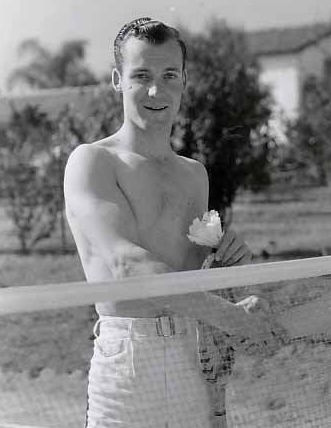
Gleason in Beverly Hills, California, 1932

Early in his career, he was romantically linked with Mary Brian. Gleason was married to Cynthia Hobart (later Cynthia Lindsay), who was a stunt woman and swimmer, and later wrote a biography of Boris Karloff. The entire Gleason family was close friends with Karloff, and the young couple became the godparents to Karloff's daughter, Sara Jane. Hobart also co-wrote George Burns' autobiography with the actor. The Gleasons had a son, Michael, on June 1, 1939. After Russell Gleason's death, Cynthia remarried, to Lou Lindsay, and Michael took his step-father's last name, and went on to become a television producer.

== Death ==
On December 25, 1945, Gleason was in New York City awaiting deployment to Europe with his regiment, when he fell to his death out of a fourth-story window in the Hotel Sutton on East 56th Street in Manhattan, which the Army had commandeered to house the troops. Law enforcement was unable to determine whether Gleason's fall from the window had been accidental or a suicide. Some publications, such as Variety, had reported that Gleason had been prescribed a sulfonamide to treat a cold at the time, and that the drug had resulted in grogginess that led his accidental fall.

He was interred at the Long Island National Cemetery, a military cemetery, on December 28, 1945.

== Filmography ==
- (Per AFI database)

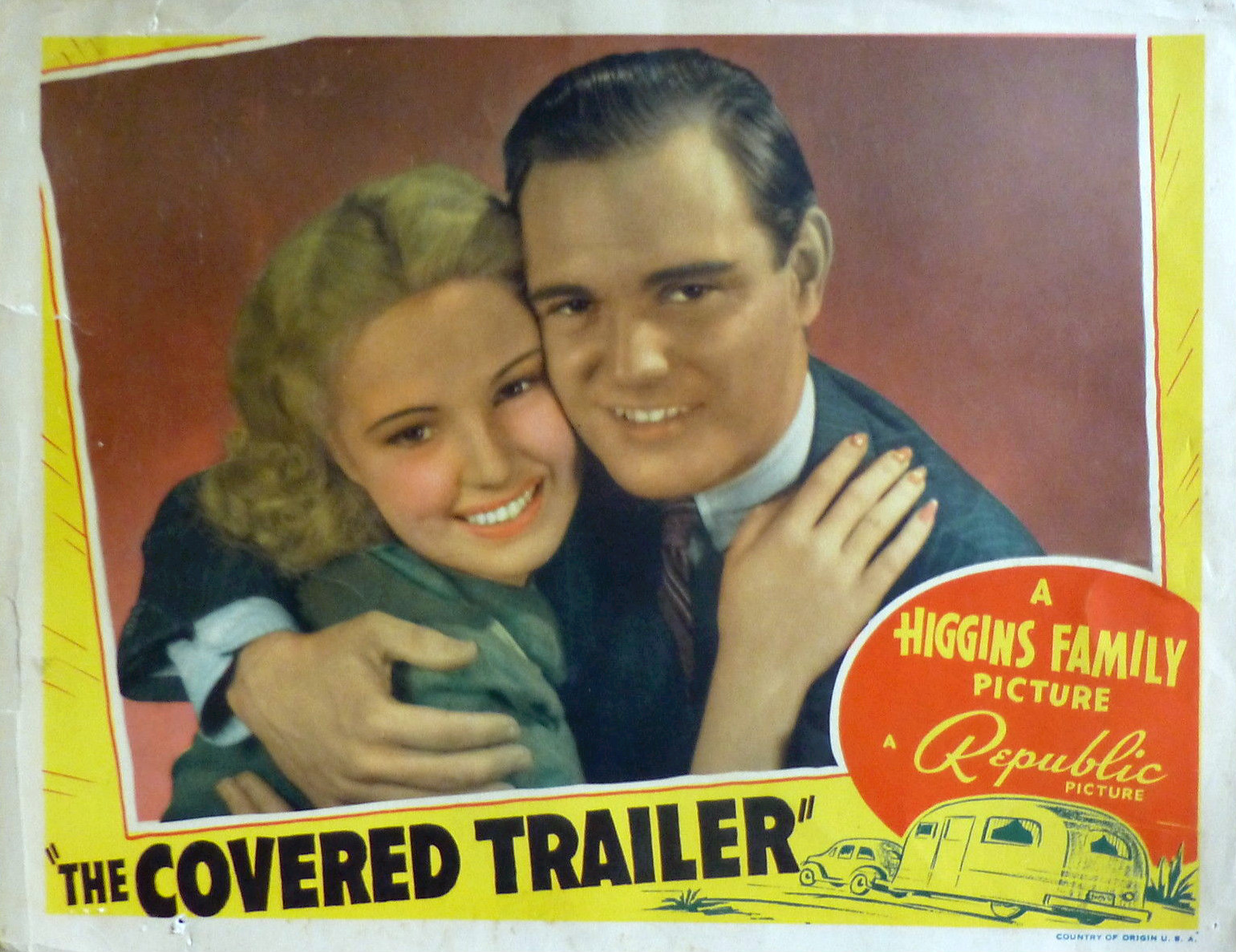
Gleason and Mary Beth Hughes in the 1939 film. The Covered Trailer

Year	Title	Role	Notes
1928	The Shady Lady	Haley	
1929	The Flying Fool	Jimmy Taylor	
1929	Seven Faces	Georges Dufeyel	
1929	The Sophomore	Dutch	
1929	Strange Cargo	Hungerford	
1930	All Quiet on the Western Front	Private Müller	
1930	Officer O'Brien	Johnny Dale	
1930	Sisters	Eddie	
1931	Beyond Victory	Russell "Bud"	
1931	The Homicide Squad	Joe Riley	
1931	Laugh and Get Rich	Larry Owens	
1931	Nice Women	Billy Wells	
1932	The Strange Case of Clara Deane	Norman Ware	
1933	Private Jones	Williams	
1934	I Can't Escape	Tom Martin	
1935	Hot Tip	Ben Johnson	
1935	Condemned to Live	David	
1936	Hitch Hike to Heaven	Daniel Delaney	
1936	A Tenderfoot Goes West	Pike	
1937	The Jones Family in Big Business	Herbert Thompson	
1937	Off to the Races	Herbert Thompson	
1937	Borrowing Trouble	Herbert Thompson	
1937	Hot Water	Herbert Thompson	
1938	Fury Below	Jim Cole, 3rd	
1938	The Higgins Family	Sidney Higgins (first of a series)	
1938	A Trip to Paris	Herbert Thompson	
1938	Safety in Numbers	Herbert Thompson	
1938	Love on a Budget	Herbert Thompson	
1938	Down on the Farm	Herbert Thompson	
1939	Should Husbands Work?	Sidney Higgins	
1939	My Wife's Relatives	Sidney Higgins	
1939	Here I Am a Stranger	Tom Sortwell	
1939	Undercover Agent	William Trent	
1939	Everybody's Baby	Herbert Thompson	
1939	The Covered Trailer	Sidney Higgins	
1939	News Is Made at Night	Albert Hockman	
1939	Money to Burn	Sidney Higgins	
1940	Earl of Puddlestone	Sidney Higgins	
1940	Grandpa Goes to Town	Sidney Higgins	
1940	Yesterday's Heroes	Bill Garrett	
1940	Young as You Feel	Herbert Thompson	
1941	Unexpected Uncle	Tommy Turner	
1942	Dudes Are Pretty People	Brad	
1942	Fingers at the Window	Ogilvie	
1943	Salute to the Marines	Private Hanks	
1943	Swing Shift Maisie	Inspector	
1943	Three Hearts for Julia	Jones	
1943	Seeing Hands (Short film)	Ben Helwig	Film nominated for an Academy Award for Best Short Subject, One-reel
1944	Lost Angel	Reporter	
1944	Swing Fever	Sergeant	
1944	Meet the People	Bill	
1944	The Adventures of Mark Twain	Orion Clemens	
