= Music in the Air (film) =

1934 film by Joe May

- Directed by: Joe May
- Written by: Jerome Kern (play); Oscar Hammerstein II (play); Howard Irving Young; Billy Wilder
- Produced by: Erich Pommer
- Starring: Gloria Swanson; John Boles; Douglass Montgomery
- Cinematography: Ernest Palmer
- Music by: Jerome Kern
- Production company: Fox Film Corporation
- Distributed by: Fox Film Corporation
- Release date: December 13, 1934
- Running time: 85 minutes
- Country: United States
- Language: English

Music in the Air is a 1934 American romantic comedy musical film based on Jerome Kern and Oscar Hammerstein II's Broadway musical of the same name. It was part of the popular subgenre of operetta films made during the era. The film was a commercial failure on its release, losing $389,000. This was the worst performing release by Fox Film that year.

The Broadway musical Music in the Air opened at the Alvin Theatre in New York City on November 8, 1932, and ran for 342 performances.

== Plot ==
Aspiring songwriter Karl Roder travels to the big city, along with a girl he is in love with, Sieglinde Lessing, and her father Walter Lessing, who has just written a new song that he thinks will take the world by storm (with lyrics by Karl).

They stumble into the stormy relationship of opera star Frieda Hotzfelt and librettist Bruno Mahler, who constantly bicker and make up. When the composer for their new show suddenly leaves town, they decide to use Walter's song, partially out of convenience and party due to the fact that Bruno has fallen in love with Sieglinde, and Frieda has fallen in love with Karl, though he does not reciprocate.

Karl, realizing the city is no place for him, decides to go back to the village, but Bruno convinces Sieglinde that she is destined for the stage, and she stays behind to replace Frieda as the prima donna in the opera. However, as the opening night approaches, the cast and crew all determine that Sieglinde cannot act, and they ask Frieda to come back and star in the show.

Walter calls them all cruel for breaking his daughter's heart, but they tell him that the audience is crueler, and they are being spared the worst of it. At the end of the day, the feelings of two amateurs are not more important than the livelihoods of the crew.

Sieglinde and Walter return to their town, and Sieglinde goes to apologize to Karl for not listening to him, but Walter can still be proud that his music is featured in a real show, and the whole town listens to it together on the radio. Meanwhile, Frieda and Bruno are together again and fighting again.

== Cast ==
- Gloria Swanson as Frieda Hotzfelt
- John Boles as Bruno Mahler
- Douglass Montgomery as Karl Roder
- June Lang as Sieglinde Lessing
- Al Shean as Dr. Walter Lessing
- Reginald Owen as Ernst Weber
- Joseph Cawthorn as Hans Uppman
- Hobart Bosworth as Cornelius
- Sara Haden as Martha
- Marjorie Main as Anna
- Roger Imhof as Burgomaster
- Jed Prouty as Kirschner
- Christian Rub as Zipfelhuber
- Fuzzy Knight as Nick
- George Chandler as Assistant Stage Manager
- Claire Rochelle as Dancer
- Donald Haines as Peanut Vendor (uncredited)

== Bibliography ==
- Solomon, Aubrey. The Fox Film Corporation, 1915-1935: A History and Filmography (McFarland, 2011).
