= Too Busy to Work (1939 film) =

1939 film by Otto Brower

- Film poster
- Directed by: Otto Brower
- Written by: George Kelly (playwright) (play); Howard Lindsay (play); Bertrand Robinson (play)
- Starring: Jed Prouty; Spring Byington; Kenneth Howell
- Distributed by: 20th Century Fox
- Release date: November 17, 1939
- Running time: 64 minutes
- Country: United States
- Language: English

Too Busy to Work is a 1939 American comedy film, directed by Otto Brower and starring Jed Prouty, Spring Byington, and Kenneth Howell. It was one of the Jones Family film series.
