= Jones Family =

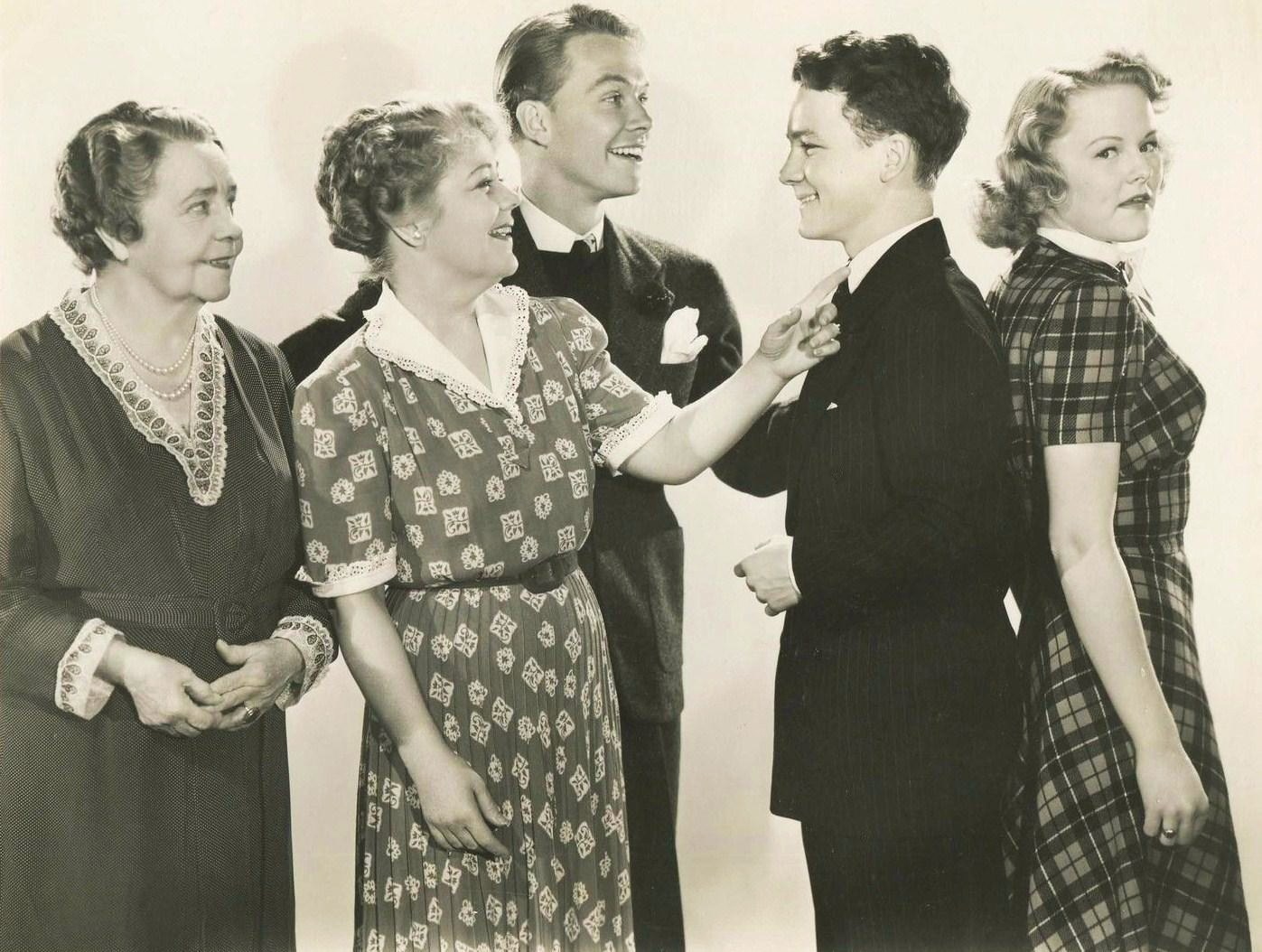
Florence Roberts, Spring Byington, Kenneth Howell, George Ernest and June Carlson in On Their Own (1940), the last film in the Jones Family series

The Jones Family film series is seventeen 20th Century Fox second feature family comedies produced between 1936 and 1940.

== Synopsis ==
Somewhat similar to the mildly comic tone of MGM's Andy Hardy and Columbia Pictures Blondie films, the Joneses started as the Evers in Every Saturday Night (1936). The family's name was changed to Jones in Educating Father (1936), which put Pa Jones in the spotlight. The emphasis on a none-too-perfect father figure is what distinguishes the Jones comedies from the Hardy pictures, which clearly belong to teenager Andy Hardy (Mickey Rooney). Jed Prouty played Mr. Jones, Spring Byington portrayed Mrs. Jones, veteran actress Florence Roberts was Grandma, Kenneth Howell was Jack, George Ernest was Roger, June Carlson was Lucy and Billy Mahan was Bobby in every film, with one exception: Prouty did not appear in the final entry. Bonnie was played by June Lang in the initial Every Saturday Night, Shirley Deane in ten films and Joan Valerie in the second-to-last one. Russell Gleason joined the cast as Bonnie's boyfriend, Herbert Thompson, in Off to the Races (1937). Herbert and Bonnie's wedding is never shown, but they first appear as a married couple in Love on a Budget (1938).

The directors were Malcolm St. Clair, Herbert I. Leeds, James Tinling and Frank R. Strayer. Gags and the story line for The Jones Family in Hollywood and Quick Millions were written by Buster Keaton, briefly moonlighting from MGM for his friend St. Clair.

Republic Pictures launched their own competing film series of mild family comedies, the Higgins Family. It was the subject of nine movies from 1939 through 1941, most featuring actor James Gleason, his real-life wife Lucile Gleason and their son Russell, who was still appearing in the Jones Family films.

== Filmography ==
- Every Saturday Night (1936)
- Educating Father (1936)
- Back to Nature (1936)
- Off to the Races (1937)
- Big Business (1937)
- Hot Water (working title "Too Much Limelight") (1937)
- Borrowing Trouble (1937)
- Love on a Budget (1938)
- A Trip to Paris (1938)
- Safety in Numbers (1938)
- Down on the Farm (1938)
- Everybody's Baby (1939)
- The Jones Family in Hollywood (1939)
- Quick Millions (1939)
- Too Busy to Work (1939)
- Young as You Feel (1940)
- On Their Own (1940)
