= Max Golden =

American film producer

- Born: December 25, 1895
- Died: March 2, 1976 (aged 80); Woodland Hills, California; United States
- Other name: Max H. Golden
- Occupations: Producer, Production Manager
- Years active: 1936–1953

Max Golden (1895–1976) was an American film producer. He was employed by 20th Century Fox where he worked on B films including the Jones Family series.

== Selected filmography ==
- Laughing at Trouble (1936)
- Educating Father (1936)
- Every Saturday Night (1936)
- The Jones Family in Big Business (1937)
- A Trip to Paris (1938)
- Hawaiian Nights (1939)

== Bibliography ==
- John J. McGowan. J.P. McGowan: Biography of a Hollywood Pioneer. McFarland, 2005.
