= Bernard Herzbrun =

American art director

- Born: January 10, 1891; New York City, New York
- Died: January 7, 1964 (aged 72); Los Angeles, California
- Occupation: Art director
- Years active: 1930-1955

Bernard Herzbrun (January 10, 1891 – January 7, 1964) was an American art director. He was nominated an Academy Award in the category Best Art Direction for the film Alexander's Ragtime Band. He worked on 275 films between 1930 and 1955. He was born in New York City, New York and died in Los Angeles, California.

== Selected filmography ==
- Alexander's Ragtime Band (1938)
- The Black Castle (1952)
