= Edward Snyder (cinematographer) =

American cinematographer

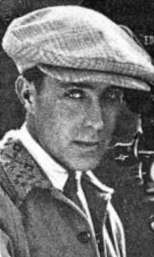
- Born: Edward Joseph Schneider; December 2, 1895; New York City, New York, United States
- Died: July 10, 1984 (aged 88); Los Angeles, California, United States
- Occupations: Cinematographer, special effects artist
- Years active: 1926–1948
- Spouse: Caroline (Carrie) Anna Schmeider

Edward Snyder, also known as Edward J. Snyder, (1895 – July 10, 1982) was an American cameraman, cinematographer (director of photography), and visual effects/special effects artist. Born in New York City in 1895, Snyder would break into the film industry as the director of photography on The Fighting Marine. a 1926 silent film that featured the only screen performance by boxing heavyweight champion Gene Tunney. Snyder would be one of the plethora of talented cameramen to work on the Howard Hughes' 1930 aerial classic, Hell's Angels, along with such other notable cameramen and future directors of photography, Paul Ivano, Henry Cronjager and Ernest Laszlo. It was as special effects artist that Snyder would have his greatest success, working on such classic films as Otto Preminger's Laura; George Cukor's Winged Victory; The Keys of the Kingdom, starring Gregory Peck; Elia Kazan's A Tree Grows in Brooklyn; Anna and the King of Siam, starring Irene Dunne and Rex Harrison. Snyder was nominated for an Academy Award for 1948's Deep Waters, losing to the special effects team of Portrait of Jennie). Snyder died in 1982.

== Filmography ==
(as per AFI's database)

Year	Title	Role	Notes
1926	The Fighting Marine	Director of photography	
1927	Hoof Marks	Director of photography	
1928	Fangs of Fate	Director of photography	
1928	Marked Money	Director of photography	
1928	A Bit of Heaven	Director of photography	
1929	Hawk of the Hills	Director of photography	
1930	Hell's Angels	Cameraman	
1930	Her Man	Director of photography	
1930	Pardon My Gun	Director of photography	
1930	Rogue of the Rio Grande	Director of photography	
1931	Lonely Wives	Director of photography	
1931	Sweepstakes	Director of photography	
1931	The Tip-Off	Director of photography	
1931	The Painted Desert	Director of photography	
1933	Destination Unknown	Director of photography	
1933	Jaws of Justice	Director of photography	
1933	They Just Had to Get Married	Director of photography	
1934	The Oil Raider	Director of photography	
1934	The Poor Rich	Director of photography	
1934	Madame Spy	Director of photography	
1935	Fighting Youth	Director of photography	
1935	His Night Out	Director of photography	
1936	The Last of the Mohicans	Cameraman	
1936	Sea Spoilers	Director of photography	
1936	Contra la corriente	Director of photography	
1936	The Harvester	Director of photography	
1937	The Jones Family in Big Business	Director of photography	
1937	Sweetheart of the Navy	Director of photography	
1937	Girl Loves Boy	Director of photography	
1937	Small Town Boy	Director of photography	
1937	Borrowing Trouble	Director of photography	
1937	Hot Water	Director of photography	
1937	Breezing Home	Director of photography	
1937	Escape by Night	Director of photography	
1937	Youth on Parole	Director of photography	
1938	Road Demon	Director of photography	
1938	Passport Husband	Director of photography	
1938	Speed to Burn	Director of photography	
1938	A Trip to Paris	Director of photography	
1938	Meet the Girls	Director of photography	
1938	Love on a Budget	Director of photography	
1938	Down on the Farm	Director of photography	
1939	I Was a Convict	Director of photography	
1939	Everybody's Baby	Director of photography	
1939	The Jones Family in Hollywood	Director of photography	
1940	Little Old New York	Cameraman	
1944	Laura	Special effects artist	
1944	Sunday Dinner for a Soldier	Special effects artist	
1944	Winged Victory	Special effects artist	
1945	The Keys of the Kingdom	Special effects artist	
1945	Doll Face	Special effects artist	
1945	Fallen Angel	Special effects artist	
1945	Hangover Square	Special effects artist	
1945	The Spider	Special effects artist	
1945	A Tree Grows in Brooklyn	Special effects artist	
1946	Leave Her to Heaven	Special effects artist	
1946	Anna and the King of Siam	Special effects artist	
1946	Centennial Summer	Special effects artist	
1946	Claudia and David	Special effects artist	
1946	Cluny Brown	Special effects artist	
1946	Sentimental Journey	Special effects artist	
1946	Smoky	Special effects artist	
1946	Somewhere in the Night	Special effects artist	
1946	Strange Triangle	Special effects artist	
1946	Three Little Girls in Blue	Special effects artist	
1947	The Shocking Miss Pilgrim	Special effects artist	
1948	Deep Waters	Special effects artist	Nominated for an Academy Award
