= Billy Mahan =

American actor

- Born: July 9, 1930
- Died: August 30, 2002 (aged 72)
- Occupation: Actor

Billy Mahan (July 9, 1930 – August 30, 2002) was an American film actor. A child actor, he played the recurring role of Bobby Jones in Twentieth Century Fox's Jones Family series of films. His son is voice actor Kerrigan Mahan.

== Selected filmography ==
- Every Saturday Night (1936)
- Educating Father (1936)
- Back to Nature (1936)
- The Jones Family in Big Business (1937)
- Hot Water (1937)
- Borrowing Trouble (1937)
- A Trip to Paris (1938)
- Quick Millions (1939)
- Young as You Feel (1940)

== Bibliography ==
- Drew, Bernard A. Motion Picture Series and Sequels: A Reference Guide. Routledge, 2013.
- Holmstrom, John. The Moving Picture Boy: An International Encyclopaedia from 1895 to 1995, Norwich, Michael Russell, 1996, p. 169.
