= Spring Byington =

American actress (1886–1971)

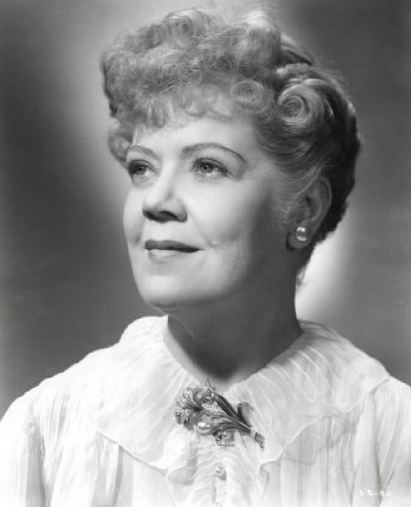
- Born: Spring Dell Byington; October 17, 1886; Colorado Springs, Colorado, U.S.
- Died: September 7, 1971 (aged 84); Los Angeles, California, U.S.
- Occupation: Actress
- Years active: 1904–1968
- Known for: You Can't Take It with You; December Bride; Little Women; Mutiny on the Bounty; Jezebel; In the Good Old Summertime
- Spouse: Roy Carey Chandler (m. 1909; div. 1920)
- Children: 2

Spring Dell Byington (October 17, 1886 – September 7, 1971) was an American actress. Her career included a seven-year run on radio and television as the star of December Bride. She was an MGM contract player who appeared in films from the 1930s to the 1960s.

Byington received a nomination for an Academy Award for Best Supporting Actress for her role as Penelope Sycamore in You Can't Take It with You (1938).

== Early life ==
Byington was born in Colorado Springs, Colorado, the daughter of Edwin Lee Byington, an educator and superintendent of schools in Colorado, and his wife Helene Maud (Cleghorn) Byington, later a physician. She had a younger sister, Helene Kimball Byington. Her father died in 1891, and her mother sent her younger daughter to live with her grandparents in Port Hope, Ontario, while Spring remained with relatives in Denver. Helene Maud Byington moved to Boston and enrolled in the Boston University School of Medicine, where she graduated in 1896. She then returned to Denver and opened a practice with her classmate, Dr. Mary Ford.

Byington performed occasionally in amateur shows as a student, graduating from North High School in 1904. She soon became a professional actress with the Elitch Garden Stock Company. When their mother died in 1907, Spring and Helene were legally adopted by their aunt Margaret Eddy. Byington stated in a 1949 interview that she briefly tried newspaper reporting. Since she was already of legal age, though, she decided to start her acting career in New York City, saying that she enjoyed it, and, "I can't do anything else very well."

== Career ==
=== Stage ===
In 1903, Byington joined a repertory company, Belasco De Mille Company of New York City, that was touring Buenos Aires, Argentina. Among the plays that she performed in Buenos Aires was Dr. Morris, written by Dr. Alberto del Solar. Between 1903 and 1916, the company performed American plays, translated into Spanish and Portuguese in Argentina and Brazil. Upon returning to New York City, Byington divided her time between working in Manhattan and staying with her daughters. Her daughters were living with friends J. Allen and Lois Babcock, in Leonardsville, New York, who were taking care of them while Byington worked in the city. She began touring in 1919 with a production of The Bird of Paradise, which brought the Hawaiian culture to the mainland, and in 1921 began work with the Stuart Walker Company, for which she played roles in Mr. Pim Passes By, The Ruined Lady, and Rollo's Wild Oat, among others. This connection landed her a role in her first Broadway performance in 1924, George S. Kaufman and Marc Connelly's Beggar on Horseback, which ran for six months. She renewed the role in March and April 1925 and continued on Broadway with an additional 18 productions from 1925 to 1935. These included roles in Kaufman and Moss Hart's Once in a Lifetime, Rachel Crothers's When Ladies Meet (which had 173 performances on Broadway during the 1932-33 winter season, with Spring Byington playing the role of Bridget Drake), and Dawn Powell's Jig Saw.

=== Films, radio, and television ===
In her last years on Broadway, Byington began work in films. The first was a short film titled Papa's Slay Ride (1930), performing the role of Mama, and the second role, and better known, was in Little Women (1933) as Marmee, with Katharine Hepburn as her daughter Jo. For MGM, she played Midshipman Roger Byam's (Franchot Tone) mother in Mutiny on the Bounty (1935). She became a household name during The Jones Family series of films, and continued as a character actress in Hollywood for several years. Byington was nominated for the Academy Award for Best Supporting Actress for You Can't Take it with You (1938), which was won by Fay Bainter for Jezebel (in which Byington also had a role as an antebellum society matron, Mrs. Kendrick).. In 1941, she played Mrs. Mitchell, mother to Barbara Stanwyck's star character, in Meet John Doe.

During World War II, Byington worked in radio, and decided to continue working in this medium, as her film career began to decline after the war.

In 1951, she appeared in Food for Thought, a 22-minute color film sponsored by Pressure Cooking Institute.

In 1952, she joined CBS Radio to become the lead role of the widowed Lily Ruskin, in the sitcom December Bride. In 1954, television company Desilu Productions produced a pilot of the show for a sitcom, also starring Byington. The pilot was successful, and the new hit sitcom aired in its first two seasons immediately following I Love Lucy. December Bride broadcast 156 episodes through 1959.

Byington appeared with Tab Hunter in a 1960 episode of The Tab Hunter Show. She also guest-starred as herself in the CBS sitcom Dennis the Menace, starring Jay North, in the episode titled "Dennis' Birthday" (1961), with character actor Vaughn Taylor also appearing in the segment.

From 1961 to 1963, Byington was cast as the wise, matronly housekeeper, Daisy Cooper, in the NBC Western series Laramie, starring John Smith and Robert Fuller. On Laramie, Daisy serves as a surrogate grandmother to orphaned Mike Williams, played by the child actor Dennis Holmes.

After Laramie, Byington guest-starred in "Oh, Those Hats!", a 1963 episode of Mister Ed, playing Karen Dooley, an influential Beverly Hills columnist. She later appeared as Mrs. Jolly on Dennis Weaver's NBC comedy drama Kentucky Jones, and as wealthy J. Pauline Spaghetti in two episodes of Batman in 1966. Her penultimate role before her death from cancer was in 1967, as Larry Hagman's mother on NBC's I Dream of Jeannie. Her final role was in 1968 as Mother General on ABC's The Flying Nun, starring Sally Field.

== Personal life ==
Byington spoke some Spanish, which she learned during the time spent with her husband in Buenos Aires, and she studied Brazilian Portuguese in her later years. In July 1958, she confided to reporter Hazel Johnson that she had acquired a "small coffee plantation" in Brazil the month before and was learning Portuguese. "Miss Byington explained that she first listens to a 'conditioning record' before she goes to sleep. An hour later, her Portuguese lessons automatically begin feeding into her pillow by means of a small speaker."

Byington was fascinated by metaphysics and science-fiction novels, including George Orwell's 1984. She surprised her co-stars in December Bride with her knowledge of the Earth's satellites and the constellations in the night sky, and read The Magazine of Fantasy & Science Fiction.

In August 1955, Byington began taking flying lessons in Glendale, California, but the studio made her stop because of insurance problems.

In January 1957, she testified in the trial of the Sica brothers as a character witness on behalf of DaLonne Cooper, who was a "part-time script girl" for December Bride.

=== Marriage and engagement ===
In 1909, Byington married Roy Chandler, the manager of the theater troupe with which she worked in Buenos Aires. They remained there until 1916, when Spring returned to New York City to give birth to her first daughter, Phyllis Helene. Her second daughter, Lois Irene, was born in 1917. The couple divorced about 1920. Between then and the mid-1930s, she devoted her time to developing her career.

In the late 1930s, Byington was engaged to be married to an Argentine industrialist. Following an engagement of a few years and several months, he died unexpectedly. She then devoted her life to her career and family.

A number of Hollywood historians have claimed that Byington was a lesbian. Actress Marjorie Main's biographer Michelle Vogel has noted that Main and Byington were reported widely as having had a long-term relationship. When asked about Byington's sexual orientation, Main observed: "It's true, she didn't have much use for men."

== Death ==
On September 7, 1971, Byington died of cancer at her home in the Hollywood Hills. At her request, her body was donated to medical research.

For her contributions to the film and television industries, Byington has two stars on the Hollywood Walk of Fame, as a motion-picture star at 6507 Hollywood Boulevard, and as a television star at 6231 Hollywood Boulevard.

== Broadway credits ==
- Beggar on Horseback (1924, 1925 revival) – Mrs. Cady
- Weak Sisters (1925)
- Puppy Love (1926)
- The Great Adventure (1926–1927)
- Skin Deep (1927)
- The Merchant of Venice (1928)
- To-Night at 12 (1928–1929)
- Be Your Age (1929)
- Jonesy (1929)
- Ladies Don't Lie (1929)
- I Want My Wife (1930)
- Once in a Lifetime (1930) – Helen Hobart
- Ladies of Creation (1931)
- We Are No Longer Children (1932)
- When Ladies Meet (1932–1933)
- The First Apple (1933–1934)
- No Questions Asked (1934)
- Jig Saw (1934)
- Piper Paid (1934–1935)

== Partial filmography ==
=== Films ===
- Little Women (1933) as Marmee March
- Werewolf of London (1935) as Miss Ettie Coombes
- Love Me Forever (1935) as Clara Fields
- Broadway Hostess (1935) as Mrs. Duncan-Griswald-Wembley-Smythe
- The Great Impersonation (1935) as Duchess Caroline
- Ah, Wilderness! (1935) as Mrs. Miller
- Mutiny on the Bounty (1935) as Mrs. Byam
- Dodsworth (1936) as Matey Pearson
- Stage Struck (1936) as Mrs. Randall
- The Charge of the Light Brigade (1936) as Lady Octavia Warrenton
- Theodora Goes Wild (1936) as Rebecca Parry
- The Girl on the Front Page (1936) as Mrs. Langford
- Palm Springs (1936) as Aunt Letty
- Penrod and Sam (1937) as Mrs. Schofield
- A Family Affair (1937) as Mrs. Hardy
- Green Light (1937) as Mrs. Dexter
- It's Love I'm After (1937) as Aunt Ella Paisley
- The Buccaneer (1938) as Dolly Madison
- The Adventures of Tom Sawyer (1938) as Widow Douglas (uncredited)
- Jezebel (1938) as Mrs. Kendrick
- You Can't Take It with You (1938) as Penelope "Penny" Sycamore
- Chicken Wagon Family (1939) as Josephine Fippany
- Quick Millions (1939) as Mrs. Jones
- The Blue Bird (1940) as Mummy Tyl
- Laddie (1940) as Mrs. Stanton
- Lucky Partners (1940) as Aunt Lucy
- My Love Came Back (1940) as Clara Malette
- The Devil and Miss Jones (1941) as Elizabeth Ellis
- Meet John Doe (1941) as Mrs. Mitchell
- When Ladies Meet (1941) as Bridget Drake
- Roxie Hart (1942) as Mary Sunshine
- Rings on Her Fingers (1942) as Mrs. Maybelle Worthington
- The Vanishing Virginian (1942) as Rosa Yancey
- The Affairs of Martha (1942) as Sophia Sommerfield
- The War Against Mrs. Hadley (1942) as Cecilia Talbot
- Heaven Can Wait (1943) as Bertha Van Cleve
- Presenting Lily Mars (1943) as Mrs. Mars
- The Heavenly Body (1944) as Nancy Porter
- I'll Be Seeing You (1944) as Mrs. Marshall
- Reward Unlimited (1944 short) as Peggy's Mother
- The Enchanted Cottage (1945) as Violet Price
- Salty O'Rourke (1945) as Mrs. Brooks
- Thrill of a Romance (1945) as Grandma Glenn
- Captain Eddie (1945) as Mrs. Frost
- Dragonwyck (1946) as Magda
- A Letter for Evie (1946) as Mrs. McPherson
- Living in a Big Way (1947) as Mrs. Minerva Alsop Morgan
- Singapore (1947) as Mrs. Bellows
- It Had to Be You (1947) as Mrs. Martha Stafford
- Cynthia (1947) as Carrie Jannings
- B.F.'s Daughter (1948) as Gladys Fulton
- In the Good Old Summertime (1949) as Nellie Burke
- The Big Wheel (1949) as Mary Coy
- The Reformer and the Redhead (1950) as Kathy's Mother (voice, uncredited)
- Please Believe Me (1950) as Mrs. Milwright
- Louisa (1950) as Louisa Norton
- The Skipper Surprised His Wife (1950) as Agnes Thorndyke
- Devil's Doorway (1950) as Mrs. Masters
- Walk Softly, Stranger (1950) as Mrs. Brentman
- According to Mrs. Hoyle (1951) as Mrs. Hoyle
- Angels in the Outfield (1951) as Sister Edwitha
- Bannerline (1951) as Mrs. Loomis
- No Room for the Groom (1952) as Mama Kingshead
- Because You're Mine (1952) as Mrs. Edna Montville
- The Rocket Man (1954) as Justice Amelia Brown
- Please Don't Eat the Daisies (1960) as Suzie Robinson

=== "Jones Family" films ===
- Every Saturday Night (1936)
- Educating Father (1936)
- Back to Nature (1936)
- Off to the Races (1937)
- The Jones Family in Big Business (1937)
- Hot Water (1937)
- Borrowing Trouble (1937)
- Love on a Budget (1938)
- A Trip to Paris (1938)
- Safety in Numbers (1938)
- Down on the Farm (1938)
- Everybody's Baby (1939)
- The Jones Family in Hollywood (1939)
- The Jones Family in Quick Millions (1939)
- Too Busy to Work (1939)
- Young as You Feel (1940)
- On Their Own (1940)
- I'll Be Seeing You (1944)

=== Television ===
- December Bride (1954–1959) (157 episodes) – Lily Ruskin
- The Ford Show, Starring Tennessee Ernie Ford (December 27, 1956) – Herself
- What's My Line? (October 27, 1957) (Season 9 Episode 9 (#386 overall)) Mystery Guest. Was one of only a few Mystery Guests who disguised her voice well enough to fool the panel.
- Alfred Hitchcock Presents (1960) (Season 6 Episode 11: "The Man with Two Faces") - Alice Wagner
- The Tab Hunter Show (1960) (Season 1 Episode 6: "The Matchmaker") – Mollie Coburn
- Dennis the Menace (1961) – Played herself on episode "Dennis' Birthday" that aired on 02/19/1961.
- Laramie (1961–1963) (59 episodes) – Daisy Cooper / Aunt Daisy Cooper
- Mister Ed (1963) (Season 4 Episode 8: "Oh, Those Hats!") - Karen Dooley
- The Greatest Show on Earth (1964) (Season 1 Episode 28: "The Train Don't Stop Till It Gets There") - Louise
- Kentucky Jones (1965) (Season 1 Episode 22: "Feminine Intrusion") – Mrs. Jolly
- Batman (1966) – J. Pauline Spaghetti
  - (Season 2 Episode 33: "The Sandman Cometh")
  - (Season 2 Episode 34: "The Catwoman Goeth")
- I Dream of Jeannie (1967) (Season 3 Episode 9: "Meet My Master's Mother") – Mother
- The Flying Nun (1968) (Season 2 Episode 11: "To Fly or Not to Fly") – Mother General

== Awards ==
=== Nominations ===
- 1933 Alexandrias: Best Supporting Actress, Little Women
  - Won by Mary Astor, The World Changes
- 1938 Oscars: Best Supporting Actress, You Can't Take It with You
  - Won by Fay Bainter, Jezebel
- 1950 Golden Globes: Best Actress – Comedy or Musical, Louisa
  - Won by Judy Holliday, Born Yesterday
- 1957 Emmys: Best Actress – Drama or Comedy Series, December Bride
  - Won by Jane Wyatt, Father Knows Best
- 1958 Emmys: Best Actress – Drama or Comedy Series, December Bride
  - Won by Jane Wyatt, Father Knows Best

== See also ==
- List of actors with Academy Award nominations
