= June Carlson =

American actress (1924–1996)

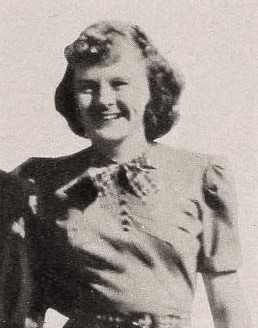
- Born: April 16, 1924; Los Angeles, California, United States
- Died: December 9, 1996 (aged 72); San Clemente, California, United States
- Occupation: Actress
- Years active: 1936–1948 (film)

June Carlson (April 16, 1924 – December 9, 1996) was an American film actress.

== Early years ==
A native of Los Angeles, Carlson was the daughter of Hjalmas Carlson and Carrie Rogers Carlson.

== Film ==
Carlson began her career as a child actress, appearing in the role of Lucy Jones in Twentieth Century Fox's Jones Family series of films. Once she was older, she appeared in two exploitation films Delinquent Daughters and Mom and Dad. Her final film was the 1948 western The Hawk of Powder River. She then married and retired from acting.

== Personal life ==
On June 2, 1945, Carlson married Donald C. McKean, a movie producer. She "left Hollywood ... to raise her three children and later worked in a department store cosmetics section."

== Death ==
Carlson died of an aneurysm in San Clemente, California, December 9, 1996.

== Selected filmography ==
- Every Saturday Night (1936)
- Educating Father (1936)
- Back to Nature (1936)
- Checkers (1937)
- The Jones Family in Big Business (1937)
- Hot Water (1937)
- A Trip to Paris (1938)
- Quick Millions (1939)
- Delinquent Daughters (1944)
- Mom and Dad (1945)
- Come Out Fighting (1945)
- The Hawk of Powder River (1948)
