= Samuel Kaylin =

American composer born 1892

- Born: Shevach Kalinowski; 18 Jan 1892; Ekaterinoslav, Russian Empire (now Dnipro, Ukraine)
- Died: 7 Jul 1983 (aged 91); Bakersfield, California
- Other name: Shevach Samuel Kalinowsky
- Occupations: Music Director, Fox Film, 20th Century Fox
- Known for: film music
- Spouses: Augusta Kaylin; Florence Kaylin; Clara Szemere (divorced 1972); Claire Dennis (married 1972)

Samuel Kaylin (18 January 1892 – 7 July 1983) was a film composer who scored Charlie Chan and Mr. Moto movies for Fox Film and 20th Century Fox.

== Early years ==
Kaylin was born in Ukraine and emigrated to the United States on January 16, 1907 aboard the Norddeutscher Lloyd steamship Neckar He worked as a musician at the Chinese Theater in Los Angeles.

== Hollywood ==
Kaylin joined Fox Film in 1930 and composed more than 80 film scores. Among them were the scores for Shirley Temple's Bright Eyes and John Ford's Judge Priest. He left 20th Century Fox, Fox Film's successor, in 1940. In 1943 he founded The Professional Institute of Music and Drama to educate film students and scored The Leather Burners.

== Death ==
Kaylin died in Bakersfield, California.

== Selected filmography ==
- Harmony at Home (1930)
- Walls of Gold (1933)
- Forbidden Melody (1933)
- Orient Express (1934)
- Nothing More Than a Woman (1934)
- Las fronteras del amor (1934)
- La cruz y la espada (1934)
- The Great Hotel Murder (1935)
- Gentle Julia (1936)
- The Jones Family in Big Business (1937)
- Mysterious Mr. Moto (1938)
- Mr. Moto in Danger Island (1939)
- The Man Who Wouldn't Talk (1940)
