= Mickey Rooney filmography =

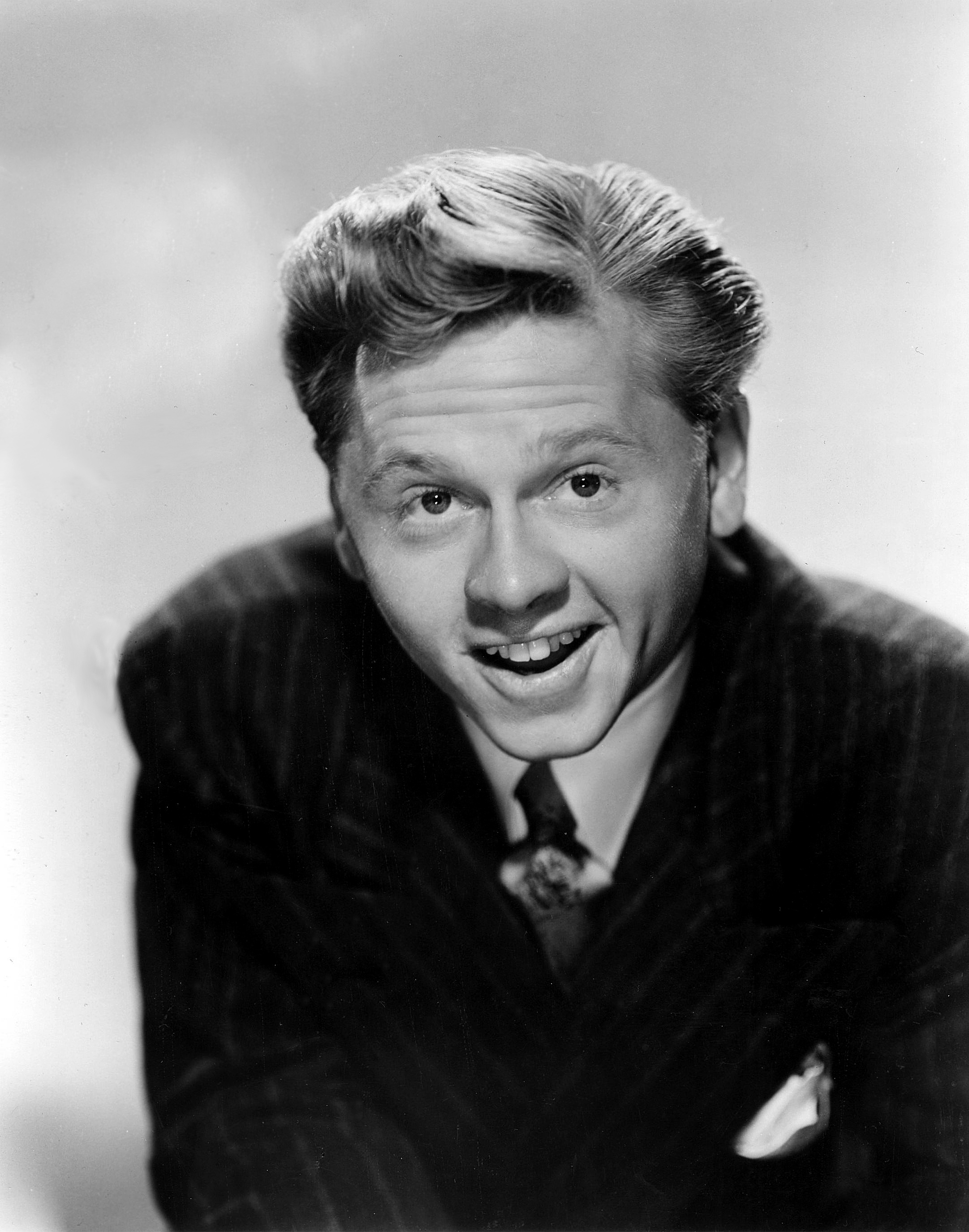
Mickey Rooney in 1940

Mickey Rooney (1920–2014) was an American actor of stage, film, television, Broadway, radio, and vaudeville. Beginning as a child actor, his career extended over 88 years, making him one of the most enduring performers in show business history. He appeared in more than 300 films and was one of the last surviving stars of the silent film era, having one of the longest careers in the medium's history.

== Film ==
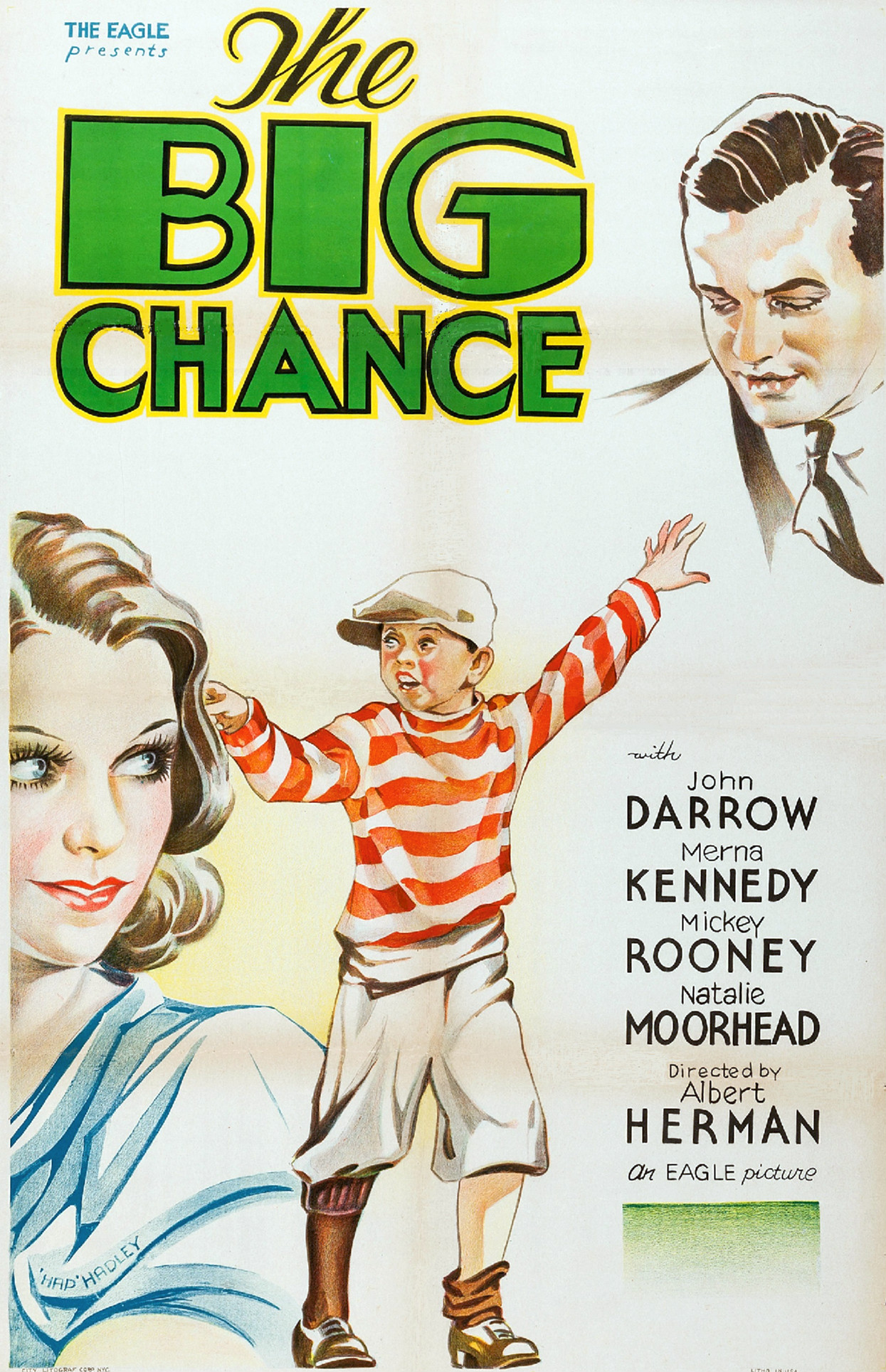
Poster for The Big Chance (1933)

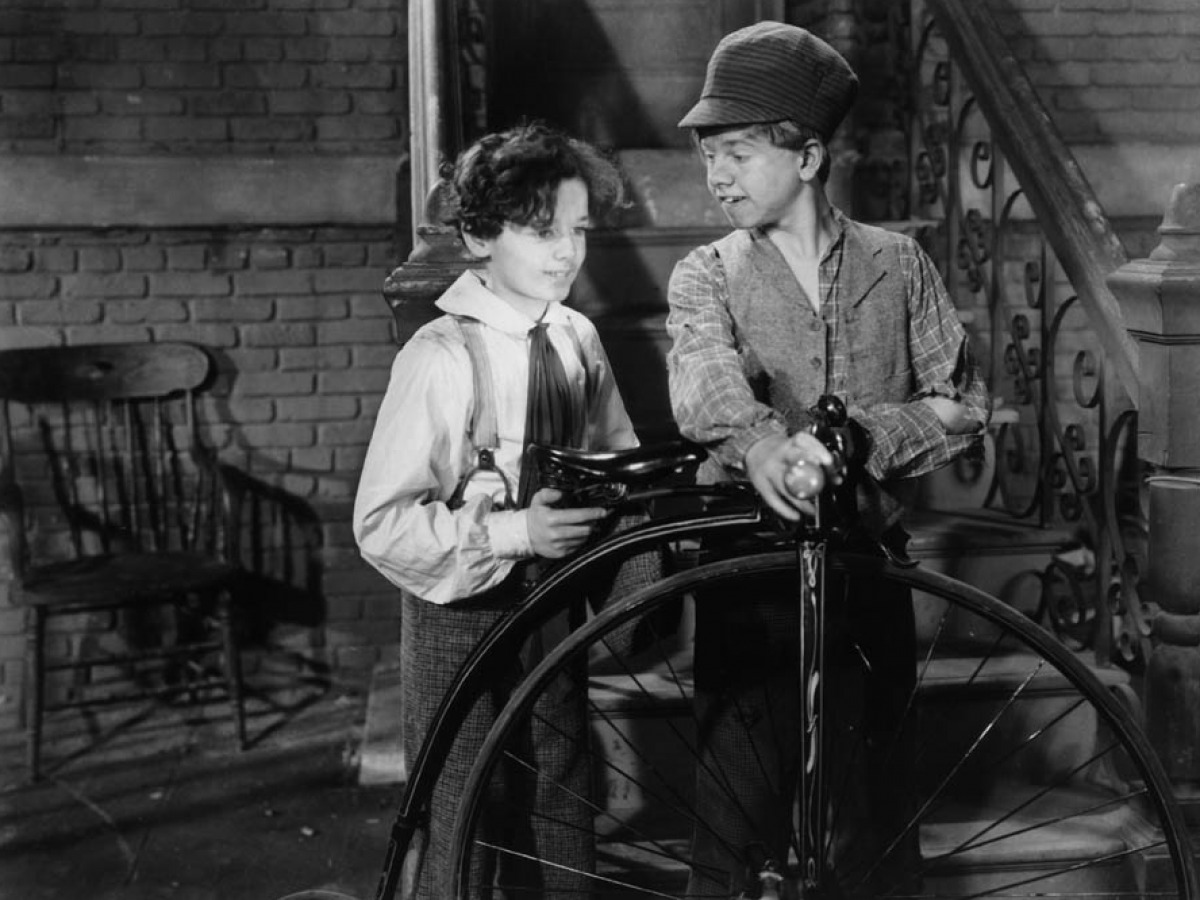
Freddie Bartholomew and Mickey Rooney in Little Lord Fauntleroy (1936)

Poster for The Devil Is a Sissy (1936)

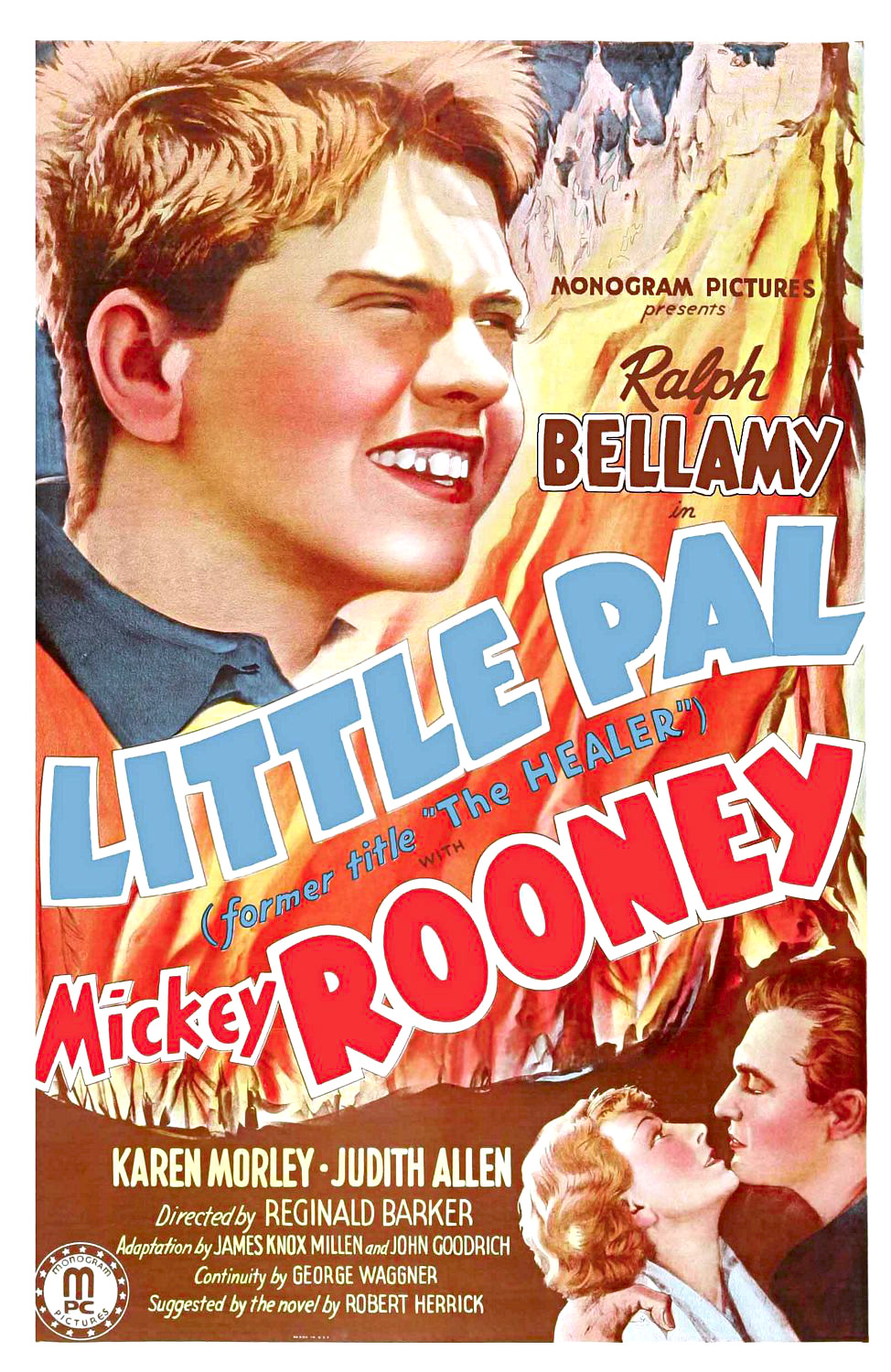
Poster for the reissue of The Healer (1935), retitled Little Pal, with Mickey Rooney featured to capitalize on his film stardom

Year	Title	Role	Notes
1927	Orchids and Ermine	Mickey McGuire	
1928	Mickey the Detective	Mickey McGuire	R.K.O. silent short October 1928
1932	The Beast of the City	Mickey Fitzpatrick	Uncredited
1932	Sin's Pay Day	"Chubby" Dennis	
1932	High Speed	Buddy Whipple	Uncredited
1932	Fast Companions	Midge	
1932	My Pal, the King	King Charles V	
1932	Officer Thirteen	Buddy Malone	
1933	The Big Cage	Jimmy O'Hara	
1933	The Life of Jimmy Dolan	"Freckles"	Uncredited, Alternate title: The Kid's Last Fight
1933	The Big Chance	Arthur Wilson	
1933	Broadway to Hollywood	Ted Hackett III as a Child	
1933	The Chief	Willie	
1933	The World Changes	Otto Peterson, as a Child	
1934	Beloved	Tommy	
1934	The Lost Jungle	Mickey	Serial, [Ch.1]
1934	I Like It That Way	Messenger Boy	
1934	Upperworld	Jerry	(scenes deleted)
1934	Manhattan Melodrama	"Blackie" as a Boy	
1934	Love Birds	Gladwyn Tootle	
1934	Half a Sinner	Willie Clark	
1934	Blind Date	Freddie	
1934	Hide-Out	Willie Miller	
1934	Chained	Boy Shipboard Swimmer	Uncredited
1934	Death on the Diamond	Mickey	
1935	The County Chairman	"Freckles"	
1935	West Point of the Air		(scenes deleted)
1935	Reckless	Eddie	Alternate titles: Born Reckless and Hard to Handle
1935	The Healer	Jimmy	Alternate title: Little Pal
1935	A Midsummer Night's Dream	Puck or Robin Goodfellow, a Fairy	
1935	Rendezvous	Country Boy	Uncredited
1935	Ah, Wilderness!	Tommy	
1936	Riffraff	Jimmy	
1936	Little Lord Fauntleroy	Dick	
1936	Down the Stretch	"Snapper" Sinclair	
1936	The Devil Is a Sissy	James "Gig" Stevens	
1937	A Family Affair	Andy Hardy	
1937	Captains Courageous	Dan Troop	
1937	Slave Ship	"Swifty"	
1937	Hoosier Schoolboy	"Shockey" Carter	
1937	Live, Love and Learn	Jerry Crump	
1937	Thoroughbreds Don't Cry	Timmie Donovan	
1937	You're Only Young Once	Andy Hardy	
1938	Love Is a Headache	Mike O'Toole	
1938	Judge Hardy's Children	Andy Hardy	
1938	Hold That Kiss	Chick Evans	
1938	Lord Jeff	Terry O'Mulvaney	
1938	Love Finds Andy Hardy	Andy Hardy	
1938	Boys Town	"Whitey" Marsh	
1938	Stablemates	Mickey	
1938	Out West with the Hardys	Andy Hardy	
1939	The Adventures of Huckleberry Finn	Huckleberry Finn	
1939	The Hardys Ride High	Andy Hardy	
1939	Andy Hardy Gets Spring Fever	Andy Hardy	
1939	Babes in Arms	Mickey Moran	At age of only 19 years old, Mickey Rooney became the second-youngest Academy Award Best Actor nominee.
1939	Judge Hardy and Son	Andy Hardy	
1940	Young Tom Edison	Thomas Edison	
1940	Andy Hardy Meets Debutante	Andy Hardy	
1940	Strike Up the Band	Jimmy Connors	
1941	Andy Hardy's Private Secretary	Andy Hardy	
1941	Men of Boys Town	"Whitey" Marsh	
1941	Life Begins for Andy Hardy	Andy Hardy	
1941	Babes on Broadway	Tommy Williams	
1942	The Courtship of Andy Hardy	Andy Hardy	
1942	A Yank at Eton	Timothy Dennis	
1942	Andy Hardy's Double Life	Andy Hardy	
1943	The Human Comedy	Homer MacAuley	At age of 23, Rooney became the third-youngest Academy Award Best Actor nominee before he was surpassed by 22-year old Timothée Chalamet in Call Me by Your Name, 74 years later.
1943	Thousands Cheer	Emcee At The Show	
1943	Girl Crazy	Danny Churchill Jr.	
1944	Andy Hardy's Blonde Trouble	Andy Hardy	
1945	National Velvet	Michael "Mi" Taylor	
1946	Love Laughs at Andy Hardy	Andy Hardy	
1947	Killer McCoy	Tommy "Killer" McCoy	
1948	Summer Holiday	Richard Miller	
1948	Words and Music	Lorenz Hart	
1949	The Big Wheel	Billy Coy	
1950	Quicksand	Dan	
1950	The Fireball	Johnny Casar	
1950	He's a Cockeyed Wonder	Freddie Frisby	
1951	My Outlaw Brother	J. Dennis "Denny" O'Moore	
1951	The Strip	Stanley Maxton	
1952	Sound Off	Mike Donnelly	
1953	Off Limits	Herbert Tuttle	
1953	All Ashore	Francis "Moby" Dickerson	
1953	A Slight Case of Larceny	Augustus "Geechy" Cheevers	
1954	Drive a Crooked Road	Eddie Shannon	
1954	The Atomic Kid	Barnaby "Blix" Waterberry	
1955	The Bridges at Toko-Ri	Mike Forney	
1955	The Twinkle in God's Eye	Reverend William Macklin II	
1956	The Bold and the Brave	Willie Dooley	Nomination for an Academy Award for Best Supporting Actor in 1956.
1956	Francis in the Haunted House	David Prescott	
1956	Magnificent Roughnecks	Frank Sommers	
1957	Operation Mad Ball	Master Sergeant Yancy Skibo	
1957	Baby Face Nelson	Lester M. "Baby Face Nelson" Gillis	
1958	A Nice Little Bank That Should Be Robbed	Gustav "Gus" Harris	
1958	Andy Hardy Comes Home	Andy Hardy	
1959	The Last Mile	"Killer" Mears	
1959	The Big Operator	Joe "Little Joe" Braun	Alternate title: Anatomy of the Syndicate
1960	The Private Lives of Adam and Eve	Nick Lewis / The Devil	
1960	Platinum High School	Steven Conway	
1961	The Big Bankroll	Johnny Burke	Alternate title: King of the Roaring 20s: The Story of Arnold Rothstein
1961	Breakfast at Tiffany's	I.Y. Yunioshi	
1961	Everything's Ducky	Kermit "Beetle" McKay	
1962	Requiem for a Heavyweight	Army	
1962	Follow that Dream		
1963	It's a Mad, Mad, Mad, Mad World	"Dingy" Bell	
1964	The Secret Invasion	Terence Scanlon	
1965	Twenty-Four Hours to Kill	Norman Jones	
1965	How to Stuff a Wild Bikini	"Peachy" Keane	
1966	Ambush Bay	Sergeant Ernest Wartell	
1966	The Devil in Love	Adramalek	
1968	Skidoo	George "Blue Chips" Packard	
1969	The Extraordinary Seaman	Cook #3 / C W. J. Oglethorpe	
1969	The Comic	Martin "Cockeye" Van Buren	
1969	80 Steps to Jonah	Wilfred Bashford	
1970	The Cockeyed Cowboys of Calico County	Tom "Indian Tom"	
1970	Santa Claus Is Comin' to Town	Kris Kringle / Santa Claus	Voice, TV movie
1971	Mooch Goes to Hollywood	Himself	
1971	The Manipulator	B.J. Lang	
1972	Evil Roy Slade	Nelson Stool	TV movie
1972	Richard	Guardian Angel	
1972	Pulp	Preston Gilbert	
1973	The Godmothers	Rocky Mastrasso	
1974	Thunder County	Gas Station Attendant	
1974	Journey Back to Oz	Scarecrow	Voice
1974	The Year Without a Santa Claus	Santa Claus	Voice
1975	Ace of Hearts	Papa Joe	
1975	From Hong Kong with Love	Marty	Alternate title: Bons Baisers de Hong Kong
1975	The Intruder	Captain Jennings	
1975	Rachel's Man	Laban	
1976	Find the Lady	"Trigger"	
1977	The Domino Principle	Spiventa	
1977	Pete's Dragon	Lampie	
1978	The Magic of Lassie	Gus	
1979	Arabian Adventure	Daad El-Shur	
1979	The Black Stallion	Henry Dailey	Nominated for an Academy Award for Best Supporting Actor in 1979.
1979	Rudolph and Frosty's Christmas in July	Santa Claus	Voice, TV movie
1981	The Fox and the Hound	Tod	Voice
1981	Bill	Bill Sackter	TV movie
1982	Odyssey of the Pacific	The Railway Engineer	Alternate titles: The Emperor of Peru and Treasure Train
1983	Bill: On His Own	Bill Sackter	TV movie
1984	It Came Upon the Midnight Clear	Mike Halligan	TV movie
1985	The Care Bears Movie	Mr. Cherrywood	Voice
1986	Lightning, the White Stallion	Barney Ingram	
1986	Little Spies	Jimmie "The Hermit"	
1988	Bluegrass	John Paul Jones	
1989	Little Nemo: Adventures in Slumberland	Flip	Voice
1989	Erik the Viking	Erik's Grandfather	
1990	Home For Christmas	Elmer	TV movie
1991	My Heroes Have Always Been Cowboys	Junion	
1991	The Gambler Returns: The Luck of the Draw	The Director	TV movie
1991	Silent Night, Deadly Night 5: The Toy Maker	Joe Petto	Direct-to-video
1992	The Magic Voyage	The Narrator	Voice
1992	Maximum Force	Chief of Police	
1992	The Legend of Wolf Mountain	Pat Jensen	
1992	Sweet Justice	Zeke	
1993	The Milky Life	Barry Reilly	
1994	Revenge of the Red Baron	Grandpa Spencer	
1994	Making Waves	Gabriel	
1995	Outlaws: The Legend of O.B. Taggart	O.B. Taggart	
1997	The Face on the Barroom Floor		Short film
1998	Animals	Tollkeeper	
1998	Michael Kael vs. the World News Company	Griffith	
1998	Sinbad: The Battle of the Dark Knights	Sage	
1998	Internet Love	Mickey Rooney	
1998	Killing Midnight	Professor Mort Sang	
1998	Babe: Pig in the City	Fugly Floom	
1998	The First of May	Ed "Boss Ed"	
1999	Illusion Infinity, aka Paradise	Simon / Henry Sr.	Dual role
2000	Phantom of the Megaplex	Mason "Movie Mason"	TV movie
2001	Lady and the Tramp II: Scamp's Adventure	Sparkey	Voice, Direct-to-video
2002	Topa Topa Bluffs	The Prospector	
2004	To Kill a Mockumentary	Max	
2004	Holy Hollywood	Grandpa	
2005	The Last Confederate: The Story of Robert Adams	David McCord	
2005	The Happy Elf	Santa	Voice
2006	Night at the Museum	Gus	
2006	The Thirsting	Savy	
2007	A Christmas Too Many	Grandpa	Direct-to-video
2007	The Yesterday Pool	Trobadar	Short
2007	Bamboo Shark	Brooks	TV movie
2008	Lost Stallions: The Journey Home	Chief	
2008	A Miser Brothers' Christmas	Santa Claus	Voice, TV movie
2008	Empire State Building Murders	Paulie Genovese	
2009	Saddle Up with Dick Wrangler & Injun Joe	Owen Blumenkrantz	
2009	Night at the Museum: Battle of the Smithsonian	Gus	Deleted scene only
2010	Now Here	"Swifty"	
2010	Gerald	The Doctor	
2011	Night Club	Jerry Sherman	
2011	The Muppets	Elderly Smalltown Resident	
2011	Bamboo Shark	Brooks	
2012	Last Will and Embezzlement	Himself	
2012	The Voices from Beyond	Johnny O'Hara	
2012	The Woods	Lester	
2012	Driving Me Crazy	Mr. Cohen	
2014	Night at the Museum: Secret of the Tomb	Gus	Released posthumously
2017	Dr. Jekyll and Mr. Hyde	Mr. Louis	Released posthumously
2021	Holy Hollywood	Grandpa	Released posthumously (final film role)

== Stage ==
- 1935: A Midsummer Night's Dream
- 1951: Sailor Beware
- 1963: The Tunnel of Love
- 1965: A Funny Thing Happened on the Way to the Forum
- 1967: The Odd Couple
- 1969–70: George M!
- 1971: Three Goats and a Blanket
- 1971: Hide and Seek
- 1971: W.C. (closed on the road)
- 1972: Pulp
- 1972–74: See How They Run
- 1973: A Midsummer Night's Dream
- 1975: Goodnight Ladies
- 1975: Sugar
- 1976: Alimony
- 1979–82, 1983–88: Sugar Babies
- 1983: Show Boat
- 1986: The Laugh's On Me
- 1987: A Funny Thing Happened on the Way to the Forum
- 1989: Two for the Show
- 1990: The Sunshine Boys
- 1991–93: The Will Rogers Follies
- 1993: Lend Me a Tenor
- 1994: The Mind with the Naughty Man
- 1995: Crazy for You
- 1997–99: The Wizard of Oz
- 2000: Hollywood Goes Classical
- 2003: Singular Sensations
- 2000–11: Let's Put On A Show

== Short subjects ==
Year	Title	Role	Notes
1926	Not to Be Trusted	The Nephew	
1927	Mickey's Circus	Mickey McGuire	
1927	Mickey's Pals	Mickey McGuire	
1927	Mickey's Eleven	Mickey McGuire	
1927	Mickey's Battles	Mickey McGuire	
1928	Mickey's Parade	Mickey McGuire	
1928	Mickey in School	Mickey McGuire	
1928	Mickey's Nine	Mickey McGuire	
1928	Mickey's Little Eva	Mickey McGuire	
1928	Mickey's Wild West	Mickey McGuire	
1928	Mickey in Love	Mickey McGuire	
1928	Mickey's Triumph	Mickey McGuire	
1928	Mickey's Babies	Mickey McGuire	
1928	Mickey's Movies	Mickey McGuire	
1928	Mickey's Rivals	Mickey McGuire	
1928	Mickey the Detective	Mickey McGuire	
1928	Mickey's Athletes	Mickey McGuire	
1928	Mickey's Big Game Hunt	Mickey McGuire	
1929	Mickey's Great Idea	Mickey McGuire	
1929	Mickey's Menagerie	Mickey McGuire	
1929	Mickey's Last Chance	Mickey McGuire	
1929	Mickey's Brown Derby	Mickey McGuire	
1929	Mickey's Northwest Mounted	Mickey McGuire	
1929	Mickey's Initiation	Mickey McGuire	
1929	Mickey's Midnite Follies	Mickey McGuire	
1929	Mickey's Surprise	Mickey McGuire	
1929	Mickey's Mix-Up	Mickey McGuire	
1929	Mickey's Big Moment	Mickey McGuire	
1929	Mickey's Strategy	Mickey McGuire	
1930	Mickey's Champs	Mickey McGuire	
1930	Mickey's Explorers	Mickey McGuire	
1930	Mickey's Master Mind	Mickey McGuire	
1930	Mickey's Luck	Mickey McGuire	
1930	Mickey's Whirlwinds	Mickey McGuire	
1930	Mickey's Warriors	Mickey McGuire	
1930	Mickey the Romeo	Mickey McGuire	
1930	Mickey's Merry Men	Mickey McGuire	
1930	Mickey's Winners	Mickey McGuire	
1930	Screen Snapshots Series 9, No. 24	Mickey McGuire	
1930	Mickey's Musketeers	Mickey McGuire	
1930	Mickey's Bargain	Mickey McGuire	
1931	Mickey's Stampede	Mickey McGuire	
1931	Mickey's Crusaders	Mickey McGuire	
1931	Mickey's Rebellion	Mickey McGuire	
1931	Mickey's Diplomacy	Mickey McGuire	
1931	Mickey's Wildcats	Mickey McGuire	
1931	Mickey's Thrill Hunters	Mickey McGuire	
1931	The Hare Mail	Oswald the Lucky Rabbit	Voice role
1931	The Fisherman	Oswald the Lucky Rabbit	Voice role
1931	Mickey's Helping Hand	Mickey McGuire	
1931	Mickey's Sideline	Mickey McGuire	
1932	Mickey's Busy Day	Mickey McGuire	
1932	Mickey's Travels	Mickey McGuire	
1932	Mickey's Holiday	Mickey McGuire	
1932	Mickey's Big Business	Mickey McGuire	
1932	Mickey's Golden Rule	Mickey McGuire	
1932	Mickey's Charity	Mickey McGuire	
1933	Mickey's Ape Man	Mickey McGuire	
1933	Mickey's Race	Mickey McGuire	
1933	Mickey's Big Broadcast	Mickey McGuire	
1933	Mickey's Disguises	Mickey McGuire	
1933	Mickey's Touchdown	Mickey McGuire	
1933	Mickey's Tent Show	Mickey McGuire	
1933	Mickey's Covered Wagon	Mickey McGuire	
1934	Mickey's Minstrels	Mickey McGuire	
1934	Mickey's Rescue	Mickey McGuire	
1934	Mickey's Medicine Man	Mickey McGuire	
1935	Pirate Party on Catalina Isle	Himself	
1940	Andy Hardy's Dilemma	Andy Hardy	
1940	Rodeo Dough	Himself	
1941	Meet the Stars #4: Variety Reel #2	Himself	
1943	Show Business at War	Himself	
1947	Screen Snapshots: Out of This World Series	Himself	
1953	Screen Snapshots: Mickey Rooney – Then and Now	Himself	
1958	Screen Snapshots: Glamorous Hollywood	Himself	
1968	Vienna	Kidnapper	
1974	Just One More Time	Himself	
1975	The Lion Roars Again	Himself	
2008	Wreck the Halls	Santa Claus	

== Box-office ranking ==
For a number of years, film exhibitors regularly voted Rooney as one of the top money making stars in the country in the annual Quigley Poll:

- 1938 – 4th
- 1939 – 1st, 2nd (UK)
- 1940 – 1st, 1st (UK)
- 1941 – 1st, 1st (UK)
- 1942 – 4th, 1st (UK)
- 1943 – 9th, 6th (UK)
- 1944 – 18th
- 1945 - 25th

== Television ==
Rooney made countless appearances in TV sitcoms and television films. He also lent his voice to many animation films. Only his most important work is listed in this section.

Year(s)	Title	Role	Notes
1954–1955	The Mickey Rooney Show	Mickey Mulligan	33 episodes
1957	Playhouse 90	Sammy Hogart	"The Comedian"; lead role
1959	Wagon Train	Samuel T. Evans	Episode: "The Greenhorn Story"
1960	Wagon Train	Samuel T. Evans	Episode: "Wagons Ho!"
1960	General Electric Theater	Al Roberts	Episode: "The Money Driver"
1963	The Twilight Zone	Grady	Episode: "The Last Night of a Jockey"
1964	Rawhide	Pan Macropolous	Episode: "Incident of the Odyssey"
1964	Combat	Harry White	Episode: "Silver Service"
1964–1965	Mickey	Mickey Grady	17 episodes
1972	Night Gallery	August Kolodney	Episode: "Rare Objects"
1977	A Year at the Top	Uncle Mickey Durbin	Episode: "Pilot"
1979	The Wonderful World of Disney	Old Bailey	Episodes: "Donovan's Kid: Parts 1 & 2"
1982	One of the Boys	Oliver Nugent	13 episodes
1982	The Love Boat	Angelarum Dominicus	Episode: "The Christmas Presence"
1986	The Disney Sunday Movie	James Turner	Episode: "Little Spies"
1986	Care Bears	Noble Heart Horse	Voice, 4 episodes; uncredited
1988	The Golden Girls	Rocco	Episode: "Larceny and Old Lace"
1990–1993	The Adventures of the Black Stallion	Henry Dailey	78 episodes
1993	Murder, She Wrote	Matt Cleveland	Episode: "Bloodlines"
1994	Full House	Mr. Dreghorn	Episode: "Arrest Ye Merry Gentlemen "
1995	The Simpsons	Himself	Voice, Episode: "Radioactive Man"
1996	Kung Fu: The Legend Continues	Harold Lang	Episode: "A Shaolin Treasure"
1997	Conan	Gobe	2 episodes
1997–1998	Kleo the Misfit Unicorn	Talbut	Voice, 26 episodes
1998	ER	Dr. George Bikel	Episode: "Exodus"
1998	Mike Hammer, Private Eye	Lucius	Episode: "Lucky in Love"
2003	GodRocks!	Coach Bullseye	Voice, Episode: "Splatball Square-Off"
2011	Eagleheart	Himself	Episode: "Once in a Wattle"
2015	American Dad!	Short Producer	Voice, Episode: "A Star Is Reborn"; Released posthumously

== Awards and honors ==
Year	Association	Category	Nominated work / Honor	Result
1938	Academy Awards	Academy Juvenile Award	(with Deanna Durbin) "For their significant contribution in bringing to the screen the spirit and personification of youth, and as juvenile players setting a high standard of ability and achievement."	Honored
1939	Academy Awards	Best Actor in a Leading Role	Babes in Arms	Nominated
1943	Academy Awards	Best Actor in a Leading Role	The Human Comedy	Nominated
1956	Academy Awards	Best Actor in a Supporting Role	The Bold and the Brave	Nominated
1957	Emmy Awards	Best Single Performance in a Leading or Supporting Role	"The Comedian", episode of Playhouse 90	Nominated
1957	Laurel Awards	Top Male Action Star	Baby Face Nelson	3rd Place
1958	Emmy Awards	Best Single Performance in a Leading or Supporting Role	Alcoa Theatre: Eddie	Nominated
1960	Hollywood Walk of Fame	Star of Motion Picture	Star at 1718 Vine Street	Honored
1960	Hollywood Walk of Fame	Star of Television	Star at 6372 Hollywood Boulevard	Honored
1960	Hollywood Walk of Fame	Star of Radio	Star at 6541 Hollywood Boulevard	Honored
1961	Emmy Awards	Best Single Performance in a Leading or Supporting Role	"Somebody's Waiting", episode of The Dick Powell Show	Nominated
1962	Laurel Awards	Top Male Supporting Performance	Requiem for a Heavyweight	Nominated
1964	Golden Globes	Best TV Star – Male	Mickey	Won
1980	Academy Awards	Best Actor in a Supporting Role	The Black Stallion	Nominated
1980	Tony Awards	Best Performance by a Leading Actor in a Musical	Sugar Babies	Nominated
1980	Drama Desk Awards	Outstanding Actor in a Musical	Sugar Babies	Nominated
1981	Emmy Awards	Outstanding Lead Actor in a Limited Series or a Special	Bill	Won
1981	Golden Globes	Best Actor in a TV Mini-Series or Motion Picture	Bill	Won
1983	Academy Awards	Academy Honorary Award	"In recognition of his 60 years of versatility in a variety of memorable film performances."	Honored
1983	Emmy Awards	Outstanding Lead Actor in a Limited Series or a Special	Bill: On His Own	Nominated
1991	Gemini Awards	Best Performance by an Actor in a Continuing Leading Dramatic Role	The Adventures of the Black Stallion	Nominated
1991	Young Artist Awards	Former Child Star Award	For lifetime achievement as a child star (Subsequently renamed "The Mickey Rooney Award")	Honored
1996	Giffoni Film Festival	François Truffaut Award		Honored
2004	Pocono Mountains Film Festival	Lifetime Achievement Award		Honored

=== Honors ===
In May 1956, Rooney received an honorary PhD in Fine Arts from both Fremont College and degree mill Sequoia University for his work in the entertainment field.

On February 8, 1960, Rooney was initiated into the Hollywood Walk of Fame with a star heralding his work in motion pictures, located at 1718 Vine Street, one for his television career located at 6541 Hollywood Boulevard, and a third dedicated to his work in radio, located at 6372 Hollywood Boulevard. On March 29, 1984, he received a fourth star, this one for his live performances, located at 6211 Hollywood Boulevard.

He was the subject of a This Is Your Life programme in 1988, when he was surprised by Michael Aspel while appearing in Sugar Babies (musical) at London's Savoy Theatre.

In 1996, a Golden Palm Star on the Palm Springs Walk of Stars was dedicated to Rooney.
