= Mickey's Luck =

1930 film

- Directed by: Albert Herman
- Written by: Fontaine Fox
- Produced by: Larry Darmour
- Starring: Mickey Rooney; Billy Barty; Jimmy Robinson; Delia Bogard; Marvin Stephens; Douglas Fox IV
- Distributed by: RKO Radio Pictures
- Release date: March 30, 1930
- Running time: 18 minutes
- Country: United States
- Language: English

Mickey's Luck is a 1930 short film in Larry Darmour's Mickey McGuire series starring a young Mickey Rooney. Directed by Albert Herman, the two-reel short was released to theaters on March 30, 1930, by RKO.

== Premise ==
Mickey and the Gang form their own fire department in order to partake in a parade. Later, the children attempt to rescue a pet shop from a fire.

== Cast ==
- Mickey Rooney - Mickey McGuire
- Billy Barty - Billy McGuire
- Jimmy Robinson - Hambone Johnson
- Delia Bogard - Tomboy Taylor
- Marvin Stephens - Katrink
- Douglas Fox - Stinkie Davis
- Spencer Bell - Actor rehearsing for play
