= Mickey's Disguises =

- Directed by: Jesse Duffy
- Written by: Fontaine Fox
- Produced by: Larry Darmour
- Starring: Mickey Rooney; Billy Barty; Jimmy Robinson; Delia Bogard; Marvin Stephens; Douglas Fox
- Distributed by: RKO Radio Pictures
- Release date: July 17, 1933
- Running time: 18 minutes
- Country: United States
- Language: English

Mickey's Disguises is a 1933 short film in Larry Darmour's Mickey McGuire series starring a young Mickey Rooney. Directed by Jesse Duffy, the two-reel short was released to theaters on July 17, 1933 by RKO Radio Pictures.

== Synopsis ==
After being accused of stealing chickens, Hambone’s Uncle Nemo is arrested. Believing him to be innocent, Mickey, Hambone, and their friends form a detective agency to uncover the real culprit.

Their suspicions fall on Mayor Davis’s chauffeur, and the group devises a plan to catch the thief, with Billy disguising himself in a chicken costume to lure out the real crook.

== Cast ==
- Mickey Rooney - Mickey McGuire
- Billy Barty - Billy McGuire
- Jimmy Robinson - Hambone Johnson
- Marvin Stephens - Katrink
- Delia Bogard - Tomboy Taylor
- Douglas Fox - Stinkie Davis
- Spencer Bell - The chauffeur

== Notes ==
The short marked the final appearances of Delia Bogard and Douglas Fox in the series. Following this film, Shirley Jean Rickert would replace Bogard in the role of 'Tomboy Taylor', and Douglas Scott would replace Fox in the role of 'Stinkie Davis'.
