= Mickey's Big Game Hunt =

1928 film

- Directed by: Albert Herman
- Written by: Fontaine Fox
- Produced by: Larry Darmour
- Starring: Mickey Rooney; Jimmy Robinson; Billy Barty; Delia Bogard; Marvin Stephens; Buddy Brown; Kendall McComas
- Distributed by: Film Booking Offices of America
- Release date: December 23, 1928
- Running time: 20 minutes
- Country: United States
- Languages: Silent film English intertitles

Mickey's Big Game Hunt is a 1928 silent short film in Larry Darmour's Mickey McGuire series starring a young Mickey Rooney. Directed by Albert Herman, the two-reel short was released to theaters on December 23, 1928 by FBO.

== Plot ==
Mickey and the Scorpions decide to go on a big game hunt. The kids go out into the woods, only find themselves up against real wild animals (actually escaped animals from a zoo).

== Notes ==
This is one of the few known silent shorts with Billy Barty portraying the role of 'Mickey's Kid Brudder'. He would appear throughout most of the sound era of the series as 'Billy McGuire'.

== Cast ==
- Mickey Rooney - Mickey McGuire
- Jimmy Robinson - Hambone Johnson
- Billy Barty - Mickey's Kid Brudder
- Delia Bogard - Tomboy Taylor
- Marvin Stephens - Katrink
- Buddy Brown - Stinkie Davis
- Kendall McComas - Scorpions member
