= Mickey's Movies =

1928 film

- Directed by: Earl Montgomery
- Written by: Joseph Basil (story); E.V. Durling (story); Fontaine Fox (character creator)
- Produced by: Larry Darmour
- Starring: Mickey Rooney; Jimmy Robinson; Delia Bogard; Buddy Brown; Kendall McComas; Hannah Washington
- Distributed by: Film Booking Offices of America
- Release date: September 2, 1928
- Running time: 20 minutes
- Country: United States
- Languages: Silent film English intertitles

Mickey's Movies is a 1928 silent short film in Larry Darmour's Mickey McGuire series starring a young Mickey Rooney. Directed by Albert Herman, the two-reel short was released to theaters on September 2, 1928 by FBO.

== Plot ==
Excitement arrives in the town of Toonerville, when a movie is being shot on location in front of the Scorpion's clubhouse. After kicking the film crew off of the property, Mickey and his Gang make their own movie with the aid of a 'scenario' that Mickey recently wrote.

== Notes ==
- In this film, the principal kids are aided by a new character, "Little Chocolate" (played by child actress Hannah Washington). This may have been this character's only appearance in the series. It seems likely that "Little Chocolate"'s addition to the Gang in this film had to do with the fact that Hambone (Jimmy Robinson) has a smaller part.
- In this film, it is revealed that the character of "Katrink'" is the younger brother of "The Mighty Katrinka", the latter of whom was one of the original characters from the Toonerville Trolley comics.

== Cast ==
- Mickey Rooney as Mickey McGuire
- Jimmy Robinson as Hambone Johnson
- Delia Bogard as Tomboy Taylor
- Hannah Washington as Little Chocolate
- Unknown as Katrink
- Buddy Brown as Stinky Davis
- Kendall McComas as Scorpions member
