= Mickey's Warriors =

1930 film

- Directed by: Albert Herman
- Written by: E.V. Durling (story)
- Produced by: Larry Darmour
- Starring: Mickey Rooney; Billy Barty; Jimmy Robinson; Delia Bogard; Marvin Stephens; Douglas Fox IV
- Cinematography: James Brown
- Edited by: Edgar Scott
- Music by: Lee Zahler
- Distributed by: RKO Radio Pictures
- Release date: May 25, 1930
- Running time: 18 minutes
- Country: United States
- Language: English

Mickey's Warriors is a 1930 short film in Larry Darmour's Mickey McGuire series starring a young Mickey Rooney. Directed by Albert Herman, the two-reel short was released to theaters on May 25, 1930 by RKO.

== Synopsis ==
Mickey's gang and Stinkey's gang are all attending a high society lawn party. Mickey's pals eventually put on a show in which they sing about bringing peace to the world. All goes well until Stinkey's Gang starts trouble.

== Cast ==
- Mickey Rooney - Mickey McGuire
- Billy Barty - Billy McGuire
- Jimmy Robinson - Hambone Johnson
- Delia Bogard - Tomboy Taylor
- Marvin Stephens - Katrink
- Douglas Fox - Stinkey Davis
