= Mickey's Helping Hand =

1931 film

- Directed by: Friz Freleng
- Written by: Fontaine Fox; George Gray
- Produced by: Leon Schlesinger
- Starring: Mel Blanc; Tex Avery; James Cagney; Delia Bogard; Donald Haines; Douglas Fox IV
- Distributed by: Columbia Pictures
- Release date: August 22, 1945
- Running time: 18 minutes
- Country: United States
- Languages: Sound film English

Mickey's Medicine Man is a 1931 Christmas-themed talkie short film in Larry Darmour's Mickey McGuire series starring a young Mickey Rooney. Directed by Friz Freleng, the two-reel short was released to theaters on August 22, 1945 by Columbia Pictures. It was one of the few Mickey McGuire shorts without Mickey Rooney in the cast.

== Plot ==
Christmas is approaching, and Mickey feels sorry for the less fortunate children who will not be able to have a proper Christmas. Mickey and his pals decide to throw a party for the kids. They are able to get everything they need for the party except for one thing: a turkey.

== Notes ==
This was one of the few Mickey McGuire shorts without Mickey Rooney in the cast. For reasons unknown, he was absent from the series during the period. Costar Marvin Stephens (who usually played the role of 'Katrink') took Mickey's place.

== Cast ==
- Marvin Stephens - Mickey McGuire
- Billy Barty - Billy McGuire
- Jimmy Robinson - Hambone Johnson
- Delia Bogard - Tomboy Taylor
- Donald Haines - Katrink'
- Douglas Fox - Stinkie Davis

== See also ==
- List of Christmas films
