= Mickey's Rescue =

- Directed by: J.A. Duffy; Wesley Morton (assistant director)
- Written by: Joseph Levering (story)
- Produced by: Larry Darmour
- Starring: Mickey Rooney; Billy Barty; Douglas Scott; Marvin Stephens; James Robinson; Shirley Jeane Rickert; Spencer Bell; Hattie McDaniel
- Cinematography: James S. Brown, Jr.
- Edited by: Dwight Caldwell
- Music by: Lee Zahler
- Distributed by: Post Pictures Corp.
- Release date: March 23, 1934
- Running time: 18 minutes
- Country: United States
- Language: English

Mickey's Rescue is a 1934 talkie short film in Larry Darmour's Mickey McGuire series starring a young Mickey Rooney. Directed by Jesse Duffy, the two-reel short was released to theaters on March 23, 1934, by Post Pictures Corp.

== Plot ==
In order to give Billy a proper education, a rich couple decide to adopt Billy. Feeling that something bad might happen to him, Mickey and the Scorpions trail the wealthy couple to a hotel. There, Billy finds out that life as a rich kid isn't so hot. When Mickey and the gang finally find him, Billy has accidentally gone out of window, and is hanging high above the ground. Can Mickey and Hambone save Billy?

== Cast ==
Order by credits:

- Mickey Rooney - "Mickey McGuire"
- Douglas Scott - "Stinkey Davis"
- Billy Barty - Billy McGuire ("Mickey's Little Brother")
- Marvin Stephens - "Katrink"
- James Robinson - "Hambone Johnson"
- Shirley Jeane Rickert - "Tomboy Taylor"
- Spencer Bell - Hotel Doorman (uncredited)
- Hattie McDaniel - Maid (uncredited)
- Robert McKenzie - Dental patient (uncredited)

=== cast notes ===
Last appearance of the character 'Stinkey Davis'.
