= Mickey's Medicine Man =

- Directed by: J.A. Duffy; Wesley Morton (assistant director)
- Written by: Joseph Levering (story); Fontaine Fox (comic strip characters)
- Produced by: Larry Darmour
- Starring: Mickey Rooney; Billy Barty; Marvin Stephens; James Robinson; Shirley Jean Rickert; Spencer Bell
- Cinematography: James S. Brown, Jr.
- Edited by: Dwight Caldwell
- Distributed by: Post Pictures Corp.
- Release date: May 18, 1934
- Running time: 18 minutes
- Country: United States
- Language: English

Mickey's Medicine Man is an American 1934 short film in Larry Darmour's Mickey McGuire series starring a young Mickey Rooney. Directed by Jesse Duffy, the two-reel short was released to theaters on May 18, 1934 by Post Pictures Corp. It was the last film in the Mickey McGuire series.

== Synopsis ==
After Hambone's Uncle Nemo gets in a car accident, the kids decide to take over his taxi cab service. After accidentally wrecking Nemo's taxi, the kids decide to raise money by creating medicine, and putting on a medicine show.

== Cast ==
In order by credits:

- Mickey Rooney - "Mickey McGuire"
- Billy Barty - Billy McGuire ("Mickey's Little Brother")
- Marvin Stephens - "Katrink"
- James Robinson - "Hambone Johnson"
- Shirley Jean Rickert - "Tomboy Taylor"
- Spencer Bell - Man with gout (uncredited)
- Robert McKenzie - Angry motorist (uncredited)
