= Mickey's Surprise =

1929 film

- Directed by: Albert Herman
- Written by: Fontaine Fox
- Produced by: Larry Darmour
- Starring: Mickey Rooney; Jimmy Robinson; Delia Bogard; Marvin Stephens; Kendall McComas
- Distributed by: RKO Radio Pictures
- Release date: September 15, 1929
- Running time: 18 minutes
- Country: United States
- Language: English

Mickey's Surprise is a 1929 short film in Larry Darmour's Mickey McGuire series starring a young Mickey Rooney. Directed by Albert Herman, the two-reel short was released to theaters on September 15, 1929, by RKO.

== Synopsis ==
Mickey and the kids put on a show at school.

== Cast ==
- Mickey Rooney - Mickey McGuire
- Jimmy Robinson - Hambone Johnson
- Delia Bogard - Tomboy Taylor
- Marvin Stephens - Katrink
- Kendall McComas - Stinkie Davis
- George "Sloppy" Gray - Teacher
- Fern Emmett - Lady
