= Mickey's Mix-Up =

1929 film

- Directed by: Albert Herman
- Written by: Fontaine Fox
- Produced by: Larry Darmour
- Starring: Mickey Rooney; Jimmy Robinson; Delia Bogard; Marvin Stephens; Kendall McComas
- Distributed by: RKO Radio Pictures
- Release date: October 13, 1929
- Running time: 18 minutes
- Country: United States
- Language: English

Mickey's Mix-Up is a 1929 short film in Larry Darmour's Mickey McGuire series starring a young Mickey Rooney. Directed by Albert Herman, the two-reel short was released to theaters on October 13, 1929 by RKO.

== Plot ==
After losing a court case to Mickey, Stinkie Davis has to let Mickey and the Scorpions put on a show in his mother's parlor.

== Cast ==
- Mickey Rooney - Mickey McGuire
- Jimmy Robinson - Hambone Johnson
- Delia Bogard - Tomboy Taylor
- Marvin Stephens - Katrink
- Kendall McComas - Stinkie Davis
