= Mickey's Champs =

1930 film by Albert Herman

- Directed by: Albert Herman
- Written by: Fontaine Fox; E.V. Durling (story); Frank Liddell (story)
- Produced by: Larry Darmour
- Starring: Mickey Rooney; Jimmy Robinson; Delia Bogard; Marvin Stephens; Douglas Fox IV; Billy Barty
- Distributed by: RKO Radio Pictures
- Release date: February 2, 1930
- Running time: 18 minutes
- Country: United States
- Language: English

Mickey's Champs is a 1930 short film in Larry Darmour's Mickey McGuire series starring a young Mickey Rooney. Directed by Albert Herman, the two-reel short was released to theaters on February 2, 1930 by RKO.

== Plot ==
Mickey and the Gang befriend a couple of hobos who refer to themselves as 'The Baron' and 'Earl'. The two bums are arrested after being accused of stealing two of Mayor Davis' suits (actually given to them by Stinkie Davis). Mickey believes that Mayor Davis' friend, a doctor, is the real thief. Mickey and Hambone pay the doctor a visit in order to prove that he is a fake and a crook.

== Cast ==
- Mickey Rooney - Mickey McGuire
- Jimmy Robinson - Hambone Johnson
- Delia Bogard - Tomboy Taylor
- Marvin Stephens - Katrink
- Douglas Fox - Stinkie Davis
- Billy Barty - Shorty
- Heinie Conklin
