= Mickey's Merry Men =

1930 film

- Directed by: Albert Herman
- Written by: Fontaine Fox
- Produced by: Larry Darmour
- Starring: Mickey Rooney; Billy Barty; Jimmy Robinson; Delia Bogard; Marvin Stephens; Douglas Fox
- Distributed by: RKO Radio Pictures
- Release date: July 20, 1930
- Running time: 18 minutes
- Country: United States
- Language: English

Mickey's Merry Men (reissued as Mickey's Brigade) is a 1930 short film in Larry Darmour's Mickey McGuire series starring a young Mickey Rooney. Directed by Albert Herman, the two-reel short was released to theaters on July 20, 1930 by RKO.

== Synopsis ==
Mickey and the Gang aspire to be like Christopher Columbus and explore new worlds. Mickey competes against Stinkie Davis in order to borrow Mary Ann's father's boat for the exploring. When Mickey loses, he and the Gang use their own boat. Later, the kids travel to a 'new world' (actually a small area close to home) and find themselves up against Native Americans, skeletons, and a real-live bear.

== Cast ==
- Mickey Rooney - Mickey McGuire
- Billy Barty - Billy McGuire
- Jimmy Robinson - Hambone Johnson
- Delia Bogard - Tomboy Taylor
- Marvin Stephens - Katrink
- Douglas Fox - Stinkie Davis
