= Mickey's Eleven =

1927 film

- Directed by: Albert Herman
- Written by: Joseph Basil (story); E.V. Durling (story); Fontaine Fox (character creator); Earl Montgomery (story)
- Produced by: Larry Darmour
- Starring: Mickey Rooney; Jimmy Robinson; Delia Bogard; Kendall McComas; Albert Schaefer
- Distributed by: Film Booking Offices of America
- Release date: November 7, 1927
- Running time: 20 minutes
- Country: United States
- Languages: Silent film English intertitles

Mickey's Eleven is a 1927 silent short film in Larry Darmour's Mickey McGuire series starring a young Mickey Rooney. Directed by Albert Herman, the two-reel short was released to theaters in November 1927 by FBO.

== Synopsis ==
Mickey and the Scorpions play a game of football against Stinky Davis and his team.

== Notes ==
An edited version was released to television in the 1960s, as a part of the Those Lovable Scallawags with Their Gangs series.

== Cast ==
- Mickey Rooney - Mickey McGuire
- Jimmy Robinson - Hambone Johnson
- Delia Bogard - Tomboy Taylor
- Unknown - Katrinka
- Paul Gudelj - Stinky Davis
- Kendall McComas - Scorpions member
- Albert Schaefer - Chubby scorpions member
