= Mickey the Detective =

1928 film

Mickey the Dective
- Directed by: Albert Herman
- Starring: Mickey Rooney; Jimmy Robinson; Marvin Stephens; Buddy Brown; Kendall McComas
- Distributed by: FBO
- Release date: October 28, 1928
- Running time: 20 minutes
- Country: United States
- Languages: Silent film English intertitles

Mickey the Detective is a 1928 silent short film in Larry Darmour's Mickey McGuire series starring a young Mickey Rooney. Directed by Albert Herman, the two-reel short was released to theaters in 1928 by FBO.

== Plot ==
Mickey and the Scorpions starts his own detective agency. Stinkie Davis kidnaps Mickey's Kid Brudder and hides him in a box headed for a science professor. Mickey and the gang catch up with Mickey's brother, but soon get into a fight with Stinkie and his pals. The kids use some of the Professor's bombs as ammunition; these bombs just so happen to contain chemicals similar to laughing gas, and they literally make the kids high as a kite. Stinkie finally throws a high explosive bomb, which lands in the mouth of Buster, the Scorpions' dog. The bomb is set to go off at a certain time of the day. Wanting to avoid getting blown up, the kids are forced to avoid Buster at all costs.

== Cast ==
- Mickey Rooney - Mickey McGuire
- Jimmy Robinson - Hambone Johnson
- Delia Bogard - Tomboy Taylor
- Marvin Stephens - Katrink
- Buddy Brown - Stinkie Davis
- Kendall McComas - Scorpions member

== Alternate version ==
An edited version was released to television in the 1960s as a part of the Those Lovable Scallawags With Their Gangs series.

== Production ==
This was one of the few Mickey McGuire shorts without Jimmy Robinson. Another kid takes over for the role of 'Hambone'.
