= Mickey's Northwest Mounted =

1929 film

Mickey's Big Game Hunt
- Directed by: Albert Herman
- Written by: Fontaine Fox
- Produced by: Larry Darmour
- Starring: Mickey Rooney; Jimmy Robinson; Delia Bogard; Marvin Stephens; Buddy Brown; Kendall McComas
- Distributed by: Film Booking Offices of America
- Release date: June 9, 1929
- Running time: 20 minutes
- Country: United States
- Languages: Silent film English intertitles

Mickey's Northwest Mounted is a 1929 silent short film in Larry Darmour's Mickey McGuire series starring a young Mickey Rooney. Directed by Albert Herman, the two-reel short was released to theaters on June 9, 1929 by FBO.

== Plot ==
Stinkie Davis invites Mickey and the Scorpions to his rodeo. His invitation is actually a ploy to prank McGuire and his pals. However, things don't exactly go as planned for Stinkie. The kids partake in various picnic games, and Hambone gets into a headbutting contest with a goat.

== Notes ==
- An edited version of this film appeared on the Those Lovable Scallawags With Their Gangs television series.

== Cast ==
- Mickey Rooney - Mickey McGuire
- Jimmy Robinson - Hambone Johnson
- Delia Bogard - Tomboy Taylor
- Marvin Stephens - Katrink
- Buddy Brown - Stinkie Davis
- Kendall McComas - Master of ceremonies
