= Mickey's Covered Wagon =

- Directed by: J.A. Duffy
- Written by: Levering, Montgomery, & Grey (story)
- Produced by: Larry Darmour
- Starring: Mickey Rooney; Billy Barty; Jimmy Robinson; Shirley Jean Rickert; Marvin Stephens; Douglas Scott
- Cinematography: J.S. Brown, Jr.
- Edited by: Dwight Caldwell
- Music by: Lee Zahler
- Distributed by: Post Pictures Corp.
- Release date: November 30, 1933
- Running time: 18 minutes
- Country: United States
- Language: English

Mickey's Covered Wagon is a 1933 short film in Larry Darmour's Mickey McGuire series starring a young Mickey Rooney. Directed by Jesse Duffy, the two-reel short was released to theaters on November 30, 1933 by Post Pictures Corp.

== Plot ==
After helping an elderly friend of theirs, Mickey and the gang are rewarded with everything they need to go out mining as prospectors. Throughout an expedition 'out west' Stinkey Davis continuously tries to sabotage the kids' wagons. After finally getting rid of Stinkie, a storm begins to approach. The gang takes refuge in nearby deserted house, which is thought to be haunted.

== Cast ==
In order by credits:

- Mickey Rooney - "Mickey McGuire"
- Douglas Scott - "Stinkey Davis"
- Marvin Stephens - "Katrink"
- Jimmie Robinson - "Hambone Johnson"
- Billy Barty - Billy McGuire ("Mickey's Little Brother")
- Shirley Jeane Rickert - "Tomboy Taylor"
- Spencer Bell - Sam, Stinkey's chauffeur
