= Mickey's Minstrels =

- Directed by: Jesse Duffy; Wesley Morton (assistant director)
- Written by: Fontaine Fox; Levering, Blaiklock, & Young (story)
- Produced by: Larry Darmour
- Starring: Mickey Rooney; Douglas Scott; Marvin Stephens; Billy Barty; Jimmie Robinson; Shirley Jeane Rickert
- Cinematography: J.S. Brown
- Edited by: Dwight Caldwell
- Music by: Lee Zahler
- Distributed by: Post Pictures Corp.
- Release date: January 11, 1934
- Running time: 18 minutes
- Country: United States
- Language: English

Mickey's Minstrels is a 1934 short film in Larry Darmour's Mickey McGuire series starring a young Mickey Rooney. Directed by Jesse Duffy, the two-reel short was released to theaters on January 11, 1934, by Post Pictures Corp.

== Synopsis ==
Mickey and the Gang help cheer up Jimmy, a little sick boy, by giving him a puppy that they found. Unknown to the kids, the puppy actually belongs to Stinkie Davis. Stinkie and his father make the kids pay $10.00 in order to make up for the stolen puppy. The kids build a big grinding organ, with Mickey acting as the organ grinder, and Billy acting as the monkey. Later, the kids put on a minstrel show in a local talent contest.

== Cast ==
In Order by Credits:

- Mickey Rooney - Mickey McGuire
- Douglas Scott - "Stinkey" Davis
- Marvin Stephens - "Katrink"
- Billy Barty - Billy McGuire (Mickey's Little Brother)
- Jimmie Robinson - "Hambone" Johnson
- Shirley Jeane Rickert - "Tomboy" Taylor
- Robert McKenize - Grocery Man (uncredited)
- Spencer Bell - Frightened Man (uncredited)
