= Mickey in School =

1928 film

- Directed by: Albert Herman
- Written by: E.V. Durling (story); E.T. Montgomery (story); Joseph Basil (story)
- Produced by: Larry Darmour
- Starring: Mickey Rooney; Jimmy Robinson; Delia Bogard; Kendall McComas
- Cinematography: James Brown
- Edited by: Earl Neville
- Distributed by: Film Booking Offices of America
- Release date: February 6, 1928
- Running time: 20 minutes
- Country: United States
- Languages: Silent film English intertitles

Mickey in School is a 1928 silent short film in Larry Darmour's Mickey McGuire series starring a young Mickey Rooney. Directed by Albert Herman, the two-reel short was released to theaters on February 6, 1928, by FBO.

== Synopsis ==
It's time for Mickey and the kids to go back to school. During a game of tug-of-war against Stinkie Davis and his pals, the kids accidentally start a fire in the school.

== Notes ==
- An edited version was released to television in the 1960s as a part of the Mischief Makers series, under the title "Back to School".
- Mickey McGuire's full name is revealed to be "Michael Patrick Aloyisius McGuire".

== Cast ==
- Mickey Rooney - Mickey McGuire
- Jimmy Robinson - Hambone Johnson
- Delia Bogard - Tomboy Taylor
- Unknown - Katrink
- Unknown - Stinkie Davis
- Kendall McComas - Scorpions member
