= Mickey's Touchdown =

- Directed by: Tex Avery
- Written by: Levering, Montgomery, & Grey
- Produced by: Larry Darmour
- Starring: Mickey Rooney; Billy Barty; Jimmy Robinson; Shirley Jeane Rickert; Marvin Stephens; Douglas Scott
- Cinematography: J.S. Brown, Jr.
- Edited by: Dee Caldwell
- Music by: Carl W. Stalling
- Distributed by: Universal Pictures
- Release date: October 14, 1933
- Running time: 18 minutes
- Country: United States
- Language: English

Mickey's Touchdown is a 1933 short film in Larry Darmour's Mickey McGuire series starring a young Mickey Rooney. Directed by Jesse Duffy, the two-reel short was released to theaters on October 14, 1933 by Post Pictures Corp.

== Plot ==
Mickey and the Gang are gearing up for a football game against Stinkey Davis and his pals. Because Mickey's team apparently have no chance of winning, they enlist the aid of college football coach Howard Jones for advice. Jealous, Stinkey decides to steal Mickey's clothes, dress up as him, and cause havoc in town. His plan manages to get Mickey stuck in a courtroom for the day and out of the game. It's up to Howard Jones and Mickey's pals to save the day.

== Notes ==
First appearances of Douglas Scott and Shirley Jean Rickert who (respectively) took over for the roles of 'Stinkey Davis' and 'Tomboy Taylor'.

== Cast ==
In Order by Credits:

- Mickey Rooney - Mickey McGuire
- Douglas Scott - "Stinkey" Davis
- Marvin Stephens - Katrink'
- Jimmie Robinson - "Hambone" Johnson
- Billy Barty - Billy McGuire ("Mickey's Little Brother")
- Shirley Jeane Rickert - "Tomboy" Taylor
- Kit Guard - "Stinkey" Davis Coach
- Howard Jones - Himself
- Spec O'Donnell - Referee (uncredited)
- Robert McKenzie - Judge (uncredited)
