= Mickey's Tent Show =

- Directed by: J.A. Duffy; Wesley Morton (assistant director)
- Written by: Levering, Montgomery, & Grey (story)
- Produced by: Larry Darmour
- Starring: Mickey Rooney; Billy Barty; Jimmy Robinson; Shirley Jean Rickert; Marvin Stephens; Douglas Scott
- Cinematography: J.S. Brown, Jr.
- Edited by: Dee Caldwell
- Music by: Lee Zahler
- Distributed by: Post Pictures Corp.
- Release date: October 27, 1933
- Running time: 18 minutes
- Country: United States
- Language: English

Mickey's Tent Show is a 1933 short film in Larry Darmour's Mickey McGuire series starring a young Mickey Rooney. Directed by Jesse Duffy, the two-reel short was released to theaters by RKO and RFO.

== Synopsis ==
Mickey and the Gang decide to put on a circus show for the neighborhood kids. As usual, Stinkie Davis and his pals try whatever they can to make their rivals miserable. Throughout the show, whenever Mickey and his friends try to perform an act, Stinkie interrupts them by playing his father's new radio.

== Cast ==
In order by credits:

- Mickey Rooney - "Mickey McGuire"
- Douglas Scott - "Stinkey" Davis
- Marvin Stephens - "Katrink"
- Jimmie Robinson - "Hambone" Johnson
- Billy Barty - Billy McGuire ("Mickey's Little Brother")
- Shirley Jeane Rickert - "Tomboy Taylor"
