= The Big Chance =

The Big Chance may refer to:

- The Big Chance (1933 film), a 1933 American crime film directed by Albert Herman
- The Big Chance (1934 film), a 1934 German comedy film directed by Victor Janson
- The Big Chance (1957 German film), a 1957 German romantic comedy film directed by Hans Quest
- The Big Chance (1957 British film), a 1957 British drama film directed by Peter Graham Scott
- The name of various episodes of TV series such as The Roy Rogers Show (1955), The Adventures of McGraw (1958), Dragnet (1954) and Window on Main Street (1962)
