= E. V. Durling =

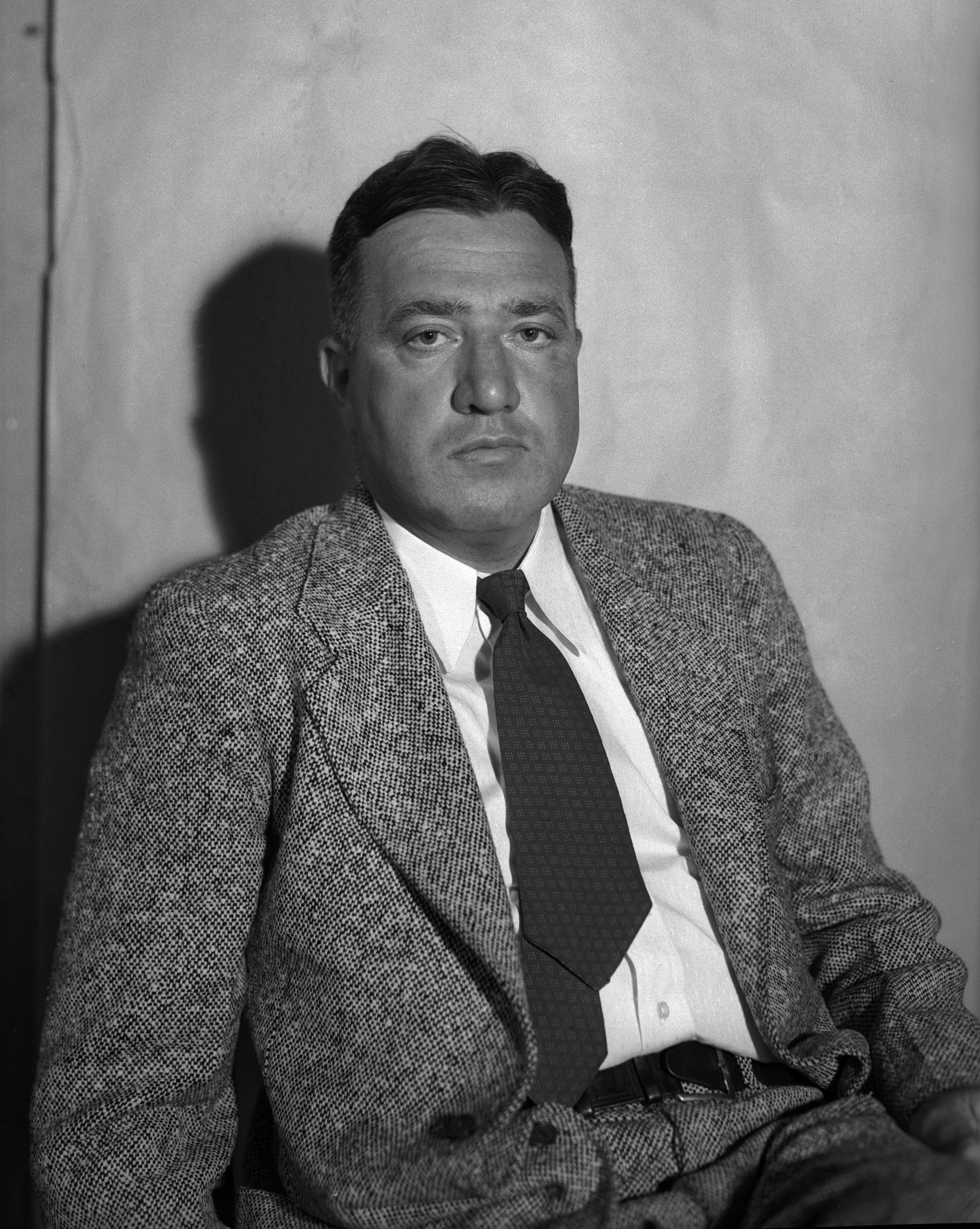
Durling in the 1930s

Edgar Vincent Durling (1893–1957), usually known as E. V. Durling, was one of the first journalists to cover the Hollywood motion picture industry and later became a nationally syndicated newspaper columnist in the United States, with his column "On the Side".

== Early life ==
Durling was born in Manhattan, New York City, on July 24, 1893, and moved to Brooklyn with his family at the age of seven. He attended Phillips Andover Academy in Massachusetts, where he played baseball and football, and graduated from Wesleyan University in Connecticut.

== Career ==
He began work as a journalist while still at Wesleyan, as a correspondent for the Springfield Republican in Massachusetts. He was the Pacific Coast correspondent of the New York Morning Telegraph from 1915 to 1918, thus becoming one of the first Hollywood reporters. He was in the Coast Guard during World War I, then worked for the New York Evening Globe and the New York Herald. In 1924 he left journalism to head the writing department of a Hollywood comedy studio. In 1925 he was general manager of the Fine Arts Motion Picture Company.

He returned to journalism in 1931 as a columnist on the Los Angeles Express and then moved to the Los Angeles Illustrated Daily News, where his column was called "Town Talk." He moved to the Los Angeles Times on February 16, 1936; his new column, "On the Side" (on the left side of the first page of the local section) was welcomed as a "whimsical, good-natured and slyly philosophical outlook on life." He left the Times in November 1939 when he received an offer from King Features Syndicate to write for national distribution.

Durling died in New York City on September 13, 1957, at the age of sixty-four. He was survived by his wife, Joan Marie Durling.

== Partial filmography ==
- Almost Married (1919)
- Forbidden (1919)
- Reported Missing (1922)
- Manhattan Madness (1925)
- Mickey's Eleven (1927)
- Mickey's Movies (1928)
- Mickey's Champs (1930)
- Air Eagles (1931)

== See also ==
- List of newspaper columnists
