= Mickey McGuire (film series) =

U.S. short subject comedy series (1927–34)

Mickey McGuire is an American comedy series of short subjects from 1927 to 1934. Produced by Larry Darmour, the series was notable for essentially launching the careers of Mickey Rooney and Billy Barty.

The series was based on Fontaine Fox's popular comic strip series, Toonerville Folks. In 1925 Fox placed a newspaper ad for a dark-haired child to play the role of "Mickey McGuire" in a series of short films. This ad attracted the attention of Mrs Nell Yule, the recently separated wife of vaudevillian Joseph Yule, who believed her son Joseph "Joe" Yule, Jr. (later known as Mickey Rooney) was right for the part. Lacking the money to have her son's hair dyed, Mrs. Yule took her son to the audition after applying burnt cork to his scalp. Joe got the role and became "Mickey" for 78 of the comedies, running from 1927 to 1934, starting with Mickey's Circus, released September 4, 1927, and ending with Mickey's Medicine Man in 1934. These had been adapted from the Toonerville Trolley comic strip, which contained a character named Mickey McGuire.

Yule briefly became Mickey McGuire legally in order to trump an attempted copyright lawsuit (if it were his legal name, the film producer Larry Darmour did not owe the comic strip writers royalties). His mother also changed her surname to McGuire in an attempt to bolster the argument, but the film producers lost. The litigation settlement awarded damages to the owners of the cartoon character, as well as compelled the twelve-year-old actor to refrain from calling himself by the name Mickey McGuire on and off screen. Rooney later claimed that, during his Mickey McGuire days, he met cartoonist Walt Disney at the Warner Brothers studio, and that Disney was inspired to name Mickey Mouse after him, although Disney always said that he had changed the name from "Mortimer Mouse" to "Mickey Mouse" on the suggestion of his wife.

The series was very popular in its day, often rivaling Hal Roach's Our Gang series. In fact, it was the only Our Gang series rival to make a successful transition into the talkies. The films were later distributed well into the 1940s, but were rarely shown on television. Therefore, the series is all but forgotten today.

== Cast and characters ==
The series had a wide variety of interesting characters, many of which were created by Fontaine Fox. The characters lived in a town known as Toonerville.

- Mickey McGuire is a tough, street-wise lower class kid of Irish descent. He usually wears a shirt with a tablecloth pattern, a pair of pants rolled up to his knees, a pair of shoes that are two sizes too big, and a derby with a large hole at the top. He has greasy black hair, which according to Mickey Rooney was actually something similar to coal dust, as his mother could not afford to dye his hair properly for the role. He said that "it wasn't fun, but I did it anyway". He is the leader of the Scorpions club, and often leads the club into mischief. Mickey doesn't take back talk from anybody, no matter how big they may be. Though Mickey is extremely tough in the series' earlier years, he progresses into more of a heartfelt character as time goes on. In the series' later years, Mickey often tries to assist the less fortunate people in town any way he can. In the silent era, Mickey is often stuck babysitting his baby brother (referred to as "Mickey's Kid Brudder"). During the talkie era, the baby disappeared and was replaced by "Billy McGuire". Mickey McGuire was played by Mickey Rooney from 1927 until the series' end in 1934. For reasons unknown, Rooney was absent from the series during the 1931-1932 season. Co-star Marvin Stephens took over for the role for that season in Rooney's absence.
- Hambone Johnson is Mickey's best friend. Hambone (or "Ham" for short) is an African-American kid. He usually wears a short sleeve shirt, shorts, overgrown shoes, and a sack hat with a clothespin pinned to it. Because of the time the series was produced, Hambone was sometimes forced to be depicted as an exaggerated African American stereotype. However, Hambone proved to have more dignity than most characters who were in this sort of a role. Hambone is often taken advantage of by Mickey. However, Hambone has sometimes questioned Mickey's ways, asking him, "Why do I always have to do everything?". Nonetheless, Hambone clearly has a close friendship with Mickey. Whenever Mickey feels he needs somebody to go with him for one reason or another, he almost always chooses Hambone. Despite the fact that Mickey takes advantage of Hambone, he has also shown worry for Hambone's safety. One example is in Mickey's Ape Man (1933), where Ham is in danger, and calls out for help. Mickey is quick to jump into action and save his pal. Ham also is usually the one who is left in charge of the Scorpions whenever Mickey is not present. Hambone has a younger brother named "Lucky", who appeared towards the end of the series. Hambone was played by Jimmy Robinson for a majority of the series. However, he has been replaced by another actor in a few of the films due to unknown absences.
- Billy McGuire is Mickey's younger brother. A blonde haired boy, he often wears a short sleeve shirt, shorts with suspenders, and small shoes. Billy first appeared early on in the talkie era. During the silent era, Mickey often had to babysit his baby brother (played by a variety of unknown infants). Without any explanation, Billy showed up early in the talkie era, originally being known as "Shorty". Billy's role in the series grew as time went on. He is essentially the runt of the group, sometimes left out of the fun for being too small. In situations like this, Billy manages to outsmart the older kids, and proves that he can do just as much as they can, if not more. Other times, Billy winds up being the hero, saving the other kids from certain danger. On other occasions, Mickey calls on Billy for special tasks, evidently recognizing the talents his younger brother has to offer. Billy was played by Billy Barty, who played the role of "Mickey's Kid Brudder" in at least one of the series' silents.
- Stinky (or "Stinkie") Davis is Mickey's arch rival. Stinkie typically wears a Little Lord Fauntleroy outfit. Unlike Mickey and his pals, Stinkie is wealthy, snobbish, and always ready to poke fun at the Scorpions. Stinkie takes after his father, Henry Davis, who later becomes the mayor of Toonerville. Stinkie often tries to make the lives of Mickey and the Scorpions as miserable as possible. However, Mickey and his gang prove to be smarter than Stinkie and his friends, always turning the tables on their rivals (sometimes completely unaware of it). Stinky was played by a wide variety of actors throughout the series run. From 1927 to 1928, the role was played by an unknown actor, believed by some to be Leo Lowenstein, step-son of Monty Banks. Buddy Brown took over the role until the end of the silent era. Series supporting player Kendall McComas briefly played the role in the series' earliest talkies of 1929. Douglas Fox played the role from 1930 until 1933. Douglas Scott played the role for the series' final season, appearing in five of the last six films.
- Tomboy Taylor is a member of Mickey's gang, and is the only girl in the gang. Tomboy is a blonde haired girl who wears a hairnet (which causes her hair to stick straight up), a dress, visible bloomers, and knee high socks. Though the only girl in the club, Tomboy is treated like a regular member of the gang. She proves to be just as tough as the boys, always ready to fight Stinkie's gang with the rest of the kids. However, Tomboy has shown femininity, such as in Mickey's Ape Man (1933) where she would rather stay behind and make a dress than go out hunting with the boys. Tomboy was played by Delia Bogard from the beginning to the series until 1933. Shirley Jean Rickert took over the role for the final season.
- Katrink is a member of Mickey's gang. He is a normal sized boy, but has large muscles and an incredible amount of strength. Katrink' has blonde hair, and usually wears a sweat shirt, long pants, a hat. Katrink' sometimes shows his incredible amount of strength by easily lifting heavy objects. He was played by Marvin Stephens for most of the series, going as far back as 1928. Prior to that, the role was played by a few unknown actors. Mickey Rooney was absent from the series for the 1931-1932 season, and Stephens was chosen to take over the role of McGuire. Since Stephens was busy playing another character, Katrink' was taken over by Donald Haines.

== Films ==
Silent Films

1927

- Mickey's Circus
- Mickey's Pals
- Mickey's Eleven
- Mickey's Battle

1928

- Mickey's Parade
- Mickey in School
- Mickey's Nine
- Mickey's Little Eva
- Mickey's Wild West
- Mickey in Love
- Mickey's Triumph
- Mickey's Babies
- Mickey's Movies
- Mickey's Rivals
- Mickey the Detective
- Mickey's Athletes
- Mickey's Big Game Hunt

1929

- Mickey's Great Idea
- Mickey's Explorers
- Mickey's Menagerie
- Mickey's Last Chance
- Mickey's Brown Derby
- Mickey's Northwest Mounted
- Mickey's Initiation

Sound Films

1929

- Mickey's Midnite Follies
- Mickey's Surprise
- Mickey's Mix-Up
- Mickey's Big Moment
- Mickey's Strategy

1930

- Mickey's Champs
- Mickey's Master Mind
- Mickey's Luck
- Mickey's Whirlwinds
- Mickey's Warriors
- Mickey the Romeo
- Mickey's Merry Men
- Mickey's Winners
- Mickey's Musketeers
- Mickey's Bargain

1931

- Mickey's Stampede
- Mickey's Crusaders
- Mickey's Rebellion
- Mickey's Diplomacy
- Mickey's Wildcats
- Mickey's Thrill Hunters
- Mickey's Helping Hand
- Mickey's Side Line

1932

- Mickey's Busy Day
- Mickey's Travels
- Mickey's Holiday
- Mickey's Big Business
- Mickey's Golden Rule
- Mickey's Charity

1933

- Mickey's Ape Man
- Mickey's Race
- Mickey's Big Broadcast
- Mickey's Disguises
- Mickey's Touchdown
- Mickey's Tent Show
- Mickey's Covered Wagon

1934

- Mickey's Minstrels
- Mickey's Rescue
- Mickey's Medicine Man

1945

- Mickey the Great (feature film compilation)

== Reissues ==
Although the series ended in 1934, several of the films were reissued well in the 1940s. These reissues were often given new titles (i.e. Mickey's Race became Mickey's Derby Day, Mickey's Merry Men became Mickeys Brigade).

In 1945, Darmour and former series director Jesse Duffy edited five of the shorts into a feature film compilation titled Mickey the Great. In this feature, Delia Bogard and two of the series' female supporting players returned to 'host' the complication of shorts. The five films used (Mickey's Big Broadcast, Mickey's Charity, Mickey's Ape Man, Mickey's Disguises, and Mickey's Race) were cut down to about half of their original length, and music was added into the background of each film.

Many of the shorts found their way into the home movie market. The edited versions of the films used for Mickey the Great showed up on the market, as did various five-minute clips of the silent shorts for toy reel projectors.

The last six shorts in the series were originally distributed by Columbia Pictures. Along with several other Columbia short subjects, these six films were distributed by Columbia's Screen Gems and shown on television beginning in 1958.

The silent films also appeared on various television programs that also featured various Our Gang silent shorts. The Mischief Makers series, created by National Telepix, was a children's program during the early 1960s, and mainly featured various Pathe Our Gang silents cut down to about half of their original length. Sound effects and carnival music were added to the films, as were narration. Some of the McGuire shorts found their way into this package. Shorts from other Our Gang rival series also wound up in the package.

Another children's television program Those Lovable Scallawags with their Gangs also featured various Our Gang silents, as well as various rival series shorts (including Mickey McGuire).

The films were rarely shown on television, as opposed to the Our Gang shorts. Because of this, the series is hardly remembered today.

The late 1980s brought the arrival of the Mickey McGuire shorts to home video for the first time. United American Video and Summit Media Co. released three volumes of the Columbia Mickey McGuire shorts. Mickey Rooney introduced each short.

In 2001, ten of the sound shorts made their way to home video on five VHS tapes through Virgil Films and Ent. Though the films were mostly unedited, Virgil did add piano music into the background of some scenes that mainly had action in them, rather than dialogue.

In 2006, 8thman restored and remastered nineteen of the films, and released them to DVD. Though restored, 8thman did add a musical soundtrack into the background of selected scenes.
