= Fighting Thoroughbreds =

- Theatrical release poster
- Directed by: Sidney Salkow
- Screenplay by: Wellyn Totman
- Story by: Clarence Marks; Robert Wyler
- Produced by: Armand Schaefer
- Starring: Ralph Byrd; Mary Carlisle; Robert Allen; George "Gabby" Hayes; Marvin Stephens; Charles C. Wilson
- Cinematography: Jack A. Marta
- Edited by: Ernest J. Nims
- Music by: Cy Feuer; William Lava
- Production company: Republic Pictures
- Distributed by: Republic Pictures
- Release date: January 6, 1939
- Running time: 63 minutes
- Country: United States
- Language: English

Fighting Thoroughbreds is a 1939 American drama film directed by Sidney Salkow and written by Wellyn Totman. The film stars Ralph Byrd, Mary Carlisle, Robert Allen, George "Gabby" Hayes, Marvin Stephens and Charles C. Wilson. The film was released on January 6, 1939, by Republic Pictures.

== Cast ==
- Ralph Byrd as Ben Marshall
- Mary Carlisle as Marian
- Robert Allen as Greg Bogart
- George "Gabby" Hayes as 'Gramps' Montrose
- Marvin Stephens as Hefty
- Charles C. Wilson as Spencer Bogart
- Kenne Duncan as Brady
- Victor Kilian as Wilson
- Edwin Brian as Colton
