= The Godmothers =

- Theatrical release poster
- Directed by: William Grefe
- Written by: Mickey Rooney; Bob Hilliard; Woody King
- Produced by: Michael Viola
- Distributed by: Viola Film Distributors
- Release date: 1973
- Running time: 78 minutes
- Country: United States
- Language: English

The Godmothers is a 1973 American film written by and starring Mickey Rooney. It became entangled in legal dramas.

== Premsie ==
Two brothers pose as women to avoid marrying a mobster's daughter.

== Cast ==
- Mickey Rooney
- Jerry Lester
- Frank Fontaine
- Billy Barty
- Joe E. Ross
- Muriel Jayne
- Lou Marsh
- Tony Adams
- Courtney Brown
- Socrates Ballis
- Maxine Coates
- Marcy Knight
- Judy LaScala
- Pauly Clash
- Michael DeBeausset
- Mike Falco
- Templeton Fox
- Oak R. Gentry
- Mal Jones
- William Kerwin
- Frank Logan
- Gertrude Marx
- Clair Fontaine
- Joe De Stefano

== Producer ==
The movie was shot in Florida. Director William Grefe recalled:

Mickey [Rooney] would have a big, artistic, creative thought in the middle of the night and he’d rewrite the whole scene. And he’d come in and hand me seven or eight pages... Everything was chaotic during the filming... I think I was more of a traffic cop than a director on that one. When you get five or six night club trained, vaudeville type comedians and you’re trying to direct them...thesc guys were going in 25 directions.
