= Shirley Jean Rickert =

American actress (1926–2009)

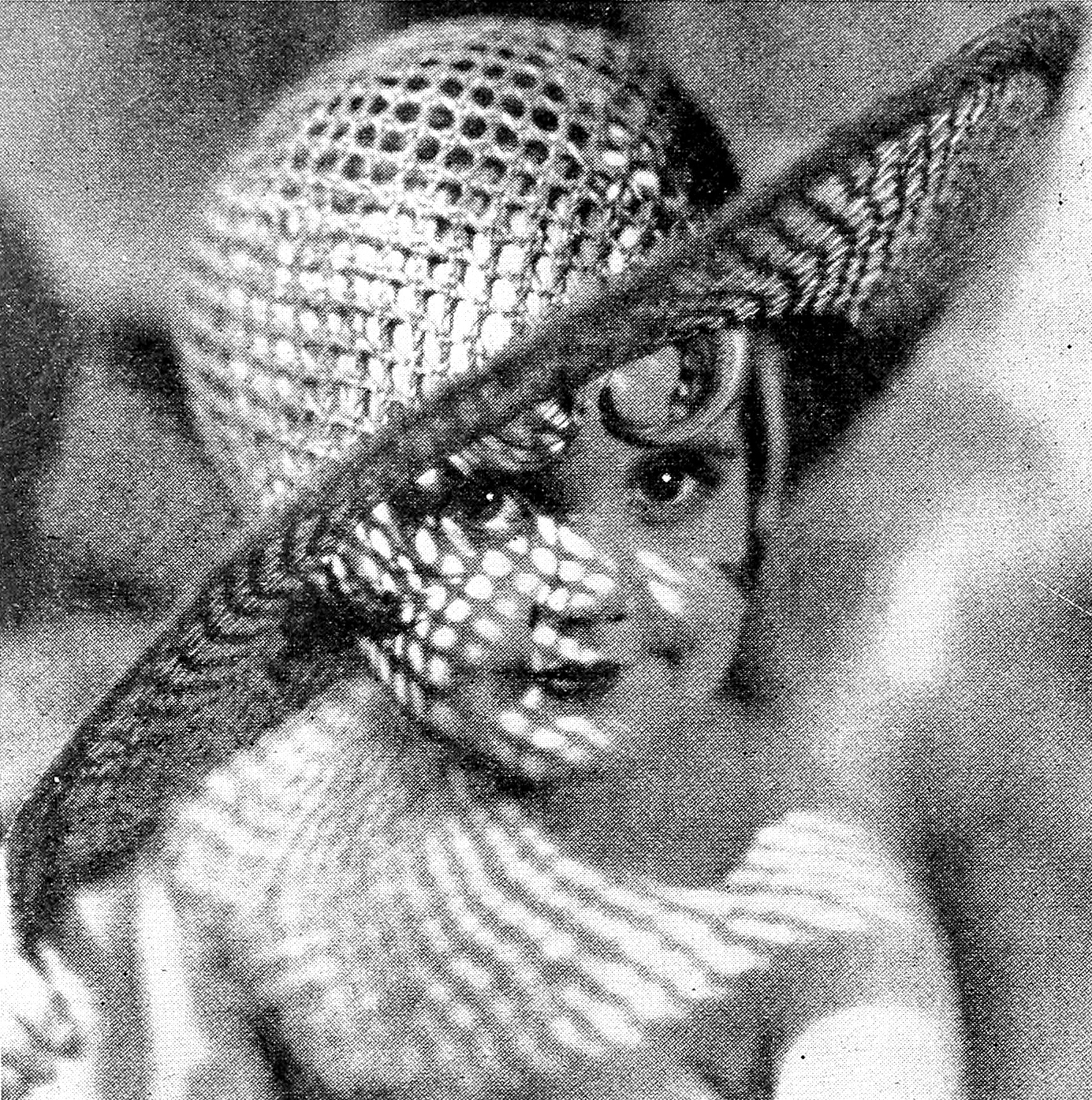
- Rickert, c. 1930
- Born: March 25, 1926; Seattle, Washington, U.S.
- Died: February 6, 2009 (aged 82); Saratoga Springs, New York, U.S.
- Occupations: Child actress Exotic Dancer
- Years active: 1927–1973

Shirley Jean Rickert (March 25, 1926 – February 6, 2009) was an American child actress who was briefly the "blonde girl" for the Our Gang series in 1931, during the Hal Roach early talkie period.

== Career ==
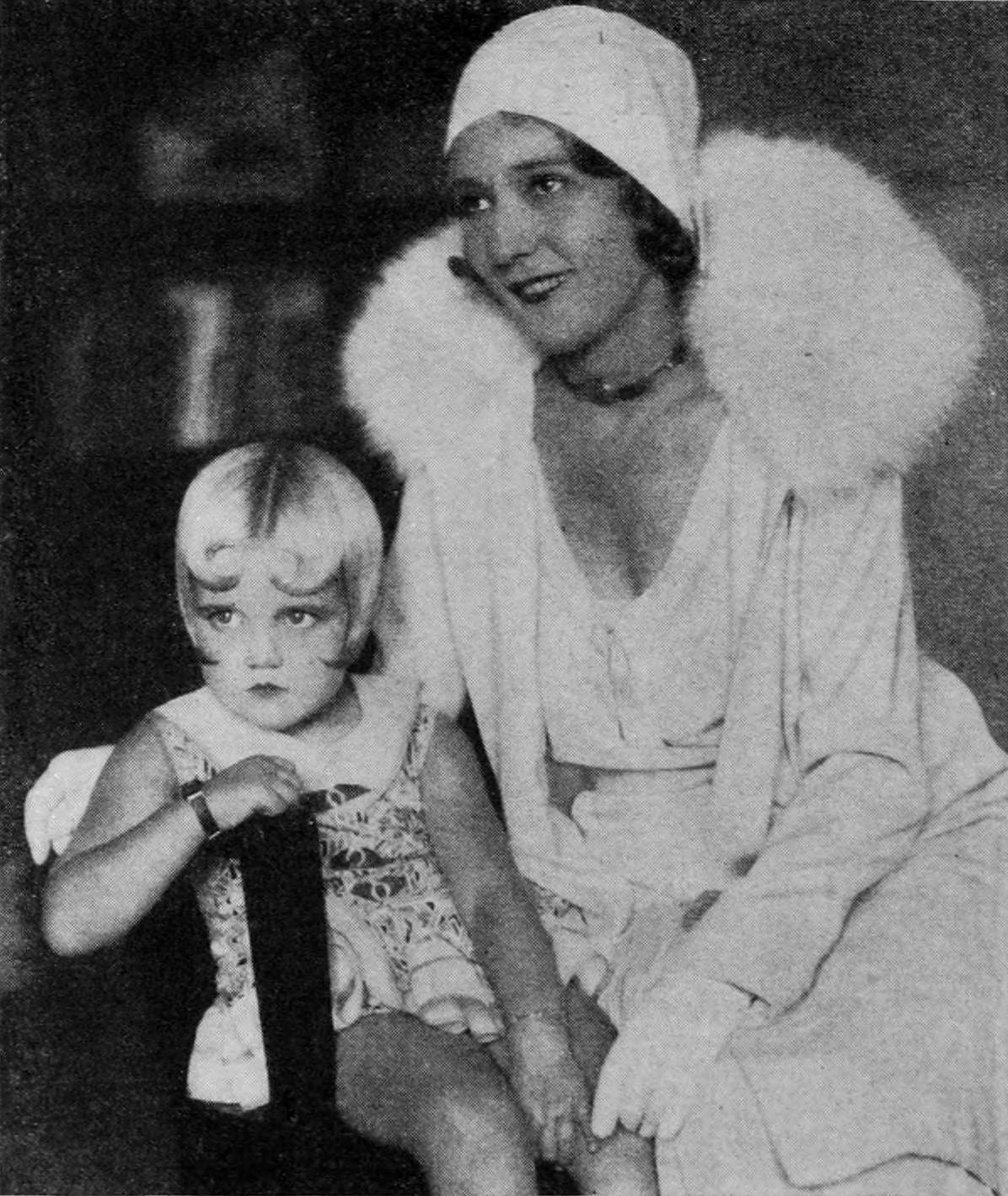
Rickert with Mary Pickford in 1930.

At 18 months of age, Rickert won a local baby beauty contest, which emboldened her mother to move the family to Hollywood. She made her screen debut at the age of four in the short How's My Baby (1930), soon followed by her Our Gang debut, Helping Grandma in 1931. Rickert's most notable appearances were in the films Love Business and Bargain Day, in which her spit-curls, inspired by those of Ruth Taylor's in Gentlemen Prefer Blondes, were the centerpiece of her precocious performance.

After Rickert left the Our Gang series, she had a brief movie career, including starring roles as Tomboy Taylor alongside Mickey Rooney in eight Mickey McGuire comedies, followed by a string of jobs including driving trucks for the U.S. Army Air Corps during World War II. She later worked in burlesque as an exotic dancer, billed as Gilda and Her Crowning Glory (after her long blonde hair), retiring from burlesque in 1959.

People are so amazed to hear I went from movies into burlesque. Well, I'll tell you, I prefer burlesque because it's not so immoral as the movie business.

— Shirley Jean Rickert, 1955 news article

In the mid-1970s, she became a traveling saleswoman for industrial hardware, surprising potential clients with her starring roles in Our Gang. Later, she performed in local theater productions, helped to maintain a Web fansite, and made occasional public appearances. She also sold her crafts at a local shop with her daughter's family.

== Death ==
Rickert died in a nursing home on February 6, 2009, after a long illness. She was 82.

== Filmography ==
| Year | Title | Role | Series |
|---|---|---|---|
| 1930 | How's My Baby | The Baby | |
| 1930 | Night Work | uncredited orphan | |
| 1930 | Follow Thru | uncredited child | |
| 1931 | Helping Grandma | Shirley | Our Gang |
| 1931 | Love Business | Shirley | Our Gang |
| 1931 | Little Daddy | Shirley | Our Gang |
| 1931 | The Stolen Jools | | |
| 1931 | Bargain Day | Shirley | Our Gang |
| 1931 | Fly My Kite | Shirley | Our Gang |
| 1932 | Love Pains | uncredited girl | |
| 1932 | Once in a Lifetime | uncredited girl | |
| 1933 | Mickey's Touchdown | Tomboy Taylor | Mickey McGuire |
| 1933 | Mickey's Tent Show | Tomboy Taylor | Mickey McGuire |
| 1933 | Mickey's Covered Wagon | Tomboy Taylor | Mickey McGuire |
| 1934 | Mickey's Minstrels | Tomboy Taylor | Mickey McGuire |
| 1934 | Mickey's Rescue | Tomboy Taylor | Mickey McGuire |
| 1934 | Mickey's Medicine Man | Tomboy Taylor | Mickey McGuire |
| 1934 | The Scarlet Letter | Humility Crakstone | |
| 1934 | I'll Fix It | uncredited girl | |
| 1934 | 'Neath the Arizona Skies | Nina | |
| 1934 | One Hour Late | uncredited girl | |
| 1935 | Straight from the Heart | uncredited girl | |
| 1935 | The Drunkard | Julia | |
| 1935 | I Live My Life | uncredited child | |
| 1936 | Crash Donovan | uncredited child | |
| 1940 | Five Little Peppers in Trouble | Kiki | Five Little Peppers |
| 1942 | The Major and the Minor | uncredited student | |
| 1942 | Get Hep to Love | uncredited student | |
| 1943 | Best Foot Forward | uncredited dancer | |
| 1943 | In Old Oklahoma aka War of the Wildcats | uncredited dancer | |
| 1944 | Meet the People | uncredited dancer | |
| 1946 | If I'm Lucky | uncredited dancer | |
| 1947 | Good News | uncredited dancer | |
| 1951 | Royal Wedding | uncredited dancer | |
| 1952 | The Pace That Thrills | uncredited girl | |
| 1952 | Singin' in the Rain | uncredited dancer | |
| 1953 | The A-B-Cs of Love | Gilda | |
| 1954 | The Human Jungle | uncredited stripper | |
