= Last Will and Embezzlement =

Last Will and Embezzlement is a 2012 documentary film about elder financial abuse, directed by Deborah Louise Robinson and written and produced by Robinson and Pamela S.K. Glasner. The film is narrated by Artie Pasquale, who played Burt Gervasi on The Sopranos. The film features an "impassioned" Mickey Rooney describing the financial abuse he endured at the hands of a family member. Rooney had testified before the United States Senate Special Committee on Aging in 2011 about the years of financial abuse he says he suffered from a relative. He also filed for a restraining order against a stepson.

== Critical reception ==
The New York Times described the movie's style as "seesawing between concerned experts and moving case histories" and said that "the film has a bare-bones look that only intensifies its nearly painful sincerity". Slant Magazine was harshly critical of the film, calling it "inept, unwatchable, and sometimes tastelessly exploitive", and concluding that it is "obnoxiously simplistic". The Village Voice was also negative in its coverage, commenting that the clips from the interview with Rooney "merely exacerbate the earnest but graceless documentary's editorial clumsiness, aesthetic flatness, and endless repetition".
