= The Big Chance (1933 film) =

1933 film

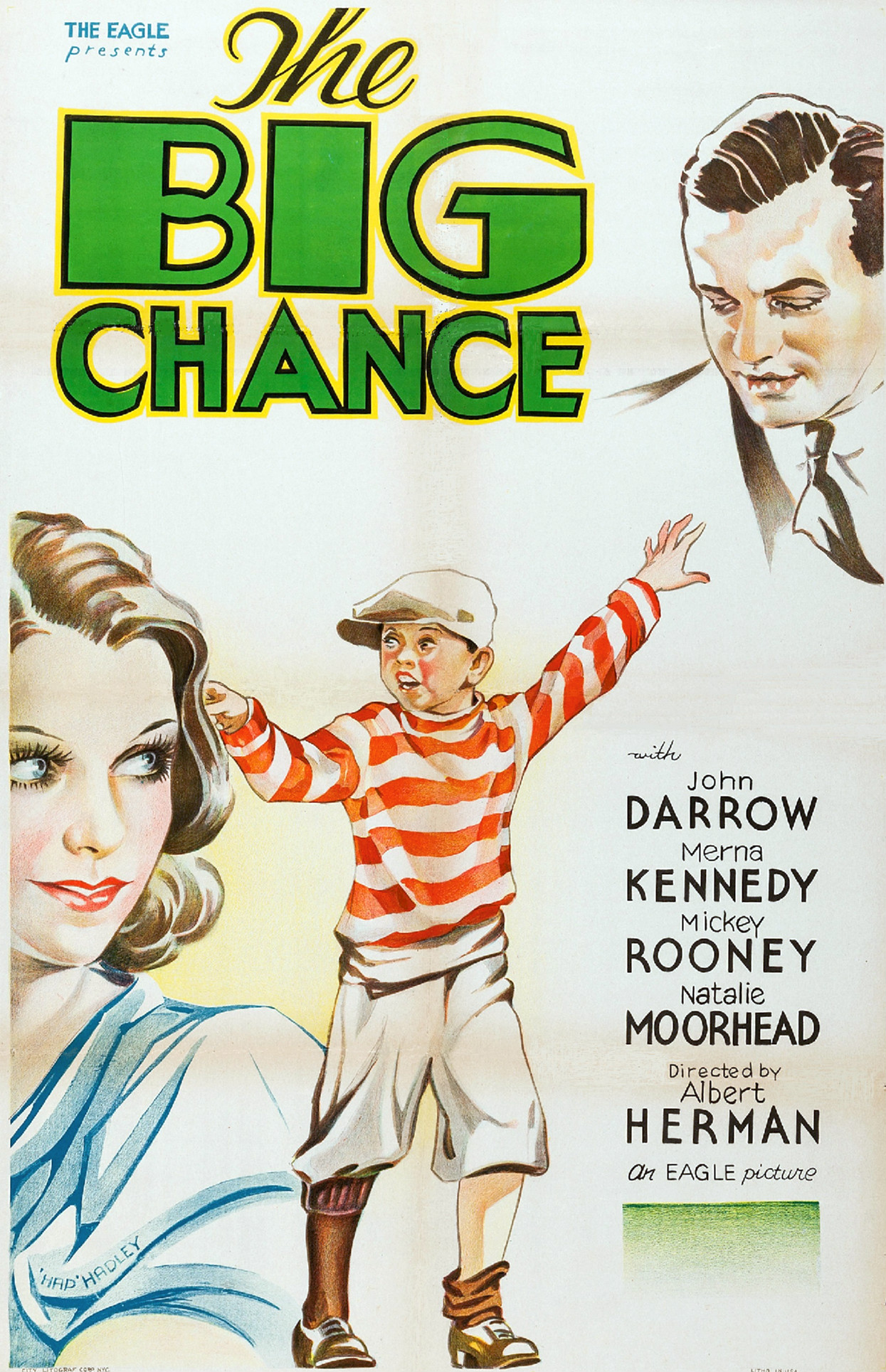
- Film poster
- Directed by: Albert Herman
- Written by: Mauri Grashin (original story); Mauri Grashin (screenplay)
- Produced by: Morris Shiller (producer)
- Starring: See below
- Cinematography: George Meehan
- Edited by: Jack Bruggy
- Music by: Bernard B. Brown; Norman Spencer
- Distributed by: Arthur Greenblatt Distribution Services
- Release date: 1933
- Running time: 62 minutes
- Country: United States
- Language: English

The Big Chance is a 1933 American Pre-Code crime film directed by Albert Herman. It was produced by the independent Eagle Pictures and released on the states-rights market.

== Plot ==
'Knockout Morgan', an up-and-coming boxer, is matched against the world champion, but his corrupt manager, 'Flash', orders him to throw the fight – he'll make more money that way. To ensure Morgan's compliance, he kidnaps Morgan's girlfriend's young brother. In the nick of time, Morgan and his girlfriend rescue him, and Morgan takes to the ring. He wins the fight.

== Cast ==
- John Darrow as Knockout Frankie (Rocky) Morgan
- Merna Kennedy as Mary Wilson
- Natalie Moorhead as Babe
- Mickey Rooney as Arthur Wilson
- Matthew Betz as Flash McQuaid
- Hank Mann as Tugboat
- Virginia True Boardman as Mrs. Wilson (uncredited)

== Reception ==
The Big Chance is "a sensational expose of the prize fight racket", according to a 1933 newspaper review, which also mentioned its "splendid cast." The film features one of the first cinematic depictions of a sports broadcast.
