= Spencer Bell (actor) =

American actor (1887–1935)

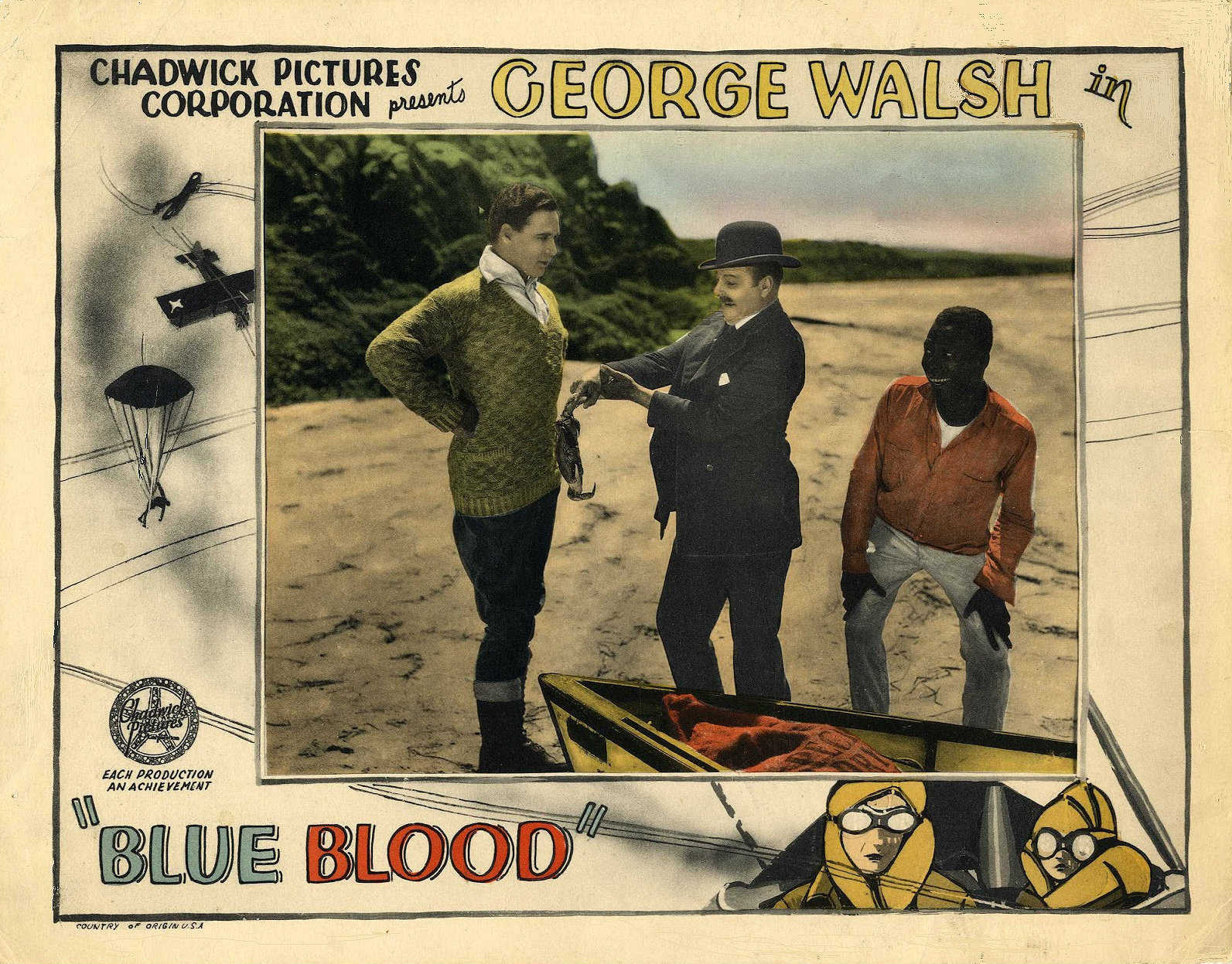
- Lobby card for Blue Blood (1925)
- Born: September 25, 1887; Lexington, Kentucky, U.S.
- Died: August 18, 1935 (aged 47); Los Angeles, California, U.S.
- Resting place: Sawtelle Military Cemetery
- Occupation: Actor
- Years active: 1919–1934

Spencer Bell (September 25, 1887 – August 18, 1935) was an American stage and film actor, best known for playing opposite Larry Semon in many of his silent comedy shorts from the late 1910s to 1928. Bell was one of the first African American comedic actors of the silent film era, and was the first to be signed to film contract. Over the course of his fifteen-year film career, Bell appeared in more than seventy comedy shorts.

== Career ==
Bell was born in Lexington, Kentucky. Prior to his Hollywood film career, he worked as a chauffeur and performed in vaudeville and minstrel shows. He enlisted in the United States Army and served in World War I. Bell made his film debut in Larry Semon's 1919 silent comedy short, Passing the Buck. As was typical for African American actors of the era, Bell was typecast in stereotypical roles. His characters were often depicted as bumbling, lazy buffoons who were prone to comedic accidents.

During the 1930s, Bell regularly appeared in the Mickey McGuire film series starring Mickey Rooney, and briefly ran an acting troupe in Harlem. Bell's final film appearance was in the 1934 comedy short Mickey's Medicine Man.

== Death ==
On August 18, 1935, Bell died at his home in Los Angeles, California of complications from abdominal surgery he underwent in July 1935. He is buried at Sawtelle Military Cemetery (now known as Los Angeles National Cemetery).

== Selected filmography ==
Year	Title	Role	Notes
1925	The Wizard of Oz	Cowardly Lion / Rastus / Snowball	Silent
1927	Oh, What a Man!	Waiter	
1928	The Midnight Taxi	Rastus	
1929	The Rodeo	Magnolia's Husband	
1931	Be Big!	Porter	Uncredited
1931	Smart Money	Suntan	Uncredited
1932	Heavens! My Husband!	Porter	Uncredited
1933	Blue of the Night	Porter	Uncredited
