= Kendall McComas =

American child actor (1916–1981)

- Born: October 29, 1916; Holton, Kansas, U.S.
- Died: October 15, 1981 (aged 64); Lake Isabella, California, U.S.
- Occupations: Child actor Engineer
- Years active: 1927-1965

Kendall Frederick McComas (October 29, 1916 – October 15, 1981) was an American child actor, notable for appearing as "Breezy Brisbane" in the Our Gang comedies in 1932 and Mickey Rooney's rival "Stinky Davis" in the Mickey McGuire series in 1929. He was a native of Holton, Kansas.

== Career ==
Born in Holton, Kansas, McComas first appeared in the Mickey McGuire short subjects series as a member of Mickey McGuire's gang and stayed throughout the series run in the silent era. He also played the role of Stinky Davis in some of the series' earliest sound shorts. In 1931, he joined the Our Gang series, first appearing in the 1932 Our Gang short Readin' and Writin'. McComas stayed with Our Gang for a full year and left the series after appearing in the 1932 short Birthday Blues.

Even though he was well into his teens during his Our Gang tenure, McComas was very short for his age and thus capably portrayed his grade-school-age character Brisbane aka Breezy. Breezy's mother refers to him as "Brisbane" in the films Readin' and Writin' and Spanky, the only shorts in which that name appears; the kids refer to him as "Breezy," presumably as a nickname for Brisbane. However, the Leonard Maltin/Richard Bann book The Little Rascals: The Life & Times of Our Gang lists his character as "Breezy Brisbane," a name which does not appear in dialogue in any of the shorts in which McComas appears. However, right after getting expelled from school in Readin' and Writin', Brisbane goes to the fishing hole, and begins mentally telling himself to "Learn that poem". There, he refers to himself as "Breezy" when he thinks, "You better get busy, Breezy, and study that poem."

In 1965, he left show business and became an electrical engineer at the U.S. Naval Weapons Center in China Lake, California and then an institutional mortgage-backed bond salesman under the name John Mandy.

== Death ==
McComas committed suicide in a fit of depression two weeks before turning 65 when he was facing mandatory retirement from his job.

== Our Gang filmography ==
- Readin' and Writin' (1932)
- Free Eats (1932)
- Spanky (1932)
- Choo-Choo! (1932)
- The Pooch (1932)
- Hook and Ladder (1932)
- Free Wheeling (1932)
- Birthday Blues (1932)
