= Delia Bogard =

American actress

- Born: June 26, 1921; San Francisco, California, United States
- Died: July 15, 1995 (aged 74); Los Angeles
- Father: Harry Bogard

Delia Bogard (June 26, 1921 - July 15, 1995) was an American film actress and dancer.

== Biography ==
Bogard was born in San Francisco, California. She played the role of "Tomboy Taylor" in Fontaine Fox's Mickey McGuire film series from 1927 to 1933. After departing from the series, she became a dancer for stage and screen appearances.

In March 1939, Bogard was attacked and seriously injured by DeWitt Clinton Cook while on the campus of Los Angeles City College. Cook had also attacked several other women and murdered actress Margaret Campbell and Russian dancer Anya Sosoyeva. Cook was tried, convicted and executed in the San Quentin gas chamber in 1941.

In 1945, Bogard made a guest appearance as herself in the film Mickey the Great, a feature compilation of the Mickey McGuire short films, which paid tribute to the old Mickey McGuire series. She died in 1995 at age 74.

== See also ==
- Mickey McGuire
- Mickey Rooney
- Billy Barty
- Jimmy Robinson
