= Billy Barty =

American actor (1924–2000)

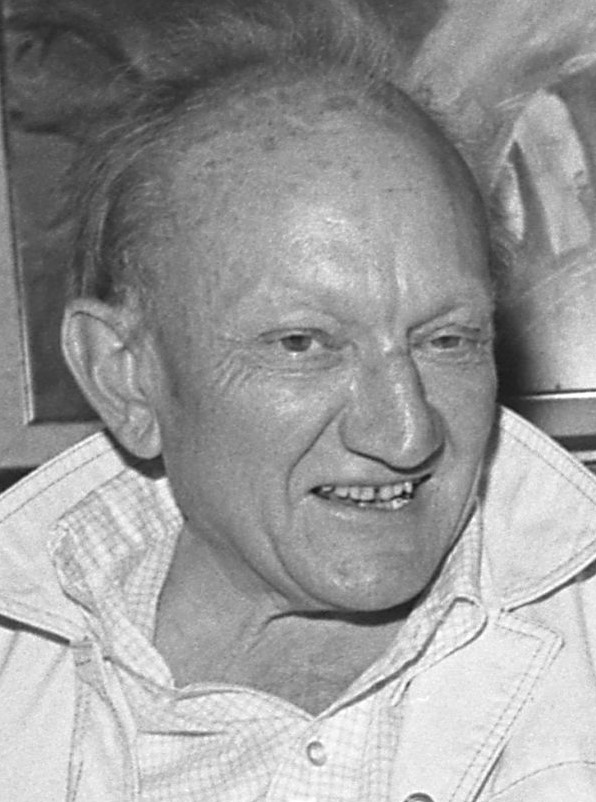
- Barty in 1976
- Born: William John Bertanzetti; October 25, 1924; Millsboro, Pennsylvania, U.S.
- Died: December 23, 2000 (aged 76); Glendale, California, U.S.
- Resting place: Forest Lawn Memorial Park, Hollywood Hills
- Occupations: Actor; activist
- Years active: 1927–2000
- Height: 3 ft 9 in (114 cm)
- Spouse: Shirley Bolingbroke (m. 1962)
- Children: 2, including Braden Barty

Billy Barty (born William John Bertanzetti; October 25, 1924 – December 23, 2000) was an American actor and activist. In adult life, he stood 3 ft 9 in (1.14 m) tall because of cartilage–hair hypoplasia dwarfism and so, was often cast in films opposite taller performers for comic effect. He specialized in outspoken or wisecracking characters. During the 1950s, he became a television actor, appearing regularly in the Spike Jones ensemble. In the early 1970s, he appeared often in a variety of roles in children's TV programs produced by Sid and Marty Krofft. As an activist for people with dwarfism, he founded the Little People of America organization in 1957.

== Early life ==
Barty was born October 25, 1924, in Millsboro, Pennsylvania, the son of Albert Steven and Ellen Cecial Bertanzetti. His paternal grandfather was Italian. The family moved to California in 1927. He had two sisters, Delores and Evelyn.

== Career ==
Barty co-starred with Mickey Rooney in the Mickey McGuire shorts, a comedy series of the 1920s and 1930s based on the Toonerville Folks comics. Small for his age even then, Barty would impersonate young children alongside brawny authority figures or wild animals, making these threats seem larger by comparison.

In the 1933 film Gold Diggers of 1933, a nine-year-old Barty appeared as a baby who escapes from his baby carriage. He also appeared as The Child in the 1933 film Footlight Parade. He is seen briefly in the 1935 film Bride of Frankenstein in an uncredited role as a baby in one of Dr. Pretorius' experiments, although his close-ups were cut from the film's final edit.

Much of Barty's film work consisted of bit parts and gag roles. He appeared in Fireman Save My Child (with Spike Jones), and also appeared in two Elvis Presley films, Roustabout (in one scene) and Harum Scarum, as a co-star without dialogue. In 1957, he appeared in the movie “The Undead” as The Imp.

Some of his more substantial film roles were as the elf Screwball in Legend; High Aldwin Junn, the village elder, in Willow alongside Warwick Davis; Gwildor, creator of the Cosmic Key, in the 1987 film Masters of the Universe; and as cameraman Noodles MacIntosh in "Weird Al" Yankovic's UHF. He also did a turn as J.J. MacKuen, the brash Bible salesman who is attacked by Goldie Hawn in 1978’s Foul Play.

=== Television ===
Barty appeared several times on The Dennis Day Show, including once as a leprechaun. Beginning in 1958, he played the pool hustler Babby, an occasional "information resource", in eight episodes of the Peter Gunn TV series. Barty starred in the Rawhide episode "Prairie Elephant" in 1961. He appeared in over a dozen episodes of The Spike Jones Show, performing as a singer, comedian, dancer and impressionist.

Barty also starred in a local Southern California children's show, Billy Barty's Bigtop, in the mid-1960s, which regularly showed The Three Stooges shorts. In one program, the Stooge Moe Howard visited the set as a surprise guest. The program gave many Los Angeles area children their first opportunity to become familiar with little people, till then little seen on the screen except as curiosities. He also appeared as a guest host on KTTV's Sheriff John's Lunch Brigade whenever "Sheriff John" Rovick was on vacation. Barty made regular appearances on The Red Skelton Hour during the mid-1960s.

Barty starred in full-body costumes in two children's television shows produced by Sid and Marty Krofft: as "Sparky the Firefly" in The Bugaloos from 1970 to 1972, and as "Sigmund" in Sigmund and the Sea Monsters from 1974 to 1976. Out of costume, he played the evil sidekick on the Kroffts' Dr. Shrinker from 1976 to 1977. He portrayed Toulouse Lautrec in the 1972 The Brady Bunch Saturday morning cartoons preview special The Brady Bunch Meet ABC's Saturday Superstars.

He was a regular cast member of the comedian Redd Foxx's variety show The Redd Foxx Show. Barty appeared in an episode of Barney Miller in 1977 and one of The Love Boat in 1978. He guest-starred in CHiPs, the final episode of Man from Atlantis ("Deadly Carnival"), and two episodes of Little House on the Prairie, playing first a circus member ("Annabelle"), then a single father trying to raise a baby daughter ("Little Lou"). Barty was regularly seen on Bizarre, a weekly Canadian TV sketch comedy series, airing from 1980 to 1985. In 1981, he appeared in a documentary called Being Different and in late 1985, he appeared as Rose Nylund's father in a dream sequence on an episode of The Golden Girls titled "A Little Romance". In 1972, Barty appeared in the second show of The Waltons, "The Carnival” as a carnival entertainer named Tommy Trimble. This would be the Waltons’ first contact with the outside world. On October 29, 1976, he appeared in the Paul Lynde Halloween Special as Gallows the Butler/and Pinky's boss, along with Margaret Hamilton reprising her role and dressed exactly as she looked in the musical fantasy film "The Wizard of Oz" (1939) as “The Wicked Witch of the West.”

In 1982, Barty appeared in an episode of Hart to Hart called "A Christmas Hart" (Season 4, Episode 10).

In 1983, Barty supplied the voice for "Figment" in Epcot's Journey Into Imagination dark ride. He briefly reprised the role in the ride's second version.

Barty was an annual guest-star on Canada's Telemiracle telethon, one of the most successful (per capita) telethons in the world.

Barty appeared on a 1976 episode of Celebrity Bowling paired with Dick Martin, defeating John Schuck and Michael Ansara, 120–118. He also appeared as himself in the 1981 documentary film Being Different.

=== Activism ===
Barty was a noted activist for the promotion of rights for others with dwarfism. He was disappointed with contemporary Hervé Villechaize's insistence that they were "midgets" instead of actors with dwarfism. Barty founded the Little People of America organization to help people with dwarfism in 1957 when he called upon other little people to join him in a get-together in Reno, Nevada. That original meeting of 21 people grew into Little People of America, a group which as of 2023 has more than 7,500 members. It was the first North American organization for little people.

=== Other ===
In 1981, Barty received a motion pictures star on the Hollywood Walk of Fame at 6922 Hollywood Boulevard for his contributions to the film industry.

In the 1980s, Barty owned a popular roller rink in Fullerton, California, that also booked bands on weekends.

In 1990, Barty was sued in small claims court by two of the writers of his cancelled comedy television series Short Ribbs, which aired for 13 weeks in the autumn of 1989 as a local program on KDOC-TV. Producer and writer William Winckler and writer Warren Taylor filed separate lawsuits against Barty for money owed, and Barty lost both cases. Barty claimed the lawsuit news was the most publicity he ever got, and compared it to similar press that celebrity Zsa Zsa Gabor received for slapping a Beverly Hills police officer.

A tribute book on Barty's life was published in December 2002. Within Reach: An Inspirational Journey into the Life, Legacy and Influence of Billy Barty was produced by Barty's nephew, Michael Copeland, and Copeland's wife, Debra.

== Personal life and death ==
In 1962, he married Shirley Bolingbroke of Malad City, Idaho. They had two children, Lori Neilson and TV/film producer and director Braden Barty.

Barty and his family were members of The Church of Jesus Christ of Latter-day Saints.

Barty died of heart failure in 2000, at age 76. He is entombed in Glendale's Forest Lawn Memorial Park.

== Filmography ==
=== Film ===
Year	Title	Role	Notes
1930	Soup to Nuts	Junior	Uncredited
1931	Daddy Long Legs	Billy	Uncredited
1931	Over the Hill	Shelby Boy	Uncredited
1933	Out All Night	Child	
1933	Gold Diggers of 1933	Baby	Uncredited
1933	Footlight Parade	Mouse, Little Boy	Uncredited
1933	Roman Scandals	Little Eddie	Uncredited
1933	Alice in Wonderland	White Pawn, Baby	Uncredited
1935	Bride of Frankenstein	Baby	Uncredited
1935	A Midsummer Night's Dream	Mustard Seed	
1937	Nothing Sacred	Ankle-Biting Boy	Uncredited
1946	Three Wise Fools	Bit	Uncredited
1950	Pygmy Island	Kimba	Uncredited
1953	The Clown	Billy	Uncredited
1954	Fireman Save My Child	Clarinetist	Uncredited
1957	The Undead	Imp	
1962	The Wonderful World of the Brothers Grimm	Court Jester	Uncredited
1964	Roustabout	Billy	Uncredited
1965	Harum Scarum	Baba	
1967	The Perils of Pauline	Pygmy Leader	Uncredited
1970	Pufnstuf	Googy Gopher, Orville Pelican	
1973	The Godmothers	Hawk	
1975	The Day of the Locust	Abe Kusich	
1975	Sixpack Annie	Pie Vendor	Uncredited
1976	W. C. Fields and Me	Ludwig	
1976	Won Ton Ton, the Dog Who Saved Hollywood	Assistant Director	
1976	The Amazing Dobermans	Samson	
1977	The Happy Hooker Goes to Washington	Little Man	
1978	Rabbit Test	Lester	
1978	Foul Play	J.J. MacKuen	
1978	The Lord of the Rings	Bilbo Baggins and Samwise Gamgee	Character Actor
1979	Firepower	Dominic Carbone	
1979	Skatetown, U.S.A.	Jimmy	
1980	Hardly Working	Sammy	
1981	Under the Rainbow	Otto Kriegling	
1984	Night Patrol	Captain Lewis	
1985	Legend	Screwball	
1986	Tough Guys	Philly	
1987	Body Slam	Tim McClusky	
1987	Rumpelstiltskin	Rumpelstiltskin	
1987	Snow White	Iddy	
1987	Masters of the Universe	Gwildor	
1987	Off the Mark	Little Russian	
1988	Willow	High Aldwin	
1989	UHF	Noodles	
1989	Lobster Man From Mars	Mr. Throckmorton	
1990	The Rescuers Down Under	Baitmouse (voice)	
1990	Wishful Thinking	Gypsy	
1990	Diggin' Up Business	Crosby	
1991	Life Stinks	Willy	
1992	The Naked Truth	Bellboy	
1994	Radioland Murders	Himself	
1998	An Alan Smithee Film: Burn Hollywood Burn	Himself	
2000	The Extreme Adventures of Super Dave	Funeral Eulogist	Uncredited
2001	I/O Error	Custodian	Short film

=== Television ===
Year	Title	Role	Notes
1954	The Spike Jones Show	Baby Spike / Squeeky / Abdulla the Villain / Liberace / Rumplestiltskin / Peter Cottontail / Figaro the Cat / other various	16 episodes
1957	Alfred Hitchcock Presents	George	Season 3 Episode 1: "The Glass Eye"
1958–1961	Peter Gunn	Babby	(1) Season 1 Episode 9: "The Man with the Scar" (1958) (2) Season 1 Episode 24: "The Ugly Frame" (1959) (3) Season 1 Episode 38: "The Portrait" (1959) (4) Season 2 Episode 10: "The Game" (1959) (5) Season 2 Episode 33: "Send a Thief" (1960) (6) Season 2 Episode 38: "Baby Shoes" (1960) (7) Season 3 Episode 17: "Blind Item" (1961) (8) Season 3 Episode 20: "A Kill and a Thief" (1961)
1961	Rawhide	Shorty	Season 4 Episode 8: "The Prairie Elephant"
1961	Thriller	Sam	Season 1 Episode 19: "Choose a Victim"
1964	The Alfred Hitchcock Hour	The Barker	Season 2 Episode 17: "The Jar"
1969	Get Smart	Marco	Season 5 Episode 2: "Ironhand"
1970	Get Smart	Upper Gemini	Season 5 Episode 24: "Hello Columbus - Goodbye America"
1970–1971	The Bugaloos	Sparky the Firefly	17 episodes
1972	The Waltons	Tommy Trimble (Tom Thumb)	Season 1 Episode 2: "The Carnival"
1973–1974	Sigmund and the Sea Monsters	Sigmund Ooze	Main role; 29 episodes
1975	The Lost Saucer	Hugo	Season 1 Episode 4: "Transylvania 2300"
1976	Dr. Shrinker	Hugo	16 episodes
1977	Barney Miller	Mr. Resnick	Season 3 Episode 17: "Sex Surrogate"
1978	The Love Boat	Ralph Warren	Season 2 Episode 11: "The Little People"
1978	Charlie's Angels	News Vendor	Season 3 Episode 10: "Angel On My Mind"
1979	CHiPs	James O'Hara	Season 3 Episode 6: "Counterfeit"
1979	Fantasy Island	Alphonse	Season 2 Episode 23: "Cornelius and Alphonse/The Choice"
1979	Little House on the Prairie	Owen	Season 6 Episode 5: "Annabelle"
1982	Little House on the Prairie	Lou Bates	Season 9 Episode 5: "Little Lou"
1983	Ace Crawford, Private Eye	Inch	Entire Season, 5 episodes.
1984	Trapper John, M.D.	Mort Cavanaugh	Season 5 Episode 14: "A Little Knife Music"
1985	The Golden Girls	Edgar Lingstrom	Season 1 Episode 13: "A Little Romance"
1985	Star Fairies	Troll (voice)	TV Special
1986	Wildfire	Dweedle (voice)	9 episodes
1986	ABC Weekend Special	Uncle Lester (voice)	Season 10 Episode 4: "The Mouse and the Motorcycle"
1987	DuckTales	King Brian (voice)	Season 1 Episode 7: "Luck o' the Ducks"
1988	ABC Weekend Special	Uncle Lester (voice)	Season 11 Episode 3: "Runaway Ralph"
1990	Adventures of the Gummi Bears	Nemo (voice)	Season 6 Episode 9: "A Recipe for Trouble"
1991	The Munsters Today	Genie	Season 3 Episode 14: "Genie from Hell"
1996	Frasier	Chris	Season 3 Episode 17: "High Crane Drifter"
1997	The New Batman Adventures	Hips McManus (voice)	Season 1 Episode 6: "Double Talk"
1999	L.A. Heat	Morty Feinberg	Season 2 Episode 15: "In Harm's Way"
