= Marvin Stephens =

American film actor (1922–2008)

- Born: March 23, 1922; Grants, New Mexico, United States
- Died: May 22, 2008 (aged 86)
- Occupation: Actor
- Years active: 1928-1942 (film)

Marvin R. Stephens (March 23, 1922 - May 22, 2008) was an American film actor. A child actor, his first Hollywood roles were in the Mickey McGuire films. Stephens then played the recurring role of Tommy McGuire in Twentieth Century Fox's Jones Family series of films.

== Selected filmography ==
- Borrowing Trouble (1937)
- Speed to Burn (1938)
- Love on a Budget (1938)
- Down on the Farm (1938)
- Safety in Numbers (1938)
- A Trip to Paris (1938)
- Quick Millions (1939)
- Fighting Thoroughbreds (1939)
- Everybody's Baby (1939)
- Young as You Feel (1940)
- Ride, Kelly, Ride (1941)
- Freckles Comes Home (1942)

== Bibliography ==
- Dwyer, Ruth. Malcolm St. Clair: His Films, 1915-1948. Scarecrow Press, 1996.
