= Jimmy Robinson (actor) =

American actor

- Born: James O. Robinson Jr. July 30, 1918; Los Angeles, California
- Died: November 2, 1967 (aged 49); California
- Occupation(s): Actor, entertainer
- Years active: 1927–1966

James O. Robinson Jr. (July 30, 1918 – November 2, 1967) was an American film actor.

== Early life ==
Robinson was born on 30 July 1918, in Los Angeles, California, as the son of James O. Robinson Sr.

== Career ==
He played the role of "Hambone" Johnson in Fontaine Fox's Mickey McGuire film series of short subjects. He was in the series from its beginning in 1927 until its end in 1934, appearing in most of the shorts in series. During his Mickey McGuire days, Robinson also appeared in other films, such as Tenderfeet and Penrod and Sam. After the McGuire series, Robinson continued to act, but mostly in bit parts.

== Death ==
Robinson died from an illness on 2 November 1967, at the age of 49, in his California home.

== Filmography ==
Year	Title	Role	Notes
1928	Tenderfeet		
1931	Penrod and Sam	Herman Washington	
1934	Mrs. Wiggs of the Cabbage Patch	Mose, Newspaper Office Boy	Uncredited
1935	On Probation	Negro Lad	Uncredited
1935	Becky Sharp	Sedley's Page	
1936	Anthony Adverse	Black Man	Uncredited
1937	A Day at the Races	Extra in Jazz Number	Uncredited
1938	The Buccaneer	Poster Boy	Uncredited
1938	Phantom Gold	Pancake	
1939	Long Shot	Tucky	
1940	South of Suez	Spying Native Boy	Uncredited
1940	The Lone Wolf Keeps a Date	Second Black Newsboy	Uncredited
1966	The Black Klansman	Barnaby	(final film role)

== See also ==
- Mickey McGuire (1927–1934)
- Mickey Rooney
- Billy Barty
- Delia Bogard
