= The Lighthouse by the Sea =

1924 film by Malcolm St. Clair

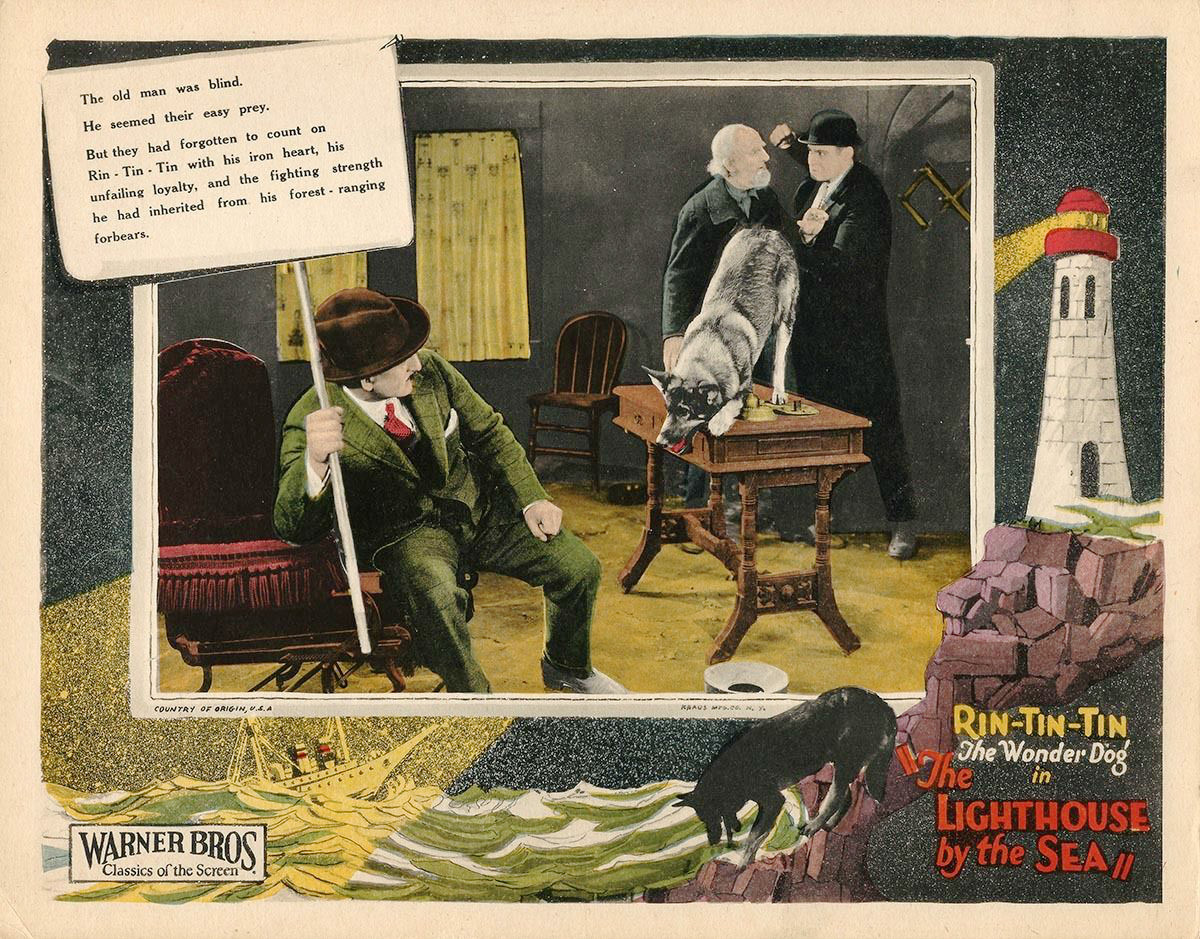
- Lobby card
- Directed by: Malcolm St. Clair; Clarence Kolster (assistant)
- Written by: Darryl F. Zanuck (credited as Gregory Rogers)
- Based on: The Lighthouse by the Sea by Owen Davis
- Starring: William Collier Jr. Rin Tin Tin
- Cinematography: H. Lyman Broening; Lee Garmes
- Production company: Warner Bros.
- Distributed by: Warner Bros.
- Release date: December 1, 1924
- Running time: 7 reels
- Country: United States
- Language: Silent (English intertitles)
- Budget: $91,000
- Box office: $330,000

The Lighthouse by the Sea is a 1924 American silent adventure film produced by and distributed by Warner Bros. The film's star is canine sensation Rin Tin Tin, the most famous animal actor of the 1920s. The film was directed by Malcolm St. Clair.

Full film

== Plot ==
As described in a review in a film magazine, shipwrecked off the coast of Maine, young Belgian Albert Dorn would have perished from exposure and the difficulties he encountered were it not for his dog Rin Tin Tin. When their little boat finally drifts to the shore, Flora Gale, daughter of the lighthouse keeper Caleb, rescues Albert. She has the job of keeping the light as the old man has gone blind and is worried that he will lose his job if this becomes known. Bootleggers operating in the vicinity scheme to extinguish the light on a certain night when they will discharge their cargo. They kidnap Albert, tying him up, and put a net around Rin Tin Tin, taking them out to the ship, and then attack the old man and put out the light. Rin Tin Tin chews his way out of the net, and then gnaws the ropes that bind Albert. After battling the crew, they make their way to shore. Edward Cavanna, leader of the bootleggers, and his pal Joe Dagget chain Albert, but he succeeds in setting fire to some waste so Rin Tin Tin can dash up the lighthouse with the burning waste, drop it into the light, and start it again. Flora has been kidnapped and taken to the boat. The old man frees Albert, and he and Rin Tin Tin get aboard the boat. They are battling to rescue Flora when a revenue cutter captures the ship. Albert finds happiness in Flora's love.

== Cast ==
- William Collier Jr. as Albert Dorn
- Rin Tin Tin as Rinty
- Louise Fazenda as Flora Gale
- Charles Hill Mailes as Caleb Gale
- Douglas Gerrard as Edward Cavanna
- Matthew Betz as Joe Dagget
- Joseph W. Girard as Inspector #1 (uncredited)
- Lew Harvey as Shifty Eye (uncredited)
- Texas Kid as Henchman (uncredited)

== Background and production ==
St. Clair had demonstrated skill in handling animals in two-reeler comedies for Mack Sennett Studios before directing Rin-Tin-Tin for Warner Bros. His 1919 Rip & Stitch Tailors and The Little Widow featured Teddy the Dog, a clever canine who engages in domestic duties and misadventures.

The Lighthouse by the Sea, “a melodramatic action-adventure,” is the second of back-to-back features starring Rin-Tin-Tin, first Find Your Man (1926) directed by St. Clair directed for Warner Bros. The movie was delivered ahead of schedule, in compliance with producer Jack L. Warner’s dictum, “I don’t want it good, I want it Tuesday.”

== Reception ==
Film critic Charles S. Sewell in a Moving Picture World review of the film provided fulsome praise for The Lighthouse by the Sea, based on the “thrilling stage melodrama” by Owen Davis. Conceding that some of canine hero Rin-Tin-Tin's “stunts” are “rather implausible,” Sewell declares that the picture “remains a melodrama of unbridled and primitive emotions…played up to the utmost.”

== Theme ==
The battle between uncooperative inanimate objects and humans featured in Buster Keaton’s The Blacksmith (1922), and co-directed by St. Clair, is revisited in Lighthouse By the Sea. Here the contest pits Rin-Tin-Tin against the temperamental mechanisms of the lighthouse, which the insightful canine masters and in turn serves to advance plot development. Film historian Ruth Anny Dwyer describes the picture as “an amalgam of a Keaton-like obstreperous machines and one of St. Clair’s intelligent dogs.”

As a melodramatic action-adventure, the scenario is reduced to a manichean formula: Good vs. evil, weak vs. strong, oppressed vs. oppressor.

== Box office ==
According to Warner Bros records the film earned $284,000 domestically and $46,000 in foreign markets.

== Preservation ==
The Lighthouse by the Sea survives today, with a print in the Library of Congress and several film archives around the world. It was transferred onto 16mm film by Associated Artists Productions in the 1950s and shown on television. It has also been issued on DVD.

For her thirteenth birthday, the Jewish diarist Anne Frank watched this film from a rented reel with an early projection machine along with her friends who thoroughly enjoyed it. Frank was a fan of Rin Tin Tin and mentioned this film in her diary in her second entry, on June 14, 1942.

== See also ==
- Rin Tin Tin
