= The Telephone Girl =

The Telephone Girl may refer to:

- The Telephone Girl (musical), an 1897 farce musical comedy play
- The Telephone Girl (serial), a 1924 lost film serial
- The Telephone Girl (1927 film), an American silent drama film
