= Malcolm St. Clair (filmmaker) =

Hollywood film director, writer, producer and actor (1897–1952)

- St. Clair, circa 1940, 20th Century Fox
- Born: May 17, 1897; Los Angeles, California
- Died: June 1, 1952 (aged 55); Pasadena, California
- Occupations: Film director, writer, producer, and actor
- Notable work: Yankee Doodle in Berlin; A Woman of the World

Malcolm St. Clair (May 17, 1897 – June 1, 1952) was a Hollywood film director, writer, producer and actor.

St. Clair's film career spanned the silent and sound era during the Hollywood Golden Age. His work is characterized by a “dynamic visual style” evident in all the genres he treated.

The zenith of St. Clair's filmmaking occurred during the silent film era, demonstrating his flexibility in wielding the medium as a director of comedies. His films included slapstick for Sennett, outrageous gag routines with Keaton and sophisticated comic-romances for Paramount.

His performance as a director declined with the advent of sound, suffering from the increased censorship, and his difficulty adapting to a less mobile camera and studio editing of his work. His later films were often limited to B movie “family” comedies, such as the Jones Family series, Lum and Abner and the later Laurel and Hardy features.

Most of St. Clair's silent films are lost or have limited access in archives.

== Career ==
=== Mack Sennett and Triangle studios: 1915-1921 ===
“Malcolm St. Clair’s gift crossed many comedic styles, from broad slapstick to the most sophisticated romantic comedy: he was a comic actor, a comic writer and a comic director. [H]is best work was marked by a combination of brilliant visual style and ironic wit.” - Film historian Ruth Anne Dwyer in Malcolm St. Claire: His Films, 1915-1948 (1996)

Malcolm St. Clair worked for a comedy movie producer Mack Sennett and Triangle-Keystone studio for five years “a period in which he established most of his basic film vocabulary he was to use throughout his entire career.”

At age 17, St. Clair was hired by the Los Angeles Express to draw sports caricatures. A former associate at the Express, Lige Conley, was performing as a Keystone Kop for Mack Sennett, and introduced St. Clair to actor Owen Moore who co-starred with Mabel Normand. Moore convinced producer Sennett that St. Clair, whose only demonstrable skill was drawing, would excel as a “gag” writer for the studio.

Sennett, on this specious recommendation, engaged St. Clair, and was quickly disabused: the teen—“thin and spindly”—St. Clair was provided a bit part as a Keystone Kop. Thus began his acting apprenticeship, performing often dangerous stunt work in the summer of 1915 during the filming of My Valet (1915), earning $3 per day. His fellow comedians included veteran actors Charlie Chaplin, Eddie Cline and Al St. John. St. Clair left the Keystone Kops in early 1916 under the auspices of Mabel Normand, joining the company of players who performed comic roles at Triangle studios. St. Clair appeared in 13 of these Sennett films, nine of which he was credited.

His first credited film was Dollars and Sense (1916), in which he was cast as “the Englishman.” His final role at Triangle was as “The Crown Prince" in Yankee Doodle in Berlin (1919) and its associated release The Mack Sennett Bathing Beauties in Why Beaches Are Popular(1919), in which represents a post-World War I comic “Teutonic heavy.” Between 1919 and 1921 St. Clair graduated to directing and made about two dozen 2-reel comedies for Sennett, inventing some of the characteristic gag routines.

His first directing credit was Rip & Stitch Tailors (1919).

=== Keaton-St. Clair collaborations: 1921-1922 ===
Near the end of his employment by Sennett, St. Clair co-directed two pictures with comic actor and filmmaker Buster Keaton: The Goat (1921) and The Blacksmith (1922). Keaton's approach to cinematic comedy integrated the “gag” scenes with the thematic elements of the story. St. Clair adopted Keaton's methods in his future films: “the humor in his work stems from well-constructed gags which are connected to each other and/or to the central plot line, a comic style refined while working with Buster Keaton.”

=== Warner Bros. 1924-1925 ===
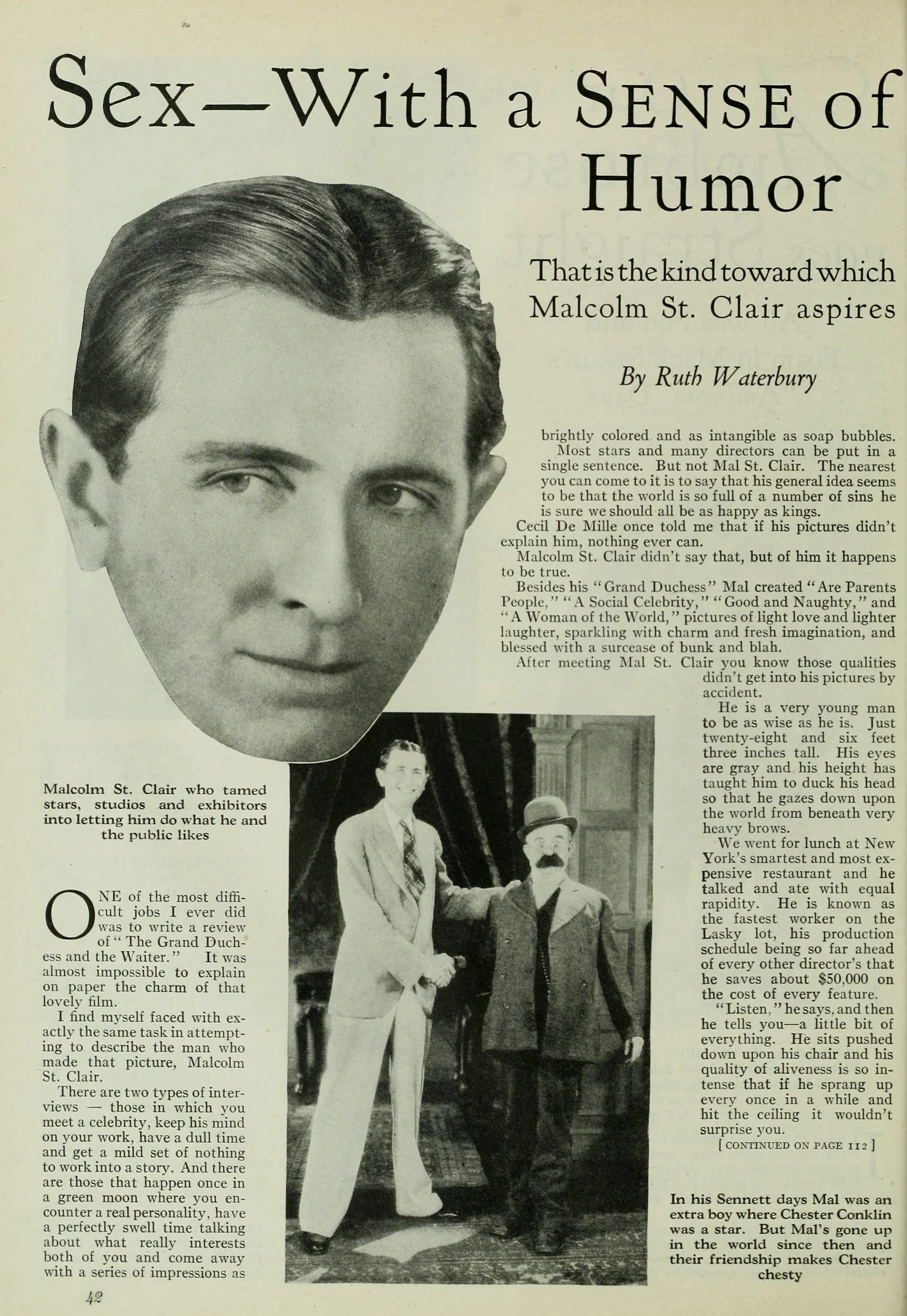
Malcolm St. Clair Photoplay magazine, 1926

The 25-year-old Mal St. Clair directed The Telephone Girl in a flurry of activity in late 1923 and early 1924. St. Clair signed in December 1923 with FBO to direct the series to begin filming in February 1924. Warner Bros. studios, which had been impressed with his Fighting Blood series for FBO, enlisted St. Clair to make his first feature film, George Washington, Jr., which he shot in the month of January 1924, then returned to FBO to complete his contract for The Telephone Girl.

Biographer Ruth Anne Dwyer notes that St. Clair's love of boxing is “reflected in the remarkable number of films he made about the sport: seventeen.”

Photographer Lee Garmes acted as cameraman on both the Fighting Blood and The Telephone Girl series and later followed St. Clair to Warner Bros. and then Paramount Pictures where he would win Academy Awards for his cinematography.

After completing a Rin Tin Tin feature Find Your Man and the crime drama On Thin Ice, both 1924, Warner Bros. terminated St. Clair despite the box office successes of the pictures.

=== Columbia pictures ===
After his dismissal from the “budget conscious” Warner Bros. studios, St. Clair was engaged by Columbia Pictures - at that time considered a “Poverty Row” studio - to direct After Business Hours (1925). A “society drama,” this lost film was well received by reviewers. After Business Hours first appeared in a 71-minute version, the picture was re-released after editing to 56 minutes. The shorter version was profitable, and its “artistic and financial success” garnered the attention of Paramount Picture executives.

St. Clair was noted for providing a relaxed and supportive production unit, which contributed to his popularity among actors and technicians. A measure of “clowning” and “high jinks” as well as intramural baseball games “stimulated the cheerful atmosphere necessary to the comic mood of his films.”

=== Paramount Pictures: 1926-1929 ===
“The Paramount films can realistically be described as the peak of St. Clair’s career, a time when he was twice voted by film critics from the major cinema journals as being one of the best directors in America.” - Film historian Ruth Anne Dwyer in Malcolm St, Clair: His Films, 1915-1948 (1996)

St. Clair's 1925 After Business Hours, filmed for Columbia Pictures was both a financial and critical success. In 1925 Paramount executives placed the 28-year-old filmmaker under contract.

St. Clair's tenure at Paramount would be “the most important phase of his career.” Film historian Ruth Anne Dwyer observes:

[T]he films for which St. Clair became noted were the sophisticated comedies which he made for Paramount in the 1920s; these have the light, oblique touch most often associated with Ernst Lubitsch.

==== St. Clair and Louise Brooks contretemps ====
St. Clair directed a number of screen stars of the silent era while under contract to Paramount among them Pola Negri, Florence Vidor, Esther Ralston, Tom Moore, Adolphe Menjou, Clara Bow and Louise Brooks. In a 1989 interview with biographer Barry Paris, Brooks denounced St. Clair, who had directed her in three Paramount feature films, alleged that he was an incompetent and a drunkard. Ruth Anne Dwyer, in her research for a 1996 biography on St. Clair, could find no corroboration for Brooks’ claims, concluding that her “unpleasant assessment of St. Clair's directing technique [was] highly inaccurate.” Dwyer adds that her own account “should correct any misconceptions caused by Brooks’ assertions.”

Despite professional friction, the director and the actress maintained a friendly relationship. In John Kobal's book of interviews, People Will Talk, Brooks described St. Clair as "a charming man, a lovely man." Around the time of the filming of The Show Off, St. Clair drew two caricatures of Brooks, both of which were published in magazines and newspapers.

=== Transition to sound ===
St. Clair struggled to adapt to sound technology with the establishment of the new technology in 1930 in the United States. St. Clair's performance as a director declined, suffering from the increased censorship, and his difficulty adapting to a less mobile camera and studio editing of his work. He made a handful of pictures during the early 1930s at various studios, including MGM, (Montana Moon, Remote Control), Paramount (Dangerous Nan McGrew), Universal (The Boudoir Diplomat), Fox (Olsen's Night Out), and RKO (Goldie Gets Along).

=== 20th Century Fox ===
St. Clair joined 20th Century-Fox in 1936 and served with the studio for 12 years. He directed an assortment of comedies and dramas, including the Jones Family series of domestic comedies and a Milton Berle feature. He also accepted freelance assignments, including two Lum and Abner features. Mal St. Clair is perhaps best known in his late career as the director of four Laurel and Hardy comedies, released by Fox between June 1943 and May 1945.

Fox closed its B unit in December 1944, leaving St. Clair inactive until 1948, when he directed two low-budget features for Fox release. In 1950, he wanted to direct Buster Keaton in a television series, but ill health prevented him from directing again.

Malcolm St. Clair died on June 1, 1952, at age 55.

St. Clair’s directing career ended as it had begun, with lesser known actors in unpretentious films with moderate budgets. The highlights of his career, the silent work at which he became so adept, lie forgotten.”

=== Camera technique and style ===
Adolphe Menjou

Louise Brooks

Pola Negri

Chester Conklin

St. Clair was noted for using an array of “signature” camera shots as cinematic devices with which to tell a story, among these the “back shot” and “hand and foot shot.” In addition, highly compressed sequences of facial close-ups in reaction to one another or an event are widely identified as characteristic of St. Clair's story-telling method.

==== ”Back shot” device ====
A camera shot notable in St. Clair's oeuvre, this cinematic technique presents an actor engaged in some action, but facing away from the audience or perhaps another character in the frame and, as such, concealing the subject's true behavior or condition. The subject is then suddenly revealed, disabusing the audience of their momentary misapprehension. Film historian Ruth Anne Dwyer explains that the function of these shots serve to “fool” the observer and was “a recognizable St. Clair ‘signature.’”

Dwyer offers as an example from Canary Murder Case (1929) in which ‘Canary’ Odell (Louise Brooks) is viewed through a keyhole, seated with her back to the camera, a lighted cigarette visible in her hand: evidently alive, she has actually just been murdered.

==== ”Hand and Foot” shots ====
The purpose of these “hand and foot” shots is to reveal the emotional state of a character, as well as to advance the narrative.

Close-ups of hands or feet may reveal the social and economic status of the subject in a St. Clair film: the bejeweled hands of a woman clutches a packet of letters, opens one briefly, then discards them all into a waste basket (Are Parents People? (1925)). A woman's feet clad in elegant evening slippers are shown pacing up and down, then stamping violently: the camera cuts to a trembling chandelier on the ceiling of the room below in (The Grand Duchess and the Waiter (1926))

Dwyer observes that this “hand and foot” device was widely used by St. Clair's contemporaries, among them Ernst Lubitsch and Alfred Hitchcock, serving as a means to paint “a psychological portrait of their owner.” Dwyer adds that “St. Clair had been using this technique since 1920 and it is possible that other filmmakers may have borrowed it from St. Clair.”

==== Rapidly spaced close-ups ====
St. Clair began using a technique of “close-ups in close succession,” where actor's expressive faces appear to communicate with one another, providing insights into their relationship. A notable application from Gentlemen Prefer Blondes (1928) presents “a rapidly spaced exchange of glances between the heroines [Ruth Taylor and Alice White], each of the shots reflecting a change of mood or expression.”

St. Clair used this device successfully in his boxing-themed films, including Knockout Reilly (1927).

== Filmography ==
=== Actor ===
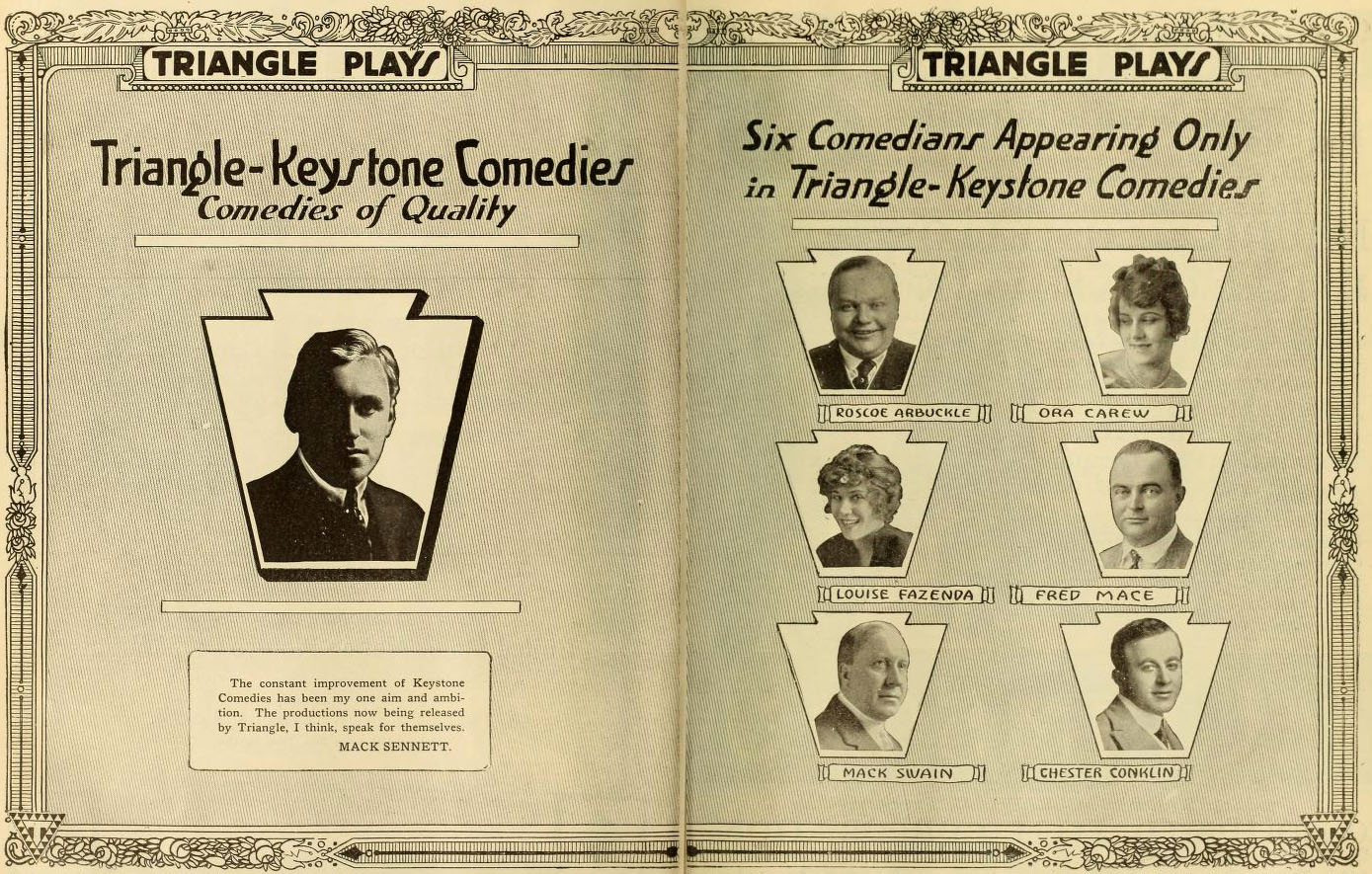
Triangle Keystone

Note: All films as actor were made at Triangle-Keystone studios.

- My Valet (1915)
- Dollars and Sense (1916)
- A la Cabaret (1916)
- His Bitter Pill (1916)
- Her Circus Knight (1917)
- “The Camera Cure” (1917)
- Cactus Nell (1917)
- His Perfect Day (1917)
- An Innocent Villain (1917)
- Their Domestic Deception (1917)
- His Baby Doll (1917)
- Lost - A Cook (1917)
- Yankee Doodle in Berlin (1919)

=== Director ===
Film studios are listed next to each film title.

=== Silent films ===
1919

- Rip & Stitch Tailors - Triangle-Keystone
- The Little Widow - Triangle-Keystone
- No Mother to Guide Him - Triangle-Keystone

1920

- He Loved Like He Lied - Rainbow/ Universal
- Young Man's Fancy - Triangle-Keystone
- A Kitchen Cinderella - Triangle-Keystone
- Welcome Home - Reelcraft

1921

- Wedding Bells Out of Tune - Triangle-Sennett
- Sweetheart Days - Triangle-Sennett
- The Goat - Buster Keaton Productions
- The Night Before - Fox Film
- Call a Cop - Triangle-Keystone
- Bright Eyes - Triangle-Keystone

1922

- The Blacksmith - Comique Film Corporation/First National Pictures|
- Rice and Old Shoes - /Robertson-Cole Corp.
- Their First Vacation - Robertson-Cole
- Entertaining the Boss - Robertson-Cole
- Christmas - Robertson-Cole
- Keep ‘em Home - Robertson-Cole

1923

- Fighting Blood - FBO

1924

- George Washington, Jr. - Warner Bros.
- The Telephone Girl - FBO
- Find Your Man - Warner Bros.
- The Lighthouse by the Sea - Warner Bros.

1925

- On Thin Ice - Warner Bros.
- After Business Hours - Columbia Pictures
- Are Parents People? - Famous Players-Lasky
- The Trouble with Wives - Famous Players-Lasky
- A Woman of the World - Famous Players-Lasky

1926

- The Grand Duchess and the Waiter - Paramount
- A Social Celebrity - Paramount
- Good and Naughty - Paramount
- The Show-Off - Paramount
- The Popular Sin - Paramount

1927

- Knockout Reilly - Paramount
- Breakfast at Sunrise - Paramount

1928

- Gentlemen Prefer Blondes - Paramount
- Sporting Goods - Paramount
- Beau Broadway - Metro-Goldwyn-Meyer
- The Fleet's In - Paramount

1929

- The Canary Murder Case - Paramount
- Welcome Danger - RKO Pictures
- Side Street - RKO

=== Sound films ===
1929

- Night Parade - RKO

1930

- Montana Moon - Metro-Goldwyn-Meyer
- Dangerous Nan McGrew - Paramount
- Remote Control - Metro-Goldwyn-Meyer

1931

- The Boudoir Diplomat - Universal

1933

- Olsen's Night Out - Fox Film
- Goldie Gets Along - RKO
- Time Out for Romance - Metro-Goldwyn-Meyer

1936

- Crack-Up - 20th Century Fox

1937

- Dangerously Yours - Metro-Goldwyn-Meyer
- She Had to Eat - 20th Century Fox
- Meet the Missus - Republic Pictures
- Born Reckless - 20th Century Fox

1938

- A Trip to Paris - 20th Century Fox
- Safety in Numbers - 20th Century Fox
- Down on the Farm - 20th Century Fox
- Everybody's Baby - 20th Century Fox

1939

- The Jones Family in Hollywood - 20th Century Fox
- Quick Millions - 20th Century Fox
- Hollywood Cavalcade - Paramount

1940

- Young as You Feel - 20th Century Fox

1942

- The Bashful Bachelor - RKO
- The Man in the Trunk - 20th Century Fox
- Over My Dead Body - 20th Century Fox

1943

- Two Weeks to Live - RKO
- Jitterbugs - 20th Century Fox
- The Dancing Masters - 20th Century Fox

1944

- Swing Out the Blues - Columbia Pictures
- The Big Noise - 20th Century Fox

1945

- The Bullfighters - 20th Century Fox

1948

- Arthur Takes Over - 20th Century Fox
- Fighting Back - 20th Century Fox

=== References ===
- Dwyer, Ruth Anne. 1996. Malcolm St. Clair: His Films, 1915-1948. The Scarecrow Press, Lantham, Md., and London. ISBN 0-8108-2709-3

=== External links ===
- Malcolm St. Clair at IMDb
- Malcolm St. Clair at Virtual History
- Photo of Mal St. Clair with writer Anita Loos and actress Ruth Taylor.
- Mal St. Clair photo gallery(ACertainCinema.com)
