= Pierre Collings =

American screenwriter (1902–1937)

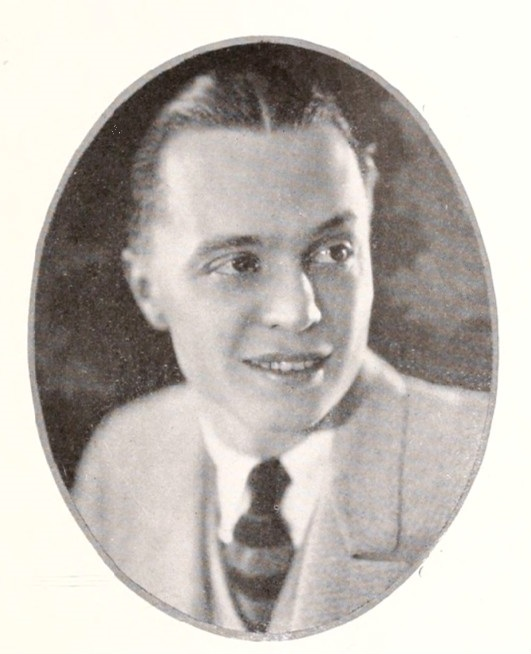
Collings in 1926

Lysander Pierre Collings (September 22, 1902 - December 21, 1937), known professionally as Pierre Collings, was a writer and filmmaker who, along with Sheridan Gibney, won two Academy Awards in 1936 for The Story of Louis Pasteur. Their screenplay was adapted from their own work, leading to awards for both Best Adapted Screenplay and Best Story.

== Career ==
Collings started in the motion picture industry at 17 as a messenger boy and worked as a cameraman before becoming known for his writing.

He wrote a number of screenplays in the mid-late 1920s and although he was less active and suffered from a number of personal issues in the 1930s, it was then that his best known work was released. The Story of Louis Pasteur was nominated for Best Picture and won Best Actor for Paul Muni, in addition to winning Best Story and Best Adapted Screenplay for Collings and Gibney. Unusually, the pair won Best Adapted Screenplay for adapting their own work. The Best Story category was discontinued in 1957 in favor of Best Original Screenplay.

== Personal life ==
Collings was born in Nova Scotia, Canada to American parents, Francis and Olive Collings.

In 1926 he married Natalie Harris. The couple divorced in 1930.

He was arrested for drunk driving in August 1935, a few months before starting work on The Story of Louis Pasteur. Then, while working on the screenplay, his mother died unexpectedly, and upon its completion he suffered a nervous breakdown. He was not in attendance at the Academy Awards ceremony to receive his two awards. Unable to secure much work after Louis Pasteur, Collings started drinking heavily and eventually fell into poverty.

He died of pneumonia at the age of 35 in North Hollywood, California. At the time he was working on a screenplay with songwriter Carrie Jacobs Bond. The Los Angeles Times attributed his death to "heartache and despair" due to lack of work.

Both of Collings's Academy Awards have been lost. One was found after his death in a hotel closet full of items kept by the hotel as collateral when guests did not pay in advance. Actor Charles McKay, who found it, and screenwriter Arthur Caesar returned the award to the academy, but today the academy does not have a record of what happened to it. Collings is rumored to have pawned the other.

== Selected filmography ==
- Untamed Youth (1924)
- A Woman of the World (1925)
- The Grand Duchess and the Waiter (1926)
- A Social Celebrity (1926)
- Good and Naughty (1926)
- The Show Off (1926)
- Knockout Reilly (1927)
- Time to Love (1927)
- The Red Dance (1928)
- The Hole in the Wall (1929)
- Dangerous Nan McGrew (1930)
- Animal Crackers (1930)
- The Story of Louis Pasteur (1936)
