= The Telephone Girl (serial) =

1922 film

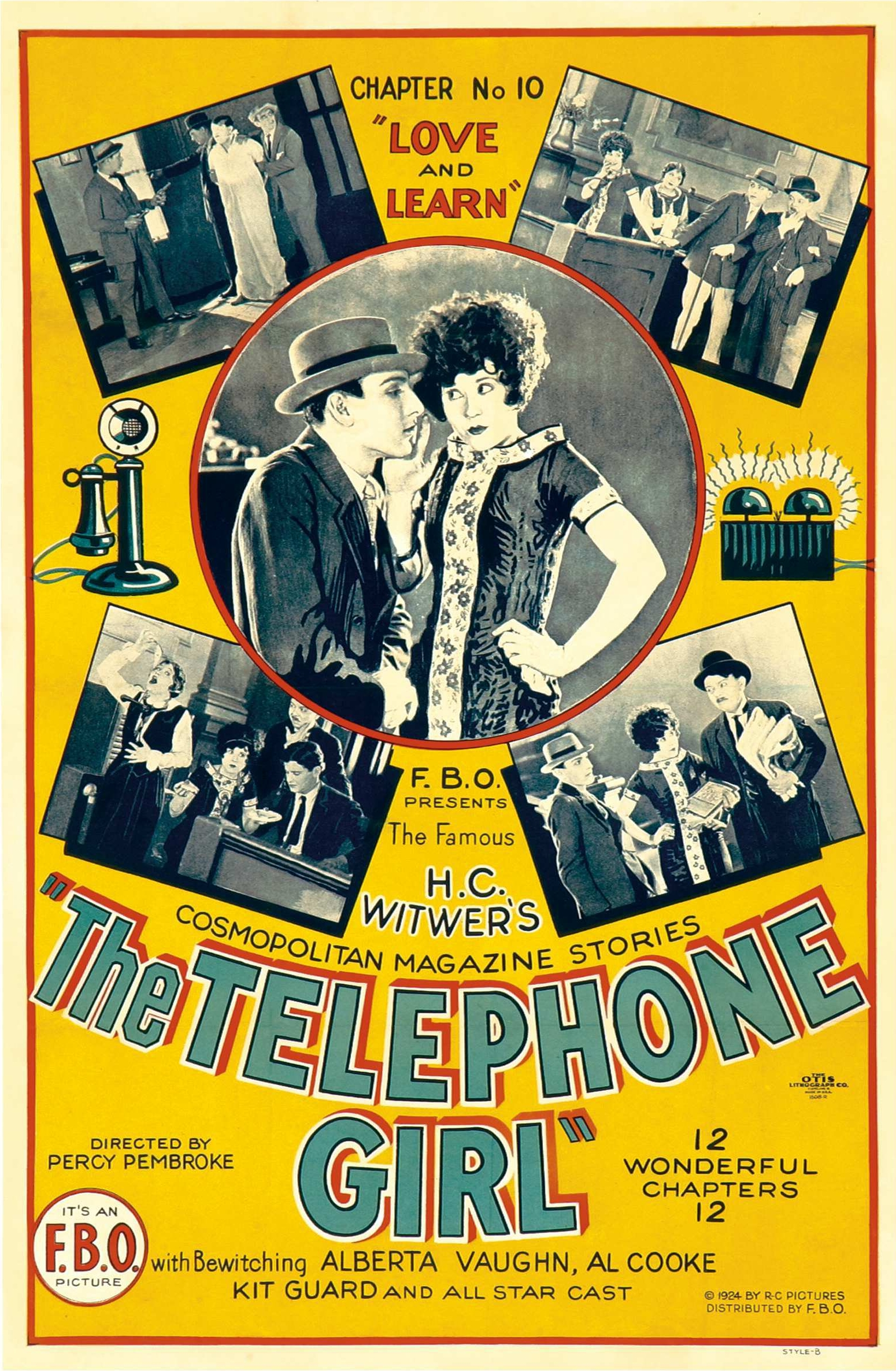
- Poster from the 10th serial
- Directed by: Mal St. Clair, Asst. director Pandro Berman
- Screenplay by: Darryl F. Zanuck and George F. Marion
- Based on: stories by H.C. Witwer
- Starring: Alberta Vaughn
- Cinematography: Lee Garmes
- Production company: FBO
- Release date: 1924
- Country: United States
- Language: English

The Telephone Girl was a lost film serial produced in 12 2-reel episodes based on stories by H.C. Witwer and released by FBO studios in 1924.

The first seven of the episodes were directed by Malcolm St. Clair and the screenplays were written by George F. Marion and Darryl F. Zanuck.

Alberta Vaughn portrays the “single-minded and feisty” telephone operator in the series.

== Series background ==
Each episode opens at the fictional Hotel St. Moe, set in New York City, which is patronized by members of a sporting club. The hotel operator - “the telephone girl” - overhears “astonishing things” while she transfers calls, from which often emerge the narratives. A total of twelve episodes of The Telephone Girl were produced, and released in 1924.

The first seven of the episodes, all of which were directed by Malcolm St. Clair, are listed below with the title and a brief plot sketch.

== Series synopsis ==
Julius Sees Her (12 February 1924)

English actors of the Grand stage circuit register at the Hotel St. Moe. Leading man Douglas Gerrard is exposed as a pompous phony.

When Knighthood was in Tower (5 March 1924)

A struggling playwright’s hotel bill is in arrears and he faces eviction. Gladys introduces him to a producer, who reads his script, but finds the plot unbelievable. Truth proves to be stranger than fiction when life imitates art, convincing the producer to stage the now demonstrable scenario.

Money to Burns (30 March 1924)

In an effort to discover plot ideas for a new play, a writer offers Jimmy the bellhop $10,000 for the privilege of observing his daily routine. Jimmy obliges, and gets into various difficulties. Director Malcolm St. Clair, former Keystone Kop, plays an intoxicated gentleman.

Sherlock’s Home (3 April 1924)

Gladys the telephone girl has a crush on a prizefighter. Jerry the house detective, who is also sweet on Gladys, shares front row seats with her at one the pugilist's matches. Jealous, the prizefighter arrives at the hotel to discipline Jerry, but the boxer’s wife arrives and administers a beating on her husband.

King Leary (17 April 1924)

The action is set on a cruise ship bound for Paris. An actor dressed up as an elderly chaperone, is repeatedly discovered in embarrassing social situations. A bully prizefighter, nicknamed King Leary, is taught a lesson.

William Tells (24 April 1924)

Two young actresses discover that their acting troupe has gone bankrupt after they arrive in Paris. At their hotel, the girls encounter a handsome young man who expresses a desire to cast them in a major film production which he will finance. He turns out to be a former waiter at the hotel.

For the Love of Mike (5 May 1924)

Upon arriving back in New York City after their adventures in Paris, Gladys helps Mike, a superstitious prizefighter, to overcome his anxiety about fighting in his 13th bout. Jerry the house detective and Jimmy the bellhop serve as Mike’s manager and trainer, and with Gladys’ encouragement, the nervous boxer prevails. Actor Ford Sterling makes a cameo appearance.

== Cast ==
- Alberta Vaughn as Gladys Murgatroyd (the telephone operator)
- Gertrude Short as Sadie (Gladys’ friend)
- Kit Guard as Jerry the hotel manager/house detective
- Al Cooke as Jimmy the bellboy

Note: Each episode has a new leading man. Among these were George O'Hara and Eric St. Clair.

== Production ==
The 25-year-old Mal St. Clair directed The Telephone Girl in a flurry of activity in late 1923 and early 1924. St. Clair signed in December 1923 with FBO to direct the series to begin filming in February 1924. Warner Bros. studios, which had been impressed with his Fighting Blood series for FBO, enlisted St. Clair to make his first feature film, George Washington, Jr., which he shot in the month of January 1924, then returned to FBO to complete his contract for The Telephone Girl.

Photographer Lee Garmes acted as cameraman on both the Fighting Blood and The Telephone Girl series and later followed St. Clair to Warner Bros. and then Paramount Pictures where he would win Academy Awards for his cinematography.
