= Actor's and Sin =

1952 film by Ben Hecht and Lee Garmes

Actors and Sin
- Directed by: Ben Hecht; Lee Garmes
- Written by: Ben Hecht
- Produced by: Ben Hecht
- Starring: Edward G. Robinson; Eddie Albert; Marsha Hunt
- Narrated by: Dan O'Herlihy; Ben Hecht
- Cinematography: Lee Garmes
- Edited by: Otto Ludwig
- Music by: George Antheil
- Color process: Black and white
- Production company: Sid Kuller Productions
- Distributed by: United Artists
- Release date: May 29, 1952 (New York)
- Running time: 86 minutes
- Country: United States
- Language: English
- Budget: $127,000

Actors and Sin (screen title: Actor's and Sin) is a 1952 American comedy film written, produced and directed by Ben Hecht. The film marks Edward G. Robinson's second film with actress Marsha Hunt. It is also known by its section names of "Actor's Blood" and "Woman of Sin". Lee Garmes was codirector and cinematographer, as he was on most of the films that Hecht directed.

== Plot ==
The film lampoons the Hollywood motion-picture industry and is separated into two sections.

=== Actor's Blood ===
In New York. Broadway star Marcia Tillayou has been found shot dead in her apartment. Her father Maurice is also an actor and had watched her theater career rise as his own declined. She had let success overcome her, and had thus alienated critics, fans, producers and her playwright husband. She experienced several stage flops before being murdered.

=== Woman of Sin ===
In Hollywood. Dishonest writers' agent Orlando Higgens has been receiving frantic calls from Daisy Marcher about a screenplay that she had written titled Woman of Sin. Thinking they are crank calls, Higgens tells her to never again call his office. He then learns that because of a mail mixup, her screenplay had been received by film mogul J.B. Cobb, a man who had once passed on Gone With the Wind based on Higgins' advice. Cobb thinks that Higgins sent the script and offers him a lucrative sum for the rights. However, Higgins does not know where Daisy is or that she is actually a nine-year-old child.

== Cast ==
=== Actor's Blood ===
- Edward G. Robinson as Maurice Tillayou
- Marsha Hunt as Marcia Tillayou
- Dan O'Herlihy as Alfred O'Shea, Narrator
- Rudolph Anders as Otto Lachsley
- Alice Key as Miss Thompson, Tommy
- Rick Roman as Clyde Veering
- Peter Brocco as Frederick Herbert
- Elizabeth Root as Mrs. Herbert
- Joseph Mell as George Murray
- Irene Martin as Mrs. Murray
- Herb Bernard as Emile
- Robert Carson as Thomas Hayne

=== Woman of Sin ===
- Ben Hecht as Narrator
- Eddie Albert as Orlando Higgens
- Alan Reed as Jerome (J.B.) Cobb
- Tracey Roberts as Miss Flannigan
- Paul Guilfoyle as Mr. Blue
- Douglas Evans as Mr. Devlin
- Jody Gilbert as Mrs. Egelhofer
- George Baxter as Vincent Brown
- George Keymas as Bill Sweitzer, Producer
- Toni Carroll as Millicent, Movie Star
- John Crawford as Gilbert, Movie Hero
- Kathleen Mulqueen as Miss Wright
- Alan Mendez as Captain Moriarity
- Sam Rosen as Joseph Danello
- Jenny Hecht as Millicent Egelhofer, Daisy Marcher
- Cameo appearances by:
- Betty Field, Louis B. Mayer, and Jack L. Warner

== Release ==
Prior to the film's release, several theater chains refused to screen the film because it lampoons the film industry. This resulted in a $250,000 lawsuit by United Artists and Sid Kuller Productions against the ABC Theatres Company. The Beverly Canon Theater in Beverly Hills, California was specifically targeted for having canceled an existing agreement to rent the film for exhibition beginning on July 24, 1952. However, the film opened as planned at the theater on July 24.

== Reception ==
In a contemporary review for The New York Times, critic Howard Thompson characterized the stories as "an almost reverential close-up of a stage actor's senile egomania and an atomically conceived blast at front-office intellectuality in the film factories" and wrote: "'Actor's Blood' is a stiff, glum and narcissistic tale ... the whole episode flounders midway between a conversational seance and a straight farce. 'Woman of Sin' is straight farce, with an idea so devastatingly impudent that only Mr. Hecht could claim it."

Critic Edwin Schallert of the Los Angeles Times wrote: "Chiefly this film may be discerned as an oddity in movie-making and its satire on Hollywood, much publicized, can hardly be construed as offensive even by the greatest devotee of the picture industry, because it deals with an era admittedly dated and quite definitely that."

In the New York Daily News, reviewer Dorothy Masters wrote: "'Woman of Sin' is a practically flawless satire, superbly cast, brilliantly written, masterfully directed and loaded with comedy. ... 'Actor's Blood' has many good lines and a spectacular plot, but falls down in presentation."

In The Boston Globe, critic Marjory Adams wrote that the legal row "would indicate that producers have no sense of humor or that the satire struck home too forcibly" and the first story "may prove too macabre for some tastes" but "'Woman of Sin' is completely delightful in its barbed humour [sic]"
