= The Grand Duchess and the Waiter =

1926 film

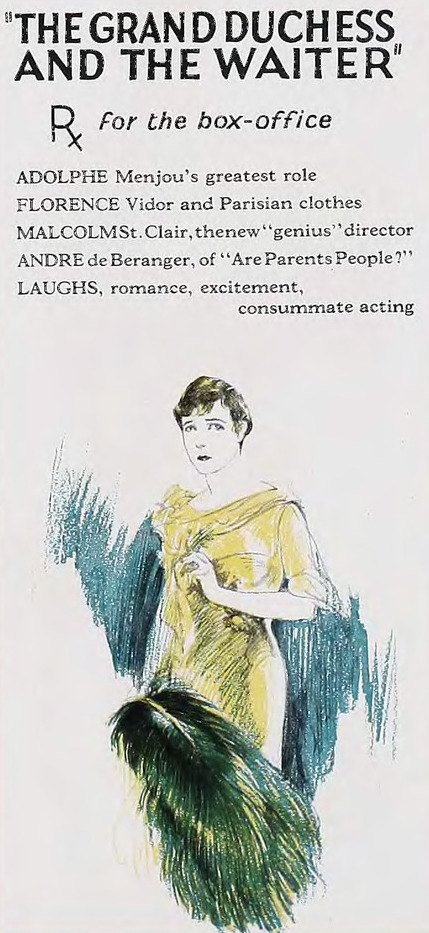
- Advertisement
- Directed by: Malcolm St. Clair
- Written by: John Lynch (scenario)
- Based on: La Grande-duchesse et le garcon d'etage by Alfred Savoir
- Produced by: Adolph Zukor; Jesse L. Lasky
- Starring: Florence Vidor; Adolphe Menjou
- Cinematography: Lee Garmes
- Distributed by: Paramount Pictures
- Release date: February 8, 1926
- Running time: 70 minutes 7 reels (6,314 feet)
- Country: United States
- Language: Silent (English intertitles)

The Grand Duchess and the Waiter is a 1926 American silent romantic comedy film directed by Mal St. Clair and starring Florence Vidor and Adolphe Menjou. A “sophisticated comedy,” this Paramount production is based on a stage play by Alfred Savoir entitled La Grande-duchesse et le garcon d'etage (1924).

== Plot ==
A Russian Grand Duchess, Xenia has taken rooms in a lavish Paris hotel, an emigré fleeing the Bolshevik Revolution. She begins selling her jewels to maintain her lifestyle. The wealthy Albert Belfort is attracted to the duchess, but official protocol prohibits him from approaching a member of royalty without proper introductions of which none of his associates can provide. Infatuated with her, he resorts to posing as a floor-waiter assigned to her suite—the duties of which he is utterly ignorant. His ineptitude offends the duchess and her royal entourage. To punish him, she makes him a member of her cortege, and assigns him to very menial labor. The duchess, however, finally falls in love with him but is forced to repulse him when others of the royal party find her in the waiter’s arms after she has swooned. Months later, Belfort is despondently searching for the duchess, after he has rescued the last of her jewels. He finds Xenia, now the proprietor of a humble inn, and they are reunited in mutual love.

== Cast ==
- Adolphe Menjou as Albert Durant
- Florence Vidor as The Grand Duchess Zenia
- Lawrence Grant as The Grand Duke Peter
- George Beranger as The Grand Duke Paul (billed as Andre Beranger)
- Dot Farley as The Countess Prascovia Avaloff
- Barbara Pierce as Henriette
- Brandon Hurst as Matard
- William Courtright as Blake

== Reception ==
Exhibitors Herald in its December 19, 1925 edition termed the film “a fast, frisky, gorgeously dressed comedy” with attractive portrayals of the lead protagonists by Menjou and Vidor and based on “a charming and original comedy by Alfred Savoir.”

== Style ==
The style applied with The Grand Duchess and the Waiter is representative of those favored by Paramount in its “sophisticated romantic comedies.” According to film historian Ruth Anne Dwyer:

The Duchess has the glossy, polished finish of later musicals, a patina in keeping with an urban and upscale sophisticated style. Such conventions were in perfect keeping with the Jazz Age: money and love were important, and style was everything.

In these “thin” storylines, that provided little in the way of character development, the style and the “look” of the movie served as a substitute for substance. The “oblique” approach developed to create this effect is often termed the “light”’ or Lubitsch touch, associated with Paramount director Ernst Lubitsch, of which St. Clair skillfully applies in The Duchess and the Waiter. Dwyer reminds readers that the comedic devices St. Clair employs in The Duchess are Keatonesque, in particular resembling Keaton’s The Blacksmith (1922), which St. Clair co-directed.

Just as the young blacksmith (Keaton) is entirely at odds with his panoply of tools, “Adolphe Menjou’s waiter’s tray and tea equipment seem to conspire against him: he bungles everything and cannot manipulate the cream pitcher, spilling it down the Grand Duchess’ neck.” Unlike the cursed blacksmith, the waiter achieves his aims, and wins the love of the royal Xenia.

== Home media ==
The film has been issued on VHS but has yet to see a DVD release.

== See also ==
- The House That Shadows Built (1931 promotional film by Paramount with excerpt of this film)
