= The Story of Louis Pasteur =

1936 film by William Dieterle

- Theatrical release poster
- Directed by: William Dieterle
- Written by: Pierre Collings; Sheridan Gibney
- Produced by: Henry Blanke
- Starring: Paul Muni; Josephine Hutchinson; Anita Louise; Donald Woods
- Cinematography: Tony Gaudio
- Edited by: Ralph Dawson
- Music by: Leo F. Forbstein
- Distributed by: Warner Bros. Pictures
- Release date: February 22, 1936
- Running time: 87 minutes
- Country: United States
- Language: English

The Story of Louis Pasteur is a 1936 American black-and-white biographical film from Warner Bros. Pictures, produced by Henry Blanke and directed by William Dieterle, that stars Paul Muni as the renowned French scientist Louis Pasteur, who developed major advances in microbiology which revolutionized agriculture and medicine. The film's screenplay—which tells a highly fictionalized version of Pasteur's life—was written by Pierre Collings and Sheridan Gibney, as well as Edward Chodorov (uncredited).

The film was an instant success. Muni won an Academy Award for Best Actor, while Collings and Gibney won for Best Screenplay and Best Story. It was also nominated for Outstanding Production (Best Picture). Muni won the Volpi Cup for Best Actor from the Venice Film Festival in 1936.

== Plot ==
In 1860 Paris, a distraught man murders his wife's doctor. Chemist Louis Pasteur has publicized the theory that microbes cause diseases. Therefore, doctors should avoid spreading by washing their hands and sterilizing their instruments in boiling water. The doctor did not do this, and the wife died of puerperal fever after giving birth.

France's medical academy dismisses Pasteur—notably his most vocal critic, Dr. Charbonnet—as a crank whose recommendations are tantamount to witchcraft. Pasteur frankly calls attention to the risks of Charbonnet's non-sterile methods and correctly predicts that a member of Napoleon III's royal family who Charbonnet is attending will die of puerperal fever. Pasteur is considered dangerous because his ideas have led to murder. When the Emperor comes down against him, Pasteur leaves Paris and moves to Arbois.

In the 1870s, when the new French government tries to restore the economy after the Franco-Prussian War, they learn that many sheep are dying of anthrax, except around Arbois. They send representatives who realize that, after working with a small group of loyal researchers, Pasteur developed an anthrax vaccine.

The medical academy still opposes him and says Arbois must be free of anthrax, so the government buys land there and invites sheep farmers to use it. Pasteur objects strongly, saying the soil is full of anthrax spores, and eventually proposes an experiment. He will vaccinate 25 of the newly arrived sheep; then they and a control group of 25 others will be injected with blood from a sheep with anthrax.

Joseph Lister, the pioneer of antiseptic surgery in England, is interested enough to attend. He witnesses Pasteur's success as all the vaccinated sheep remain healthy after the other 25 die. At this point, Jean Martel, a young doctor who was formerly Charbonnet's assistant but now follows Pasteur, becomes engaged to Pasteur's daughter Annette.

The celebrations are short-lived, as a rabid dog runs through the town and bites a man. As a woman attempts to cure him by witchcraft, Pasteur laments that doctors would have no more chance of success. Moving back to Paris, he makes rabies his next project. He spreads the disease from one animal to another by injection but cannot detect any microbe being transferred (viruses had not yet been discovered), and the method he used to create the anthrax vaccine fails.

Charbonnet visits the lab to gloat over Pasteur's failure. He is so confident Pasteur is a quack that he injects himself with rabies—and is triumphant, as he does not get the disease. Pasteur is puzzled until his wife Marie suggests the sample may have weakened with age. This sets him on the right path, giving dogs progressively stronger injections.

But before his experiments conclude, a frantic mother begs him to try his untested treatment on her son, who a rabid dog has bitten. Despite fearing imprisonment or even execution for practicing without a license to provide medical treatment, Pasteur decides he must try to save the child. During the attempt, Dr. Zaranoff arrives from Russia with a group of peasants exposed to rabies. They have volunteered to receive Pasteur's treatment.

Annette goes into labor with Martel's child. The doctor to attend to her is unavailable, and the boy urgently needs Martel. Pasteur searches for another doctor, but he can only find Charbonnet. He begs Charbonnet to wash his hands and sterilize his instruments; Charbonnet finally agrees that if Charbonnet lives another month, Pasteur will retract and denounce all his work on rabies. Both men are honorable enough to respect the agreement. The birth goes well, but Pasteur suffers a mild stroke.

Days later, word comes that Pasteur has permission to treat the still-alive Russians. He attends them in hospital for the first injections using a wheelchair and later a cane. The experiment is a success, and now even Charbonnet concedes he was wrong, tearing up Pasteur's retraction and asking for the shots himself.

Afterwards, Pasteur hears that Lister will denounce him at the medical academy. He angrily attends, but it is actually a surprise. Lister praises him, Zaranoff presents him with a Russian medal, and the once-skeptical doctors honor him.

== Cast ==
- Paul Muni as Louis Pasteur
- Josephine Hutchinson as Marie Pasteur
- Anita Louise as Annette Pasteur
- Donald Woods as Dr. Jean Martel
- Fritz Leiber as Dr. Charbonnet
- Henry O'Neill as Dr. Emile Roux
- Porter Hall as Dr. Rossignol
- Raymond Brown as Dr. Radisse
- Akim Tamiroff as Dr. Zaranoff
- Halliwell Hobbes as Dr. Lister
- Frank Reicher as Dr. Pfeiffer
- Dickie Moore as Joseph Meister
- Ruth Robinson as Mrs. Meister
- Walter Kingsford as Napoleon III
- Iphigenie Castiglioni as Empress Eugénie
- Herbert Corthell as Louis Adolphe Thiers, President of France
- Frank Mayo as Sadi Carnot (uncredited)
- Leonid Snegoff as Russian Ambassador (uncredited)
- Edward Van Sloan as Chairman of Medical Society (uncredited)

== Reception ==
Contemporary reviews were favourable. Frank S. Nugent of the The New York Times observed that some historical accuracy was sacrificed in order to heighten the drama of the story, and stated that the film "is an excellent biography, just as it is a notable photoplay, dignified in subject, dramatic in treatment and brilliantly played by Paul Muni, Fritz Leiber, Josephine Hutchinson and many other members of the cast." He concluded that "It may not be the province—and probably it was not the primary motive—of a Hollywood studio to create a film which is, at the same time, a monument to the life of a man. But "The Story of Louis Pasteur" is truly that."

Variety described the film as "splendid", and in questioning it's commercial potential, opined that its success may depend on good reviews from critics and word of mouth, but that it should appeal to European audiences. They commented that "expert casting and splendid production" were the film's main assets, and praised the performances of Paul Muni, Josephine Hutchinson, Fritz Leiber and Henry O'Neill.

Writing for The Spectator, Graham Greene gave the film a good review, describing it as "an honest, interesting and well-made picture". Characterizing Paul Muni as "the greatest living actor" and as a "Protean figure", Greene asserts that Muni's depiction of Pasteur is accomplished "with his whole body [to establish] not only the bourgeois, the elderly, the stubborn and bitter and noble little chemist, but his nationality and even his period."m

== Radio adaptations ==
Paul Muni reprised his role in two radio play versions of the film: the November 23, 1936 episode of Lux Radio Theatre and the April 13, 1946 episode of Academy Award Theater.
