= After Business Hours =

1925 film directed by Malcolm St. Clair

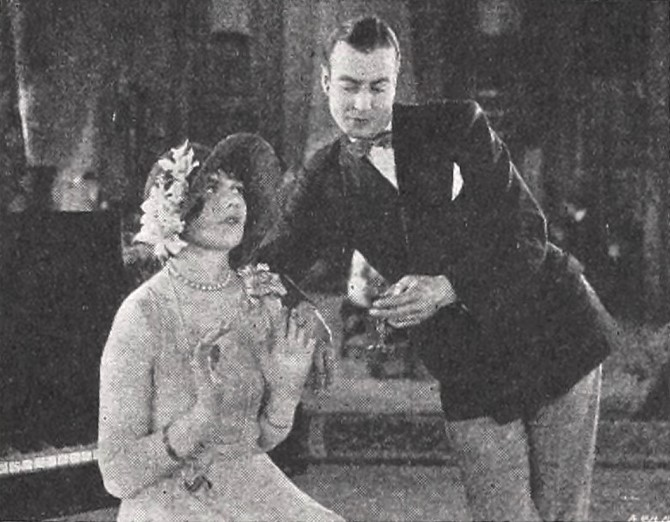
- Still with Hammerstein and John Patrick
- Directed by: Malcolm St. Clair
- Written by: Walter Anthony; Douglas Z. Doty
- Based on: "Everything Money Can Buy" by Ethel Watts Mumford
- Starring: Elaine Hammerstein; Lou Tellegen; Phyllis Haver
- Cinematography: Dewey Wrigley
- Edited by: Errol Taggart
- Production company: Columbia Pictures
- Distributed by: Columbia Pictures
- Release date: June 16, 1925
- Running time: 56 minutes
- Country: United States
- Language: Silent (English intertitles)

After Business Hours is a 1925 American silent drama film directed by Malcolm St. Clair and starring Elaine Hammerstein, Lou Tellegen, and Phyllis Haver.

The film is notable in that its critical success and box office profitability for Columbia Pictures prompted Paramount studio executives to acquire Malcolm St. Clair, where the director would create his finest pictures.

== Plot ==
As described in a film magazine review, John King enters married life with the plan of allowing his wife June no money except a few dollars a week. She gambles, loses, and is ashamed to ask her husband for enough to pay her losses. In an effort to repay her losses, she goes into gambling more heavily until her debts increase to a large sum. She gives her pearls as security. Her chauffeur blackmails her for money. To supply him with money, she takes a pin, which her friend Sylvia had dropped at her home, to a pawnbroker, forging Sylvia's signature. The pawnbroker, who had been turned down for membership in John's club, is ambitious to become a member. To force his way into the club, he threatens to disclose the forgery, causing the arrest of June. John fights him and obtains the pin. Returning home, his wife tells him the truth about the pin. He forgives her, taking the blame himself.

== Cast ==
- Elaine Hammerstein as June King
- Lou Tellegen as John King
- Phyllis Haver as Sylvia Vane
- John Patrick as Richard Downing
- Lillian Langdon as Mrs. Wentworth
- William Scott as James Hendricks
- Lee Moran as Jerry Stanton

== Production and reception ==
After his dismissal from the “budget conscious” Warner Bros. studios, director St. Clair was engaged by Columbia Pictures—at that time considered a “Poverty Row” studio—to direct After Business Hours. A “society drama,” this lost film was well received by reviewers. After Business Hours first appeared in a 71-minute version, the picture was pulled and re-released after editing to a length of 56 minutes. The shorter version was profitable, and its “artistic and financial success” garnered the attention of Paramount Picture executives.

== Preservation ==
A nitrate master of After Business Hours that is missing one of its five reels is in the collections of Library and Archives Canada.
