= On Thin Ice (1925 film) =

1925 film

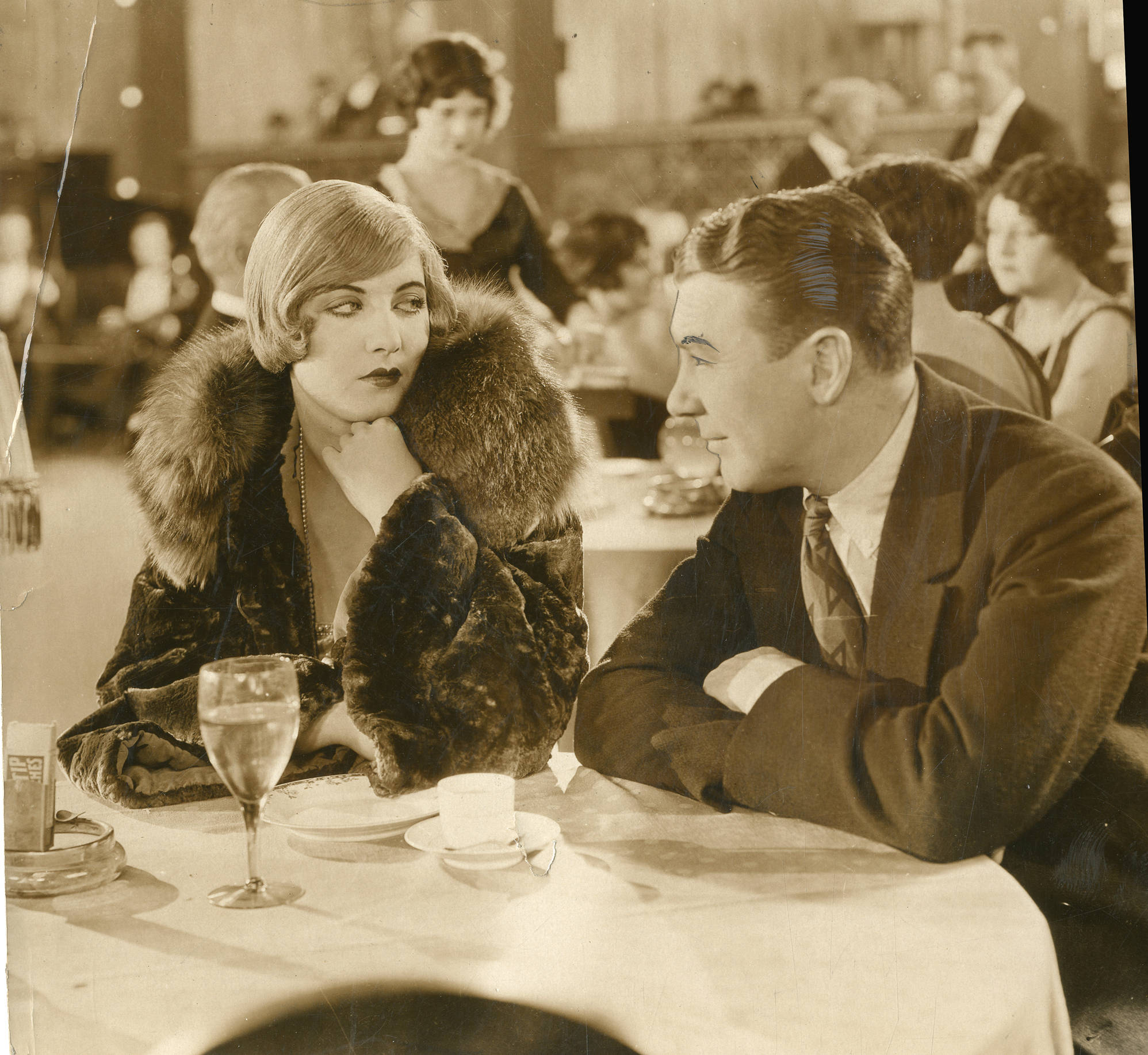
- Film still
- Directed by: Malcolm St. Clair
- Written by: Darryl F. Zanuck
- Based on: The Dear Pretender by Alice Ross Colver
- Starring: Tom Moore; Edith Roberts; William Russell
- Cinematography: Byron Haskin
- Edited by: Clarence Kolster
- Production company: Warner Bros.
- Distributed by: Warner Bros.
- Release date: January 30, 1925
- Running time: 7 reels
- Country: United States
- Language: Silent (English intertitles)

On Thin Ice is a 1925 American silent crime drama film directed by Mal St. Clair and starring Tom Moore, Edith Roberts, and William Russell. It was produced and distributed by Warner Bros. and based upon a 1924 novel by Alice Ross Colver.

== Plot ==
As described in a film magazine review, Rose, desperately in need of money, finds a bag of money thrown over a fence by crooks. She rushes home with it only to find her father has died. She attempts to return the satchel but it is filled with paper and worthless money. The crooks become friendly with her, and although harassed by the police, she finally wins over one of them into going straight.

== Cast ==
- Tom Moore as Charles White
- Edith Roberts as Rose Lore
- William Russell as Dapper Crawford
- Theodore von Eltz as Dr. Paul Jackson
- Wilfrid North as Harrison Breen
- Gertrude Robinson as Forger
- Texas Kid as Gangster
- Jimmy Quinn as Gangter

== Reception ==
Film historian Ruth Anne Dywer, quoting Leonard Mosley from his biography on Darryl Zanuck, reports that producer Jack Warner was not particularly impressed with St. Clair's directing, despite the fact that his Warner Bros. films had performed well at the box office.

New York Times film critic Mordaunt Hall characterized On Thin Ice as a “trite” and “clumsy story” in which “an effort has been made to maintain the mystery concerning the thief.” Hall concludes that director Mal St. Clair failed to endow the film “with any original or bright touches.”

Though Photoplay ranked On Thin Ice among the best of the month, the studio canceled St. Clair's contract following the release of the film.

== Preservation ==
With no prints of On Thin Ice located in any film archives, it is a lost film.

The picture survives only in screenplay form at the Library of the University of Southern California. Ruth Anne Dwyer notes that the motto “Those who skate on THIN ICE always fall through” was likely carried on the introductory title of the film itself.
