= Sheridan Gibney =

American screenwriter (1903–1988)

Sheridan de Raismes Gibney (June 11, 1903 – April 12, 1988) was an American writer and producer in theater and film. He graduated from Amherst College in 1925. He later served as an instructor at Hobart and William Smith Colleges. He began in film in 1931, but tended to see himself more as a playwright. He received 2 Academy Awards for Best Screenplay and Best Story for The Story of Louis Pasteur, sharing the award with Pierre Collings. He particularly had a fondness for Restoration comedy. He later became President of the Screen Writers Guild twice. As a member of the League of American Writers, he suffered from the Hollywood blacklist. Jack Warner later retracted the claim Gibney was a Communist and Gibney had proposed the group criticize Soviet actions against Finland although that ultimately was unanimously voted down. In his later life Gibney worked in television.

== Personal life ==
In 1951 Gibney travelled to West Germany to support the renewal of German labor unions, sponsored by the United States Department of State. While there he employed as a translator Katrin Janecke (1913-1996), a journalist and former employee of the Nazi propaganda ministry. Gibney and Janecke married in Los Angeles in 1952, and Janecke subsequently worked as a story editor on a number of Gibney's projects.
