= A Social Celebrity =

1926 film

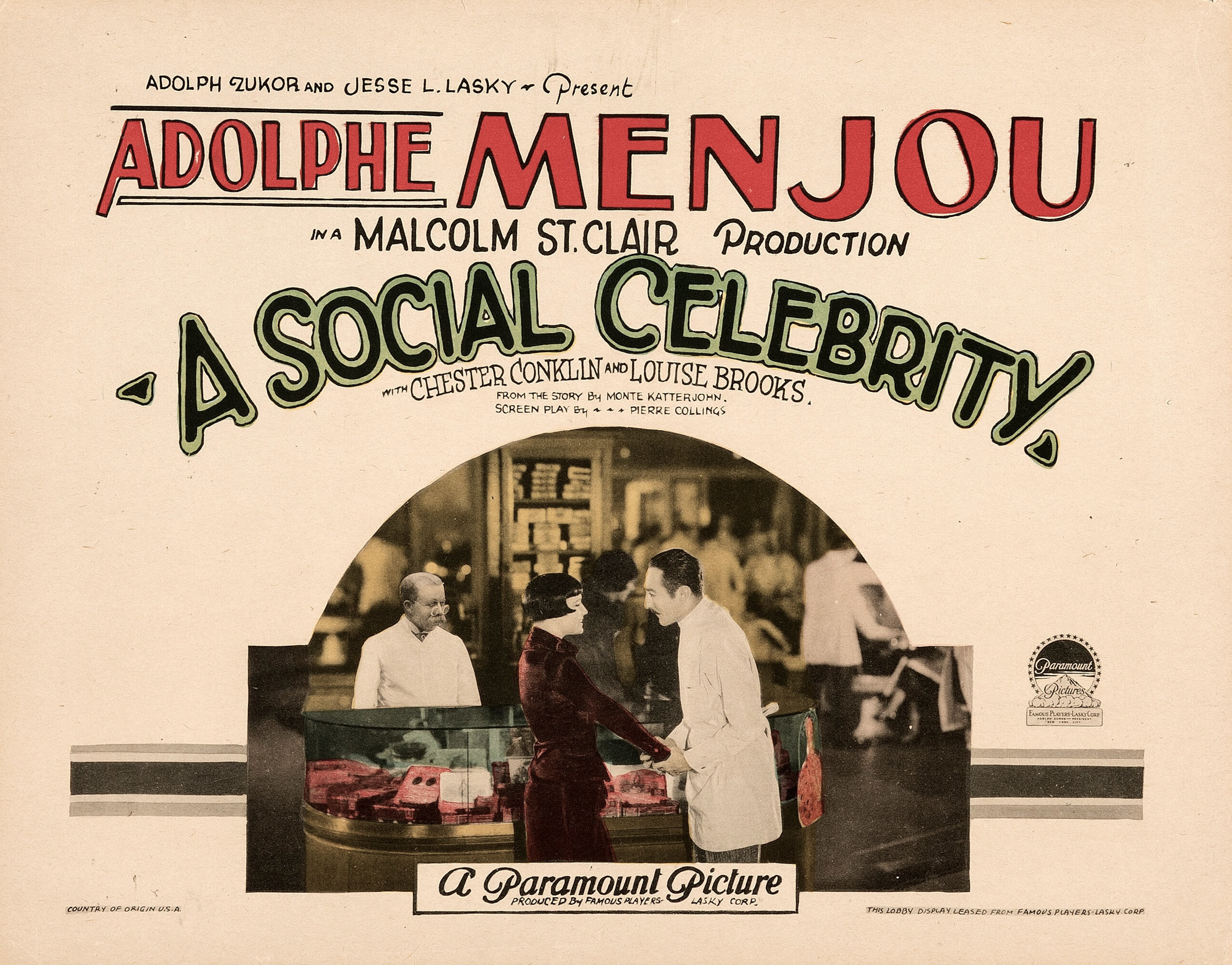
- Lobby card
- Directed by: Malcolm St. Clair
- Written by: Pierre Collings; Robert Benchley (titles)
- Story by: Monte M. Katterjohn
- Starring: Adolphe Menjou; Louise Brooks; Elsie Lawson; Roger Davis; Hugh Huntley
- Cinematography: Lee Garmes
- Production company: Famous Players–Lasky Corporation
- Distributed by: Paramount Pictures
- Release date: March 29, 1926
- Running time: 70 minutes
- Country: United States
- Language: Silent (English intertitles)

A Social Celebrity is a 1926 American silent comedy drama film directed by Malcolm St. Clair and starred Louise Brooks as a small town manicurist who goes to New York City with her boyfriend (Adolphe Menjou), a barber who poses as a French count. The film is now considered lost.

== Plot ==
Max Haber, a small town barber, is the pride of his father, Johann, who owns an antiquated barbershop. Max adores Kitty Laverne, the manicurist, who loves him but aspires to be a dancer and leaves for New York City, hoping that he will follow in pursuit of better things.

Mrs. Jackson-Greer, a New York society matron, has occasion to note Max fashioning the hair of a town girl and induces him to come to New York and pose as a French count. There he meets April, Mrs. King's niece, and loses his heart to her, as well as to Kitty, now a showgirl. At the theater where Kitty is appearing, Max is the best-dressed man in April's party. At a nightclub later that night, Max's true identity is revealed, and he is deserted by his society friends. Disillusioned, Max returns home at the request of his father. Kitty follows, realizing that he needs her.

== Cast ==
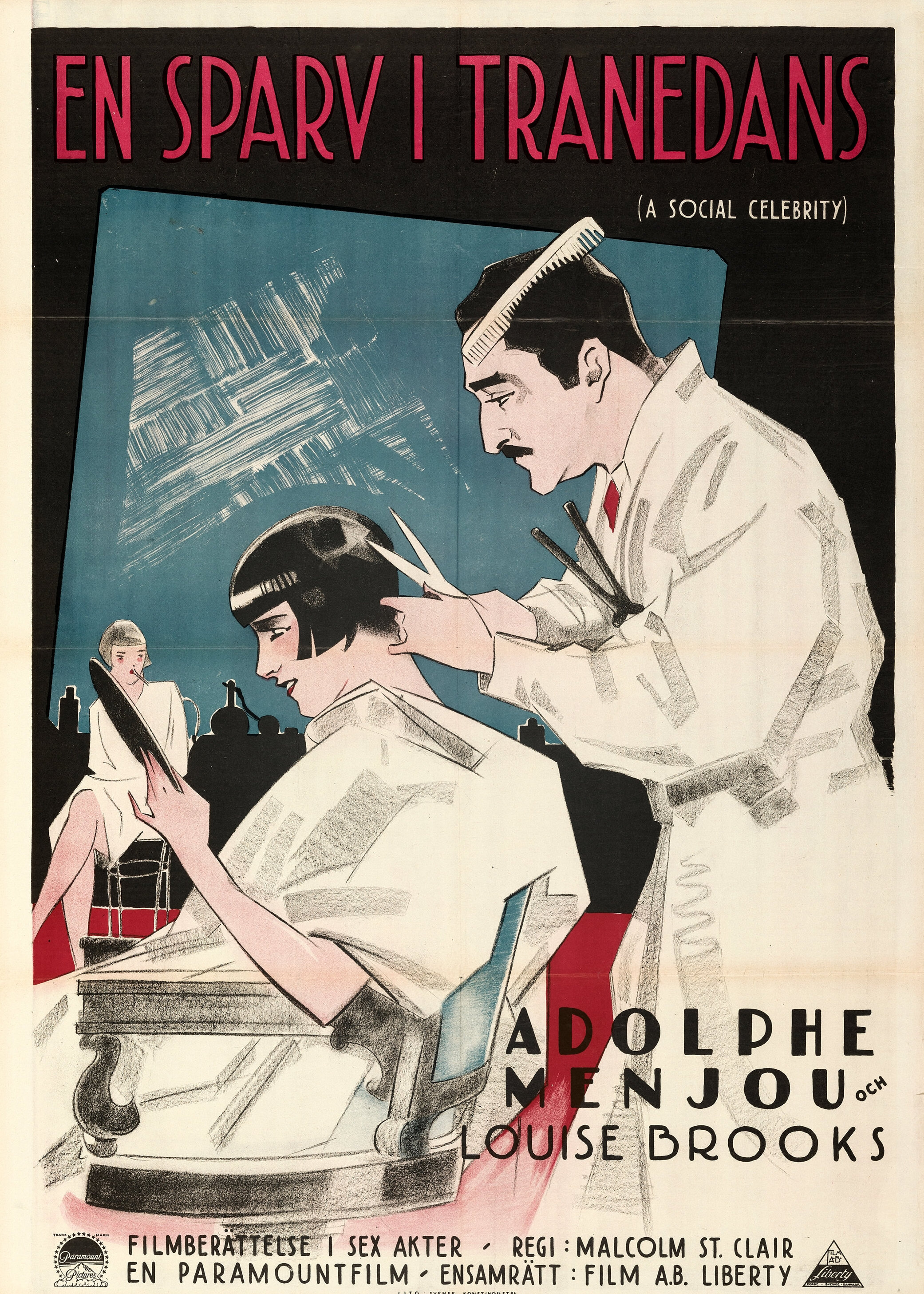
Poster for Swedish release.

- Adolphe Menjou as Max Haber
- Louise Brooks as Kitty Laverne
- Eleanor Lawson as April King (credited as Elsie Lawson)
- Roger Davis as Tenny
- Hugh Huntley as Forrest Abbott
- Chester Conklin as Johann Haber
- Freeman Wood as Gifford Jones
- Josephine Drake as Mrs. Jackson-Greer
- Ida Waterman as Mrs. Winifred King

== Production ==
The film was produced by Famous Players–Lasky Corporation and distributed by Paramount Pictures. A Social Celebrity began production in December 1925 with Greta Nissen in the lead role. Louise Brooks was also cast in a supporting role but was recast in the lead after Nissen left the project. The film was partially shot on location at Huntington, New York.

== Reception ==
New York Times film critic Mordaunt Hall considered the picture “adroitly directed and skilfully acted,” as well as a “light but pleasing” adaption of the original story by Monte M. Katterjohn. Hall reserves special praise for director St Clair's “remarkable ability in portraying the thoughts of his characters in a distinctly entertaining fashion” and augmenting the fine performances by Menjou and Brooks.

== Preservation ==
Prints of A Social Celebrity still existed up until the 1950s. One print was preserved at the George Eastman House where Louise Brooks viewed it in 1957. That print has since deteriorated. The last known print of the film was preserved at the Cinémathèque Française, but was destroyed in a vault fire on July 10, 1959. No prints of the film are known to exist and A Social Celebrity is now considered lost.

== See also ==
- List of lost films
