= Darryl F. Zanuck =

American film producer (1902–1979)

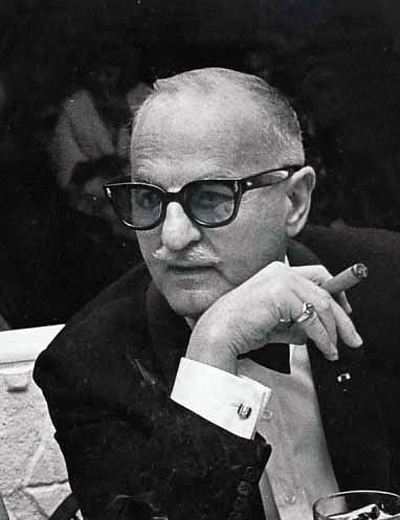
- Zanuck in 1964
- Born: Darryl Francis Zanuck; September 5, 1902; Wahoo, Nebraska, U.S.
- Died: December 22, 1979 (aged 77); Palm Springs, California, U.S.
- Resting place: Westwood Village Memorial Park Cemetery, Los Angeles
- Years active: 1922–1970
- Spouse: Virginia Fox (m. 1924)
- Children: 3, including Richard D. Zanuck
- Relatives: Dean Zanuck (grandson)

Darryl Francis Zanuck (/ˈzænək/ ZAN-ək; September 5, 1902 – December 22, 1979) was an American film producer and studio executive; he earlier contributed stories for films starting in the silent era. Best known as a co-founder of 20th Century Fox, he played a major part in the Hollywood studio system as one of its longest survivors (the length of his career was rivaled only by that of Adolph Zukor). Zanuck produced three films that won the Academy Award for Best Picture and won the Irving G. Thalberg Memorial Award three times, the only person to receive more than one.

== Early life ==
Zanuck was born in Wahoo, Nebraska, the son of Sarah Louise (née Torpin), who later married Charles Norton, and Frank Harvey Zanuck, who owned and operated a hotel in Wahoo. He had an older brother, Donald (1893–1903), who died from pneumonia when he was nine years old. Zanuck was of partial Swiss descent, and raised as a Protestant. At the age of six, Zanuck and his mother moved to Los Angeles, where the better climate could improve her poor health. When he was eight years old, he found his first movie job as an extra, but his disapproving father recalled him to Nebraska. In 1917, despite being 15, he deceived a recruiter, joined the U.S. Army, and served in France with the Nebraska National Guard during World War I.

Upon returning to the US, he worked at many part-time jobs while seeking work as a writer. He found work producing movie plots, and sold his first story in 1922 to William Russell and his second to Irving Thalberg. Screenwriter Frederica Sagor Maas, story editor at Universal Pictures' New York office, stated that one of the stories Zanuck sent out to movie studios around this time was completely plagiarized from another author's work.

Zanuck then worked for Mack Sennett and FBO (where he wrote the serials The Telephone Girl and The Leather Pushers) and took that experience to Warner Bros., where he wrote stories for Rin Tin Tin and under a number of pseudonyms wrote more than 40 scripts from 1924 to 1929, including Red Hot Tires (1925) and Old San Francisco (1927). He moved into management in 1929, and became head of production in 1931.

== Career ==
=== Studio head ===
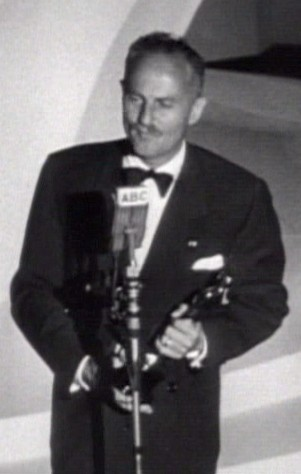
Zanuck at the Academy Awards celebration

In April 1933, Zanuck left Warner Bros. over an industry salary dispute when studio head Jack L. Warner refused to comply with the Academy of Motion Pictures Arts and Sciences' decision to restore salary cuts. A few days later, he partnered with Joseph Schenck to form 20th Century Pictures, Inc. with financial help from Joseph's brother Nicholas Schenck and Louis B. Mayer, president and studio head of Loew's, Inc and its subsidiary Metro-Goldwyn-Mayer, along with William Goetz and Raymond Griffith. 20th Century released its material through United Artists.

During that short time (1933–1935), 20th Century became the most successful independent movie studio of its time, breaking box-office records with 18 of its 19 films, all profitable, including Clive of India, Les Miserables, and The House of Rothschild. After a dispute with United Artists over stock ownership, Schenck and Zanuck negotiated and used their studio to bring the bankrupt Fox studios in 1935 to create Twentieth Century-Fox Film Corporation.

Zanuck was Vice President of Production of this new studio and took a hands-on approach, closely involving himself in scripts, film editing, and producing.

=== World War II ===
When the U.S. entered World War II at the end of 1941, he was commissioned as a colonel in the U.S. Army Signal Corps, but was frustrated to find himself posted to the Astoria studios in Queens, New York, serving alongside the spoiled son of Universal's founder, Carl Laemmle Jr., who was chauffeured by limousine to the facility each morning from a luxury Manhattan hotel.

Appalled by such privileged cosseting, Zanuck stormed down to Washington, DC, and into the War Department, demanding a riskier assignment from Chief of Staff, General George C. Marshall. Since American forces were not yet fighting anywhere, Marshall had Zanuck posted to London as chief U.S. liaison officer to the British Army film unit, where he would be studying army training films while under Nazi bombardment by Hitler's Luftwaffe.

He even persuaded Lord Mountbatten to allow him along on a secret coastal raid across the Channel to occupied France. The daring nighttime attack on a German radar site was a success. Zanuck, sent his wife in Santa Monica a package of "Nazi-occupied sand", writing her "I've just been swimming on an enemy beach" – not allowed to tell her where he had been, or that they had been under Nazi gunfire and helped the wounded back to the ship.

While Zanuck was on duty, 20th Century-Fox, like the other studios, contributed to the war effort by releasing a large number of their male stars for overseas service and many of their female stars for USO and war bond tours — while creating patriotic films under the often contentious supervision of a fledgling Office of War Information. Jack L. Warner, whose studio lot happened to be next door to a Lockheed factory, was made a colonel in the Army Air Corps without ever actually having to leave the studio, or don a uniform. Not so Zanuck, who pleaded with the War Department, as soon as American troops were posted for action in North Africa, and was rewarded with the assignment of covering the invasion for the Signal Corps.

Director John Ford, a longtime adversary of Zanuck despite the latter's having shepherded Ford's The Grapes of Wrath (1940) past the censorious Hays office into production, had been making films as a commander in the U.S. Navy even before the U.S. entered the war, and he was horrified to discover himself drafted into Zanuck's Africa unit. "Can't I ever get away from you?" he growled. "I bet if I die and go to heaven, you'll be waiting for me under a sign reading 'Produced by Darryl F. Zanuck'."

Ford's chagrin turned to real outrage when Zanuck, after three months, took all their footage from battles in Tunisia, most of which Ford had shot, and hastily assembled it into a picture that went into American theaters without Ford's name appearing anywhere. The movie, released as At The Front with Zanuck credited as producer, was poorly received in the States, called amateurish, dull, and even lacking in realism, prompting the affronted Zanuck to counter in The New York Times that he had resisted the temptation to stage events for a more convincing film. Unfortunately, this controversy landed Zanuck into a Senate subcommittee headed by Senator Harry S. Truman, investigating "instant" colonels who were popping up and concentrating on famous Hollywood names.

Unlike Col. Warner, most colonels from the studio system — Col. Frank Capra, Col. Anatole Litvak, Col. Hal Roach—were actually doing their cinematic jobs, often, like Zanuck, under enemy fire. Nonetheless, when Col. Zanuck was named in this investigation in 1944, the usually combative mogul uncharacteristically and abruptly resigned his commission and left the Army. Biographer Leonard Mosley suggests this to be because of an inadvertent security leak when Zanuck had mentioned a top-secret, brand new, massively powerful bomb the size of a "golf ball" to a fellow officer from his Hollywood world. Whatever the reason, despite having published his own first-person account of his wartime adventures (The New York Times critic Bosley Crowther actually liked this book better than the film), he resigned.

=== Studio head (1944–1956) ===
Zanuck returned to 20th Century-Fox in 1944 a changed man. He avoided the studio and instead read books at home, surrounded by his growing family, and caught up on all the films he had missed while overseas in his private screening room. He did not return to take the reins until William Goetz, the man Zanuck had left in charge when he went off to war, left for a job at Universal.

Zanuck's tenure in the 1940s and '50s resonated with his astute choices. He first personally rescued a cumbersome cut of The Song of Bernadette (1943), recutting the completed film into a surprise hit that made a star of the newcomer Jennifer Jones, who won the Oscar. He relented to the actor Otto Preminger's fervent wish to direct a modest thriller called Laura (1944), casting Clifton Webb in his Oscar-nominated role as Gene Tierney's controlling mentor, with David Raksin's haunting score.

The leading theater director Elia Kazan was carefully nurtured through his first film, A Tree Grows in Brooklyn (1945), based on a popular novel. It did so well that he chose Kazan to direct the first studio film on antisemitism, the Oscar-winning Gentleman's Agreement (1947), with Gregory Peck playing a Gentile reporter whose life falls apart from implacable antisemitism emerging from friends and family when he pretends to be Jewish for an exposé. After Kazan triumphed in Tennessee Williams's Broadway hit, A Streetcar Named Desire, Zanuck brought Kazan back to direct Pinky (1949), another film about prejudice, this time racial.

The scathing theater world of Bette Davis's aging actress in All About Eve (1950) went on to win six Oscars at the Academy Awards; the disturbing questions of a bomber squadron leader portrayed by Gregory Peck in Twelve O'Clock High (1949) challenged wartime patriotism. Both showed Zanuck's ability to create box-office hits via brilliant films with unflinching examinations of demanding, hierarchical worlds. Zanuck continued to tackle social issues other studios would not touch, but he stumbled with idealistic projects. Wilson (1944), an expensive picture that was unsuccessful at the box office, and an attempt to make a film of One World, a memoir by politician Wendell Willkie of his tour of war-damaged Europe, a project that was aborted before shooting began.

=== CinemaScope ===
As television began to erode Hollywood's audiences in the early 1950s, widescreen presentation was thought to be a potential solution. The 1950 television set duplicated the near-square shape of the 35 mm format in which all movies were shot—and this was no accident. Standardization of film size meant all theaters everywhere could play all films. Even the projection of film formats—i.e. any attempt to break out of the 35 mm format were under the control of the Hays Office, which limited any wide-screen experiments to the 10 largest cities in America. This severely limited the future of any widescreen format.

Zanuck was an early advocate of widescreen projection. One of the first things Zanuck did when he returned to Fox in 1944 was to restart the research on a 50 mm film, shelved in the early 1930s as a cost-cutting measure (a larger-sized film print in the projector meant higher resolution). Impressed by a screening in Cinerama, a three-projector widescreen process, unveiled in 1952 that promised to envelop the viewer in a wrap-around image, Zanuck wrote an essay extolling widescreen's virtues, seeing the new formats as a "participatory" form of recreation, rather than mere passive entertainment, such as television. Cinerama was cumbersome, though, and used three (image) projectors simultaneously (plus a 4th projector for sound), potentially a hugely expensive investment. Fox, like every other studio, had rejected Cinerama when the innovative new process was pitched to them for investment. In retrospect, this looked like a mistake, but nothing could be done. Cinerama was no longer for sale.

Zanuck now urged the studio to keep the same principle, but find a more feasible approach. He approved a massive investment into a system that would be called CinemaScope—$10 million in its first year alone. The urgency was increased when an aggressive appliance tycoon and shareholder, Charles Green, began threatening a proxy takeover, claiming the current Fox administration was wasting stockholders' money. He attempted to conspire with Zanuck to oust the New York-based president of Fox since 1942, Greek-American Spyros Skouras. Zanuck refused; instead, Skouras and he decided to gamble on CinemaScope to save their jobs, and perhaps, their studio.

Skouras made a bold announcement in February; Fox not only had a new and vastly more economical and efficient wide-screen process, but all Fox films would be released in CinemaScope—a format which had yet to be perfected. The Robe (1953), a Biblical epic, would be its first released feature film. Skouras now began to oversee Fox's somewhat startled research scientists, based on the East Coast and accustomed to Hollywood executives who thought R&D was a waste of money. Then Skouras flew to Paris to meet with a French inventor, Henri Chrétien, who had created a new lens that just might be suitable.

Though Fox shares immediately went up, Green found this an even more damning indication of Zanuck and Skouras's leadership and began readying his proxy fight for the May shareholder meeting. This meant that a CinemaScope process had to be publicly demonstrated to the industry's studios, theater owners, manufacturers, to stockholders and the press—by mid-March, to give them enough time to impress their shareholders with their new product and thus win the proxy fight.

With Chrétien's new lens, the Fox engineers pulled it together—a widescreen, Cinerama-like picture projected using only one projector, not three. Zanuck carried out presentations of CinemaScope to the press in cities across the country throughout April, as Skouras and he gathered their forces for the proxy fight. "The enthusiastic response of those who attended these screenings and the laudatory reviews of CinemaScope in the trade press," writes John Belton in his book, Widescreen (1992), "undoubtedly played a major role in Green's defeat" at the May 5 meeting. CinemaScope's need for a wider screen was because of an anamorphic lens attached to the camera which, squeezed the image while filming, and another lens on the projector, which reverted the process, widening the image during screening.

Implementing this was no easy matter. Directors, cameramen, and production designers were baffled by what to do with all that space. Zanuck encouraged them to spread the action across the screen, to take full advantage of the new proportions. Committed to its all-widescreen slate, Fox had to drop several projects that were deemed unsuitable for CinemaScope—one of them being Elia Kazan's On the Waterfront (1954), which Zanuck could not visualize being in color and widescreen. (Kazan took the project to Columbia, which had thus far stayed on the sidelines of the widescreen debate.) The public demonstrations in spring had already included excerpts from The Robe and How to Marry a Millionaire (also 1953), a glossy star package with Marilyn Monroe and Lauren Bacall.

Of the other studios, MGM had immediately abandoned its own attempts and committed to CinemaScope and United Artists and Walt Disney Productions announced they would make films in the same widescreen process, but the other studios hesitated, and some announced their own rival systems: Paramount's VistaVision, which would prove a worthy rival, and Warner Bros.'s WarnerScope which vanished overnight. The November 3, 1953, premiere of The Robe brought Warner Bros. and Columbia around, though Warner's plan had a full slate of 3-D features for 1954 instead. Zanuck began to make compromises, and eventually capitulated. Smaller theaters rented conventional versions of the studio's films; stereo they could live without altogether. Todd-AO came out in 1955, and after its developer, Mike Todd, died in 1958, Zanuck invested in the process for Fox's most exclusive roadshows. Although pictures continued to be shot in CinemaScope until 1967, it ironically became relegated to Fox's conventional releases. Nonetheless, the Battle of the Screens seemed to leave Zanuck emotionally exhausted.

=== Going independent ===
Following the commercial disappointment of The Egyptian (1954), in 1956 Zanuck withdrew from the studio and left his wife, Virginia Fox, to move to Europe and concentrate on independent producing with a generous contract from Fox that gave him directing and casting control on any projects Fox financed. Eventually, in his absence, Fox began to fall to pieces due to the ballooning budget of Cleopatra (1963), whose entire set constructed at Pinewood Studios had to be scrapped before shooting even started.

Meanwhile, Zanuck picked up a hefty book by Cornelius Ryan called The Longest Day, which promised to fulfill his dream of making the definitive film of D-Day. Flying back to the States, he had to convince a Fox board, staggering under the still-unfinished Cleopatra's $15 million cost, to finance what he was sure would be a box-office hit, as indeed it was, despite skeptics that included his son Richard. He seethed at the $8 million ceiling imposed on him, knowing he would have to dip into his own pocket to finish the film, as he soon did.

=== Return to Fox ===
Fearing the studio's prodigality would sink his cherished The Longest Day (1962) as it readied for release, Zanuck returned to control Fox. He replaced Spyros Skouras as president, who had failed to control perilous cost overruns on the still-unfinished Cleopatra and had been forced to shelve Marilyn Monroe's last vehicle, Something's Got to Give after principal photography had started, at a loss of $2 million. Zanuck promptly made his son, Richard D. Zanuck, head of production.

Richard displayed his own flair for picking fresh, new hits, helped by his fellow producer, David Brown. He plucked Rodgers and Hammerstein's least successful Broadway show from obscurity and turned it into the highly successful The Sound of Music (1965), committed to the science-fiction hit Planet of the Apes (1968), allowed director Robert Altman to create his antiwar comedy MASH (1970) and hired the little-known Francis Coppola to write Patton (1970) into a project for George C. Scott.

However, Zanuck Sr's next all-star World War II film Tora! Tora! Tora! (1970) was plagued with production problems from the start. First, director David Lean pulled out of the Pearl Harbor retelling, and had to be hastily replaced by Richard Fleischer; storms destroyed expensive exteriors, closing down production while they were rebuilt; then the Japanese co-director Akira Kurosawa, miffed by criticism of his early rushes, either really had or merely faked a nervous breakdown before his cast and crew and had to be hospitalized, shutting down production again.

When finally finished, the film, which was carefully authentic, appeared to be a chronicle of American defeat, At the height of the Vietnam War in Asia this did not appeal to critics or the public.

As the tumultuous decade wore on, Richard also began to falter with lavish costume musicals that expensively tanked: Rex Harrison as the man who could talk to the animals in Doctor Dolittle (1967), Julie Andrews in the period film Star! (1968), and Barbra Streisand in Hello Dolly (1969).

== Personal life ==
=== Marriage and family ===
On January 12, 1924, he married actress Virginia Fox, with whom he had three children, Darrylin, Susan Marie, and Richard Darryl. Fox, who at a time had been a leading lady in many silent films, retired from acting but became known as a behind-the-scenes influence on her husband's business decisions, as well as a prominent California hostess. The couple separated in 1956, after Zanuck had suddenly resigned from Twentieth Century-Fox to become an independent producer, over Zanuck's well-publicized affairs with other actresses, although they never legally divorced. In 1973, after Zanuck retired from filmmaking, the two reconciled and lived together in Palm Springs, and she cared for him at their home from the time he became mentally incapacitated in the early 1970s until his death in 1979.

=== Extramarital affairs ===
While on the French Riviera, the Zanucks met Bajla Węgier, a Polish-born woman who had been raised in France. The Zanucks invited her to come to Los Angeles and in 1952 she moved there to live with them and began acting lessons. The woman soon changed her name to Bella Darvi, "Darvi" being a combination of the first names of the Zanucks, Darryl and Virginia. Eventually, she became Darryl F. Zanuck's mistress, who began pushing for starring roles for her, such as in Sam Fuller's film Hell and High Water (1954) and as Nefer, a seductive Babylonian courtesan, in The Egyptian (1954), winning the role over Ava Gardner. This was accompanied by a heavy promotional campaign; Hedda Hopper called her "an exciting new personality" and predicted she would be one of the "stars of 1954" and "make a splash" in her first film. However, the films were critical disappointments. Upon Hell and High Water coming out in February, the New York Times said Darvi "does not succeed convincingly" and The Egyptian saw Marlon Brando walking off the picture after the first read-through and Darvi's performance being criticized for her unintelligible accent. Afterwards, she left Hollywood to return to Paris, and Zanuck would later say about trying to build Darvi into a star, "I was guilty of egomania."

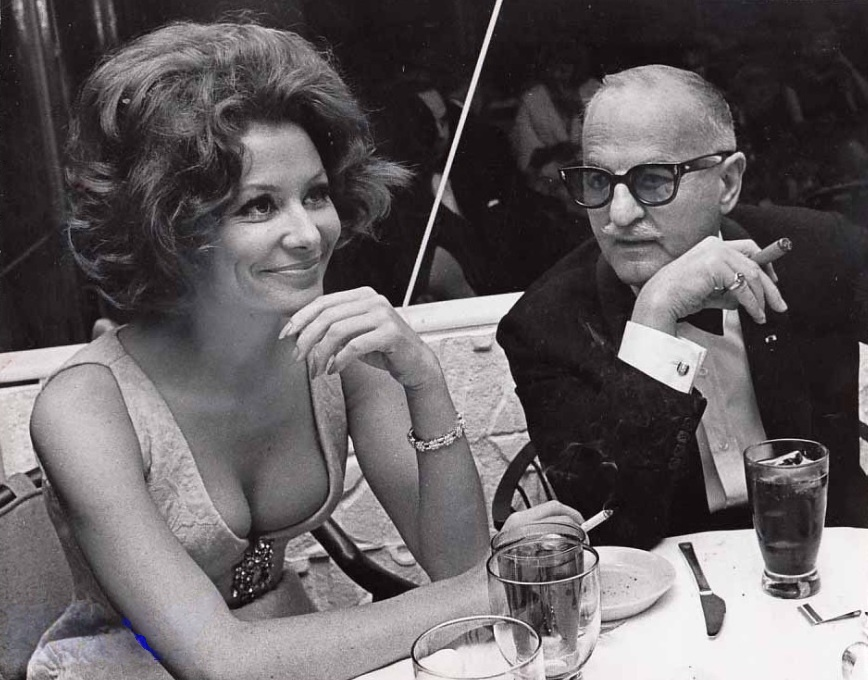
Zanuck with Irina Demick in 1964

Following this, Zanuck would establish a pattern of beginning affairs with European actresses and attempt to turn them into films stars by giving them prominent roles in 20th Century Fox films: He had affairs with singer and actress Juliette Gréco, whom he cast in The Sun Also Rises (1957); Irina Demick, whom he cast in The Longest Day (1962) as a French Resistance fighter; and Genevieve Gilles, whose only film, as the lead in Hello-Goodbye (1970), was conceived and written by Zanuck. In 1980, Gilles filed a $15 million claim against Zanuck's estate, claiming that Zanuck's son Richard influenced his father to remove her from his final will in 1973. Zanuck family members countersued. Zanuck's will was settled on January 8, 1988, after Gilles provided that her claim on the estate would be given to Yeshiva University in New York. The university received a $50,000 payment.

=== Sexual misconduct allegations ===
An October 2017 article by The Daily Beast, following the reporting of several sexual abuse cases committed by Harvey Weinstein reported that "For an origin to all this ugliness, one must turn to Darryl F. Zanuck, the titan who rose from working as the head of production at Warner Bros. to running Twentieth Century Fox. It was in the latter position that he supposedly begat the modern casting couch, holding conferences with a variety of starlets in his office every afternoon from 4-4:30 p.m." The article further adds that "As some have argued, he may have learned this malicious practice from fellow studio head Harry Cohn, chief of Columbia Pictures during the first half of the 20th century, as Cohn reportedly even had a private room next to his office where he conducted his unofficial 'business'", and went on to blame both Zanuck and Cohn for having "helped foster the industry's corrosive atmosphere of sexualized misconduct."

A New York Times article in February 2020 following Weinstein's conviction repeated similar claims about Zanuck, while reporting that he also "had a well-documented habit of flashing his penis at women."

According to Zanuck's biographer, Marlys Harris: "Anyone at the studio knew of the afternoon trysts, [...] [Zanuck] was not serious about any of the women. To him they were merely pleasurable breaks in the day — like polo, lunch, and practical jokes."

== Death ==
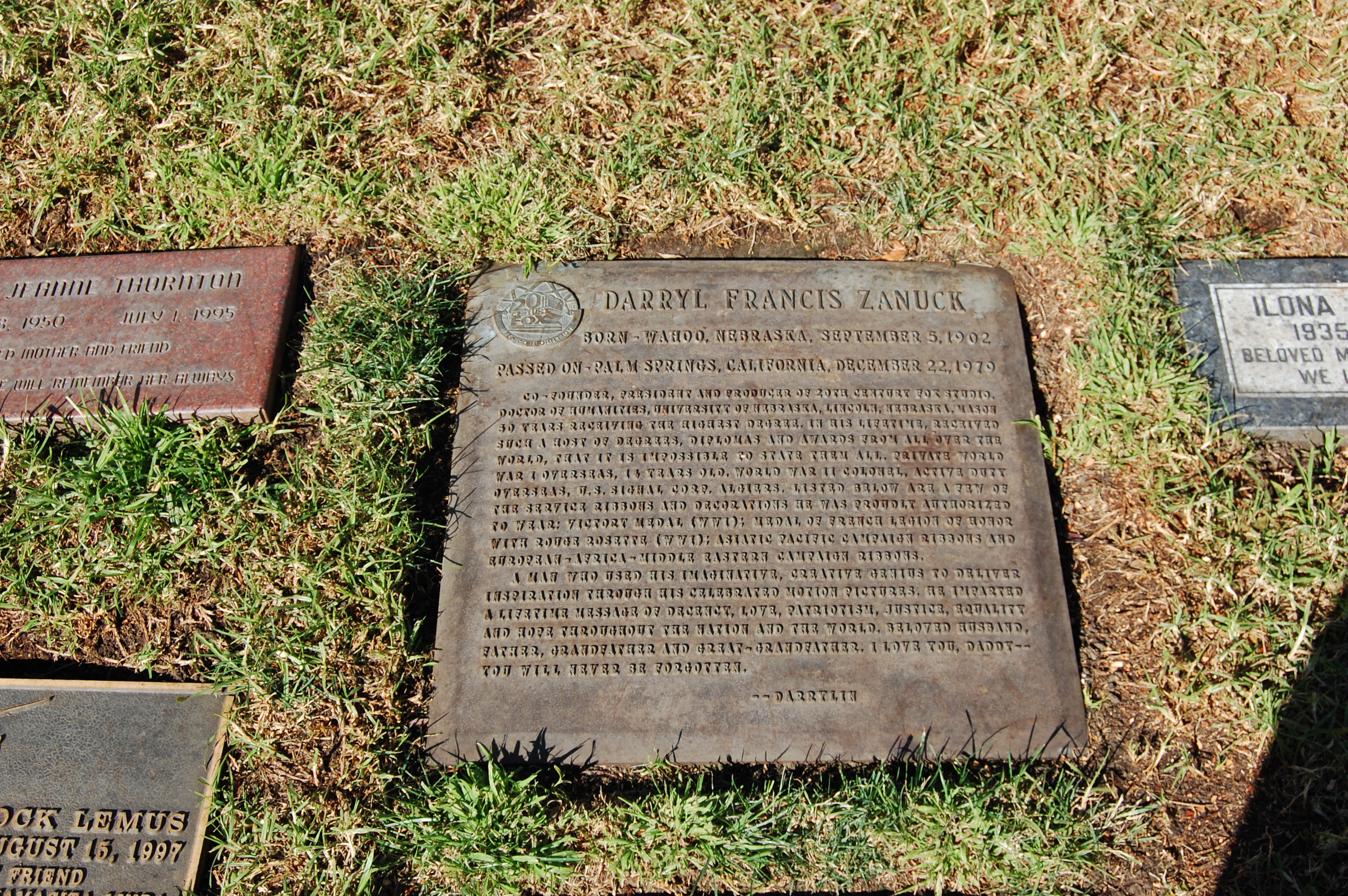
Darryl Zanuck's grave at the Westwood Village Memorial Park Cemetery

A long-time cigar smoker, he died of pneumonia in 1979, aged 77. He is interred at the Westwood Village Memorial Park Cemetery, near his wife, Virginia Fox in Westwood, Los Angeles, California.

== Legacy ==
On February 8, 1960, Zanuck received a star on the Hollywood Walk of Fame, for his contribution to the motion picture industry, at 6336 Hollywood Blvd.

In the 2022 Netflix film Blonde, Zanuck was portrayed by David Warshofsky.

== Academy Awards ==
Academy Award nominations for Darryl F. Zanuck films
Year	Result	Category	Film
1929–30	Nominated	Outstanding Production	Disraeli
1932–33	Nominated	Outstanding Production	42nd Street
1934	Nominated	Outstanding Production	The House of Rothschild
1935	Nominated	Outstanding Production	Les Misérables
1937	Nominated	Outstanding Production	In Old Chicago
1938	Nominated	Outstanding Production	Alexander's Ragtime Band
1940	Nominated	Outstanding Production	The Grapes of Wrath
1941	Won	Outstanding Motion Picture	How Green Was My Valley
1944	Nominated	Best Motion Picture	Wilson
1946	Nominated	Best Motion Picture	The Razor's Edge
1947	Won	Best Motion Picture	Gentleman's Agreement
1949	Nominated	Best Motion Picture	Twelve O'Clock High
1950	Won	Best Motion Picture	All About Eve
1956	Nominated	Best Motion Picture	The King and I ("Darryl F. Zanuck presents" is seen in the opening credits)
1962	Nominated	Best Picture	The Longest Day

== Filmography ==
=== Produced by Zanuck ===
- 1970 Tora! Tora! Tora! (executive producer)
- 1964 The Visit
- 1962 The Chapman Report
- 1962 The Longest Day
- 1961 The Big Gamble
- 1961 Sanctuary
- 1960 Crack in the Mirror
- 1958 The Roots of Heaven
- 1958 The Barbarian and the Geisha
- 1957 The Sun Also Rises
- 1957 Island in the Sun
- 1956 The King and I (executive producer – uncredited)
- 1956 The Man in the Gray Flannel Suit
- 1956 Carousel (executive producer – uncredited)
- 1954 The Egyptian
- 1952 The Snows of Kilimanjaro
- 1952 With a Song in My Heart
- 1952 Viva Zapata!
- 1951 People Will Talk
- 1951 David and Bathsheba
- 1950 All About Eve
- 1950 No Way Out
- 1949 Twelve O'Clock High
- 1949 Pinky
- 1948 The Snake Pit
- 1947 Captain from Castile
- 1947 Gentleman's Agreement
- 1947 Nightmare Alley
- 1947 Moss Rose
- 1946 The Razor's Edge
- 1946 Dragonwyck
- 1945 Leave Her to Heaven (executive producer)
- 1944 Wilson
- 1944 Buffalo Bill (executive producer)
- 1941 How Green Was My Valley
- 1941 Swamp Water
- 1941 A Yank in the R.A.F.
- 1941 Moon Over Miami
- 1941 Man Hunt (executive producer)
- 1941 Blood and Sand
- 1941 That Night in Rio
- 1941 Tobacco Road
- 1941 Western Union
- 1941 Hudson's Bay
- 1940 Chad Hanna
- 1940 The Mark of Zorro
- 1940 Down Argentine Way
- 1940 Brigham Young
- 1940 The Return of Frank James
- 1940 The Man I Married
- 1940 Lillian Russell
- 1940 Little Old New York
- 1940 The Grapes of Wrath
- 1940 The Blue Bird
- 1939 The Little Princess
- 1939 Swanee River
- 1939 Hollywood Cavalcade
- 1939 Here I Am a Stranger
- 1939 The Rains Came
- 1939 The Adventures of Sherlock Holmes
- 1939 Stanley and Livingstone
- 1939 Second Fiddle
- 1939 Susannah of the Mounties (executive producer)
- 1939 Young Mr. Lincoln
- 1939 Rose of Washington Square
- 1939 The Story of Alexander Graham Bell
- 1939 The Hound of the Baskervilles (executive producer)
- 1939 Wife, Husband and Friend
- 1939 Tail Spin
- 1939 Jesse James
- 1938 Kentucky (executive producer)
- 1938 Submarine Patrol
- 1938 My Lucky Star
- 1938 Gateway
- 1938 I'll Give a Million
- 1938 Little Miss Broadway
- 1938 Just Around the Corner
- 1938 Rebecca of Sunnybrook Farm
- 1938 Always Goodbye
- 1938 Josette (executive producer)
- 1938 Kentucky Moonshine
- 1938 International Settlement
- 1938 Happy Landing
- 1938 In Old Chicago
- 1937 Love and Hisses
- 1937 Lancer Spy
- 1937 Wife, Doctor and Nurse
- 1937 Thin Ice
- 1937 Wake Up and Live
- 1937 Wee Willie Winkie
- 1937 Slave Ship
- 1937 Seventh Heaven
- 1937 Nancy Steele Is Missing! (executive producer)
- 1936 Banjo on My Knee (executive producer)
- 1936 Reunion (executive producer)
- 1936 Pigskin Parade
- 1936 Ramona (executive producer)
- 1936 Sing, Baby, Sing
- 1936 To Mary – with Love
- 1936 Poor Little Rich Girl
- 1936 The Road to Glory
- 1936 Half Angel
- 1936 Under Two Flags
- 1936 The Country Beyond
- 1936 A Message to Garcia
- 1936 It Had to Happen
- 1936 The Prisoner of Shark Island
- 1935 Professional Soldier
- 1935 Show Them No Mercy!
- 1935 The Man Who Broke the Bank at Monte Carlo
- 1935 Thanks a Million
- 1935 Metropolitan
- 1935 The Call of the Wild
- 1935 Cardinal Richelieu
- 1935 Les Misérables
- 1935 Folies Bergère de Paris
- 1934 The Mighty Barnum
- 1934 Bulldog Drummond Strikes Back
- 1934 Born to Be Bad
- 1934 The Last Gentleman
- 1934 Looking for Trouble
- 1934 Moulin Rouge
- 1933 Gallant Lady
- 1933 Advice to the Lovelorn
- 1933 Blood Money
- 1933 The Bowery
- 1933 Ex-Lady
- 1933 The Working Man
- 1933 42nd Street
- 1933 Parachute Jumper
- 1932 20,000 Years in Sing Sing
- 1932 Three on a Match
- 1932 The Cabin in the Cotton
- 1932 Life Begins
- 1932 Doctor X
- 1932 The Dark Horse
- 1932 The Rich Are Always with Us
- 1932 The Man Who Played God
- 1931 The Public Enemy
- 1931 Illicit
- 1931 Little Caesar
- 1930 The Doorway to Hell
- 1930 Three Faces East
- 1929 The Show of Shows
- 1929 On with the Show!
- 1928 Tenderloin
- 1927 The Jazz Singer
- 1927 The First Auto
- 1926 So This Is Paris
- 1925 Lady Windermere's Fan

=== Written by Zanuck ===
- 1968 D-Day Revisited (Documentary)
- 1960 Crack in the Mirror (as Mark Canfield)
- 1944 The Purple Heart (story – as Melville Crossman)
- 1942 China Girl (story – as Melville Crossman)
- 1942 Thunder Birds (original story – as Melville Crossman)
- 1942 Ten Gentlemen from West Point
- 1941 A Yank in the R.A.F. (story – as Melville Crossman)
- 1940 The Great Profile (story – uncredited)
- 1938 Alexander's Ragtime Band (contributing writer – uncredited)
- 1937 This Is My Affair (story – uncredited)
- 1935 Thanks a Million (story – as Melville Crossman)
- 1935 G Men (story)
- 1935 Folies Bergère de Paris (contributing writer – uncredited)
- 1933 Lady Killer (story – uncredited)
- 1933 Baby Face (story – as Mark Canfield)
- 1932 The Dark Horse (story)
- 1931 Little Caesar (story – uncredited)
- 1930 The Life of the Party
- 1930 Maybe It's Love (as Mark Canfield)
- 1929 Say It with Songs (story)
- 1929 Madonna of Avenue A (story)
- 1929 Hardboiled Rose (story)
- 1928 My Man (story)
- 1928 Noah's Ark (story)
- 1928 The Midnight Taxi (story – as Gregory Rogers)
- 1928 State Street Sadie (story – as Melville Crossman)
- 1928 Pay as You Enter (story – as Gregory Rogers)
- 1928 Tenderloin (story – as Melville Crossman)
- 1927 Ham and Eggs at the Front (story)
- 1927 Good Time Charley (story)
- 1927 Jaws of Steel (Rin Tin Tin story as Gregory Rogers)
- 1927 Slightly Used (story – as Melville Crossman)
- 1927 The Desired Woman (story – as Mark Canfield)
- 1927 The First Auto (story)
- 1927 Old San Francisco
- 1927 The Black Diamond Express (story)
- 1927 Simple Sis (story – as Melville Crossman)
- 1927 Irish Hearts (story – as Melville Crossman)
- 1927 The Missing Link (as Gregory Rogers)
- 1927 Tracked by the Police (Rin Tin Tin story)
- 1927 Wolf's Clothing
- 1926 The Better 'Ole (screenplay)
- 1926 Across the Pacific (adaptation)
- 1926 Footloose Widows
- 1926 The Social Highwayman
- 1926 Oh! What a Nurse! (adaptation)
- 1926 The Little Irish Girl (adaptation)
- 1926 The Caveman (scenario)
- 1925 Three Weeks in Paris (story as Gregory Rogers, screenplay as Darryl Zanuck)
- 1925 Hogan's Alley
- 1925 Seven Sinners
- 1925 Red Hot Tires
- 1925 The Limited Mail
- 1925 Eve's Lover
- 1925 A Broadway Butterfly
- 1925 On Thin Ice (as Gregory Rogers)
- 1924 The Lighthouse by the Sea (Rin Tin Tin story – as Gregory Rogers)
- 1924 The Millionaire Cowboy (story)
- 1924 Find Your Man (Rin Tin Tin story – as Gregory Rogers)
- 1924 For the Love of Mike (Short)
- 1924 Sherlock's Home (Short)
- 1924 William Tells (Short)
- 1924 King Leary (Short)
- 1924 Money to Burns (Short)
- 1924 When Knighthood Was in Tower (Short)
- 1924 Julius Sees Her (Short)
- 1923 Judy Punch (Short)
- 1923 When Gale and Hurricane Meet (Short)
- 1923 The End of a Perfect Fray (Short)
- 1923 Gall of the Wild (Short)
- 1923 Some Punches and Judy (Short)
- 1923 Two Stones with One Bird (Short)
- 1923 Six Second Smith (Short)
- 1923 The Knight That Failed (Short)
- 1923 The Knight in Gale (Short)
- 1923 Fighting Blood
- 1922 The Storm
- 1922 Round Two (Short)

=== Zanuck in documentaries; television appearances ===
- 2013 Don't Say Yes Until I Finish Talking (Documentary)
- 2013 Don't Say No Until I Finish Talking: The Story of Richard D. Zanuck (Documentary)
- 2011 Hollywood Invasion (Documentary)
- 2011 Making the Boys (Documentary)
- 2010 Moguls & Movie Stars: A History of Hollywood (TV documentary)
  - Fade Out, Fade In (uncredited)
  - The Attack of the Small Screens: 1950–1960
- 2009 Coming Attractions: The History of the Movie Trailer (Documentary)
- 2009 1939: Hollywood's Greatest Year (TV documentary)
- 2006 Darryl F. Zanuck: A Dream Fulfilled (TV documentary)
- 2005 Filmmakers vs. Tycoons (Documentary)
- 2003 American Masters (TV documentary)
  - None Without Sin
- Backstory (TV documentary)
  - Gentleman's Agreement (2001)
  - The Longest Day (2000)
- History vs. Hollywood (TV documentary)
  - The Longest Day: A Salute to Courage (2001)
- 2001 Cleopatra: The Film That Changed Hollywood (TV documentary)
- Great Books (TV documentary)
  - The Grapes of Wrath (1999)
- Biography (TV documentary)
  - Anna and the King: The Real Story of Anna Leonowens (1999)
  - Sonja Henie: Fire on Ice (1997)
- 1997 20th Century-Fox: The First 50 Years (TV documentary)
- 1996 Rodgers & Hammerstein: The Sound of Movies (TV documentary)
- 1995 The First 100 Years: A Celebration of American Movies (TV documentary)
- 1995 Darryl F. Zanuck: 20th Century Filmmaker (TV documentary)
- 1995 The Casting Couch (Video documentary)
- 1975 20th Century Fox Presents...A Tribute to Darryl F. Zanuck (TV documentary)
- The David Frost Show (TV)
  - Episode #3.211 (1971)
  - Episode #2.203 (1970)
- 1968 D-Day Revisited (Documentary)
- What's My Line? (TV )
  - Episode September 16, 1962 – Mystery Guest
  - Episode October 5, 1958 – Mystery Guest
- Cinépanorama (TV documentary)
  - Episode 11 (June 1960)
- Small World (TV Series)
  - Episode #1.22 (1959) ... Himself
- The Ed Sullivan Show (TV Series)
  - Episode #11.39 (1958)
- 1954 The CinemaScope Parade
- 1953 Screen Snapshots: Hollywood's Great Entertainers (Short)
- 1950 Screen Snapshots: The Great Showman (Short)
- 1946 Hollywood Park (Short)
- 1943 Show-Business at War (Documentary)
- 1943 At the Front (Documentary)
- 1943 At the Front in North Africa with the U.S. Army (Documentary)
