= Find Your Man =

1924 film by Malcolm St. Clair

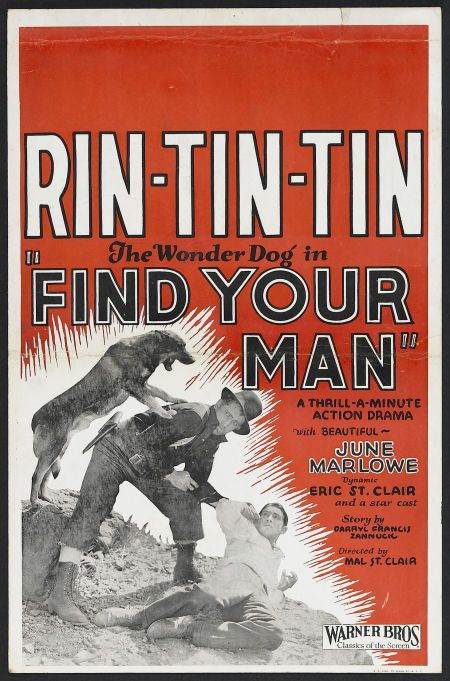
- Theatrical poster
- Directed by: Malcolm St. Clair
- Screenplay by: Darryl F. Zanuck (credited as Gregory Rogers)
- Starring: June Marlowe; Rin Tin Tin
- Cinematography: Lee Garmes
- Production company: Warner Bros.
- Distributed by: Warner Bros.
- Release date: September 1, 1924
- Running time: 70 minutes
- Country: United States
- Languages: Silent; English intertitles
- Budget: $63,000
- Box office: $326,000

Find Your Man is a 1924 American silent action/melodrama film starring Rin Tin Tin and June Marlowe. It was directed by Mal St. Clair who persuaded Warner Bros. to hire his friend, Darryl F. Zanuck, to write the screenplay; this began a long association between Zanuck and Rin Tin Tin. Filming took place in Klamath Falls, Oregon. This film survives. It was transferred onto 16mm film by Associated Artists Productions in the 1950s and shown on television.

Find Your Man was promoted as “wholesome melodrama at its very best.”

== Plot ==
Paul Andrews returns home to the Pacific Northwest after combat service during World War I. During his absence he has lost contact with the girl he loves, Caroline Blair. He embarks on a journey in search of her with his dog Buddy.

After hopping a freight train, they disembark in a lumber camp. Paul and Buddy rescue a young woman from the abusive mill boss, Martin Daines. The girl turns out to be his sweetheart, Caroline. When a murder is committed, Paul is falsely accused: the only witness to the crime is Buddy, and the murderer determines to destroy the intelligent canine, who recognizes the true assailant. Caroline intervenes and saves Buddy. When Martin kills her stepfather, suspicion falls on Paul, but Buddy manages to extract a confession from the murderer. The faithful dog provides evidence at the trial that exonerates his master, proving him man's best friend.

== Cast ==
- June Marlowe as Carolina Blair
- Rin Tin Tin as Buddy, a dog
- Eric St. Clair as Paul Andrews
- Charles Hill Mailes as Gregory Mills
- Pat Hartigan as Martin Dains
- Fred R. Stanton as Sheriff
- Lew Harvey as Half-Breed
- Heinie Conklin as Lumberjack

== Reception ==
The Advertiser praised Rin Tin Tin for his “marvelous athletic stunts” and Eric St. Clair and June Marlowe for their “exceptional skill” in portraying the young lovers.

== Box Office ==
According to Warner Bros records the film earned $283,000 domestically and $43,000 foreign.
