= The Blacksmith =

1922 film

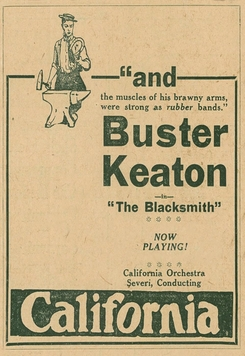
- Promotional advertisement
- Directed by: Buster Keaton; Malcolm St. Clair
- Written by: Buster Keaton; Malcolm St. Clair
- Produced by: Joseph M. Schenck
- Starring: Buster Keaton
- Cinematography: Elgin Lessley
- Distributed by: First National Pictures
- Release date: July 21, 1922
- Running time: 25 minutes
- Country: United States
- Languages: Silent; English intertitles

The Blacksmith is a 1922 American short comedy film co-written, co-directed by Malcolm St. Clair and Buster Keaton and starring Keaton.

The central conflict in The Blacksmith emerges when Keaton, a young blacksmith, struggles to master the shop’s machinery and implements which seem to defy his efforts to control them. Virginia Fox, a pretty elite equestrian, is an unwitting victim of his ineptitude.

== Plot ==
The Blacksmith (1922) by Buster Keaton and Malcolm St. Clair

Buster (Buster Keaton) is an assistant blacksmith who makes horseshoes and repairs automobiles. He finds himself at odds with virtually every inanimate object in the shop: the forge, the blowtorch, the winch, and sledgehammers resist his control. Even a single red-hot horseshoe proves unmanageable. He is dismayed when he inadvertently destroys a Rolls-Royce automobile.

An equestrian gentlewoman (Virginia Fox) arrives to have her snow-white mare re-shod. By the time she departs, Buster has dirtied the equine with black axle grease.

When a giant horseshoe suspended from the ceiling of the shop becomes magnetized, iron objects begin disappearing from the shop floor. Suspecting his assistant of tomfoolery, the enormous senior blacksmith (Joe Roberts), becomes enraged and a fight ensues. A sheriff arrives and his badge disappears, then his pistol. He summons the posse. Buster discovers the secret of the giant horseshoe and disables it: dozens of tools plunge to the floor. The senior blacksmith is escorted to the jail to explain.

== Cast ==
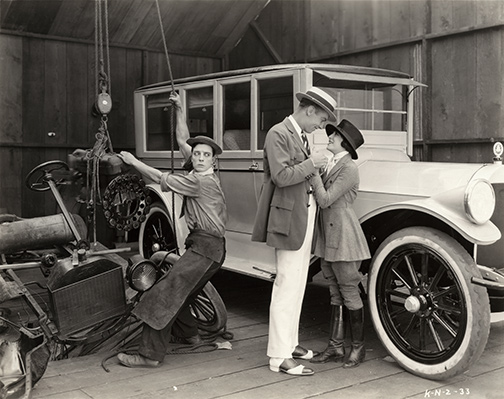
Buster Keaton hoists a Model T engine from a wrecked car as Virginia Fox flirts with an unidentified actor in a scene still for the 1922 comedy short The Blacksmith.

- Buster Keaton as Blacksmith's assistant
- Joe Roberts as Blacksmith
- Virginia Fox as Horsewoman

== Alternate versions ==
In June 2013, Argentine film collector, curator and historian Fernando Martín Peña (who had previously unearthed the complete version of Metropolis) discovered an alternate version of this film, a sort of remake whose last reel differs completely from the previously known version. Film historians have since found evidence that the version of The Blacksmith Peña uncovered was a substantial reshoot undertaken months after completion of principal photography and a preview screening in New York. They now believe the rediscovered version was Keaton's final cut intended for wide distribution.

Following Peña's discovery, a third version of the film, featuring at least one scene which doesn't occur in either of the other two, was found in the collection of former film distributor Blackhawk Films.

== See also ==
- Buster Keaton filmography

== Bibliography ==
- Dwyer, Ruth Anne. 1996. Malcolm St. Clair: His Films, 1915-1948. The Scarecrow Press, Lantham, Md., and London. ISBN 0-810827093
