= Lee Garmes =

American cinematographer (1898–1978)

Lee Garmes, A.S.C.
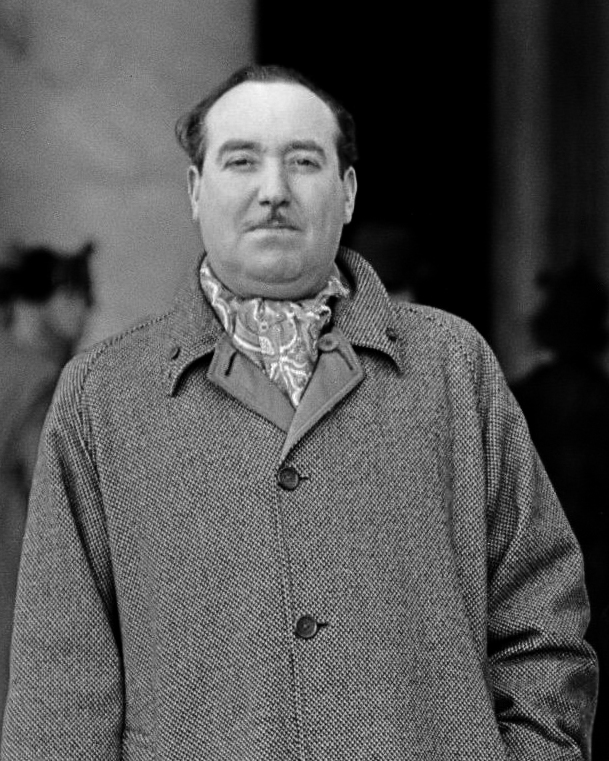
- Garmes in 1937
- Born: Lee Dewey Garmes; May 27, 1898; Peoria, Illinois, U.S.
- Died: August 31, 1978 (aged 80); Los Angeles, California, U.S.
- Occupation: Cinematographer
- Title: A.S.C.
- Board member of: A.S.C. President (1960–1961)
- Spouse: Ruth Hall (1933–his death)
- Children: 2 daughters, Pamela and Carol
- Awards: Academy Award for Best Cinematography; 1932 Shanghai Express

Lee Garmes, A.S.C. (May 27, 1898 – August 31, 1978) was an American cinematographer. During his career, he worked with directors Howard Hawks, Max Ophüls, Josef von Sternberg, Alfred Hitchcock, King Vidor, Nicholas Ray and Henry Hathaway, whom he had met as a young man when the two first came to Hollywood in the silent era. He also co-directed two films with legendary screenwriter Ben Hecht: Angels Over Broadway and Actors and Sin.

== Biography and career ==
Born in Peoria, Illinois, Garmes came to Hollywood in 1916. His first job was as an assistant in the paint department at Thomas H. Ince Studios, but he soon became a camera assistant before graduating to full-time cameraman. His earliest films were comedy shorts, and his career did not fully take off until the introduction of sound films.

Garmes was married to film actress Ruth Hall from 1933 until his death in 1978. He is interred in the Grand View Memorial Park Cemetery in Glendale, California.

Garmes was one of the early proponents of video technology, which he advocated as early as 1972. That year, he had been hired by Technicolor to photograph the short film Why, which was intended to test whether video was a viable technology for shooting feature films.

According to American Cinematographer magazine, "Although officially unaccredited, Lee Garmes photographed a considerable portion of Gone with the Wind. Many consider the famous railroad yard sequence among his finest cinematic efforts."

Declaring that his cinematography can be “followed like a thread” through films he photographed for various directors, Garmes acknowledged his debt to Dutch painter Rembrandt van Rijn:

Rembrandt has been my favorite artist. I’ve always used his technique of north light—of having my main source of light on the set coming from the north…And of course I’ve always followed Rembrandt in my fondness for low key. If you look at his paintings, you’ll see an awful lot of blacks. No strong highlights.

Garmes was one of many Hollywood veterans from the silent era interviewed by Kevin Brownlow for the television series Hollywood (1980).

== Accolades ==
Wins

- Academy Awards: Best Cinematography, for Shanghai Express; 1933.
- Twice received the Eastman Kodak Award.

Nominations

- Academy Awards: Best Cinematography, for Morocco; 1931.
- Academy Awards: Best Cinematography, for Since You Went Away; 1945. Shared with: Stanley Cortez.
- Academy Awards: Best Cinematography, for The Big Fisherman; 1960.

== Filmography ==
- The Hope Chest (1918)
- I'll Get Him Yet (1919)
- Nugget Nell (1919)
- Out of Luck (1919)
- Fighting Blood (1923)
- The Lighthouse by the Sea (1924)
- The Telephone Girl (1924)
- Find Your Man (1924)
- Keep Smiling (1925)
- Goat Getter (1925)
- The Pacemakers (1925)
- Crack o' Dawn (1925)
- A Social Celebrity (1926)
- The Popular Sin (1926)
- The Palm Beach Girl (1926)
- The Show Off (1926)
- The Carnival Girl (1926)
- The Grand Duchess and the Waiter (1926)
- The Garden of Allah (1927)
- The Private Life of Helen of Troy (1927)
- The Love Mart (1927)
- Rose of the Golden West (1927)
- Waterfront (1928)
- Yellow Lily (1928)
- The Barker (1928)
- The Little Shepherd of Kingdom Come (1928)
- His Captive Woman (1929)
- Say It With Songs (1929)
- Love and the Devil (1929)
- The Great Divide (1929)
- Disraeli (1929)
- Prisoners (1929)
- Morocco (1930)
- The Other Tomorrow (1930)
- Lilies of the Field (1930)
- Whoopee! (1930)
- Bright Lights (1930)
- Spring Is Here (1930)
- Song of the Flame (1930)
- City Streets (1931)
- Dishonored (1931)
- An American Tragedy (1931)
- Confessions of a Co-Ed (1931)
- Kiss Me Again (1931)
- Fighting Caravans (1931)
- Call Her Savage (1932)
- Shanghai Express (1932)
- Strange Interlude (1932)
- Scarface (1932)
- Smilin' Through (1932)
- Face in the Sky (1933)
- My Lips Betray (1933)
- Zoo in Budapest (1933)
- Shanghai Madness (1933)
- George White's Scandals of 1934 (1934)
- Crime Without Passion (1934)
- The Nephew of Paris (1934)
- I Am Suzanne (1934)
- Once in a Blue Moon (1935)
- Dreaming Life (1935)
- The Scoundrel (1935)
- Miss Bracegirdle Does Her Duty (1936)
- The Lilac Domino (1937)
- Dreaming Lips (1937)
- The Sky's the Limit (1938)
- Gone with the Wind (1939)
- Beyond Tomorrow (1940) (Producer only)
- Jungle Book (1942)
- Lydia (1941)
- China Girl (1942)
- Footlight Serenade (1942)
- Jack London (1943)
- Stormy Weather (1943)
- Forever and a Day (1943)
- Flight for Freedom (1943)
- Guest in the House (1944)
- Since You Went Away (1944)
- None Shall Escape (1944)
- Paris Underground (1945)
- Love Letters (1945)
- Young Widow (1946)
- Duel in the Sun (1946)
- The Searching Wind (1946)
- Specter of the Rose (1946)
- The Secret Life of Walter Mitty (1947)
- The Paradine Case (1947)
- Nightmare Alley (1947)
- The Fighting Kentuckian (1949)
- Roseanna McCoy (1949)
- My Foolish Heart (1949)
- Caught (1949)
- Our Very Own (1950)
- My Friend Irma Goes West (1950)
- Detective Story (1951)
- Saturday's Hero (1951)
- That's My Boy (1951)
- Actors and Sin (1952)
- The Captive City (1952)
- The Lusty Men (1952)
- Outlaw Territory (1953)
- Thunder in the East (1953)
- Hannah Lee (1953)
- Abdulla the Great (1954)
- The Desperate Hours (1955)
- Man with the Gun (1955)
- Land of the Pharaohs (1955)
- The Bottom of the Bottle (1956)
- The Sharkfighters (1956)
- D-Day the Sixth of June (1956)
- The Big Boodle (1956)
- Never Love a Stranger (1958)
- Happy Anniversary (1959)
- The Big Fisherman (1959)
- Misty (1961)
- Hemingway's Adventures of a Young Man (1962)
- Ten Girls Ago (1962)
- Lady in a Cage (1964)
- A Big Hand for the Little Lady (1966)
- How to Save a Marriage and Ruin Your Life (1968)
- Why (1972)
- Shame, Shame on the Bixby Boys (1978) [special thanks]
