= Higgins Family =

The Higgins Family films was Republic Pictures' response to Metro-Goldwyn-Mayer's popular Andy Hardy series, as well as 20th Century Fox's Jones Family series. Nine films were released between 1938 and 1941.

In the first seven movies, James Gleason, his wife Lucile and their son Russell played Joe, Lillian, and Sydney Higgins. In contrast, Harry Davenport played Grandpa (though his name changed from William Jordan in The Higgins Family to Higgins in Should Husbands Work? to Ed Carson the rest of the time). In the last two, they were all replaced, by Roscoe Karns, Ruth Donnelly, George Ernest and Spencer Charters, respectively. Tommy Ryan played Tommy in the second through sixth movies. Betty was played by Mary Beth Hughes in the fourth and Lois Ranson in the last five. Lynne Roberts played Marian in the first, then Jean for the second and third.

Gus Meins directed all of the Gleason pictures, and produced some of the later ones.

== Films ==
- The Higgins Family (1938)
- My Wife's Relatives (1939)
- Should Husbands Work? (1939)
- The Covered Trailer (1939)
- Money to Burn (1939)
- Grandpa Goes to Town (1940)
- Earl of Puddlestone (1940)
- Meet the Missus (1940)
- Petticoat Politics (1941)
