= Meet the Missus =

Meet the Missus may refer to:

- Meet the Missus (1929 film), an Al Christie production
- Meet the Missus (1937 film), an American comedy directed by Joseph Santley
- Meet the Missus (1940 film), an American comedy directed by Malcolm St. Clair
