= Lois Ranson =

American actress (1921–2021)

- Born: Lois Ranson; November 7, 1921; Los Angeles
- Died: July 4, 2021 (aged 99); USA
- Occupation: Actress
- Years active: 1939–1943
- Spouse: Charles Abbott Root
- Children: 2

Lois Ranson (November 7, 1921 – July 4, 2021) was an American film actress who worked from 1939 to 1943, appearing in Western films and serials.

Ranson was born on November 7, 1921, in Los Angeles, California.

She was in 15 films, including Under Texas Skies (1940) in which she was the female lead alongside The Three Mesquiteers. She made five appearances in the Higgins Family series, playing the part of Betty Higgins.

Ranson was married to Charles Abbott Root, and they had a daughter and a son.

Ranson died on July 4, 2021.

== Filmography ==
- Winter Carnival (1939) as Patsy (uncredited)
- What a Life (1939) as student (uncredited)
- Money to Burn (1939) as Betty Higgins
- Grandpa Goes to Town (1940) as Betty Higgins
- The Crooked Road (1940) as street girl (uncredited)
- Grand Ole Opry (1940) as Susie Ann Weaver
- Earl of Puddlestone (1940) as Betty Higgins
- Under Texas Skies (1940) as Helen Smith
- Friendly Neighbors (1940) as Nancy Williams
- Meet the Missus (1940) as Betty Higgins
- Cheers for Miss Bishop (1941) as Gretchen Clark
- Petticoat Politics (1941) as Betty Higgins
- Angels with Broken Wings (1941) as Lois Wilson
- Pierre of the Plains (1942) as Clara
- The Renegade (1943) as Julie Martin
