= Sterling Holloway =

American actor (1905–1992)

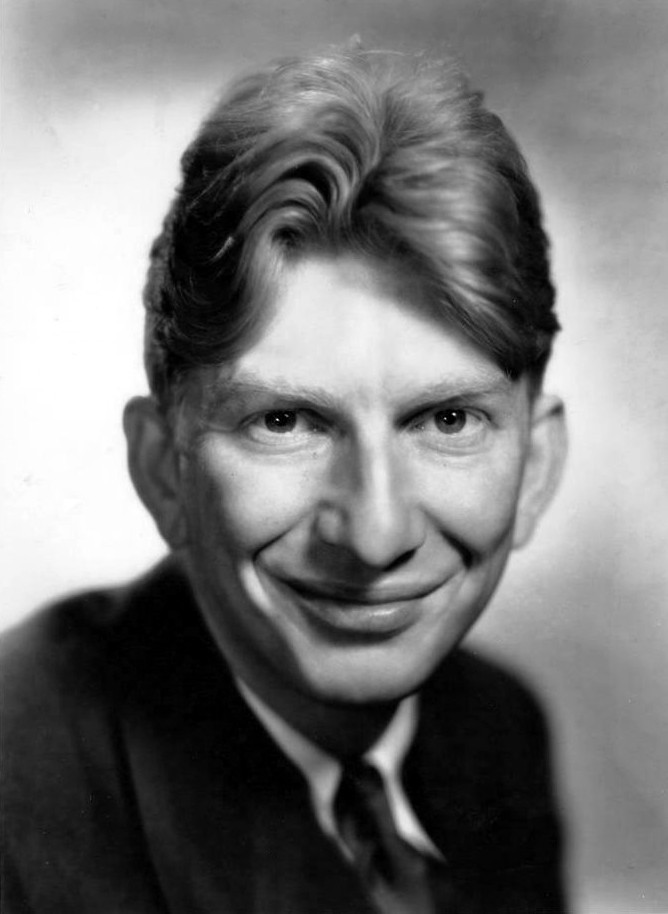
- Holloway, circa 1930s
- Born: Sterling Price Holloway Jr. January 14, 1905 (Note: Despite an Associated Press obituary, his birth record, and draft card all stating a January 14 birth date, some authority control databases erroneously report a January 4th birth date.); Cedartown, Georgia, U.S.
- Died: November 22, 1992 (aged 87); Los Angeles, California, U.S.
- Occupation: Actor
- Years active: 1925–1986
- Children: 1

Sterling Price Holloway Jr. (January 14, 1905 – November 22, 1992) was an American actor who appeared in over 100 films and 40 television shows. He did voice acting for The Walt Disney Company, playing Mr. Stork in Dumbo, Adult Flower in Bambi, the Cheshire Cat in Alice in Wonderland, Kaa in The Jungle Book, Roquefort the Mouse in The Aristocats, and the title character in Winnie the Pooh, among many others.

== Early life ==
Born in Cedartown, Georgia, on January 14, 1905, Holloway was named after his father, Sterling Price Holloway, who, in turn, was named after a prominent Confederate general, Sterling "Pap" Price. His mother was Rebecca DeHaven Boothby. He had a younger brother named Boothby. The family owned a grocery store in Cedartown, where his father served as mayor in 1912. After attending Georgia Military Academy, he left Georgia in 1920 at the age of fifteen and went to New York City, where he attended the American Academy of Dramatic Arts. While there, he befriended actor Spencer Tracy, whom he considered one of his favorite working colleagues.

== Career ==
=== Stage ===
In his late teens, Holloway toured with the stock company of The Shepherd of the Hills, performing in one-nighters across much of the American West before returning to New York where he performed with the Theatre Guild production of Fata Morgana and appeared in the Rodgers and Hart revue The Garrick Gaieties in the mid-1920s. A talented singer, he introduced "Manhattan" in 1925 and the following year sang "Mountain Greenery".

=== Films and shorts ===
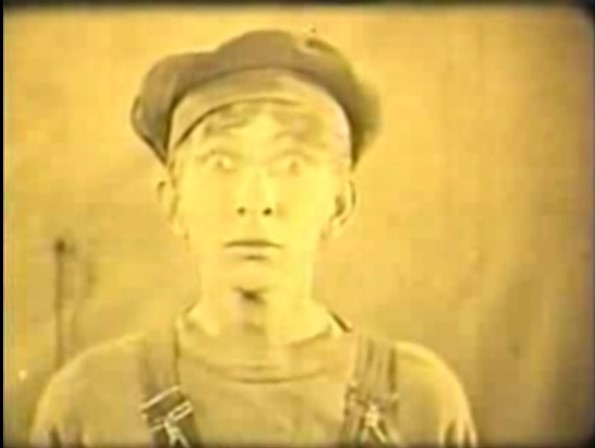
Holloway in The Battling Kangaroo (1926)

He moved to Hollywood in 1926 to begin a film career that lasted almost fifty years. His bushy red hair and foggy distinctive voice meant that he almost always appeared in comedies. His first film was The Battling Kangaroo (1926), a silent picture. Over the following decades, Holloway would appear with Fred MacMurray, Barbara Stanwyck, Lon Chaney Jr., Clark Gable, Joan Crawford, Bing Crosby, and John Carradine. In 1942, during World War II, Holloway enlisted in the United States Army at the age of 37 and was assigned to the Special Services. He helped develop a show called "Hey Rookie", which ran for nine months and raised $350,000 for the Army Relief Fund. In 1945, Holloway played the role of a medic assigned to an infantry platoon in the critically acclaimed film A Walk in the Sun. Between 1946 and 1947, he played the comic sidekick in five Gene Autry Westerns. His final film role was Hobe Carpenter, a friendly moonshiner who helps Harley Thomas (David Carradine) in Thunder and Lightning (1977).

=== With Walt Disney ===
Walt Disney originally considered Holloway for the voice of Sleepy in Snow White and the Seven Dwarfs (1937), but chose Pinto Colvig instead. Holloway's voice work in animated films began with Dumbo (1941), as the voice of Mr. Stork. Holloway was the voice of the adult Flower in Bambi (1942), the narrator of the Antarctic penguin sequence in The Three Caballeros (1944), and the narrator in the Peter and the Wolf sequence of Make Mine Music (1946). He was the voice of the Cheshire Cat in Alice in Wonderland (1951); the narrator in The Little House (1952), Susie the Little Blue Coupe (1952), Lambert the Sheepish Lion (1952), and Goliath II (1960); Amos Mouse from Ben and Me (1953); Kaa the snake in The Jungle Book (1967); and Roquefort the mouse in The Aristocats (1970). He is perhaps best remembered as the voice of Winnie the Pooh in Disney's Winnie the Pooh featurettes through 1977. He was honored as a Disney Legend in 1991, the first person to receive the award in the voice category. A majority of his roles were inherited by voice actor Jim Cummings following his death.

=== Radio and recordings ===
Holloway acted on many radio programs, including The Railroad Hour, The United States Steel Hour, Suspense, Lux Radio Theater, and The Shadow. In the late 1940s, he could be heard in various roles on NBC's "Fibber McGee and Molly". His voice retained a touch of its Southern drawl and was instantly recognizable. Holloway was chosen to narrate many children's records, including Uncle Remus Stories (Decca), Mother Goose Nursery Rhymes (Disneyland Records), Walt Disney Presents Rudyard Kipling's Just So Stories (Disneyland Records), and Peter And The Wolf (RCA Victor).

=== Television ===
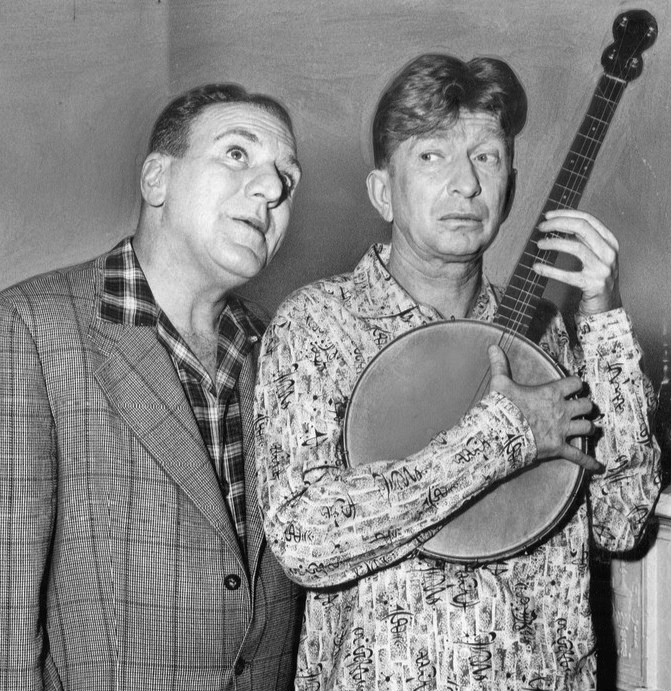
Holloway with William Bendix on The Life of Riley, 1957

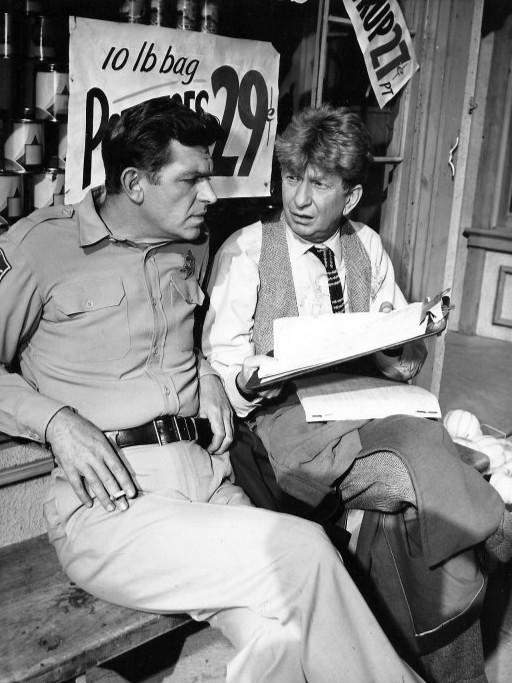
Holloway with Andy Griffith on The Andy Griffith Show, 1962

Holloway easily made the transition from radio to television. He appeared on the Adventures of Superman as "Uncle Oscar", an eccentric inventor, and played a recurring role on The Life of Riley. He guest-starred on Fred Waring's CBS television program in the 1950s and appeared on Circus Boy as a hot air balloonist. Some other series on which he performed include Five Fingers (episode "The Temple of the Swinging Doll"), The Untouchables, The Real McCoys ("The Jinx"), Hazel, Pete and Gladys, The Twilight Zone ("What's in the Box"), The Brothers Brannagan, Gilligan's Island, The Andy Griffith Show, The Donald O'Connor Show, Peter Gunn, F Troop, and Moonlighting.

In the late 1950s and early 1960s, Holloway had live parts in two of The Bell System Science Series educational films, and a voice part in a third. In 1969, Holloway narrated a summary of the Super Bowl III game, titled Joe and the Magic Bean, with “Joe” being New York Jets player Joe Namath, and the “magic bean” being the football.

During the 1970s, Holloway did commercial voice-overs for Purina Puppy Chow dog food and sang their familiar jingle, "Puppy Chow/For a full year/Till he's full-grown!" He also provided the voice for Woodsy Owl in several 1970s and 1980s United States Forest Service commercials. He auditioned for the well-known comic book character Garfield in 1982, but lost to Lorenzo Music. He provided voice-over work for the 1984 commercial of Libby's baked beans.

== Personal life and death ==
Throughout his life, Holloway remained a bachelor. He once said this was because he felt lacking in nothing and did not wish to disturb his pattern of life. He adopted a son, Richard Holloway.

Fellow Winnie the Pooh cast member Hal Smith (who originated the character Owl) had taken over the role of Winnie the Pooh for the 1981 short Winnie the Pooh Discovers the Seasons. Holloway was given an audition to return to the role for The New Adventures of Winnie the Pooh, which turned out to be a perfunctory offer as the producers believed he was too old to handle the strain of recording a full series (an assumption that angered Holloway's agent) even though he was still capable of performing the voice; Jim Cummings took over the role as well as most of Holloway's other voice roles, including Kaa in Jungle Cubs and The Jungle Book 2. As late as 1991, Berkeley Breathed had shown interest in hiring Holloway to voice Opus the Penguin for his animated adaptation of A Wish for Wings That Work; for reasons unknown, Breathed was unable to contact Holloway, and Michael Bell voiced the character instead. Holloway died of a cardiac arrest at the Good Samaritan Hospital on November 22, 1992. He was cremated and his ashes were scattered in the Pacific Ocean.

As a staunch, life-long Republican, Holloway consistently endorsed the party's presidential nominees across more than four decades of shifting American political landscapes. His voting record spanned from supporting the internationalist vision of Wendell Willkie and Thomas E. Dewey in the 1940s, to breaking his public silence to campaign for General Dwight D. Eisenhower in the 1950s. His alliance continued through the modern conservative movement as he supported Barry Goldwater in 1964, voted for Richard Nixon and Gerald Ford in the 1970s, and Ronald Reagan in the 1980s. Beyond casting his private ballots, Holloway helped organise fundraisers for the Hollywood Republican Committee. Furthermore, he associated himself with prominent industry figures like Walt Disney and other fellow conservative colleagues as a member of the anti-communist Motion Picture Alliance for the Preservation of American Ideals.

Raised spiritually within the Cedartown First Methodist Church in his native Cedartown, Georgia, Holloway was a lifelong parishoner of the Methodist Church. He later attended Hollywood United Methodist Church. His Christian faith was a part of his personal life, and he was known for his gentle, distinctive voice and expressive performances.

=== Art collection ===
Holloway was an avid art collector, important in the early careers of many local Los Angeles area artists such as Edward Kienholz and Billy Al Bengston. His large, eclectic, and mostly contemporary collection was sold off piecemeal prior to his death due to his failing health. The collection was a central element in his life outside of his work, building his home on a hillside overlooking the Pacific Ocean in Laguna Beach, California to serve primarily as a gallery in which to display his collection. His instructions to his architect, Paul Sterling Hoag, were that it should be the home "primarily for his paintings and sculpture and only secondarily for himself." The design of the house included unique elements such as large built-in flat file drawers to hold prints and other unmounted works from his collection as well as features specifically designated for certain notable artworks, such as the commissioned revolving wooden sunshade panels made by Robert Cremean which faced the setting sun, and sculptured front doors by John Mason. The whole layout of the house was optimized for the appreciation of the displayed works of art, more similar to the design of a gallery than a home.

== Filmography ==
=== Feature films ===
- Casey at the Bat (1927) as Elmer Putnam
- American Madness (1932) as Oscar (uncredited)
- Blonde Venus (1932) as Joe, Hiker (uncredited)
- Faithless (1932) as Photographer (uncredited)
- Rockabye (1932) as Speakeasy Pianist (uncredited)
- Lawyer Man (1932) as Olga's Dining Friend (uncredited)
- Hard to Handle (1933) as Andy Heaney (uncredited)
- Blondie Johnson (1933) as Red Charley
- Fast Workers (1933) as Pinky Magoo
- Hell Below (1933) as Seaman Jenks
- Elmer, the Great (1933) as Nick Kane
- Picture Snatcher (1933) as Journalism Student (uncredited)
- Adorable (1933) as Emile, Karl's Valet (uncredited)
- International House (1933) as Sailor
- Gold Diggers of 1933 (1933) as Second Hat Delivery Boy (uncredited)
- Professional Sweetheart (1933) as Stu
- When Ladies Meet (1933) as Jerome – the Caddy (uncredited)
- Wild Boys of the Road (1933) as Ollie, another hobo
- Dancing Lady (1933) as Pinky – the Show's Author
- Advice to the Lovelorn (1933) as Benny
- Alice in Wonderland (1933) as Frog
- Going Hollywood (1933) as Radio Remote Technician (uncredited)
- The Cat and the Fiddle (1934) as Flower Messenger (uncredited)
- Strictly Dynamite (1934) as Elmer Fleming
- Back Page (1934) as Bill Giddings
- Operator 13 (1934) as Wounded Union Soldier (uncredited)
- Murder in the Private Car (1934) as Office Boy (uncredited)
- Tomorrow's Children (1934) as Dr. Dorsey
- Down to Their Last Yacht (1934) as Freddy Finn
- Gift of Gab (1934) as Sound Effects Man
- The Merry Widow (1934) as Mischka the orderly
- Girl o' My Dreams (1934) as Spec Early
- A Wicked Woman (1934) as Peter
- Lottery Lover (1935) as Cadet Harold Stump
- Life Begins at 40 (1935) as Chris
- Doubting Thomas (1935) as Mr. Spindler
- I Live My Life (1935) as Max
- 1,000 Dollars A Minute (1935) as Pete
- Rendezvous (1935) as Taxi Driver (uncredited)
- Palm Springs (1936) as Oscar
- Career Woman (1936) as George Rogers
- Join the Marines (1937) as Alfred, the Steward
- Maid of Salem (1937) as Miles Corbin – Cow Herder
- When Love Is Young (1937) as Orville Kane
- The Woman I Love (1937) as Duprez
- Varsity Show (1937) as Trout
- Behind the Mike (1937) as Tommy Astor
- Of Human Hearts (1938) as Chauncey Ames
- Doctor Rhythm (1938) as Luke (Ice-Cream Man)
- Held for Ransom (1938) as RFD Mailman (uncredited)
- Professor Beware (1938) as The Groom
- Spring Madness (1938) as Buck
- St. Louis Blues (1939) as Boatman (uncredited)
- East Side of Heaven (1939) as Accordion player (uncredited)
- Nick Carter, Master Detective (1939) as Bee-Catcher
- The Blue Bird (1940) as Wild Plum
- Remember the Night (1940) as Willie
- Hit Parade of 1941 (1940) as Soda Jerk
- Street of Memories (1940) as Student Barber
- Little Men (1940) as Reporter
- Cheers for Miss Bishop (1941) as Chris Jensen
- Meet John Doe (1941) as Dan
- The Great Awakening (1941) as Otto, the bookkeeper
- Top Sergeant Mulligan (1941) as Frank Snark
- Dumbo (1941) as Mr. Stork (voice)
- Look Who's Laughing (1941) as Rusty, Soda Jerk (uncredited)
- Don't Get Personal (1942) as Lucky
- The Lady Is Willing (1942) as Arthur Miggle (uncredited)
- Star Spangled Rhythm (1942) as Sterling - 'Sweater, Sarong & Peekaboo Bang' number
- Bambi (1942) as Adult Flower (voice, uncredited)
- Iceland (1942) as Sverdrup Svenssen
- Here We Go Again (1942) as Tommy, Western Union Messenger (uncredited)
- The Three Caballeros (1944) as Prof. Holloway (voice)
- Wildfire (1945) as Alkali Jones
- A Walk in the Sun (1945) as McWilliams
- Make Mine Music (1946) as Narrator (segment "Peter and the Wolf") (voice)
- Death Valley (1946) as Slim
- Sioux City Sue (1946) as Nellie Bly
- Her Wonderful Lie (1947)
- Trail to San Antone (1947) as Droopy Stearns
- Twilight on the Rio Grande (1947) as Pokie
- Saddle Pals (1947) as Waldo T. Brooks Jr.
- Robin Hood of Texas (1947) as Droopy Haynes
- Addio Mimí! (1949) as Aristide
- The Beautiful Blonde from Bashful Bend (1949) as Basserman Boy
- Alice in Wonderland (1951) as Cheshire Cat (voice)
- Kentucky Rifle (1955) as Lon Setter
- Shake, Rattle and Rock! (1956) as Albert 'Axe' McAllister
- The Adventures of Huckleberry Finn (1960) as Barber
- Alakazam the Great (1960) as Narrator (English version, voice)
- My Six Loves (1963) as Oliver Dodds (uncredited)
- It's a Mad, Mad, Mad, Mad World (1963) as Fire Chief
- Batman (1966; deleted scenes)
- The Jungle Book (1967) as Kaa, The Snake (voice)
- Live a Little, Love a Little (1968) as Milkman
- The Aristocats (1970) as Roquefort, The Mouse (voice)
- Cries (1975) as Narrator
- Super Seal (1976) as Cap'n Zach
- Won Ton Ton, the Dog Who Saved Hollywood (1976) as Old Man on Bus
- The Many Adventures of Winnie the Pooh (1977) as Winnie the Pooh (voice)
- Thunder & Lightning (1977) as Hobe Carpenter

=== Short subjects ===
- The Battling Kangaroo (1926) as Napoleon French
- The Girl from Everywhere (1927) as Assistant Director
- The Girl from Nowhere (1928) as Minor Role (uncredited)
- One Track Minds (1933) as Train Snack Salesman
- Not the Marrying Kind (1933)
- Meeting Mazie (1933)
- Born April First (1934)
- Pleasing Grandpa (1934)
- Picnic Perils (1934)
- Sterling's Rival Romeo (1934) as Sterling
- Father Knows Best (1935) as Bashful Boy
- My Girl Sally (1935)
- Bring 'Em Back A Lie (1935)
- Double Crossed (1935)
- His Last Fling (1935)
- The Pelican & The Snipe (1944) as Narrator (voice, uncredited)
- The Cold-Blooded Penguin (1944) as Narrator (voice)
- Unusual Occupations L-5-2 (1945) as Himself
- Peter & The Wolf (1946) as Narrator (voice)
- Moron Than Off (1946) as Elmer Fossdinkle
- Mr. Wright Goes Wrong (1946)
- Scooper Dooper (1947) as Himself
- Hectic Honeymoon (1947) as Eddie Jones
- Mickey and the Beanstalk (1947) as Narrator
- Speaking of Animals No. Y7-1: Dog Crazy (1947) as Dog Owner
- Man or Mouse (1948) as Elmer Dinkle
- Flat Feat (1948) as Officer Sterling Smith / Smith's Father
- Lambert the Sheepish Lion (1952) as Narrator / Mr. Stork (voice)
- Susie the Little Blue Coupe (1952) as Narrator (voice)
- The Little House (1952) as Narrator
- Ben and Me (1953) as Amos Mouse (voice)
- Goliath II (1960) as Narrator (voice)
- Winnie the Pooh and the Honey Tree (1966) as Winnie the Pooh (voice)
- Winnie the Pooh and the Blustery Day (1968) as Winnie the Pooh (voice)
- Man, Monsters & Mysteries (1974) as Nessie (voice)
- Winnie the Pooh and Tigger Too (1974) as Winnie the Pooh (voice)
- "Winnie the Pooh: The Story Behind the Masterpiece" (2001) (documentary, archive footage)
- Once Upon a Studio (2023) as Cheshire Cat, Kaa, and Winnie the Pooh (voice, archive audio)

=== Television ===
- Adventures of Superman (1953–55) as Prof. Oscar Quinn / Prof. Twiddle
- The Life of Riley (1953–56) as Waldo Binny
- The Adventures of Ozzie & Harriet (episode "Pancake Mix"; 1953) as Groceryman
- Willy (1955) as Harvey Evelyn
- Our Mr. Sun (1956) as Chloro Phyll (voice, uncredited)
- The Adventures of Rin Tin Tin (3 episodes; 1956–58) as Sorrowful Joe Jackson
- Climax! (episode "Night of a Rebel"; 1957) as Tobias
- Hemo the Magnificent (1957) as Lab Assistant (uncredited)
- Circus Boy (3 episodes; 1957) as Elmer Purdy
- Five Fingers (episode "The Temple of the Swinging Doll"; 1959) as Hayden
- The Untouchables (episode "The Unhired Assassin"; 1960) as Horace De Vilbill
- Peter Gunn (episode "The Best Laid Plans"; 1960) as Felony
- The Real McCoys (episode "The Jinx"; 1960) as Orval McCoy
- Shirley Temple's Storybook (episode "The Land of Oz"; 1960) as Jack Pumpkinhead
- The Brothers Brannagan (episode "Love Me, Love My. Dog"; 1960) as Shopkeeper
- Zane Grey Theatre (episode "Blood Red"; 1961) as Luther
- Pete and Gladys (episode "The Projectionist"; 1961) as Lester Smith
- Miami Undercover (episode "Room 9"; 1961) as Henry
- Margie (episode "False Alarm"; 1962) as Bettenhouse
- The Andy Griffith Show (episode "The Merchant of Mayberry"; 1962) as Bert
- The Lloyd Bridges Show (episode "The Sound of Angels"; 1962) as Blind Man
- The Joey Bishop Show (episode "Joey's Lost What-Cha-Ma-Call-It"; 1963) as Mr. Holland
- Hazel (episode "The Retiring Milkman"; 1963) as Claude the Milkman
- The Twilight Zone (episode "What's in the Box"; 1964) as TV Repairman
- The Restless Sea (1964) as Mr. H2O (voice)
- Linus the Lionhearted (1964) as Sugar Bear / Lovable Yours Truly (voice)
- Burke's Law (episode "Who Killed Annie Foran?"; 1964) as Fisk
- The Baileys of Balboa (1964–65) as Buck Singleton
- Please Don't Eat the Daisies (episode "My Son, the Genius"; 1966) as Mr. Corey
- F Troop (episode "Wilton the Kid"; 1966) as Sheriff Pat Lawton
- That Girl (episode "Phantom of the Horse Opera"; 1966) as Everett Valentine
- Family Affair (episode "Fancy Free"; 1967) as Mr. Frack
- Gilligan's Island (episode "The Pigeon"; 1967) as Burt
- Daktari (episode "Judy and the Jailbirds"; 1967) as Duke
- It Takes a Thief (episode "Rock-Bye, Bye, Baby"; 1969) as Elmo
- Joe and the Magic Bean (1969) as game narrator
- NBC Children's Theatre (episode "All About Me"; 1973) as Colonel Corpuscle (voice)
- Love, American Style (segment "Love and the Face Bow"; 1973) as Dr. Edwin Muller
- Tony the Pony (1976) as GG, the Wizard
- Tukiki and His Search for a Merry Christmas (1979) as Northwind (voice)
- Federal Budget Review (1980) as Man in Washington
- We Think the World Is Round (1984) as Pegleg Pelican (voice)
- Moonlighting (episode "Atomic Shakespeare"; 1986) as Narrator (voice)

== Discography ==
- ”Cold Blooded Penguin” (1944) as Narrator
- ”The Three Caballeros” (1944) as Narrator
- Uncle Remus Stories (Decca, 1947) as Narrator
- Peter and the Wolf (RCA Victor, 1949) as Narrator
- Alice in Wonderland (RCA Victor, 1951) as the Cheshire Cat
- Susie, the Little Blue Coupe (Decca, 1952) as Narrator
- The Little House (Decca, 1952) as Narrator
- The Sorcerer's Apprentice/Peter and the Wolf (Disneyland, 1958) as Narrator
- The Country Cousin (Disneyland, 1959) as Narrator
- Goliath II (Disneyland, 1960) as Narrator
- The Grasshopper and the Ants (Disneyland, 1960) as Narrator (also writer)
- The Stories and Songs of Walt Disney's Three Little Pigs (Disneyland, 1961) as Narrator
- The Absent Minded Professor (Disneyland, 1961) as Narrator
- The Best Stories of Aesop (Disneyland, 1961) as Narrator
- Mother Goose Nursery Rhymes (Disneyland, 1963) as Narrator
- Rudyard Kipling's Just So Stories (Disneyland, 1964) as Narrator
- Winnie the Pooh and the Honey Tree (Disneyland, 1965) as Winnie the Pooh
- A Happy Birthday Party with Winnie the Pooh (Disneyland, 1966) as Winnie the Pooh
- Winnie the Pooh and the Blustery Day (Disneyland, 1967) as Winnie the Pooh/Narrator
- Winnie the Pooh and the North Pole Expotition (Disneyland, 1968) as Winnie the Pooh/Narrator
- Winnie the Pooh and Tigger (Disneyland, 1968) as Winnie the Pooh/Narrator
- Winnie the Pooh and the Heffalumps (Disneyland, 1968) as Winnie the Pooh/Narrator
- The Aristocats (Disneyland, 1970) as Roquefort
- Winnie the Pooh and Tigger Too (Disneyland, 1974) as Winnie the Pooh
- Winnie the Pooh for President (Disneyland, 1976) as Winnie the Pooh

== Sources ==
- Rothel, David. 1984. Those Great Cowboy Sidekicks. Scarecrow Press, Metuchen, New Jersey; ISBN 0-8108-1707-1

Preceded by None	Voice of Winnie the Pooh; 1966–1977	Succeeded by Hal Smith
