= Don Sebastian =

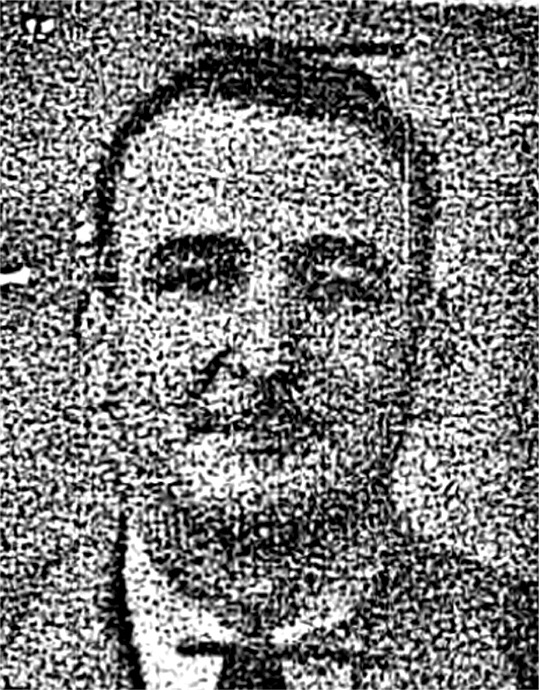
- Born: Luis Héctor Monge-Tamayo; June 28, 1911; Ures, Sonora, Mexico
- Died: November 30, 1987 (aged 76); Los Angeles, California
- Occupations: Professional wrestler, actor
- Spouses: Blanche Cordell; Lois Brooks; Lynne Roberts

Don Louis Sebastian (born Luis Héctor Monge-Tamayo, and sometimes billed as Don Carlos Sebastian or Don Juan Sebastian) was a professional wrestler, a wrestling promoter, a movie actor, and the fourth husband of B-movie heroine Lynne Roberts. A native of Mexico, he later immigrated to the United States, where he became a naturalized citizen.

== Origins ==
Don Sebastian, 1976

Sebastian was born in Ures, Sonora, Mexico, in 1911. In contemporaneous newspaper reports, he was said to have attended high school in Nogales, Arizona. He told reporters he had worked as a bullfighter in Mexico City before becoming a wrestler. He was also praised for his impressive skills as a typist.

== Career ==
By the late 1930s, Don Sebastian—billed as a "Basque wrestler," a "Portuguese-Spanish wrestler," and a "refugee from the Spanish wars"—was wrestling in Mexico and the United States. He actually got his start as a masked professional wrestler in Mexico City.

In the 1940s, he promoted wrestling in Santa Barbara County, California, where he resided at the time. In the 1950s, he leased a space in San Bernardino, California, where he hosted wrestling events and amateur boxing.

He was playing bit parts in films by the 1940s and performing as a singer around the Los Angeles area; he later played bigger film roles in the 1970s and 1980s. He reportedly worked as a stuntman double for Erroll Flynn in the 1930s and 1940s as well.

== Personal life ==
Don Sebastian married Blanche Cordell in 1949 in Ventura, California; they divorced in 1958. He married Lois Brooks in 1965 in Los Angeles. He married Lynne Roberts in 1971, but was legally separated from her at the time of her death.

He died in Los Angeles in 1987 and is buried in Forest Lawn Memorial Park, Glendale.

== Selected filmography ==
- Thieves and Robbers (1983)
- Super Fuzz (1980)
- Hollywood Man (1976)
- Mako: The Jaws of Death (1976)
- How Do I Love Thee? (1970)
