= Super Fuzz =

1980 film directed by Sergio Corbucci

- Italian theatrical release poster by Renato Casaro
- Italian: Poliziotto superpiù
- Directed by: Sergio Corbucci
- Written by: Sergio Corbucci; Sabatino Ciuffini
- Screenplay by: Sergio Corbucci; Sabatino Ciuffini
- Produced by: Vittorio Galiano; Josi W. Konski
- Starring: Terence Hill; Ernest Borgnine; Joanne Dru; Marc Lawrence
- Cinematography: Silvano Ippoliti
- Edited by: Eugenio Alabiso
- Music by: La Bionda
- Production companies: Trans Cinema TV; TVI; El Pico S.A.
- Distributed by: Consorzio Italiano Distributori Indipendenti Film (Italy); Warner Bros. Pictures (international)
- Release dates: 18 September 1980 (West Germany); 30 October 1980 (Italy)
- Running time: 97 minutes
- Countries: Italy; Spain

Super Fuzz (Italian: Poliziotto superpiù, also known as Super Snooper) is a 1980 superhero comedy film co-written and directed by Sergio Corbucci, and starring Terence Hill, Ernest Borgnine, Marc Lawrence and Joanne Dru in her final film role. Hill portrays Dave Speed, a bumbling Miami police officer who gains superpowers through an accidental nuclear exposure.

== Plot ==
Coming fresh from the police academy, Dave Speed is sent to deliver a parking ticket to a member of a tiny Native American village in the Florida Everglades. Unbeknownst to him, the U.S. government and NASA are preparing to conduct a secret radiation experiment by firing a nuclear missile loaded with red plutonium into the village, which has been evacuated. After Dave arrives at the village, he is hit by the radiation, but survives and returns to civilization. His tale of having been close to the explosion is marveled at by most, but dismissed by Sergeant Willy Dunlop, his partner and friend.

Dave soon discovers that he has picked up a wide range of superpowers, including super reflexes and speed, endurance, strength, telekinesis, precognition, intuitive perception, hypnotism, telepathy, invulnerability, and much, much more. He is puzzled, however, by the fact that at seemingly random times, his powers suddenly fail to work for no apparent reason. Despite this, his powers enable him to discover a counterfeit money operation taking place in the city, which he learns is the work of a local businessman named Torpedo and his mistress Rosie Labouche, a former actress on whom Dunlop has a serious crush. Dave is less a danger to them, however, than an old retired magician named Silvius, who, after having inadvertently discovered Torpedo's counterfeit scheme, now finds himself chased by Torpedo's henchmen. When Dave sees them in pursuit of Silvius, he dispatches them and then asks Silvius. From Silvius' revelation, Dave realizes that his powers are neutralized whenever he sees the same color - namely red - that he saw during the explosion.

Dave reveals his secret to Dunlop and Evelyn, Dunlop's niece and his girlfriend, whose reactions are less than enthusiastic. While Dunlop points out that Dave's instinctive abilities are unlikely to be admitted as evidence in court, Evelyn does not enjoy having a too-perfect man in the house. One night, Dave and Dunlop go to Torpedo's clubhouse, where Dave has Dunlop dance with Rosie (with some hypnotic encouragement) while he poses as a corrupt cop who wants a share of the winnings. By using his hypnotic powers on Torpedo, he gets the gangster to blab out the location of his printing facility, the fishing trawler Barracuda. But in the meantime, Dunlop inadvertently tells Rosie about Dave's powers and weaknesses in order to impress her.

Once the information is obtained, Dave and Dunlop proceed out to sea to find the Barracuda. Going aboard alone, Dunlop finds the printing press and the latest stash of dud money, but is knocked out by Torpedo's men, who lock him into a freezer and then sink the trawler to destroy the evidence. Upon his return to police headquarters, Dave is arrested following a trumped-up accusation by Rosie, who also makes sure that he keeps seeing something red to prevent his escape from prison. Dave is put on death row for murder, but his powers thwart the first three attempts to execute him.

Despite Rosie's last-ditch attempt to ensure Dave's demise, Dave finally escapes prison, jumps into the sea and swims to the Barracuda. Once he finds Dunlop aboard, alive but frozen stiff, he uses a piece of bubblegum to create a balloon, and both men rise out of the ocean and float back to the city. Having heard of Dave's escape, Torpedo and Rosie prepare to flee with Evelyn as their hostage. Dave intercepts them by jumping onto their amphibian aircraft and redirecting it to an airfield where the police are waiting. Finally convinced of the validity of Dave's powers, Dunlop confidently jumps off the balloon while Dave races to save him. At the last instant, he manages to catch Dunlop (though in the process they wind up plunging through the earth and straight up to China), and both return safe and sound to prepare for Dave's and Evelyn's wedding. However, Evelyn, still reluctant to have a super-powered husband, has decided to have the last word in the matter by having her hair dyed red.

== Cast ==
- Terence Hill as Officer Dave Speed
- Ernest Borgnine as Sgt. William Dunlop
- Joanne Dru as Rosy Labouche
- Marc Lawrence as Tony Torpedo
- Julie Gordon as Evelyn Dunlop
- Lee Sandman as Police Chief McEnroy
- Sal Borghese as "Paradise Alley"
- Woody Woodbury as NASA Major
- Dow Stout as Clyde
- Herb Goldstein as Silvius
- Sergio Smacchi as "Slot Machine"
- Claudio Ruffini as "Tragedy Row"
- Don Sebastian as Dingo

== Production ==
Director Sergio Corbucci was previously known for directing Spaghetti Western films in the 1960s. Since the mid-1970s, Corbucci was known as one of Italy's most successful filmmakers within the field of comedy. The film was designed for an American audience and shot on location in Miami.

== Release ==
Super Fuzz was released in Italy in Turin and Bologna on October 30, 1980. Outside of the United States and Italy, the film was released through Columbia Pictures and Warner Bros.

The film was shown in heavy rotation on HBO in the early 1980s.

== Reception ==
In contemporary reviews, Super Fuzz received a negative review in Variety who called the film "miscast to the hilt" and "all sheer shab both artistically and technically. Within a minute of the opening title, somebody belches and the tone is set for the remainder." The New York Times stated that Corbucci and his crew "have joined forces to provide employment for several oldtime performers. That is the film's major accomplishment" and that there was only one funny gag within the film.

From retrospective reviews, Jason Buchanan of AllMovie found that Super Fuzz "still holds up as a fun, lightweight, and immensely entertaining way to spend a Saturday night with few friends." The review concluded that Super Fuzz "can be enjoyed equally by both adults who appreciate a mindless retro comedy, or children who enjoy such simple pleasures as the [sight] of Borgnine dancing atop a giant, floating bubble-gum balloon."

== See also ==
- List of Italian films of 1980

== Footnotes ==
=== References ===
- Curti, Roberto (2016). Diabolika: Supercriminals, Superheroes and the Comic Book Universe in Italian Cinema. Midnight Marquee Press. ISBN 978-1-936168-60-6.
- Willis, Donald, ed. (1985). Variety's Complete Science Fiction Reviews. Garland Publishing Inc. ISBN 978-0-8240-6263-7.
