= The Battling Kangaroo =

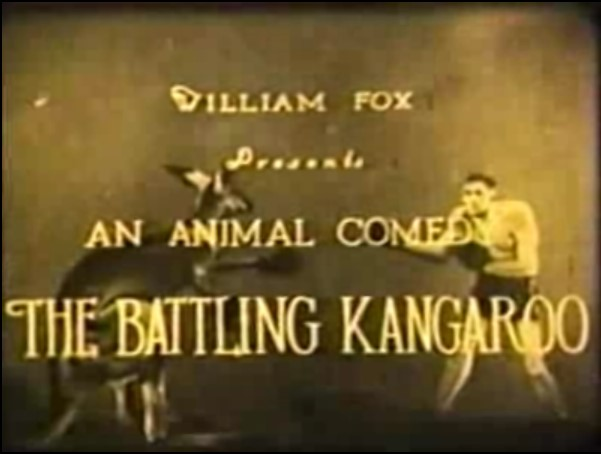
- opening title card
- Directed by: Jules White
- Story by: Hewlett Benjamin; Edward Marshall
- Produced by: George Marshall
- Starring: Lige Conley; Sterling Holloway; George Gray; Mildred June; Al Kaufman
- Production company: Fox Film
- Distributed by: Fox Film
- Release date: December 5, 1926 (US)
- Running time: 18 mins.
- Country: United States
- Language: Silent (English intertitles)

The Battling Kangaroo is an American two reel, slap stick silent comedy film directed by Jules White in 1926. Fox Film Corporation produced and distributed the film. Fox Film released it in the United States on December 5, 1926.

Sterling Holloway made his motion picture debut in this short film.

== Plot ==
Limber Lucy, a trapeze artist, wants to leave the carnival of which her family is part, but they cannot leave until her father repays $1,000 to the carnival owner, Knockout Kelly. The latter is a former farmhand "who loved to plant cauliflowers on people's ears." Lucy flees Kelly after he accosts her.

Pete Brush, a taxi driver who fancies Lucy, learns of Kelly's pursuit of Lucy and that "a thousand dollars stand between [Lucy] and happiness." Brush sees an advertisement that "Knockout Kelly Fights Anything on Two Feet. $1000.00 CASH If You Knock Him Out." After failing to knock out Kelly himself, Brush and two carnival workers attempt to hijack a passenger from a competitor's taxi, as the rider has offered "A thousand dollars if you reach the dock before my boat departs."

The short

After commandeering the passenger, they deliver him to the boat but fail to procure the fare. Fleeing the irate taxi driver, the three men accidentally free three kangaroos from a crate, who cause havoc. The three men are then able to guide one of the kangaroos, attired for boxing, into the ring with Knockout Kelly. The kangaroo, after battling with Kelly, then knocks him out. Brush receives the thousand dollars for the knock out. He and Lucy kiss.

== Cast ==
The cast credits are from the film's intertitles.

- Lige Conley as Pete Brush, the taxi driver who fancies Lucy
- Sterling Holloway as Napoleon French, a carnival worker
- George Gray, credited as George Grey, as another carnival worker
- Mildred June as Limber Lucy
- Al Kaufman as Knockout Kelly

== Gallery ==
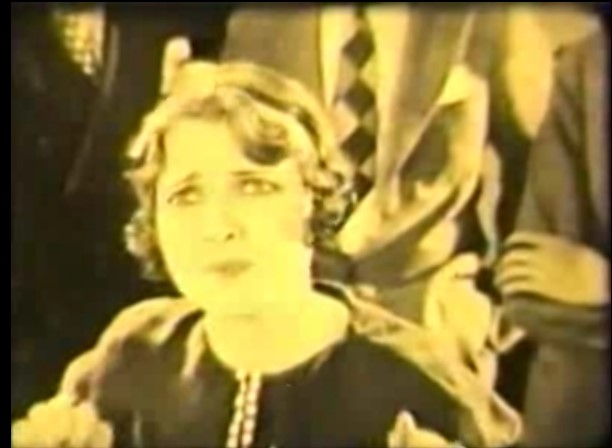
Mildred June

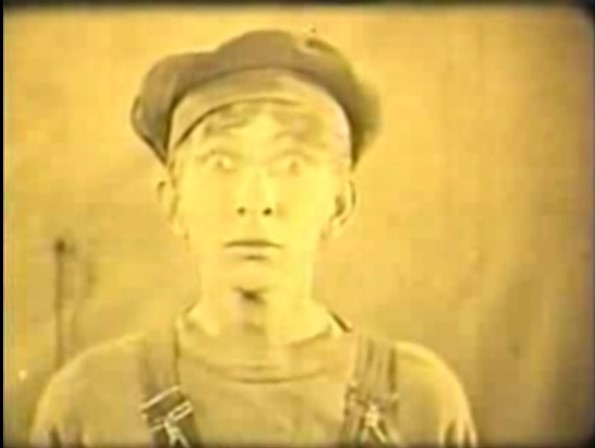
Sterling Holloway

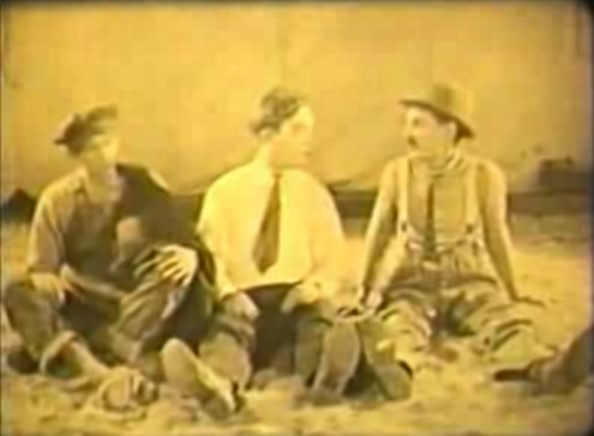
Holloway, Conley, and Grey

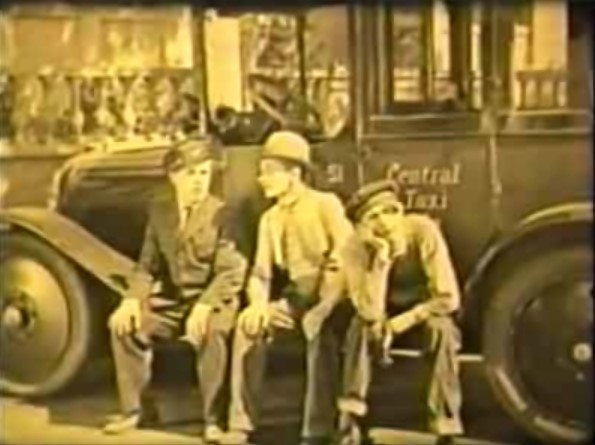
Conley, Grey, and Holloway

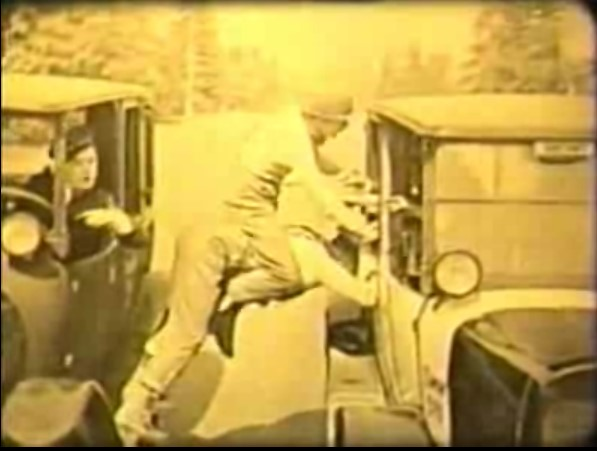
The abduction of a passenger from another taxi

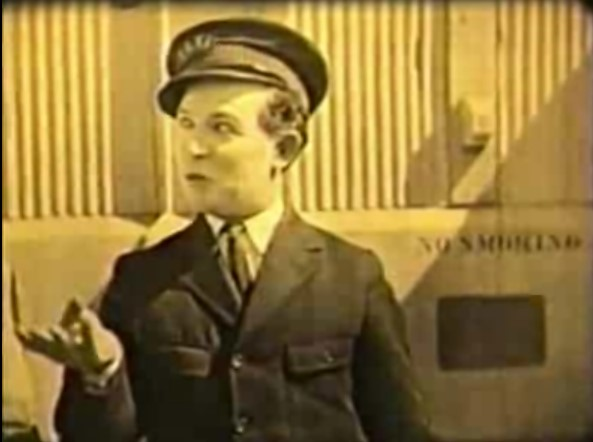
Conley

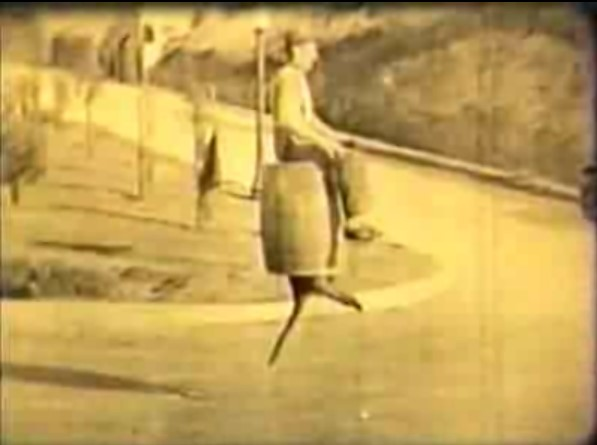
Grey travelling by kangaroo

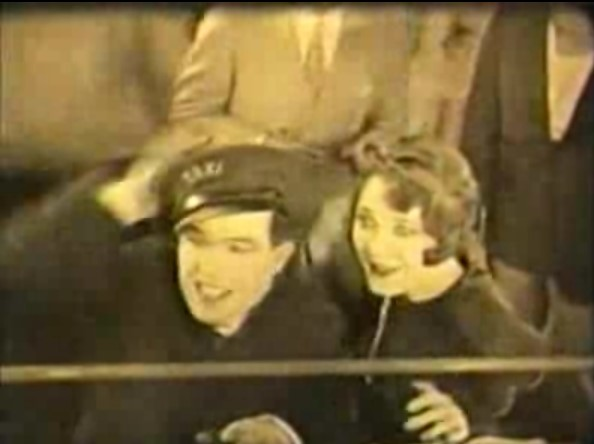
Conley and June in the kangaroo boxing scene

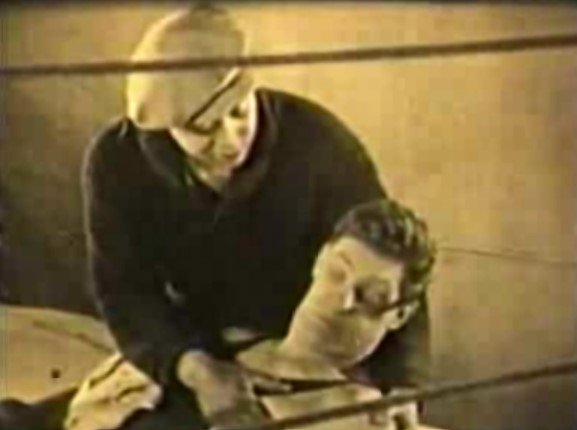
An extra and Kaufman as a knocked-out boxer
