= Lambert the Sheepish Lion =

1952 film by Jack Hannah

- Directed by: Jack Hannah
- Story by: Bill Peet; Ralph Wright; Milt Banta
- Produced by: Walt Disney
- Starring: Clarence Nash; Jimmy MacDonald; The Jon Conlon Singers
- Narrated by: Sterling Holloway
- Music by: Joseph Dubin
- Animation by: Eric Larson; John Lounsbery; Don Lusk; Judge Whitaker
- Layouts by: Yale Gracey
- Backgrounds by: Ray Huffine
- Color process: Technicolor
- Production company: Walt Disney Productions
- Distributed by: RKO Radio Pictures
- Release date: February 8, 1952
- Running time: 8:15
- Country: United States
- Language: English

Lambert the Sheepish Lion is a Disney animated short film that was released in 1952. It was directed by Jack Hannah.

== Plot ==
A stork delivers a flock of newborn lambs to their expectant mothers, but finds that he had mistakenly brought along a lion named Lambert, which was supposed to go to South Africa; one of the mother sheep, who was heartbroken at not receiving a lamb, forcefully demands the stork leave Lambert with her.

Lambert lives his life thinking he is a sheep, but is ostracized by his peers for being and acting different; he is also defenseless against the other lambs' head-butts. One night, a hungry wolf attacks the flock. At first timid like the other sheep, Lambert's lion instincts kick in when the wolf corners Lambert's mother; with an aggressive roar, Lambert butts the wolf off a ledge.

Thereafter, the now-adult Lambert is wholeheartedly accepted by the other sheep as one of the flock and the narrator tells us to not worry about that wolf, which hangs precariously from a bush—the berries on the bush will sustain him.

== Cast ==
The voice of the narrator and the stork was provided by actor and Disney legend Sterling Holloway. Holloway was also the voice for the stork in Dumbo, in which the character plays a very similar role in the plot.

== Reception ==
In 1952, the film was nominated for an Academy Award in the category Best Short Subject, Cartoons but lost to The Two Mouseketeers, a Tom and Jerry cartoon which shared one of 7 Oscars for the Tom and Jerry series. A picture book adaptation for children was also released in the 1970s as part of the "Disney's Wonderful World of Reading" series.

It has been claimed the original print of the film was given as a gift to Emperor Hirohito of Japan because it was his favorite Disney cartoon, but there is no source to this claim.

== Other releases ==
The short aired as a prelude to Disney's The Lion King when originally released on the big screen in some countries. In the late 1980s it was seen on NBC television as a prelude to the network's prime-time airing of Dumbo, likely because of the presence of the stork character in both films.

== Home media ==
The short was released on December 6, 2005, on Walt Disney Treasures: Disney Rarities - Celebrated Shorts: 1920s–1960s.

Additional releases include:

- Limited Gold Edition: Disney's Best - The Fabulous 50's, 1984
- Walt Disney Mini Classics video release of Willie the Operatic Whale, 1991
- 25th anniversary DVD release of The Fox and the Hound, 2006
- Gold Classic Collection DVD release of Melody Time, 2000
- Walt Disney Animation Collection DVD release of Volume 2: Three Little Pigs, 2009
