= Sioux City Sue (film) =

1946 film by Frank McDonald

- Theatrical release poster
- Directed by: Frank McDonald
- Screenplay by: Olive Cooper
- Produced by: Armand Schaefer
- Starring: Gene Autry; Lynne Roberts; Sterling Holloway; Richard Lane; Ralph Sanford; Ken Lundy
- Cinematography: Reggie Lanning
- Edited by: Fred Allen
- Music by: R. Dale Butts
- Production company: Republic Pictures
- Distributed by: Republic Pictures
- Release date: November 21, 1946
- Running time: 69 minutes
- Country: United States
- Language: English

Sioux City Sue is a 1946 American Western film directed by Frank McDonald and written by Olive Cooper. Starring Gene Autry, Lynne Roberts, Sterling Holloway, Richard Lane, Ralph Sanford and Ken Lundy, it was released on November 21, 1946, by Republic Pictures.

Using a story line from the 1939 comedy She Married a Cop and a 1946 Hit Parade song for the title, the film marks Autry's return to the screen following his service in the United States Army Air Forces during World War II.

== Plot ==
Hollywood talent scout Sue Warner is in search of a singing cowboy. She discovers cattle rancher Gene Autry and offers him a contract. In danger of losing his herd and ranch from financial problems, Gene agrees to go to Hollywood if there is a part for his horse Champion, unaware that the producers only want to use his voice in an animated cartoon. After the preview, in which he feels ridiculed because his character is a donkey, he and Champ depart in a huff. The annoyed Sue also follows and gets work on Gene's ranch as a cook. Later, the studio heads, while looking at Gene's screen test, decide he is a natural and want to sign him to a contract. After a few misunderstandings, Gene realizes that Sue is sincere, and he signs a contract to star in a musical western, but first he has to stop a cattle stampede and rout a gang of rustlers trying to blow up his ranch dam.

== Cast ==
- Gene Autry as Gene Autry
- Lynne Roberts as Sue Warner
- Sterling Holloway as Nellie Bly
- Richard Lane as Jeff Lang
- Ralph Sanford as Big Gulliver
- Ken Lundy as Jody
- Helen Wallace as Miss Price
- Pierre Watkin as G.W. Rhodes
- The Cass County Boys as Musical Autry Ranchhands
