= Saddle Pals (film) =

1947 film by Lesley Selander

- Theatrical release poster
- Directed by: Lesley Selander
- Screenplay by: Robert Creighton Williams; Jerry Sackheim
- Story by: Dorrell McGowan; Stuart E. McGowan
- Produced by: Sidney Picker
- Starring: Gene Autry; Lynne Roberts; Sterling Holloway; Irving Bacon; Damian O'Flynn; Charles Arnt
- Cinematography: Bud Thackery
- Edited by: Harry Keller
- Production company: Republic Pictures
- Distributed by: Republic Pictures
- Release date: June 6, 1947
- Running time: 72 minutes
- Country: United States
- Language: English

Saddle Pals is a 1947 American Western film directed by Lesley Selander and written by Robert Creighton Williams and Jerry Sackheim. The film stars Gene Autry, Lynne Roberts, Sterling Holloway, Irving Bacon, Damian O'Flynn and Charles Arnt. The film was released on June 6, 1947, by Republic Pictures.

== Cast ==
- Gene Autry as Gene Autry
- Lynne Roberts as Shelly Brooks
- Sterling Holloway as Waldo T. Brooks Jr.
- Irving Bacon as Thaddeus Bellweather
- Damian O'Flynn as Bradford Collins
- Charles Arnt as William Schooler
- Jean Van as Robin Brooks
- Tom London as Dad Gardner
- Charles Williams as Leslie
- Francis McDonald as Sheriff
- George Chandler as Pickpocket Dippy
- Edward Gargan as Jailer
- The Cass County Boys as The Three Singing Ranchhands
