= Petticoat Politics =

1941 film by Erle C. Kenton

- Directed by: Erle C. Kenton
- Written by: Ewart Adamson; Taylor Caven
- Produced by: Robert North
- Starring: Roscoe Karns; Ruth Donnelly; Spencer Charters
- Cinematography: Jack A. Marta
- Edited by: Edward Mann
- Music by: Mort Glickman
- Production company: Republic Pictures
- Distributed by: Republic Pictures
- Release date: January 31, 1941
- Running time: 67 minutes
- Country: United States
- Language: English

Petticoat Politics is a 1941 American comedy film directed by Erle C. Kenton and starring Roscoe Karns, Ruth Donnelly and Spencer Charters. It was the ninth and final of Republic's Higgins Family series.

== Plot ==
Lil Higgins become excessively worried that her newly retired husband Joe will die now that he has nothing to do all day. She has learned from a sales-eager insuranceman that the mortality rate is exceptionally high for inactive older men. To try to keep Joe alive, Lil wants him to make some home improvements in the kitchen.

It turns out Joe is a catastophe in the kitchen, but instead Lil tries to make him run for mayor in town. Since Joe is a most reluctant candidate for "petticoat politics", he needs a good reason to do as his wife wants. He gets one when he is denied membership in an exclusive lodge, the Knights of Bedlam, by a man named Wilcox. Joe is determined to show Wilcox that he made a mistake not accepting his membership application.

When Joe is down at City Hall to file his application and pay the fee, he bumps into a hoodlum named Slats O'Dell, who works for infamous gangster boss Guy Markwell. Joe is lured into betting on his own campaign, with one dollar for every vote he gets against every vote he loses, even though Markwell practically controls the current mayor.

Unaware that Joe has decided to run for mayor after all, Lil and her friend Ella Jones has persuaded Wilcox to be a reform mayoral candidate. When Joe hears about this, he and his father-in-law, Grandpa Edgar, try to get Wilcox out if the race. They arrange a duck hunt where Wilcox participates and "gets into trouble". Joe "rescues" Wilcox from drowning and out of gratitude Wilcox decides to drop out of the mayoral race. Joe has no idea that the real reason for Wilcox dropping out is that he has been threatened by Markwell.

Soon Joe understands that there are forces who do not want him to win the election, and that he is the only candidate standing in the way of the sitting mayor, Williams, being reelected. Ella and Edgar try to help Joe by attempting to steal information proving that Markwell is crooked and has blackmailed the candidates, but their plan fails.

Without anything on Markwell, Joe is convinced he will be done off with if he does not drop out of the race. In the meantime, Wilcox has seen to it that Joe be accepted as a member of the lodge, trying to help him win the race.

As part of the initiation, Joe is gagged and kidnapped by masked lodgers. Joe does not realize they are from the lodge, but thinks they are Markwell's goons coming to kill him. Joe fights for his life, but is overpowered in the end. They strap him to a sign high up above the ground, and try to convince him it's only part of the initiation. Joe eventually falls down, landing in Lil's car. The spectacular events surrounding the initiation make headlines in the newspaper afterwards, and helps Joe win the election. Markwell and his goons end up in jail, and Joe visits them to collect his prize for winning the bet.

== Cast ==
- Roscoe Karns as Joe Higgins
- Ruth Donnelly as Lil Higgins
- Spencer Charters as Grandpa [Edgar]
- George Ernest as Sidney Higgins
- Lois Ranson as Betty Higgins
- Polly Moran as Ella Jones
- Paul Hurst as Slats O'Dell
- Pierre Watkin as Alfred Wilcox
- Alan Ladd as Don Wilcox
- Harry Woods as Guy Markwell
- Claire Carleton as Tilly
- Jeff Corey as Henry Trotter
