= My Wife's Relatives =

- Directed by: Gus Meins
- Screenplay by: Jack Townley
- Story by: Dorrell McGowan; Stuart E. McGowan
- Produced by: Sol C. Siegel
- Starring: James Gleason; Lucile Gleason; Russell Gleason; Harry Davenport; Lynne Roberts; Tommy Ryan
- Cinematography: Jack A. Marta
- Edited by: Ernest J. Nims
- Music by: Cy Feuer; William Lava
- Production company: Republic Pictures
- Distributed by: Republic Pictures
- Release date: May 20, 1939
- Running time: 65 minutes
- Country: United States
- Language: English

My Wife's Relatives is a 1939 American comedy film directed by Gus Meins and written by Jack Townley. The film stars James Gleason, Lucile Gleason, Russell Gleason, Harry Davenport, Lynne Roberts and Tommy Ryan. The film was released on May 20, 1939, by Republic Pictures.

The film is the second of the nine-film Higgins Family series.

== Plot ==
Joe Higgins is going to offer an expensive ring to his wife Lil to celebrate their 25th wedding anniversary, but gets fired from his job at the candy factory on the same day. Then Joe losses the ring and his son Sidney offers a reward to who finds it, meanwhile Grandpa begins to worry about the Higgins' finances and decides to marry a wealthy widow.

== Cast ==
- James Gleason as Joe Higgins
- Lucile Gleason as Lil Higgins
- Russell Gleason as Sidney Higgins
- Harry Davenport as Grandpa Ed Carson
- Lynne Roberts as Jean Higgins
- Tommy Ryan as Tommy Higgins
- Purnell Pratt as Mr. Ellis
- Maude Eburne as Widow Ella Jones
- Marjorie Gateson as Mrs. Ellis
- Henry Arthur as Bill Ellis
- Sally Payne as Lizzie
- Edward Keane as Jarvis
