= Lucile Gleason =

American actress

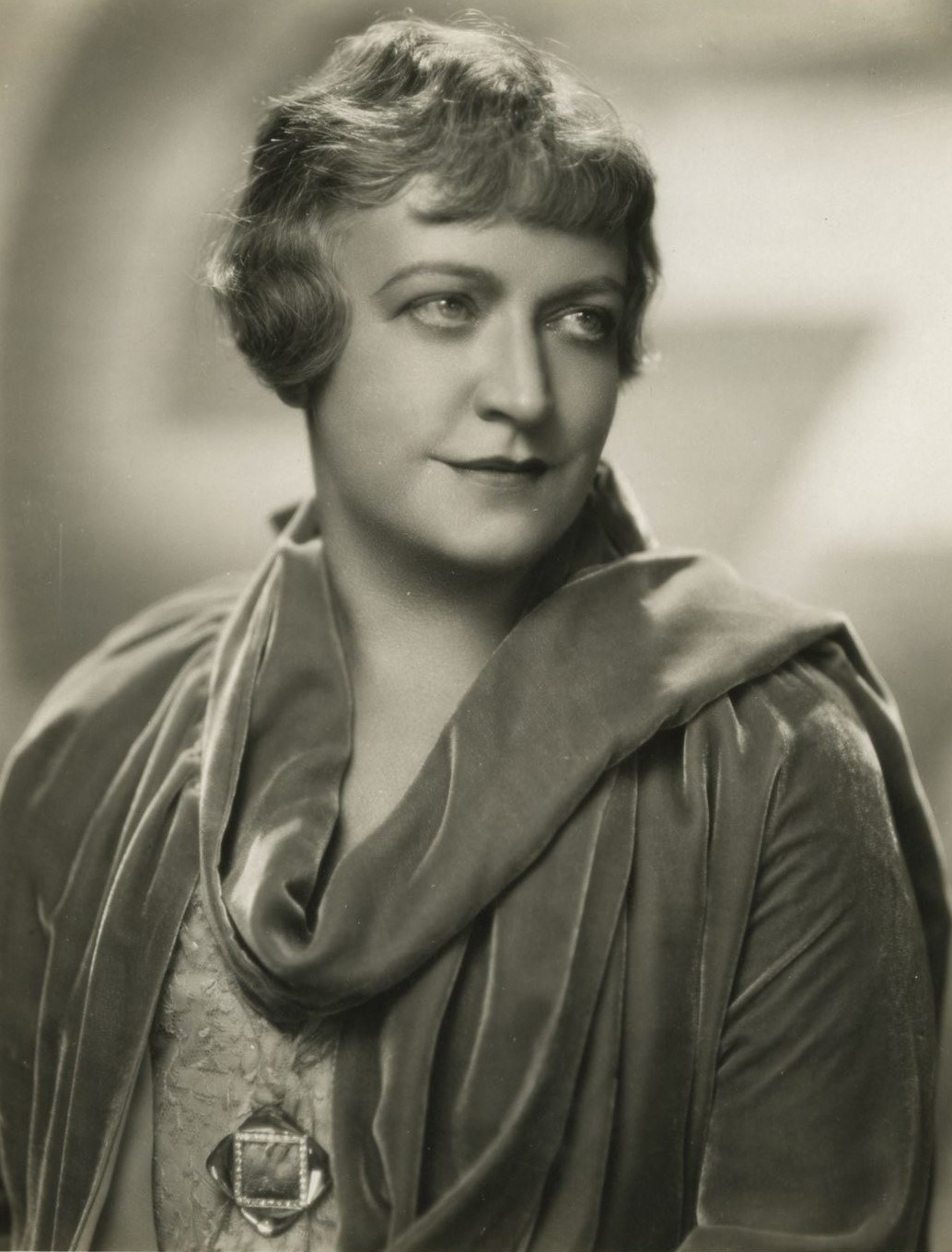
- Lucile Gleason in the 1929 film The Shannons of Broadway
- Born: Lucile Webster; February 6, 1888; Pasadena, California, U.S.
- Died: May 18, 1947 (aged 59); Brentwood, California, U.S.
- Occupation: Actress
- Spouse: James Gleason (m. 1905)
- Children: Russell Gleason

Lucile Gleason (née Webster; February 6, 1888 – May 18, 1947) was an American stage and screen actress. Gleason was also a civic worker who was active in film colony projects.

== Early life ==
Lucile Webster was born on February 6, 1888, in Pasadena, California.

== Career ==
=== Stage ===
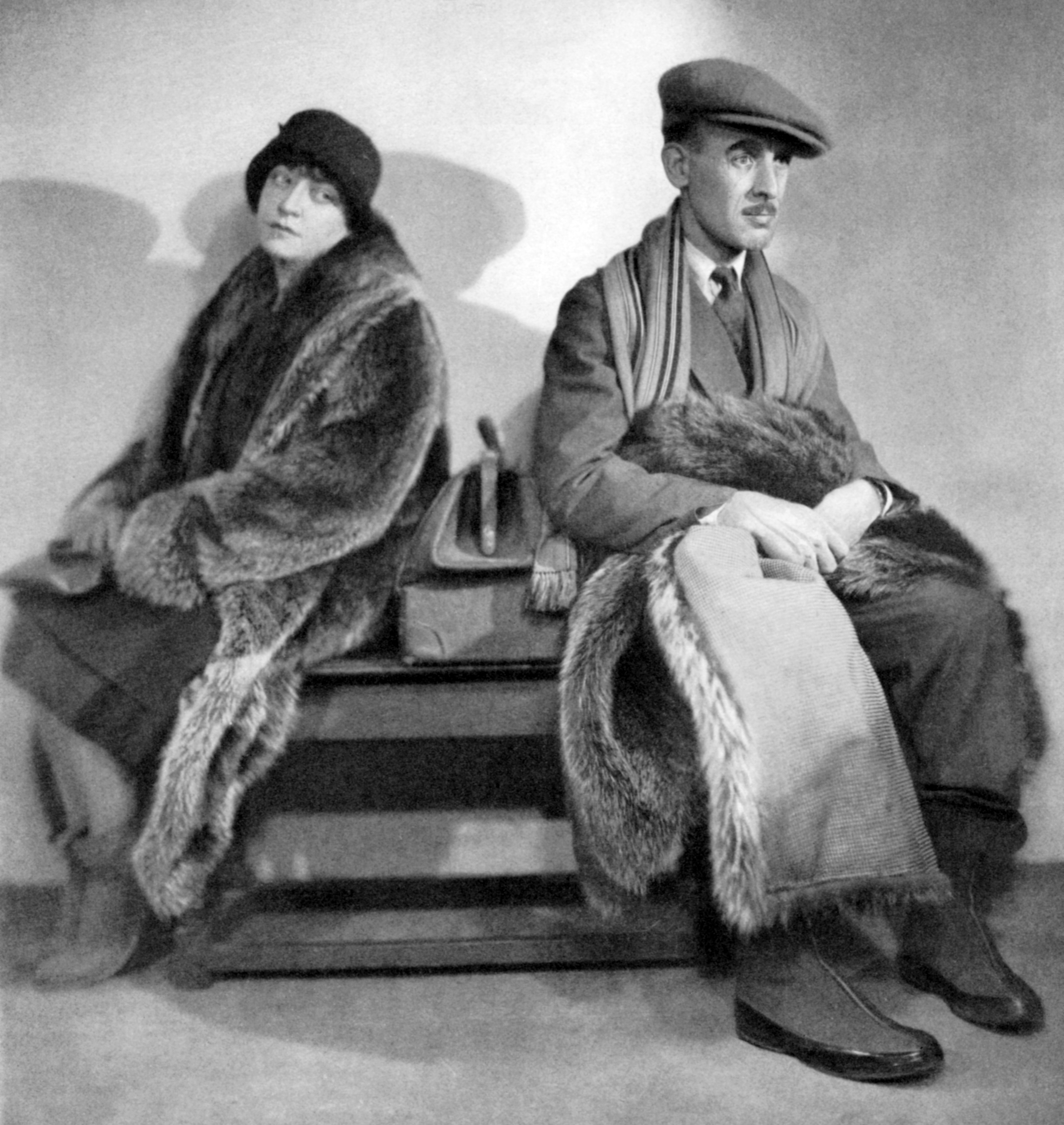
Lucile Gleason and James Gleason in the Broadway production of The Shannons of Broadway (1927)

Lucile Webster went on stage as a teen working with her father's stock company. After she married actor James Gleason, she realized stage success in New York City in a production of The Shannons of Broadway (1927), written by her husband. The play was adapted for a 1929 film of the same name, and was later made into the film Goodbye Broadway (1938).

=== Film ===
Gleason's motion picture career started with several movies in 1929 and continued until 1945. The Gleasons continued to perform together in Hollywood. In 1929 they co-starred in The Shannons of Broadway. In 1945, they made The Clock, with Lucile playing the role of Mrs. Al Henry, the wife of her husband's character.

=== Higgins Family films ===
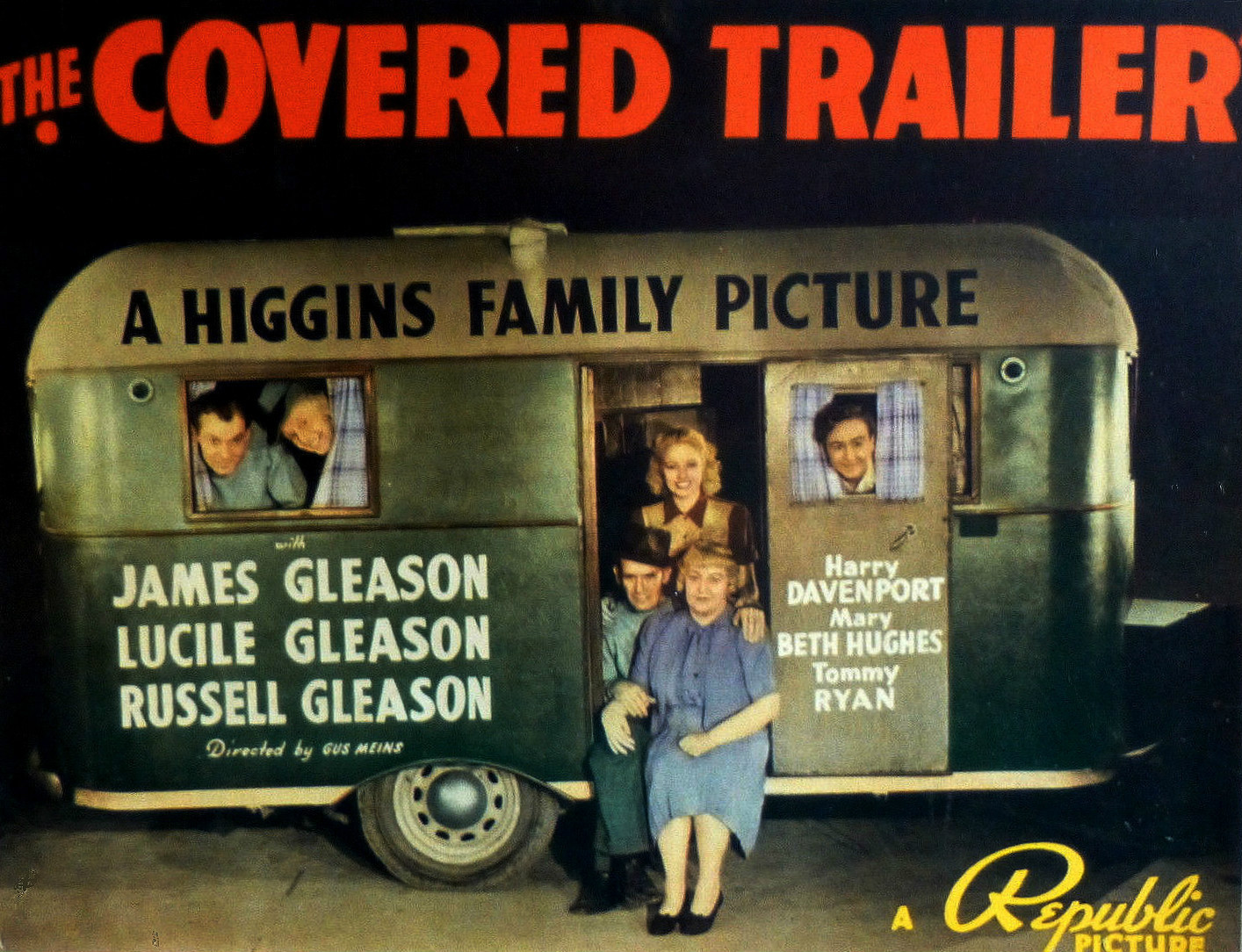
The Gleasons as the Higgins Family in the 1939 film, The Covered Trailer

Their son, Russell, was paired with his parents in the farcical family comedy, The Higgins Family, in 1938. The story centers around Lucile's performance in two radio programs which threaten to derail her husband's advertising business. The trio was also featured in Grandpa Goes to Town, another Higgins saga, in 1940.

=== Activism ===
She was a vice-president of the Screen Actors Guild and was a member of the Hollywood U.S.O. and the Veterans' Service Council. In 1947 she was named Mother of 1947 in a Mother's Day observance conducted by the U.S.O. In the 1930s Gleason served on the advisory board of the Federal Theater Project. On several occasions she was an unsuccessful candidate for political office. In 1944 Gleason ran for the Assembly from the 59th District in California. In 1946 she was defeated by then incumbent Secretary of State Frank Jordan.

== Personal life ==
Gleason became the wife of actor James Gleason in 1905, when the couple married in Oakland, California. She took his surname as her professional and legal surname.

Her only child was actor Russell Gleason (1908-1945), whose most prominent role came in the Academy Award-winning version of All Quiet on the Western Front (1930), in which he played the role of Private Müller.

On December 26, 1945, Russell Gleason was in New York City when he fell to his death out of a fourth story window in the Hotel Sutton. He had been awaiting deployment to Europe with his regiment in the hotel, which the army had commandeered to house the troops. Reports varied, some saying the fall was accidental, while others stating it was a suicide.

== Death ==
Gleason died in her sleep, apparently of heart disease in 1947, aged 59, at her home in Brentwood, California.

== Filmography ==
Year	Title	Role	Notes
1929	The Shannons of Broadway	Emma Shannon	
1931	The Pagan Lady	Nellie	
1931	Girls About Town	Mrs. Benjamin Thomas	
1931	Nice Women	Mrs. Girard	
1932	Girl of the Rio	Matron	
1933	Don't Bet on Love	Mrs. Gilbert	
1933	The Solitaire Man	Mrs. Arthur Peabody	
1933	Love, Honor, and Oh Baby!	Flo Bowen	
1934	Beloved	The Duchess	
1934	Woman Unafraid	Augusta Winthrop	
1934	I Like It That Way	Mrs. Anderson	
1934	A Successful Failure	Mrs. Cushing	
1936	Klondike Annie	Big Tess	
1936	The Ex-Mrs. Bradford	Mrs. Hutchins	
1936	Rhythm on the Range	Penelope 'Penny' Ryland	
1936	Red Lights Ahead	Molly 'Ma' Wallace	
1937	Navy Blues	Aunt Beulah	
1937	First Lady	Mrs. Ives	
1938	The Higgins Family	Lillian Higgins	
1938	The Nurse from Brooklyn	'Ma' Hutchins	
1938	The Beloved Brat	Miss Brewster	
1939	My Wife's Relatives	Lil Higgins	
1939	Should Husbands Work?	Lil Higgins	
1939	The Covered Trailer	Lil Higgins	
1939	Money to Burn	Lil Higgins	
1940	Grandpa Goes to Town	Lil Higgins	
1940	Lucky Partners	Ethel's Mother	
1940	Earl of Puddlestone	Lil Higgins	
1941	The Gay Falcon	Vera Gardner	
1942	She's in the Army	Sgt. Hannah Walters	
1943	Stage Door Canteen	Herself	
1944	Take It Big	Sophie	
1945	The Clock	Mrs. Al Henry	
1945	Don't Fence Me In	Mrs. Prentiss	(final film role)
