= Should Husbands Work? =

1939 film

- Theatrical release poster
- Directed by: Gus Meins
- Screenplay by: Taylor Caven; Jack Townley
- Produced by: Sol C. Siegel
- Starring: James Gleason; Lucile Gleason; Russell Gleason; Harry Davenport; Berton Churchill; Marie Wilson
- Cinematography: Jack A. Marta
- Edited by: William Morgan
- Music by: Cy Feuer; William Lava
- Production company: Republic Pictures
- Distributed by: Republic Pictures
- Release date: July 26, 1939
- Running time: 71 minutes
- Country: United States
- Language: English

Should Husbands Work? is a 1939 American comedy film directed by Gus Meins and written by Taylor Caven and Jack Townley. The film stars James Gleason, Lucile Gleason, Russell Gleason, Harry Davenport, Berton Churchill and Marie Wilson. The film was released on July 26, 1939, by Republic Pictures.

== Plot ==
Joe Higgins' wife Lil gets hired into a job that was meant for Joe, so now he has to stay home and do housework while she goes to work.

== Cast ==
- James Gleason as Joe Higgins
- Lucile Gleason as Lil Higgins
- Russell Gleason as Sidney Higgins
- Harry Davenport as Grandpa Higgins
- Berton Churchill as Barnes
- Marie Wilson as Myrtle
- Lynne Roberts as Jean Higgins
- Tommy Ryan as Tommy Higgins
- Henry Kolker as Taylor
- Arthur Hoyt as Roberts
- Barry Norton as Ronald McDonald
- Mary Forbes as Mrs. Barnes
- William Brisbane as Williams
- Harry C. Bradley as Snodgrass
