= The Higgins Family =

1938 film by Gus Meins

- Directed by: Gus Meins
- Screenplay by: Paul Gerard Smith; Jack Townley
- Story by: Richard English
- Produced by: Sol C. Siegel
- Starring: James Gleason; Lucile Gleason; Russell Gleason; Lynne Roberts; Harry Davenport; William Bakewell
- Cinematography: Jack A. Marta
- Edited by: Ernest J. Nims
- Music by: Cy Feuer
- Production company: Republic Pictures
- Distributed by: Republic Pictures
- Release date: August 29, 1938
- Running time: 54 minutes
- Country: United States
- Language: English

The Higgins Family is a 1938 American comedy film directed by Gus Meins and written by Paul Gerard Smith and Jack Townley. The film stars James Gleason, Lucile Gleason, Russell Gleason, Lynne Roberts, Harry Davenport and William Bakewell. The film was released on August 29, 1938, by Republic Pictures.

== Cast ==
- James Gleason as Joe Higgins
- Lucile Gleason as Lillian Higgins
- Russell Gleason as Sidney Higgins
- Lynne Roberts as Marian Higgins
- Harry Davenport as Grandpa William Jordan
- William Bakewell as Eddie Davis
- Paul Harvey as Ollie Thornwald
- Wallis Clark as George W. Bradshaw
- Sally Payne as Lizzie
- Richard Tucker as Burgess
- Doreen McKay as Miss Keene
- Franklin Parker as Reynard
- Gay Seabrook as Lydia Amesworth
