= Grandpa Goes to Town =

1940 film

- Directed by: Gus Meins
- Screenplay by: Jack Townley
- Produced by: Gus Meins
- Starring: James Gleason; Lucile Gleason; Russell Gleason; Harry Davenport; Lois Ranson; Maxie Rosenbloom
- Cinematography: Reggie Lanning
- Edited by: Murray Seldeen
- Music by: William Lava; Paul Sawtell
- Production company: Republic Pictures
- Distributed by: Republic Pictures
- Release date: April 14, 1940
- Running time: 66 minutes
- Country: United States
- Language: English

Grandpa Goes to Town is a 1940 American comedy film directed by Gus Meins and written by Jack Townley. The film stars James Gleason, Lucile Gleason, Russell Gleason, Harry Davenport, Lois Ranson and Maxie Rosenbloom. The film was released on April 14, 1940, by Republic Pictures.

== Plot ==
After selling their house, the Higgins family is convinced by a crafty real estate agent to invest the proceeds in a hotel at Coyote Wells, Nevada, sight unseen. Upon arriving at their new establishment, the Higginses find that what has been described as a thriving western community is actually a ghost town, inhabited by a gang of mobsters fleeing from the law. Things look bleak until two film actors, dressed as prospectors, appear in town and the Higginses mistake them for real gold miners and spread word of a gold strike. This announcement results in a rush of miners which transforms Coyote Wells into a boom town and the Higgins' hotel into a profitable enterprise. Their prosperity is short lived however, when the miners fail to discover gold and decide to lynch the family. Grandpa saves their hides by salting the abandoned mine with gold dust, but as he leaves the mine, he accidentally sets off a stick of dynamite. Hurrying back to Apache Wells, Grandpa rounds up the prospectors and takes them back to the mine where, much to everyone's amazement, Grandpa discovers that the explosion has uncovered a rich vein of gold. As the miners prepare to rush to the land office to file their claims, Mugsy, the head of the gangsters, pulls a gun and announces that he is holding everyone hostage until his men can file a claim on the mine. All seems lost until Grandpa mounts an old nag and gallops into town, where he convinces the movie extras, costumed as Indians, to stage a raid on the gangsters and free the miners.

== Cast ==
- James Gleason as Joe Higgins
- Lucile Gleason as Lil Higgins
- Russell Gleason as Sidney Higgins
- Harry Davenport as Grandpa
- Lois Ranson as Betty Higgins
- Maxie Rosenbloom as Al
- Tommy Ryan as Tommy Higgins
- Arturo Godoy as himself
- Noah Beery, Sr. as Sam
- Douglas Meins as Bill
- Garry Owen as Muggsy
- Ray Turner as Homer
- Lee 'Lasses' White as Ike
- Walter Miller as Director
- Emmett Lynn as Jaspar
- Joe Caits as Woodrow
- Ledda Godoy as herself
