= Meet the Missus (1940 film) =

1940 film

- Directed by: Malcolm St. Clair
- Produced by: Robert North(associate)
- Starring: Roscoe Karns
- Production company: Republic Pictures
- Distributed by: Republic Pictures
- Release date: November 29, 1940
- Running time: 68 minutes
- Country: United States
- Language: English

Meet the Missus is a 1940 American comedy film, directed by Malcolm St. Clair and produced by Robert North. It is the eighth film in the Higgins Family series,

== Plot ==
Valentine's Day is approaching fast, when Joe Higgins gets a call from his boss, Mr. Simpson, interrupting the grand preparations for the celebration. It turns out that $5,000 in bonds, that was supposed to be paid as a security for the company through Sidney Higgins, Joe's son, haven't been delivered. When Joe confronts Sid about the money, it turns out they are lost. A desperate search for the money begins, and the last time the papers were seen was in the hands of little Millie Lou, the neighbor's daughter, as she picked them up, but she is now gone too.

John Williams, who is Joe's daughter Betty Higgins' boyfriend, and a lawyer, tells Sid that the loss of the bonds papers could ultimately send him to jail. To save their son from incarceration, Joe and his wife Lil try to borrow money as collateral, first by taking a loan at the bank, which doesn't work, and then by getting grandpa Ed to marry a rich woman. The woman, Ella Jones, has been after Ed a long time, but he isn't interested the least to marry her.

Ed agrees to try, and writes a love letter to Ella, confessing his love for her. The letter is then delivered by Millie Lou before Joe can give Ed the good news that the bank loan has been approved, and he doesn't have to marry Ella. When Ed tries to explain to Ella that he changed his mind, she is very upset and threatens to sue him.

John tells Ed to either pay the money or get the letter, the proof, back. Ed chooses the latter alternative, and that night, he and Joe break into Ella's apartment to steal it back. The attempt results in disaster, and Joe is arrested when he enters the wrong apartment by mistake. A neighbor, Violet Stevens is also arrested, since she was fighting Elmer, her boyfriend, when Joe entered her apartment. Joe and Violet have to spend the night together in jail, making his wife Lil jealous.

When everything is explained and sorted out, and Joe and Violet are out of jail again, Elmer agrees to help Joe out with a loan.

Despite the confusion, Violet and Joe convince Elmer and Lil of their innocence, and Elmer even offers to help Joe secure the loan. But soon after this Violet is stuck with her dress in a car door, and Joe is the only person around to help her get a new dress. They are spotted by Elmer, Lil, Ed and Ella as they run into the building. Ella drops her lawsuit because the family seems too deranged for her taste.

The story ends with Joe and Ed sitting outside an igloo by the Arctic pole. They hear over the radio that Sid has finally found the bonds, and that they are forgiven by their family and expected to return home.

== Cast ==
- Roscoe Karns as Joe Higgins
- Ruth Donnelly as Lil Higgins
- Spencer Charters as Grandpa [Ed Carson]
- George Ernest as Sidney Higgins
- Lois Ranson as Betty Higgins
- Polly Moran as Ella Jones
- Astrid Allwyn as Violet Stevens
- Alan Ladd as John Williams
- Harry Woods as Elmer Shillingford
- Dorothy Ann Seese as Millie Lou
- Harry Tyler as Mr. Godfrey
- Lillian Yarbo as Maid (uncredited)

== Retrospective appraisal ==
Film historian Ruth Anne Dwyer describes Meet the Missus as a “happy surprise.”

It was a “sleeper.” not having any extraordinary publicity, yet it was a terrific popular success and inspired a whole series of Higgins Family films following director St. Clair’s unexpected hit.
