= Lynne Roberts (actress) =

American actress (1922–1978)

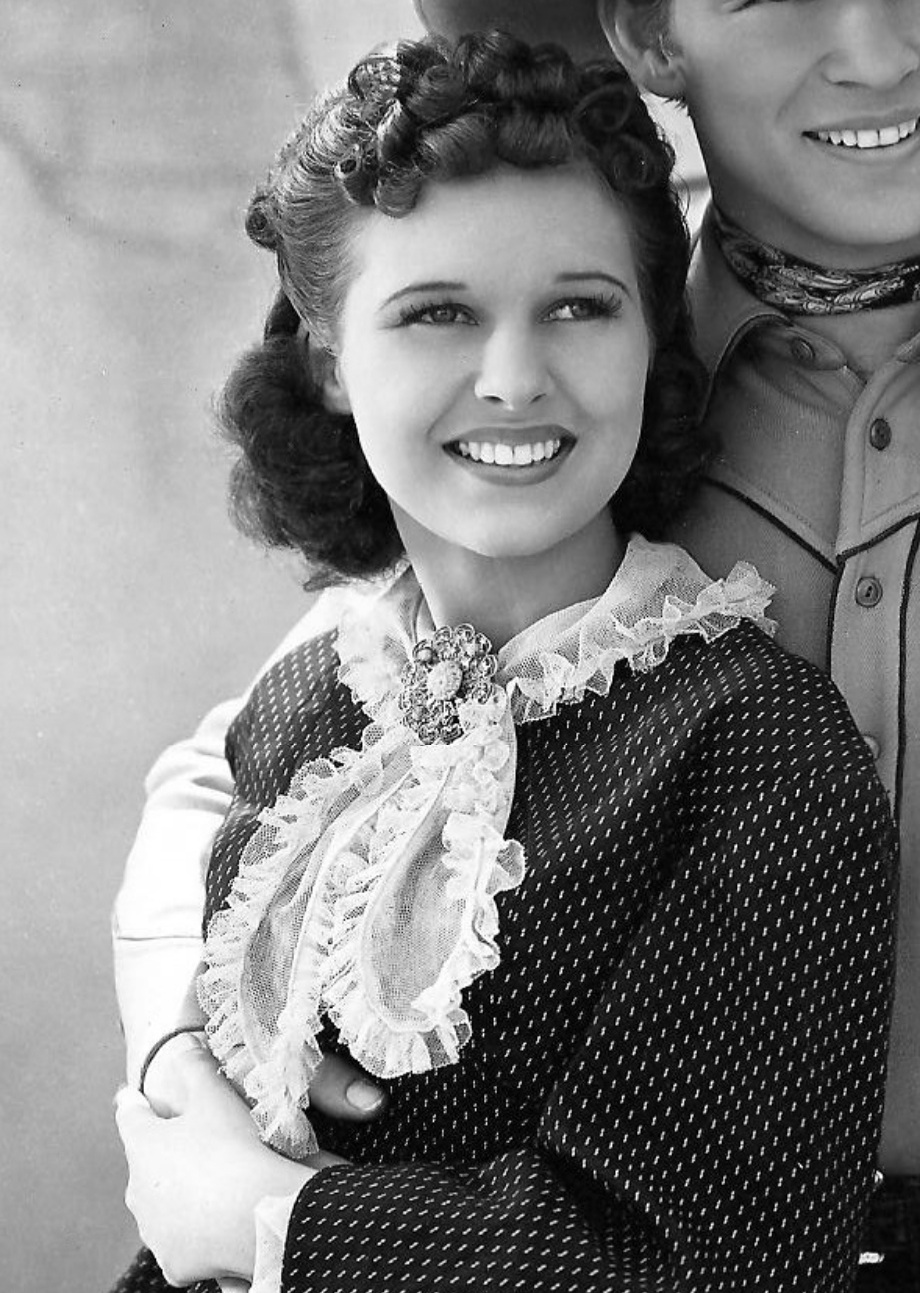
- Roberts in Billy the Kid Returns (1938)
- Born: Theda Mae Roberts; November 22, 1922; El Paso, Texas, U.S.
- Died: April 1, 1978 (aged 55); Sherman Oaks, California, U.S.
- Resting place: Forest Lawn Memorial Park, Glendale, California
- Other names: Mary Hart; Lynn Roberts
- Occupation: Actress
- Years active: 1936–1958
- Spouses: William Engelbert, Jr. (m. 1941; div. 1944) Louis John Gardella (m. 1944; div. 1952) Hyman B. Samuels (m. 1953; div. 1961) Don Sebastian (m. 1971, separated)

Lynne Roberts, also credited as Mary Hart, born Theda May Roberts (November 22, 1922 – April 1, 1978) was an American film actress during the Golden Age of Hollywood. She appeared exclusively in what were referred to as B movies.

== Early years ==
Born in El Paso, Texas, Roberts was the daughter of Hobart M. Roberts, a bookkeeper, and May Holland. The family moved to Los Angeles in the 1920s.

== Career ==
Roberts began working as an actress in the 1930s, under contract to Republic Pictures. At the age of 14, in 1936, she played a role in Bulldog Edition. In 1938, at age 16, she starred in the cliffhangers: The Lone Ranger and Dick Tracy Returns, and played a role in The Higgins Family. She was officially listed in studio records as having been born in 1919.

In 1941 she starred with Sonja Henie and John Payne in Sun Valley Serenade, while under contract to 20th Century-Fox. She returned to Republic Pictures in 1944, and stayed under contract there until 1948. She starred with Gene Autry in Sioux City Sue in 1946, and appeared in two more films with Autry: Robin Hood of Texas and Saddle Pals, as well as three films with Roy Rogers, and one with Monte Hale. (Johnny D. Boggs, in his book, Billy the Kid on Film, 1911-2012, wrote, "Lynne Roberts would co-star with [Roy] Rogers in eight Westerns, billed as Mary Hart in the first seven of those.")

After leaving Republic Pictures for the second time, Roberts worked with Autry in outdoor adventures for Columbia Pictures. She also worked with Kirby Grant in Monogram Pictures' mounted-police adventures, and with Tim Holt at RKO Radio Pictures.

Roberts appeared in 64 films in total. Of those, 21 were westerns, and two were serials.

== Personal life and death ==
Lynne Roberts (left), Sally Naiditch, Anne T. Hill (3rd from left), Dr. Leon W. Naiditch, Hyman B. Samuels (front right), Dr. Harry Lehrer (extreme right behind Samuels)

Roberts married four times. Her first marriage was to William Engelbert, Jr., an aircraft company official, with whom she had one son, Bill. The marriage ended in divorce in 1944.

Her second marriage was to Louis John Gardella, which also ended in divorce. In court, Gardella's attorney argued that the couple's Arizona wedding was invalid because Roberts was not legally divorced from Engelbert, although Roberts claimed she had a Mexican divorce decree.

In 1953, Roberts married brassiere manufacturer Hyman B. Samuels, with whom she had a daughter, Peri Margaret, and a son, William Edward. The couple divorced November 14, 1961, in Los Angeles, California.

Roberts retired from acting and later married pro wrestler and motion picture actor Don Sebastian in 1971, but she was separated from him at the time of her death. She died in Sherman Oaks in 1978 due to a brain hemorrhage from a slip-and-fall accident in her home.

== Partial filmography ==
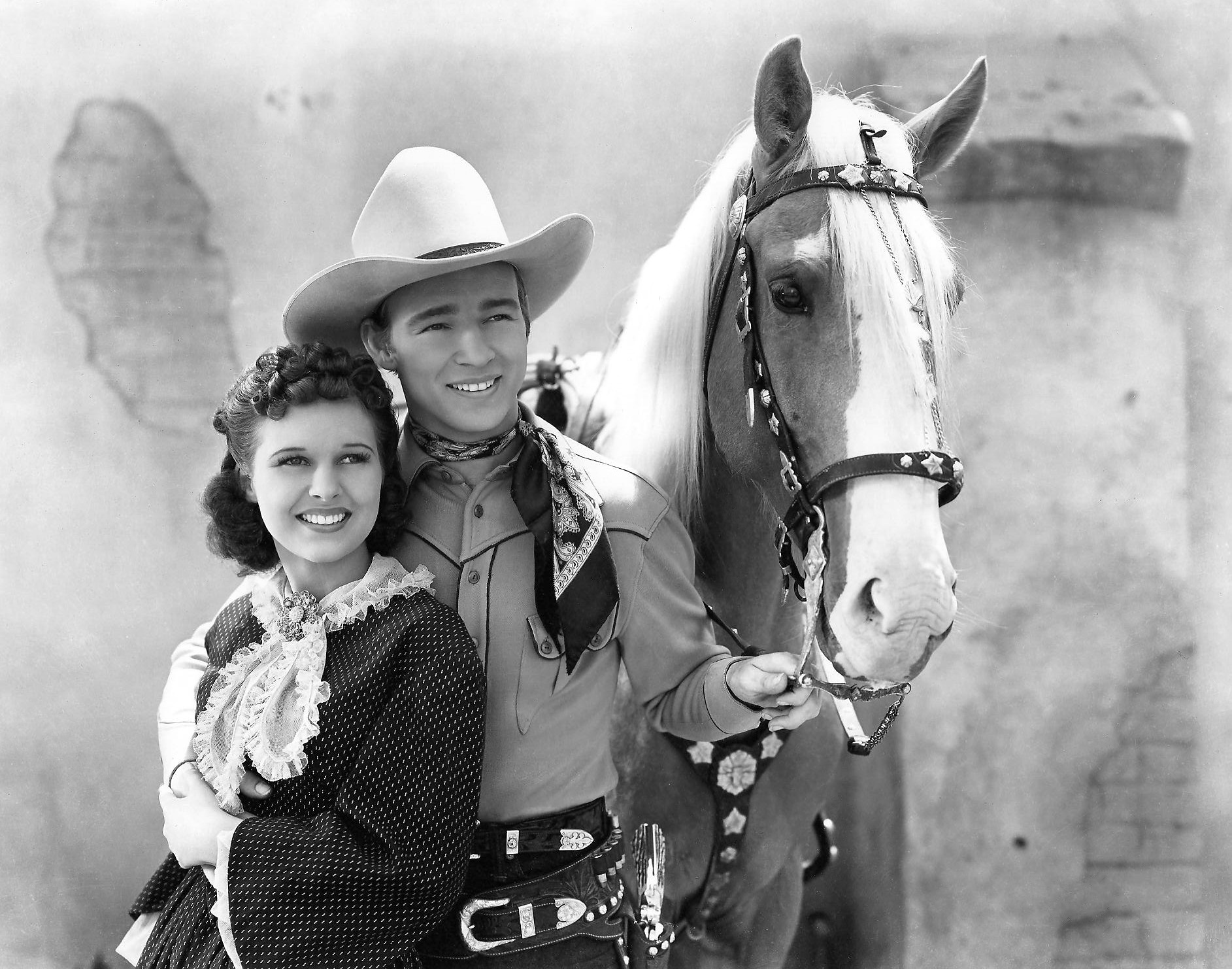
Lynne Roberts, Roy Rogers and Trigger in Billy the Kid Returns (1938)

- Mama Runs Wild (1937) as Edith Summers
- Dangerous Holiday (1937) as Jean Robbins
- The Higgins Family (1938) as Marian Higgins
- Call the Mesquiteers (1938) as Madge Irving
- Hollywood Stadium Mystery (1938) as Edna Mayberry
- The Lone Ranger (1938) as Joan Blanchard
- Billy the Kid Returns (1938) (billed as Mary Hart) as Ellen Moore
- Come On, Rangers (1938) (as Mary Hart) as Janice Forbes
- Shine On, Harvest Moon (1938) (as Mary Hart) as Claire Brower
- The Mysterious Miss X (1939) (as Mary Hart) as Julie Graham
- Rough Riders' Round-up (1939) as Dorothy Blair
- Southward Ho (1939) as Ellen Denbigh
- Frontier Pony Express (1939) as Ann Langhorne
- My Wife's Relatives (1939) as Jean Higgins
- In Old Caliente (1939) as Jean Higgins
- Should Husbands Work? (1939) as Jean Higgins
- Everything's on Ice (1939) as Jane Barton
- High School (1940) as Carol Roberts
- Star Dust (1940) as College girl
- Street of Memories (1940) as Catherine 'Kitty' Foster
- Hi-Yo Silver (1940) as Joan Blanchard
- The Bride Wore Crutches (1941) as Midge Lambert
- Romance of the Rio Grande (1941) as Maria Cordova
- Riders of the Purple Sage (1941) as Bess
- Moon Over Miami (1941) as Jennie May
- Last of the Duanes (1941) as Nancy Bowdrey
- Young America (1942) as Elizabeth Barnes
- The Man in the Trunk (1942) as Peggy LaRue
- Dr. Renault's Secret (1942) as Madeline Renault
- Quiet Please, Murder (1942) as Kay Ryan
- The Big Bonanza (1944) as Judy Parker
- My Buddy (1944) as Lucy Manners
- The Ghost That Walks Alone (1944) as Sue McGuire Grant
- The Port of 40 Thieves (1944) as Nancy Hubbard Chaney
- The Phantom Speaks (1945) as Joan Renwick
- The Chicago Kid (1945) as Chris Mitchell
- Behind City Lights (1945) as Jean Lowell
- Girls of the Big House (1945) as Jeanne Crail
- Winter Wonderland (1946) as Nancy Wheeler
- The Magnificent Rogue (1946) as Pat Brown Morgan
- Sioux City Sue (1946) as Sue Warner
- The Pilgrim Lady (1947) as Henrietta Rankin
- That's My Gal (1947) as Natalie Adams
- Saddle Pals (1947) as Shelly Brooks
- Robin Hood of Texas (1947) as Virginia
- Madonna of the Desert (1948) as Monica Dale
- Lightnin' in the Forest (1948) as Jerri Vail
- Secret Service Investigator (1948) as Susan Lane
- The Timber Trail (1948) as Alice Baker
- Eyes of Texas (1948) as Nurse Penny Thatcher
- Sons of Adventure (1948) as Jean
- Trouble Preferred (1948) as Madge Walker
- The Great Plane Robbery (1950) as Mary
- The Blazing Sun (1950) as Helen Ellis
- Call of the Klondike (1950) as Emily Mallory
- Hunt the Man Down (1950) as Sally Clark
- Dynamite Pass (1950) as Mrs. Mary Madden
- Because of You (1952) as Rosemary Balder
- The Blazing Forest (1952) as Grace Hanson
- Port Sinister (1953) as Joan Hunter
