= Money to Burn (1939 film) =

- Theatrical release poster
- Directed by: Gus Meins
- Screenplay by: Jack Townley
- Produced by: Gus Meins
- Starring: James Gleason; Lucile Gleason; Russell Gleason; Harry Davenport; Lois Ranson; Tommy Ryan
- Cinematography: Ernest Miller
- Edited by: William Morgan
- Music by: Cy Feuer; Paul Sawtell
- Production company: Republic Pictures
- Distributed by: Republic Pictures
- Release date: December 31, 1939
- Running time: 69 minutes
- Country: United States
- Language: English

Money to Burn is a 1939 American comedy film directed by Gus Meins and written by Jack Townley. The film stars James Gleason, Lucile Gleason, Russell Gleason, Harry Davenport, Lois Ranson and Tommy Ryan. The film was released on December 31, 1939, by Republic Pictures.

== Cast ==
- James Gleason as Joe Higgins
- Lucile Gleason as Lil Higgins
- Russell Gleason as Sidney Higgins
- Harry Davenport as Grandpa Ed Carson
- Lois Ranson as Betty Higgins
- Tommy Ryan as Tommy Higgins
- Thurston Hall as Ellis
- Winifred Harris as Mrs. Lucy Davis
- Douglas Meins as Bill Davis
- Lucien Littlefield as Irving
- Herbert Rawlinson as Dover
- Jack Rice as Thorne
- Andrew Tombes as Brown
- Gladys Blake as Miss Pitts
- Jean Fenwick as Miss Murphy
