= The Covered Trailer =

1939 film by Gus Meins

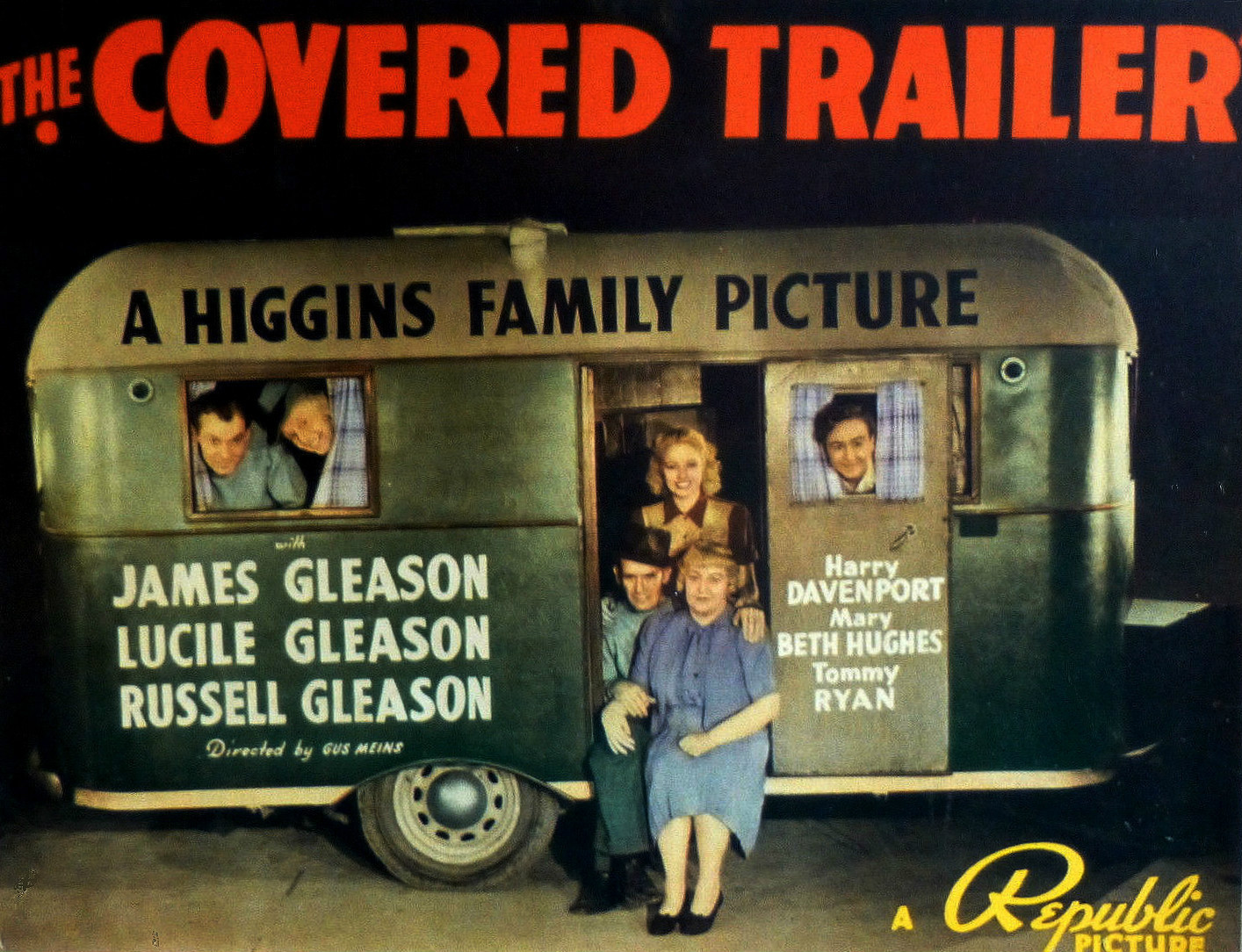
- Lobby card
- Directed by: Gus Meins
- Screenplay by: Jack Townley
- Story by: Jack Townley; M. Coates Webster
- Starring: James Gleason; Lucile Gleason; Russell Gleason; Harry Davenport; Mary Beth Hughes; Tommy Ryan
- Cinematography: Arthur Martinelli
- Edited by: Ray Snyder
- Music by: Cy Feuer; William Lava
- Production company: Republic Pictures
- Distributed by: Republic Pictures
- Release date: November 10, 1939
- Running time: 66 minutes
- Country: United States
- Language: English

The Covered Trailer is a 1939 American comedy film directed by Gus Meins and written by Jack Townley. The film stars James Gleason, Lucile Gleason, Russell Gleason, Harry Davenport, Mary Beth Hughes and Tommy Ryan. The film was released on November 10, 1939, by Republic Pictures.

In this entry in the comedy series the "Higgins Family," the group must cancel a cruise to South America after the check they needed does not arrive. To save face before their neighbors, the family embarks upon a wilderness fishing trip. The family made a wise decision to forgo the cruise as the boat sinks and everyone is lost. This creates havoc for the Higgins family neighbors who believe they went down with the ship.

== Cast ==
- James Gleason as Joe Higgins
- Lucile Gleason as Lil Higgins
- Russell Gleason as Sidney Higgins
- Harry Davenport as Grandpa Ed Carson
- Mary Beth Hughes as Betty Higgins
- Tommy Ryan as Tommy Higgins
- Maurice Murphy as Bill Williams
- Maude Eburne as Widow Ella Jones
- Spencer Charters as Sheriff
- Tom Kennedy as Otto
- Hobart Cavanaugh as E. L. Beamish
- Pierre Watkin as Horace Cartwright
- Frank Dae as Police Chief
- Richard Tucker as Doctor
- Willie Best as Baltimore
- Walter Fenner as Wells
