= Earl of Puddlestone =

- Theatrical release poster
- Directed by: Gus Meins
- Screenplay by: Ewart Adamson; Val Burton
- Story by: Cortland Fitzsimmons
- Produced by: Gus Meins
- Starring: James Gleason; Lucile Gleason; Russell Gleason; Harry Davenport; Lois Ranson; Tommy Ryan
- Cinematography: Jack A. Marta
- Edited by: Ernest J. Nims
- Music by: William Lava
- Production company: Republic Pictures
- Distributed by: Republic Pictures
- Release date: August 31, 1940
- Running time: 67 minutes
- Country: United States
- Language: English

Earl of Puddlestone is a 1940 American comedy film directed by Gus Meins and written by Ewart Adamson and Val Burton. The film stars James Gleason, Lucile Gleason, Russell Gleason, Harry Davenport, Lois Ranson and Tommy Ryan. The film was released on August 31, 1940, by Republic Pictures.

== Cast ==
- James Gleason as Joe Higgins
- Lucile Gleason as Lil Higgins
- Russell Gleason as Sidney Higgins
- Harry Davenport as Grandpa Ed Carson
- Lois Ranson as Betty Higgins
- Tommy Ryan as Tommy Higgins
- Eric Blore as Horatio Bottomley
- Betty Blythe as Millicent Potter-Potter
- Forrester Harvey as Tittington
- William Halligan as Henry Potter-Potter
- Mary Ainslee as Marian Potter-Potter
- William Brady as Bill Connolly
- Ben Carter as Homer
- James C. Morton as Officer Brannigan
- Aubrey Mather as Lord Stoke-Newington
- Mary Kenyon as Judith
