= Roscoe Karns =

American actor (1891–1970)

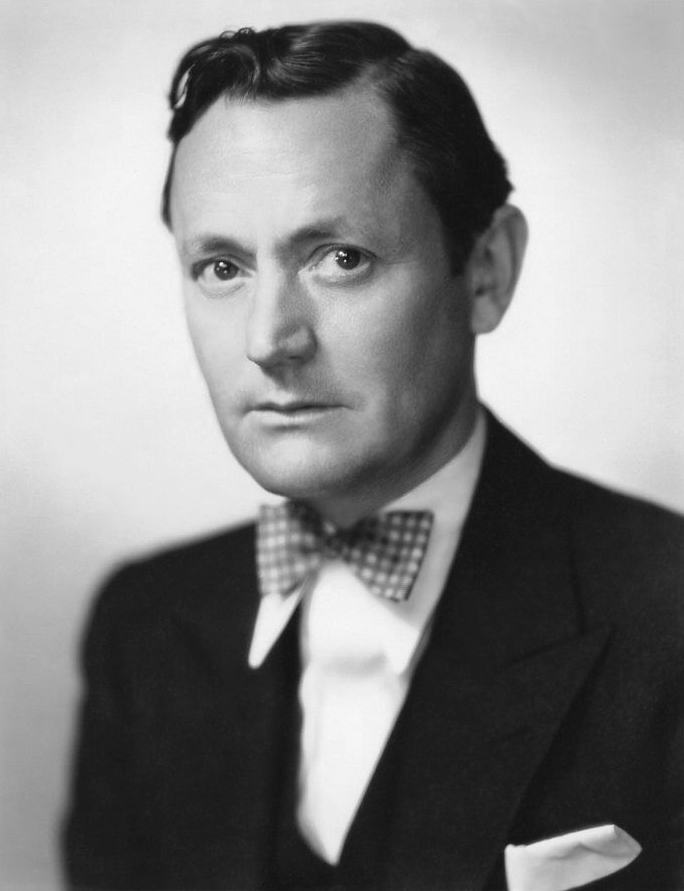
- Karns (1932)
- Born: September 7, 1891; San Bernardino, California, U.S.
- Died: February 6, 1970 (aged 78); Los Angeles, California, U.S.
- Occupation: Actor
- Years active: 1915–1964
- Spouse: Mary M. Fraso (m. 1920–1970)
- Children: 2; including Roscoe Todd

Roscoe Karns (September 7, 1891 – February 6, 1970) was an American actor who appeared in nearly 150 films between 1915 and 1964. He specialized in cynical, wise-cracking (and often tipsy) characters, and his rapid-fire delivery enlivened many comedies and crime thrillers in the 1930s and 1940s.

== Acting career ==
Karns began acting with a San Diego stock company when he was still in high school. "I’ve never earned a dime outside of show business. I can't even claim having a newspaper route as a kid," he declared.

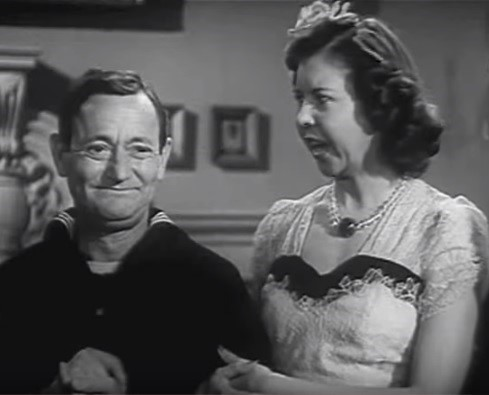
Karns and Mary Treen in The Navy Way (1944)

Though he appeared in numerous silent films, such as Wings and Beggars of Life, his career didn't really take off until sound arrived. Arguably his best-known film role was the annoying bus passenger Oscar Shapeley, who tries to pick up Claudette Colbert in the Oscar-winning comedy It Happened One Night, (1934) quickly followed by one of his best performances as the boozy press agent Owen O'Malley in Howard Hawks' Twentieth Century. (Six years later, he co-starred as one of the reporters in another Hawks classic, His Girl Friday.) In 1937, Paramount teamed him with Lynne Overman as a pair of laconic private eyes in two B comedy-mysteries, Murder Goes to College and Partners in Crime.

By the late 1940s Karns was finding it difficult to obtain movie roles, and was considering retiring, but he contacted a friend who worked for the DuMont Television Network, and he was asked to consider coming to New York City to act on television. From 1950 to 1954, Karns played the title role in the popular DuMont Television Network series Rocky King, Inside Detective. His son, character actor Todd Karns, also appeared in that series.

From 1959 to 1962, Karns was cast as Captain (then Admiral) Walter Shafer in seventy-three of the ninety-five episodes of the CBS military sitcom/drama series, Hennesey, starring Jackie Cooper in the title role of a United States Navy physician, and Abby Dalton as nurse Martha Hale.

His final film was another Hawks comedy, Man's Favorite Sport?, in 1964.

== Personal life ==
Roscoe Karns was born September 7, 1891, in San Bernardino, California. He married Mary M. Frasco in 1920, and was the father of two children – Mary Karns Hart, and Roscoe Todd Karns, Jr. He was admitted to St. Vincent's Hospital, in Los Angeles, on December 18, 1969 and died at the hospital on February 6, 1970.

== Filmography ==
- Mr. Carlson of Arizona (1915, Short)
- From Champion to Tramp (1915, Short) – The Girl's Father
- A Western Governor's Humanity (1915, Short)
- Beans for Two (1918, Short) – Jimmy's Friend
- Know Thy Wife (1918, Short) – Steve – Bob's Chum
- Brides for Two (1919, short)
- Sally's Blighted Career (1919, Short)
- Oh, Susie, Be Careful (1919, Short)
- Poor Relations (1919) – Henry
- The Family Honor (1920) – Dal Tucker
- Life of the Party (1920) – Sam Perkins
- The Man Tamer (1921) – Bradley P. Caldwell Jr
- Too Much Married (1921) – Bob Holiday
- Her Own Money (1922) – Jerry Woodward
- The Trouper (1922) – Neal Selden
- Afraid to Fight (1922) – Bertie
- Conquering the Woman (1922) – Shorty Thompson
- Other Men's Daughters (1923) – Hubert
- Down to the Ship to See (1923, Short) – Jack
- The Ten Commandments (1923) – The Boy in the Rain (uncredited)
- Bluff (1924) – Jack Hallowell
- The Midnight Express (1924) – Switch Hogan
- The Foolish Virgin (1924) – Chuck Brady
- The Overland Limited (1925) – Patrick Henry Madden
- Dollar Down (1925) – Gene Meadows
- You'd Be Surprised (1926) – Party Guest (uncredited)
- Ritzy (1927) – Smith's Valet
- Wings (1927) – Lieutenant Cameron
- Ten Modern Commandments (1927) – Benny Burnaway
- The Jazz Singer (1927) – Agent (uncredited)
- Beau Sabreur (1928) – Buddy
- The Trail of '98 (1928) – Man on Ship (uncredited)
- Something Always Happens (1928) – George
- The Desert Bride (1928) – Pvt. Terry
- The Vanishing Pioneer (1928) – Ray Hearn
- Warming Up (1928) – Hippo
- Jazz Mad (1928) – Sol Levy
- Win That Girl (1928) – Johnny Norton II
- Beggars of Life (1928) – Lame Hoppy
- Moran of the Marines (1928) – Swatty
- Object: Alimony (1928) – Al Bryant
- The Shopworn Angel (1928) – Dance Director
- The Flying Fleet (1929) – Shipwrecked Radio Operator (uncredited)
- Copy (1929 short) – City Editor John Mack
- This Thing Called Love (1929) – Harry Bertrand
- New York Nights (1929) – Johnny Dolan
- Troopers Three (1930) – Bugs
- Safety in Numbers (1930) – Bertram Shapiro
- The Little Accident (1930) – Gilbert
- Man Trouble (1930) – Scott
- The Costello Case (1930) – Blair
- The Gorilla (1930) – Simmons
- Dirigible (1931) – Sock McGuire
- Many a Slip (1931) – Stan Price
- Laughing Sinners (1931) – Fred Geer
- Pleasure (1931) – Arnie
- Left Over Ladies (1931) – 'Scoop'
- Ladies of the Big House (1931) – Frank – Twenty Questions player (uncredited)
- High Pressure (1932) – Telephone salesman (uncredited)
- Stowaway (1932) – Insp. Redding
- Play Girl (1932) – Gambler (uncredited)
- The Roadhouse Murder (1932) – Jeff Dale
- Week-End Marriage (1932) – Jim Davis
- Two Against the World (1932) – Segall, reporter
- The Crooked Circle (1932) – Harry Carter
- One Way Passage (1932) – S.S.Maloa Bartender (uncredited)
- Night After Night (1932) – Leo
- They Call It Sin (1932) – Brandt – Rehearsal Director (uncredited)
- If I Had a Million (1932) – Private O'Brien
- Under-Cover Man (1932) – Dannie
- Lawyer Man (1932) – Merritt – Reporter (uncredited)
- Grand Slam (1933) – Contest Radio Announcer
- Today We Live (1933) – McGinnis
- A Lady's Profession (1933) – Tony
- Gambling Ship (1933) – Blooey
- One Sunday Afternoon (1933) – Snappy Downer
- The Women in His Life (1933) – Lester
- Alice in Wonderland (1933) – Tweedledee
- Search for Beauty (1934) – Newspaper Reporter (scenes deleted)
- It Happened One Night (1934) – Oscar Shapeley
- Come On Marines! (1934) – Spud McGurke
- Twentieth Century (1934) – O'Malley
- Shoot the Works (1934) – Sailor Burke
- Elmer and Elsie (1934) – Rocky Cott
- I Sell Anything (1934) – Monk
- Wings in the Dark (1935) – Nick Williams
- Red Hot Tires (1935) – Bud Keene
- Four Hours to Kill! (1935) – Johnson
- Alibi Ike (1935) – Carey
- Front Page Woman (1935) – Toots O'Grady
- Two-Fisted (1935) – Chick Moran
- Woman Trap (1936) – Mopsy
- Border Flight (1936) – Calico Smith
- Three Cheers for Love (1936) – Doc "Short Circuit" Wilson
- Three Married Men (1936) – Peter Cary
- Cain and Mabel (1936) – Reilly
- Clarence (1937) – Clarence Smith
- Murder Goes to College (1937) – Sim Perkins
- Night of Mystery (1937) – Sgt. Heath
- On Such a Night (1937) – Joe Flynn
- Partners in Crime (1937) – Sim Perkins
- Scandal Street (1938) – Austin Brown
- Dangerous to Know (1938) – Duncan
- Tip-Off Girls (1938) – Tom Benson aka Tommy Logan
- You and Me (1938) – Cuffy
- Thanks for the Memory (1938) – George Kent
- King of Chinatown (1939) – 'Rip' Harrigan
- Dancing Co-Ed (1939) – Joe Drews
- Everything's on Ice (1939) – Felix Miller
- That's Right – You're Wrong (1939) – Mal Stamp
- His Girl Friday (1940) – Reporter McCue
- Double Alibi (1940) – Jeremiah Jenkins
- Saturday's Children (1940) – Willie Sands
- They Drive by Night (1940) – "Irish" McGurn
- Ladies Must Live (1940) – Pete H. 'Pighead' Larrabee
- Meet the Missus (1940) – Joe Higgins
- Petticoat Politics (1941) – Joe Higgins
- Footsteps in the Dark (1941) – Monahan
- Black Eyes and Blues (1941 short) – Alfred Harmon
- The Gay Vagabond (1941) – Arthur Dixon, Jerry Dixon
- Half Shot at Sunrise (1941, Short) – Henry Warren
- Road to Happiness (1942) – Charley Grady
- A Tragedy at Midnight (1942) – Det. Lt. Cassidy
- Woman Of The Year (1942) – Phil Whittaker
- Yokel Boy (1942) – Al Devers
- You Can't Escape Forever (1942) – 'Mac' McTurk
- My Son, the Hero (1943) – Big-Time Morgan
- Stage Door Canteen (1943) – Himself
- Riding High (1943) – Shorty (uncredited)
- His Butler's Sister (1943) – Fields
- Old Acquaintance (1943) – Charlie Archer
- The Navy Way (1944) – Frankie Gimble
- Hi, Good Lookin'! (1944) – Archie
- Minstrel Man (1944) – Roscoe
- One Way to Love (1946) – Hobie Simmons
- I Ring Doorbells (1946) – Stubby
- Avalanche (1946) – Red Kelly
- Down Missouri Way (1946) – Press Agent
- Vigilantes of Boomtown (1947) – Billy Delaney
- That's My Man (1947) – Toby Gleeton
- The Inside Story (1948) – Eustace Peabody
- Devil's Cargo (1948) – Lt. Hardy
- Speed to Spare (1948) – Kangaroo
- Texas, Brooklyn & Heaven (1948) – Carmody
- Onionhead (1958) – 'Windy' Woods
- Man's Favorite Sport? (1964) – Major Phipps
