= List of Grand National Pictures films =

List of films produced or distributed by the American studio Grand National Pictures between 1936 and 1939. Originally known as Grand National Films, the company reorganized as Grand National Pictures in 1938.

The company also handled a number of re-releases of earlier films, particularly those made by Chesterfield Pictures, which are not included. It also handled the American distribution of several British-made films.

== Films ==
Title	American release date	Director	Notes
Captain Calamity	April 17, 1936	John Reinhardt	
Too Much Beef	June 6, 1936	Robert F. Hill	
In His Steps	September 22, 1936	Karl Brown	
The Devil on Horseback	September 30, 1936	Crane Wilbur	
Spy of Napoleon	October 10, 1936	Maurice Elvey	Made in Britain
White Legion	October 25, 1936	Karl Brown	
Yellow Cargo	November 8, 1936	Crane Wilbur	
Song of the Gringo	November 22, 1936	John P. McCarthy	First Tex Ritter film
Hats Off	December 6, 1936	Boris Petroff	
We're in the Legion Now!	December 13, 1936	Crane Wilbur	
Headin' for the Rio Grande	December 20, 1936	Robert N. Bradbury	
Forget Me Not	December 31, 1936	Zoltan Korda	Made in Britain
Great Guy	January 2, 1937	John G. Blystone	
Lonely Road	January 23, 1937	James Flood	Made in Britain
Arizona Days	January 30, 1937	John English	
The Amazing Quest of Ernest Bliss	February 27, 1937	Alfred Zeisler	Made in Britain
Trouble in Texas	March 6, 1937	Robert N. Bradbury	
Navy Spy	March 13, 1937	Crane Wilbur	First Conrad Nagel Federal Agent series
23 1/2 Hours Leave	March 21, 1937	John G. Blystone	
Girl Loves Boy	March 27, 1937	Duncan Mansfield	
Hittin' the Trail	April 3, 1937	Robert N. Bradbury	
The Gold Racket	April 10, 1937	Louis J. Gasnier	
The Man in the Mirror	April 24, 1937	Maurice Elvey	Made in Britain
Juggernaut	April 30, 1937	Henry Edwards	Made in Britain
A Woman Alone	May 8, 1937	Eugene Frenke	Made in Britain
Damaged Goods	May 22, 1937	Phil Goldstone	
Sing, Cowboy, Sing	May 22, 1937	Robert N. Bradbury	
Bank Alarm	June 7, 1937	Louis J. Gasnier	
Sweetheart of the Navy	June 8, 1937	Duncan Mansfield	
Riders of the Rockies	July 2, 1937	Robert N. Bradbury	
Boots of Destiny	July 16, 1937	Arthur Rosson	
Dusty Ermine	July 23, 1937	Bernard Vorhaus	Made in Britain
The Mystery of the Hooded Horsemen	August 6, 1937	Ray Taylor	
Trailin' Trouble	August 27, 1937	Arthur Rosson	
Small Town Boy	September 24, 1937	Glenn Tryon	
Renfrew of the Royal Mounted	September 29, 1937	Albert Herman	First Renfrew of the Royal Mounted film
Something to Sing About	September 30, 1937	Victor Schertzinger	
The Girl Said No	October 15, 1937	Andrew L. Stone	
The Shadow Strikes	October 29, 1937	Lynn Shores	First The Shadow film
Love Takes Flight	November 5, 1937	Conrad Nagel	
Tex Rides with the Boy Scouts	November 26, 1937	Ray Taylor	
Wallaby Jim of the Islands	December 14, 1937	Charles Lamont	
Here's Flash Casey	January 7, 1938	Lynn Shores	
Spirit of Youth	January 20, 1938	Harry L. Fraser	
Mr. Boggs Steps Out	February 18, 1938	Gordon Wiles	
Swing It, Sailor!	February 4, 1938	Raymond Cannon	
Frontier Town	March 4, 1938	Ray Taylor	
Stardust	March 25, 1938	Melville W. Brown	
International Crime	April 22, 1938	Charles Lamont	
Whirlwind Horseman	April 29, 1938	Robert F. Hill	
Six-Shootin' Sheriff	May 20, 1938	Harry L. Fraser	
Songs and Saddles	June 1, 1938	Harry L. Fraser	
The Singing Cowgirl	June 2, 1938	Samuel Diege	First Dorothy Page singing cowgirl film
Held for Ransom	June 17, 1938	Clarence Bricker	
Secret Lives	July 1, 1938	Edmond T. Gréville	Made in Britain
Rollin' Plains	July 8, 1938	Albert Herman	
The High Command	July 15, 1938	Thorold Dickinson	Made in Britain
On the Great White Trail	July 22, 1938	Albert Herman	
The Marines Come Thru	August 5, 1938	Louis J. Gasnier	
The Utah Trail	August 12, 1938	Albert Herman	
Frontier Scout	September 16, 1938	Sam Newfield	
Shadows Over Shanghai	October 14, 1938	Charles Lamont	
Cipher Bureau	October 26, 1938	Charles Lamont	
Brief Ecstasy	October 28, 1938	Edmond T. Gréville	Made in Britain
Titans of the Deep	October 28, 1938	Otis Barton	
King of the Sierras	November 9, 1938	Arthur Rosson	
Sunset Murder Case	November 11, 1938	Louis J. Gasnier	
Long Shot	January 6, 1939	Charles Lamont	
Water Rustlers	January 6, 1939	Samuel Diege	
Trigger Pals	January 13, 1939	Sam Newfield	
Ride 'em, Cowgirl	January 20, 1939	Samuel Diege	
Six-Gun Rhythm	February 17, 1939	Sam Newfield	
The Mind of Mr. Reeder	March 11, 1939	Jack Raymond	Made in Britain
Panama Patrol	March 20, 1939	Charles Lamont	
Exile Express	May 27, 1939	Otis Garrett	
I Killed the Count	September 2, 1939	Frederic Zelnik	Made in Britain
I Met a Murderer	October 1, 1939	Roy Kellino	Made in Britain
Miracle on Main Street	December 19, 1939	Steve Sekely	Distributed by Columbia Pictures
Isle of Destiny	March 8, 1940	Elmer Clifton	Distributed by RKO Pictures

== See also ==
- List of Producers Releasing Corporation films

== Bibliography ==
- Slide, Anthony. The New Historical Dictionary of the American Film Industry. Routledge, 2014.
