= Yellow Cargo =

1936 film by Crane Wilbur

- Directed by: Crane Wilbur
- Written by: Crane Wilbur
- Produced by: Samuel Diege; George A. Hirliman; Edward L. Alperson
- Starring: Conrad Nagel; Eleanor Hunt; Vince Barnett
- Cinematography: Mack Stengler
- Edited by: Tony Martinelli
- Music by: Abe Meyer
- Production company: Condor Productions
- Distributed by: Grand National Films
- Release date: November 8, 1936
- Running time: 63 minutes
- Country: United States
- Language: English

Yellow Cargo is a 1936 American Poverty Row crime film written and directed by Crane Wilbur for Grand National Pictures. The film was rereleased in 1947 as Sinful Cargo. Starring Conrad Nagel as Alan O'Connor and producer George A. Hirliman's wife Eleanor Hunt as Bobbie Reynolds, it was the first of four G-man film series; the others were Navy Spy (1937), The Gold Racket (1937), and Bank Alarm (1937).

== Plot summary ==
Alan O'Connor, a Federal Agent with the Federal Bureau of Narcotics is transferred to the Immigration and Naturalization Service by flying to California in a Boeing 247, His mission is to use his expertise to assist them with identifying how a dangerous gang is infiltrating Chinese illegal immigrants into the United States. He meets newspaper reporter Bobbie Reynolds and her comedy relief photographer Speedy "Bulb" Callahan who are trying to obtain an interview with the director and producer of Globe Productions, a motion picture company who has yet to make a film. As O'Connor has stage acting experience, he his goaded by Reynolds to get a role with Globe Productions.

The trio discover that the film company brings twenty film extras in Chinese theatrical makeup to one of the Channel Islands of California to shoot a film. Production is stopped, the extras are shipped back to the mainland by a different ship, the original boat brings back the same number of Chinese to the mainland.

== Cast ==
- Conrad Nagel as Alan O'Connor
- Eleanor Hunt as Bobbie Reynolds
- Vince Barnett as Speedy 'Bulb' Callahan
- Jack La Rue as Al Perrelli
- Claudia Dell as Fay Temple
- Harry Strang as Joe Breeze - Bus Driver
- John Ivans as District Commissioner Dietrich
- Vance Carroll as Burke Darrell
- Lillian Wessner as Nurse
- Crane Wilbur as Montie Brace

== Production ==
Production of Yellow Cargo began on December 2, 1935, at the Talisman Studios in East Los Angeles.

== Reception ==
Variety wrote the film featured "a plot that has a certain amount of freshness and pretty good entertainment pull" with other reviewers acknowledging the film's innovative story and having solid production values for a low budget film.
