= Stolen Paradise (1940 film) =

- Film poster
- Directed by: Louis J. Gasnier
- Written by: Arthur Hoerl (scenario); Lawrence Meade (story); Robert Spafford (screenplay)
- Produced by: George A. Hirliman
- Starring: see below
- Cinematography: Jack Greenhalgh
- Music by: Nathaniel Shilkret
- Distributed by: Monogram Pictures Corporation
- Release date: December 1940
- Running time: 79 min.
- Language: English

Stolen Paradise also released as Adolescence is a 1940 youth film directed by Louis J. Gasnier and filmed in and around Coral Gables, Florida. Eleanor Hunt was married to producer George A. Hirliman.

== Plot ==
Eighteen-year-old Richard Gordon is a student at St Francis boarding school and is looking forward to eventually being ordained a Roman Catholic priest. His mentor Father O'Malley summons him with news that his father is remarrying (Richard's mother had died years ago) and wishes Richard to return home and study in a prestigious university. Richard is not keen on leaving St. Francis but Fr. O'Malley advises him that he should see a bit of life before making his decision to enter the clergy.

Dick eventually falls in love with his stepsister who is ten years older than he is. In the meantime he falls in with a fast crowd at his university and World War II is on the horizon....

== Cast ==
- Leon Janney ... Richard 'Dick' Gordon
- Eleanor Hunt ... Patricia Morrow
- Esther Muir ... Mrs. Ellen Gordon
- Wilma Francis ... Jerry Dean
- Doris Blaine ... Mary Hodge
- Herbert Fisher ... Father O'Malley
- Roy Tracy ... Tom Trowbridge
- Fred Nielsey ... Robert Gordon
- Mamie Smith ... Martha
- Charles Shaw ... Larry Hodge
- Billy Vines ... Salesman on Train
- Gilda Lynch ... Janet
