= Sunset Murder Case =

1938 film by Louis J. Gasnier

- Directed by: Louis J. Gasnier
- Written by: Harold Joyce (story "Sunset Strip Case" in Liberty Magazine); Paul Franklin (screenplay) and Arthur Hoerl (screenplay); Lawrence Meade (additional dialogue)
- Produced by: Sam Coslow (associate producer); George A. Hirliman (producer)
- Starring: Sally Rand; Esther Muir
- Cinematography: Mack Stengler
- Edited by: Martin G. Cohn
- Music by: Hugo Riesenfeld
- Distributed by: Grand National Pictures
- Release date: November 11, 1938
- Country: United States
- Language: English

Sunset Murder Case is a 1938 American film directed by Louis J. Gasnier and starring Sally Rand and Esther Muir.

The film is also known as High Explosive in the United Kingdom.

== Plot summary ==
After her policeman father is killed and nightclub singer Nina is murdered, Kathy posing as stripper Valerie goes to work underground to catch the gangster. Her boyfriend reporter Lou watches out for her.

== Cast ==
- Sally Rand as Kathy O'Connor / "Valerie"
- Henry King as Master of Ceremonies
- Esther Muir as Lora Wynne
- Lona Andre as Nita Madera - Murder victim
- Vince Barnett as Martin - Henchman
- Kathryn Kane as Penny Nichols - Nightclub act - singer
- Dennis Moore as Lou Fleming - Reporter
- Reed Hadley as Oliver Helton
- Paul Sutton as Bapti Stephani
- Stanley Price as Eric Martin - Henchman
- Frank O'Connor as Detective Sergeant Tom O'Connor
- Mary Brodel as Jane Baird
- George Douglas as Carlo Rossmore
- Bruce Mitchell as Everett
- Lester Dorr as Editor
- Eddie Gordon as Rankin
- Monte Carter as Staufer

== Release ==
The film was made in 1938 but not released until 1941 due to censors. The name was changed from "Sunset Strip" to "Sunset Murder". The studio Grand National went out of business and the order of the cast in the credits was changed as well.

== Soundtrack ==
- "I'd Rather Look at You" (Written by Sam Coslow)
