= Go-Get-'Em, Haines =

1936 film by Sam Newfield

- Directed by: Sam Newfield
- Written by: George Wallace Sayre (screenplay)
- Produced by: George A. Hirliman (producer)
- Starring: See below
- Cinematography: Edgar Lyons
- Edited by: Charles J. Hunt
- Distributed by: Republic Pictures
- Release date: June 16, 1936
- Running time: 63 minutes
- Country: United States
- Language: English

Go-Get-'Em, Haines is a 1936 American mystery film directed by Sam Newfield. It was William Boyd's last non-Hopalong Cassidy role.

== Plot ==
Ace reporter Steve Haines is on the trail of John Graham, the former head of a public utilities company that has bankrupted and defrauded its investors out of their life savings. Haines trails Graham to an ocean liner where he is planning to flee to Europe. During the voyage Haines is impressed by the company on the ship, including a famous actor and his singing daughter and a gangster. Haines organises a pantomime melodrama to entertain the passengers using his new acquaintances and convinces Graham to take a role playing a man who is murdered. Prior to going on the stage the fake revolver is replaced with a real one.

== Cast ==
- William Boyd as Steve Haines
- Sheila Terry as Jane Kent
- Eleanor Hunt as Gloria Palmer
- Lloyd Ingraham as Ship Captain Ward
- LeRoy Mason as Tony Marchetti
- Jimmy Aubrey as Reggie Parks
- Clarence Geldart as Henry Kent
- Lee Shumway as John Graham, posing as Frank Marion
- Louis Natheaux as Lindner, the Steward

== Production ==
The film was shot on an actual liner travelling from Los Angeles to Panama. Famed in his Western role of Hopalong Cassidy, Bill Boyd appeared in three 1936 films of non Western genre for Winchester Productions all produced by George A. Hirliman, directed by Sam Newfield, and released by Republic Pictures. The other films were Burning Gold and Federal Agent.

== Soundtrack ==
- Eleanor Hunt - "Oh Willie, Oh Willie, Come Back" (Written by Bernie Grossman and Sam Perry)
- Eleanor Hunt - "I'm So Sorry We Ever Met" (Written by Bernie Grossman and Sam Perry)

== Home media ==
Go-Get-'Em, Haines is now in the public domain. It is available from Alpha Video on a double-bill with Ten Laps to Go. The film can also be viewed and downloaded for free via the Internet Archive.
