= Evelyn Daw =

American singer and actress (1912–1970)

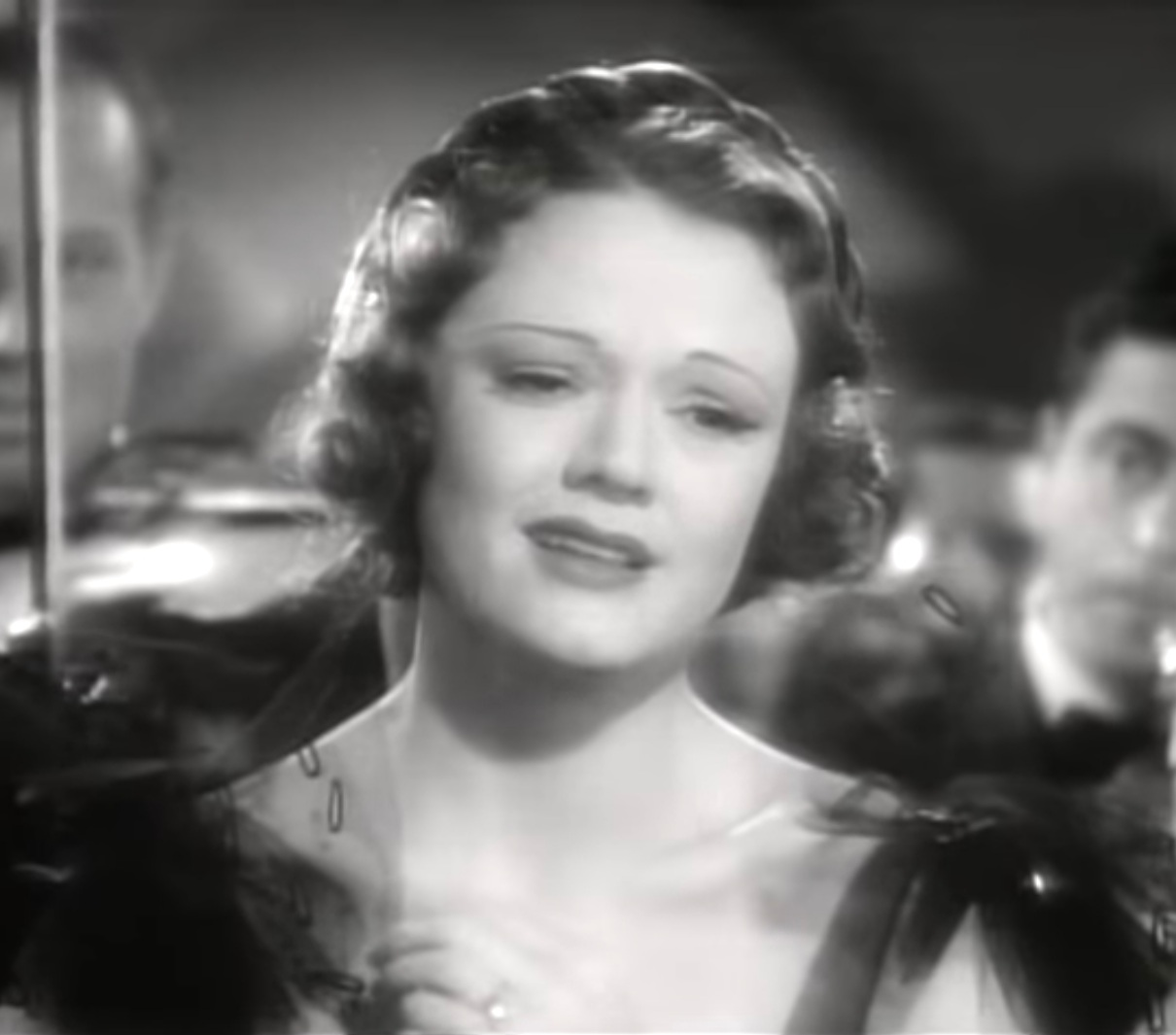
- Daw in Something to Sing About (1937)
- Born: Evelyn Pearl Shuck; November 16, 1912; Geddes, South Dakota, U.S.
- Died: November 29, 1970 (aged 58); San Diego, California, U.S.
- Education: Dakota Wesleyan University
- Occupations: Singer; actress (1937–1938)
- Years active: 1937–1952
- Spouse: Dr. Steward Herbert Smith (m. 1952)
- Children: 4

Evelyn Daw (born Evelyn Pearl Shuck; November 16, 1912 – November 29, 1970), was an American singer and actress.

== Early years ==
Born Evelyn Pearl Shuck, Daw was the daughter of Walter Shuck and Edith Miller Shuck of Geddes, South Dakota, both of whose families were pioneers who settled in South Dakota. As a child, she sang in her church choir and acted in school plays. After finishing high school in 1930, she attended Dakota Wesleyan University for one year before moving to Los Angeles to seek additional musical training. While studying voice, she filled in for soloists at two churches in Los Angeles.

== Career ==
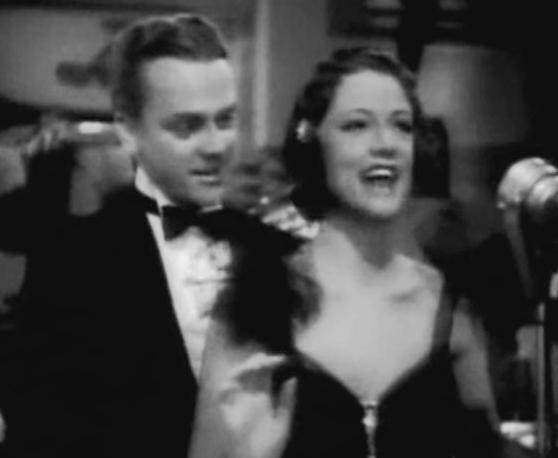
James Cagney and Evelyn Daw in Something to Sing About (1937).

Daw sang in operettas put on by local groups in Los Angeles, and a musician for one of the productions arranged for her to audition with director Victor Schertzinger. Her audition and screen test led to her appearance in the film Something to Sing About (1937), under contract with Grand National Films, Inc. That contract proved to be short-lived when the studio went into receivership and Daw was turned away from the pay window with no salary. She co-starred in the musical Western Panamint's Bad Man (1938) for another studio, but that was the end of her film career.

In 1940, Daw was a "general understudy for the stars" in the stage production Three after Three.

In the summer of 1941, Daw performed with the Palmerton Players at the Whalom Theater in Massachusetts. Her parts there ranged from a "noisy adolescent" in Fly Away Home to the title role in No, No, Nanette. She returned there to perform during other summers in the 1940s.

Daw sang with the Los Angeles Philharmonic and the Schubert Brothers in New York City. Beginning in 1941, she toured with the J. J. Shubert Opera Co. for 11 years. After she moved to San Diego, she performed with the Old Globe Theatre there.

After Daw's performing career ended, she became a teacher of piano and voice in Covina, California.

== Personal life and death ==
Daw was married to Dr. Stewart H. Smith Sr.; they had two daughters and two sons. On November 29, 1970, she died in San Diego, aged 58.

== Filmography ==
Year	Title	Role	Notes
1937	Something to Sing About	Rita Wyatt	Film debut
1938	Panamint's Bad Man	Joan DeLysa	Final film role
