= We're in the Legion Now =

1936 film by Crane Wilbur

- Film poster
- Directed by: Crane Wilbur
- Written by: J.D. Newsom (story "The Rest Cure"); Roger Whately (screenplay); Crane Wilbur (additional dialogue)
- Produced by: George A. Hirliman (producer); Charles J. Hunt (associate producer); Louis Rantz (associate producer)
- Starring: See below
- Cinematography: Mack Stengler
- Edited by: Tony Martinelli
- Distributed by: Grand National Films Inc.
- Release date: December 13, 1936
- Running time: 56 minutes
- Country: United States
- Language: English

We're in the Legion Now is a 1936 American adventure comedy film directed by Crane Wilbur and shot in Magnacolor. The film is also known as The Rest Cure (American reissue title), which was the title of the 1934 original J.D. Newsom story the film was based on.

== Plot ==
Two petty criminals are pursued by a gangster from the United States to Paris, France, where they enlist into the French Foreign Legion to escape. After being drafted to a garrison in North Africa, they fall foul of military authority and are sent to a sadistic punishment camp, where they lead an insurrection against its commanding officer, and then help to defeat a native Mohammedan revolt.

== Cast ==
- Reginald Denny as Dan Linton
- Esther Ralston as Louise Rillette
- Vince Barnett as Spike Conover
- Eleanor Hunt as Honey Evans
- Claudia Dell as Yvonne Cartier
- Robert Frazer as Capt. Henri Rillette
- Rudolph Anders as Sgt. Groeber
- Francisco Marán as Abdul Ben-Abou
- Merrill McCormick as Ali
- Frank Hoyt as Adjutant Cartellini
- Manuel Peluffo as Military Prisoner
- Charles Moyer as Recruit Ringleader
- Lou Hicks as Al Petrelli, American Gangster

== See also ==
- List of early color feature films
