= Dixie Flyer =

Dixie Flyer(s) may refer to:

== Transportation ==
- Dixie Flyer (automobile), an automobile built in Louisville, Kentucky from 1916 until 1923
- Dixie Flyer (train), a premier Chicago-to-Florida passenger train that ran from 1892 to 1966 over several railroads.

== Music ==
- Dixie Flyers, a Canadian bluegrass band
- Dixie Flyers, an American studio band formed by Sammy Creason
- Dixie Flyers, the band behind American jazz musician Joe Darensbourg
- "Dixie Flyer", a song composed by Thomas Jefferson Kaye
- "Dixie Flyer", a song composed by Walter Melrose
- "Dixie Flyer", a song composed by Randy Newman
- "Dixie Flyer", a song composed by Jim Photoglo
- "Dixie Flyer", a song composed by Marty Stuart
- "Southern Dixie Flyer", a song composed by Marty Robbins

== Film ==
- The Dixie Flyer, silent film

== Sports ==
- Nashville Dixie Flyers, an American minor hockey league team
- Claude Bracey or The Dixie Flyer, American sprinter
- Bucky Moore or The Dixie Flyer, American football player
