= Something to Sing About (1937 film) =

1937 film by Victor Schertzinger

- original theatrical poster
- Directed by: Victor Schertzinger
- Written by: Victor Schertzinger (story); Austin Parker (screenplay)
- Produced by: Zion Meyers
- Starring: James Cagney; Evelyn Daw; William Frawley
- Cinematography: John Stumar
- Edited by: Gene Milford
- Music by: Myrl Alderman (score–uncredited); Victor Schertzinger (songs)
- Production company: Zion Meyers Productions
- Distributed by: Grand National Pictures
- Release date: September 30, 1937 (United States)
- Running time: 93 minutes 89 minutes
- Country: United States
- Language: English
- Budget: $900,000 ($14.8 million in 2015)

Something to Sing About (1937), re-released in 1947 as Battling Hoofer, is the second and final film James Cagney made for Grand National Pictures – the first being Great Guy – before mending relations with and returning to Warner Bros. It is one of the few films besides Footlight Parade and Yankee Doodle Dandy to showcase Cagney's singing and dancing talents. It was directed by Victor Schertzinger, who also wrote the music and lyrics of the original songs, as well as the story that Austin Parker's screenplay is based on. Cagney's co-stars are Evelyn Daw and William Frawley, and the film features performances by Gene Lockhart and Mona Barrie.

The film, which is a satire on the movie industry's foibles, flopped in theaters, causing the just recently started "Poverty Row" independent Grand National, which had gone significantly overbudget making the film, to close its doors in 1940.

When, at 80 years of age, Cagney was asked which of his films – outside of Yankee Doodle Dandy – that he'd like to see again, this was the film he chose. Since the copyright on the film was not renewed in 1965, the film is now in the public domain in the United States.

== Plot ==
"Terry Rooney" (James Cagney) is the stage name of Thaddeus McGillicuddy, a popular New York band leader and hoofer with a radio show, who gets an offer to go to Hollywood to make movies. He leaves behind his fiancée, the band's singer, Rita Wyatt (Evelyn Daw), and finds himself in the hands of studio boss B.O. Regan (Gene Lockhart), who sets a team of studio professionals to mold Rooney into a star. Regan, after struggling with another new talent who quickly developed an uncontrollable ego, also secretly insists that no one praise Rooney's work, on pain of being fired.

While shooting a bar fight for his first film, a stunt man who is supposed to throw a fake punch at Rooney hits him deliberately instead. Rooney retaliates, and a full-out fistfight breaks out. Disgusted with Hollywood, Rooney leaves to marry Wyatt, and for a honeymoon takes her on a tramp steamer for a cruise to the South Seas, ending up in San Francisco.

While they are away, the film is completed and premiered, and becomes a huge hit – but, to Regan's dismay, nobody in the studio knows where Rooney is. When he is finally spotted in San Francisco, Regan flies out immediately with a contract, a clause of which requires Rooney to remain single for its seven-year duration. Rooney and Wyatt agree to keep their relationship quiet, with Wyatt posing as Rooney's secretary.

Another film is begun, with Rooney acting alongside Stephanie Hajos (Mona Barrie), and to promote it, studio publicist Hank Meyers (William Frawley) plants news stories saying that Rooney and Hajos are love interests off-screen. The combined stress of having their marriage remain a secret, while Rooney has less and less time for her, eventually drives Wyatt back to New York. Hajos finds out that Rooney is not only not interested in her but is married; the story breaks to the papers, and Rooney returns to Wyatt and their band in New York with a front-page article declaring his relationship with Hojas a hoax.

== Cast ==
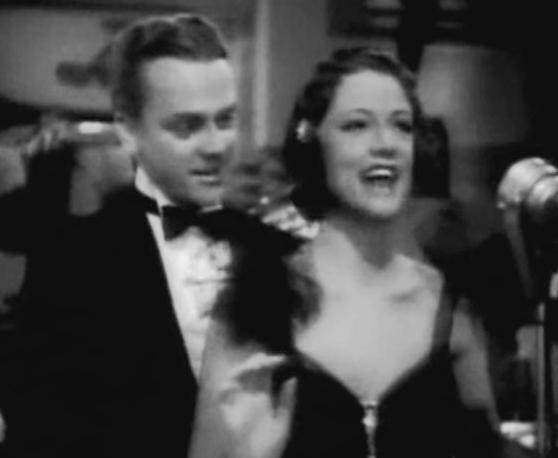
Cagney and Evelyn Daw, who made her screen debut in Something to Sing About.

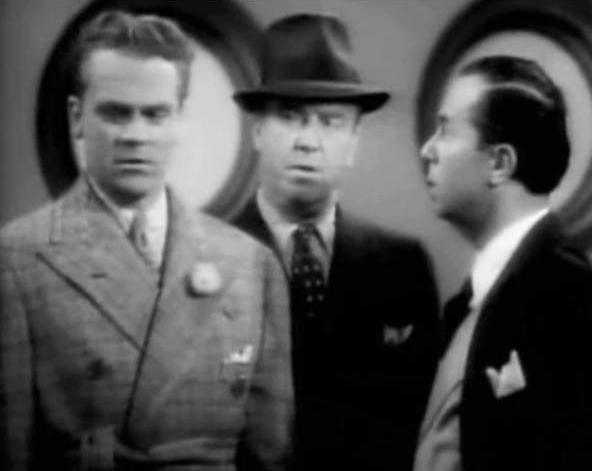
Cagney, William Frawley and Marek Windheim.

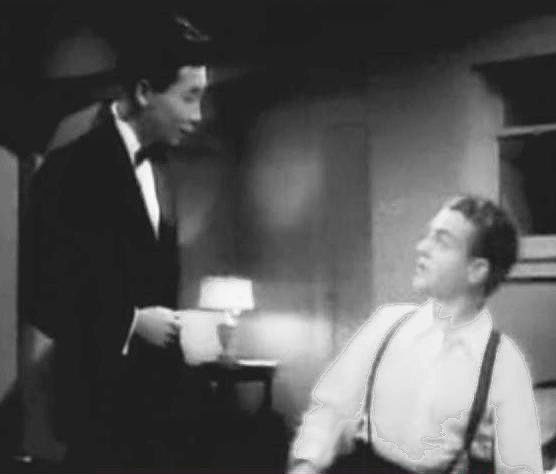
Philip Ahn and Cagney.

- James Cagney as Thadeus McGillicuddy, aka Terrence "Terry" Rooney
- Evelyn Daw as Rita Wyatt
- William Frawley as Hank Meyers
- Mona Barrie as Stephanie "Steffie" Hajos
- Gene Lockhart as Bennett O. "B.O." Regan
- Philip Ahn as Ito, Terry's man-servant
- Marek Windheim as Mr. Farney, dialogue director
- Dwight Frye as Mr. Easton, makeup supervisor
- Johnny Arthur as Mr. Daviani, wardrobe supervisor
- William B. Davidson as Mr. Richards, nightclub owner
- Richard Tucker as Mr. Blaine, the director
- Kathleen Lockhart as Miss Amy Robbins, newspaper columnist
- James Newill as Jimmy, band member
- Harry Barris as Pinky, pianist in the band
- Cully Richards as Cully, band member

Cast notes

- Evelyn Daw, a 20-year-old legit soprano from Geddes, South Dakota, was singing with the Los Angeles Philharmonic when she was "discovered" by director Schertzinger. This was her first film, and she would go on to make one more the next year, Panamint's Bad Man, a singing cowboy film. Afterwards, she continued to work in theater and opera.
- Philip Ahn, a Korean-American actor who had nearly been rejected by director Lewis Milestone from Anything Goes the prior year because his English was too good, plays Ito, a Japanese man who wants to be an actor and has instead been relegated to being a man-servant, assigned by the studio to Rooney. Ito has been forced by previous masters to speak with a thick Japanese accent and a minimum of English words. He reveals to Rooney that this is a pretense. Ito keeps the pretense up around others for most of the film, until he gets tired of being ordered around by Meyers and announces in impeccable English – amidst a cast full of accents and casual pronunciations – that he came to Hollywood to be an actor and not a servant, and that he is quitting.
- Kathleen Lockhart, who plays a newspaper columnist, was the wife of Gene Lockhart, who played the studio boss, "B.O." Regan. Their daughter, June Lockhart also became an actress, as did her daughter, Anne Lockhart.

== Production ==
Something to Sing About was in production at Grand National's studios on Santa Monica Boulevard in Hollywood from late June to late July 1937, under the working title "When I'm with You". Evelyn Daw was not the studio's first choice for the part of Cagney's love interest: they initially announced that Helen Jepson would play the part.

Because of the expense of making this film, and its poor box office, Grand National went bankrupt in 1940. The next film they had planned for Cagney was Angels With Dirty Faces, which ended up being bought by Warners and filmed with Cagney in the lead.

== Musical numbers ==
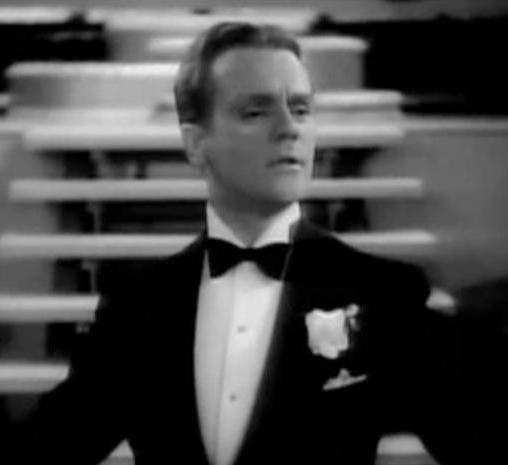
James Cagney as "Terry Rooney" in the opening number.

The film includes five songs and three dances. Cagney's dancing and singing open and close the film, and the opening number also incorporates singing from Rooney and Wyatt's bandmates as well as from Daw.

In one scene on the tramp steamer, Cagney dances with his long-time friends from vaudeville Johnny Boyle and Harland Dixon – two of the major sources of inspiration for his dancing style – which Cagney called one of the great moments of his life and a "privilege". Boyle was the person who taught Cagney George M. Cohan's dancing style, which he later used to good effect in Yankee Doodle Dandy, and Dixon, who staged the dances for Something to Sing About, was Cagney's dance instructor in New York before Cagney's Broadway breakthrough in Penny Arcade in 1930.

The dancing is in Cagney's inimitable style, which mixes vaudeville, tap, jigs, and semi-ballet. According to an article in The New York Times, Cagney would occasionally go over his steps with Fred Astaire before the dances were filmed.

The songs – "Something to Sing About", "Right or Wrong", "Any Old Love", "Out of the Blue" and "Loving You" – were all written, music and lyrics, by the film's director and scenarist, Victor Schertzinger.

== Response ==
Although the critical response was generally favorable, the film could not overcome the lack of wide distribution caused by its release by a newly formed independent company bucking a system dominated by the major studios. With no breakout songs in the not very memorable score, there was little chance of the film succeeding.

Something to Sing About was re-released in 1947 by Screencraft Pictures under the title Battling Hoofer.

== Awards and honors ==
Victor Schertzinger and the film's music director, Constantin Bakaleinikoff were nominated for a 1937 Academy Award for "Best Music (Scoring)", along with 13 other films. The award was won by One Hundred Men and a Girl.

== Home media ==
Because the film is in the public domain, DVD releases of it are available from a number of companies, including Alpha Video, CATCOM Home Video, Critic's Choice, Dollar Entertainment, Image Entertainment, Ovation Home Video, Reel Enterprises, ROAN, Syngery Enterprises, Unforgettable and Vina Distributors. It is also widely available for download on the Internet.

== See also ==
- List of films in the public domain in the United States
- Poverty Row - appellation for small, independent American film studios, many located on Gower Gulch
- Studio system

== Notes ==
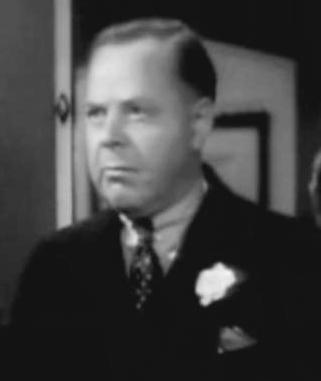
Gene Lockhart plays studio boss "B.O." Regan
