= Fred Keating (magician) =

American magician (1901–1961)

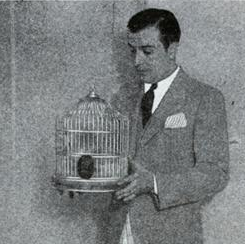
- Born: March 27, 1901; New York City, U.S.
- Died: June 29, 1961 (aged 60); New York City, U.S.
- Occupations: Magician, actor
- Years active: 1929–1940 (film)

Frederic Serrano Keating (March 27, 1901 – June 29, 1961), (Note: While his New York Times obituary reported that he died aged 64, suggesting a birth year of 1897, primary sources – including New York birth indexes and census records – indicate he was born in 1901.) best known as Fred Keating, was an American magician, stage, and film actor.

== Biography ==
Keating was born in New York City, the son of Frederick Keating (Senior), a lawyer, and Camille Serrano, a singer. He was of Irish-Spanish heritage. His parents divorced when he was young. He became interested in magic from an early age. He became well known for performing a disappearing canary cage trick. Keating also performed a trick where he swallowed needles and pulled them threaded, out of his mouth.

== Selected filmography ==
- The Captain Hates the Sea (1934)
- Shanghai (1935)
- I Live My Life (1935)
- To Beat the Band (1935)
- The Nitwits (1935)
- The Casino Murder Case (1935)
- The Devil on Horseback (1936)
- When's Your Birthday? (1937)
- Melody for Two (1937)
- Prison Train (1938)
- Eternally Yours (1939)
- Society Smugglers (1939)
- Tin Pan Alley (1940)

== Bibliography ==
- Curry, Paul. (1965). Magician's Magic. Dover Publications.
- Pitts, Michael R. (2015). RKO Radio Pictures Horror, Science Fiction and Fantasy Films, 1929-1956. McFarland.
- Price, David. (1985). Magic: A Pictorial History of Conjurers in the Theater. Cornwall Books.
- Slide, Anthony. (1981). The Vaudevillians: A Dictionary of Vaudeville Performers. Arlington House.
