= Vince Barnett =

American actor (1902–1977)

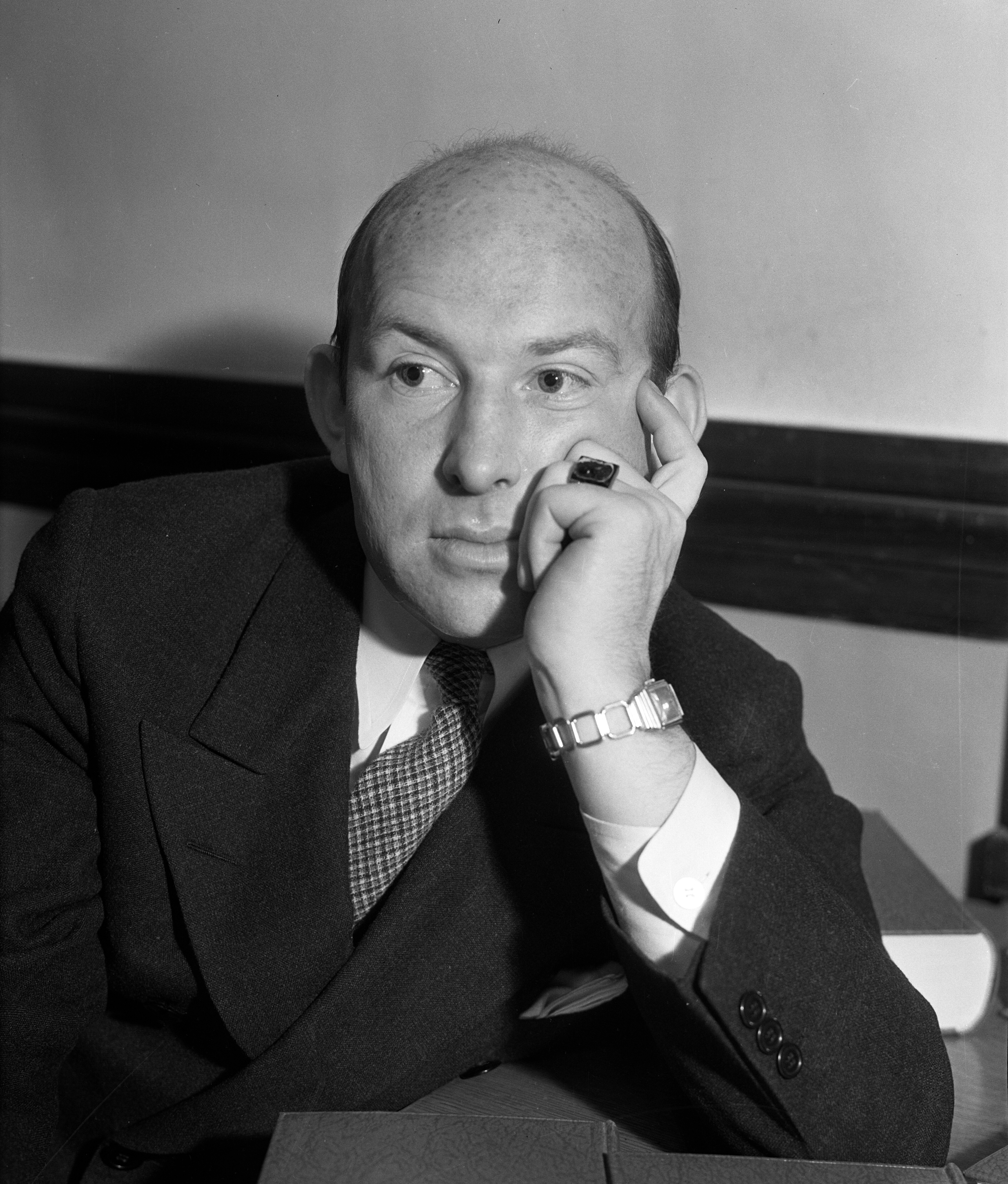
- Vince Barnett in 1936
- Born: July 4, 1902; Pittsburgh, Pennsylvania, U.S.
- Died: August 10, 1977 (aged 75); Encino, California, U.S.
- Resting place: Hollywood Forever Cemetery
- Occupation: Actor
- Years active: 1930–1975
- Spouses: Genevieve Meier (m. 1929; died 1955) Kit Barnett (m. 1971)

Vince Barnett (July 4, 1902 – August 10, 1977) was an American film actor. He began his career on stage before appearing in more than 230 films between 1930 and 1975.

== Early years ==
Barnett was born July 4, 1902, in Pittsburgh, Pennsylvania, the son of Luke Barnett, a well-known comedian who specialized in insulting and pulling practical jokes on his audiences. (Luke's professional nickname was "Old Man Ribber" and "the King of Ribbing".)

Barnett graduated from Duquesne University Prep School and the Carnegie Institute of Technology. An avid amateur pilot beginning in 1921, he flew mail planes during 1925-1926. Barnett appeared on Broadway in Earl Carroll's Vanities during 1927.

== Professional joker ==
A 1932 newspaper report noted that "Barnett for years [was] known in Hollywood as the 'professional ribber' -- appearing at banquets and parties as a paid 'insulter.'" He would insult the guests in a thick German accent, spill the soup, and drop the trays—all to the great delight of hosts who enjoyed watching their friends squirm and mutter "Who hired that jerk?" Wrote author Ephraim Katz, "Among the celebrated 'victims' of his practical jokes were President Franklin D. Roosevelt, Winston Churchill, George Bernard Shaw, Henry Ford, and Charles Lindbergh."

During the transition from silent films to sound, an employee at Metro-Goldwyn-Mayer hired Barnett to prank Louis B. Mayer. He impersonated a sound expert and went with Mayer to a soundstage being built, criticizing the construction and using double-talk to confuse him. He ended his evaluation by proclaiming that the whole soundstage needed to be torn down, and Mayer was about to order it done before his co-workers revealed the prank. David Niven, in his 1975 memoir, recalled Barnett posing as an important German director at a banquet attended by Samuel Goldwyn. Barnett gave Goldwyn an uncomfortable time: "With a heavy German accent, he said that he was a little surprised that Goldwyn had been invited to meet him because he considered him to be the least talented filmmaker in the United States, [and] the only reason he had brought the Russian actress Anna Sten out to Hollywood was because he wanted to get into her bloomers."

== Film ==
Vince Barnett's initial involvement with Hollywood was as a screenwriter, "writing screenplays for the two-reeler movies of the late 1920s."

He began appearing in films in 1930, playing hundreds of comedy bits and supporting parts until retiring in 1975. Among his screen roles was the gangster "secretary" in Scarface. From 1930 Barnett appeared, usually as comedy relief, in films and on television in a career spanning 45 years. Among his early roles, apart from Scarface, were The Big Cage (1933), Thirty Day Princess (1934) and Princess O'Hara (1935). In later years, Barnett played straight character parts, often as careworn little men, undertakers, janitors, bartenders and drunks in pictures ranging from films noir (The Killers, 1946) to westerns (Springfield Rifle, 1952). He appeared in "B" comedies and mysteries: as gangsters in Petticoat Larceny (1943), Little Miss Broadway (1947), and Gas House Kids Go West (1947), and notably as Tom Conway's enthusiastic sidekick in The Falcon's Alibi (1946). After World War II, with the Hollywood studios making fewer films, Barnett became a familiar face on television.

== Later years ==
In one of his last public appearances, Barnett showcased his unique brand of humor with a monologue, delivered at Madison Square Garden in the 1972 vaudeville revue The Big Show of 1936.

During the 1950s, Barnett owned a restaurant, "Barnett's", in Santa Monica at 826 Wilshire Boulevard.

== Death ==
Barnett died of heart disease August 10, 1977, at Encino Hospital Medical Center. He was buried in Hollywood Forever Cemetery.

== Selected filmography ==
- Wide Open (1930) - Dvorak
- All Quiet on the Western Front (1930) - Assistant Cook (uncredited)
- Night Work (1930) - Headwaiter (uncredited)
- Her Man (1930) - Waiter (uncredited)
- One Heavenly Night (1931) - Egon, Chauffeur (uncredited)
- Scandal Sheet (1931) - Barrett, Convict Reporter (uncredited)
- Side Show (1931) - The Great Santini (uncredited)
- Scratch-As-Catch-Can (1931, Short)
- Scarface (1932) - Angelo
- Horse Feathers (1932) - Speakeasy Patron (uncredited)
- The Night Mayor (1932) - Louis Mossbaum, Tailor
- Tiger Shark (1932) - Fishbone
- Heritage of the Desert (1932) - Windy
- Rackety Rax (1932) - 'Dutch'
- The Death Kiss (1932) - Officer Gulliver
- Flesh (1932) - Waiter
- Hallelujah, I'm a Bum (1933) - Assistant (uncredited)
- Fast Workers (1933) - Spike
- The Big Cage (1933) - Soupmeat
- Made on Broadway (1933) - Snitz Lepedis
- The Girl in 419 (1933) - Otto Hoffer
- Sunset Pass (1933) - Windy
- Tugboat Annie (1933) - Cab Driver (uncredited)
- Man of the Forest (1933) - Little
- The Prizefighter and the Lady (1933) - Bugsie
- The Ninth Guest (1934) - William Jones
- Madame Spy (1934) - Peter
- Registered Nurse (1934) - Jerry
- Thirty-Day Princess (1934) - Count Nicholaus
- Now I'll Tell (1934) - Peppo
- The Cat's-Paw (1934) - Wilks - a Gangster
- The Affairs of Cellini (1934) - Ascanio
- She Loves Me Not (1934) - Baldy Schultz
- Take the Stand (1934) - Tony
- Kansas City Princess (1934) - Quincy - Dynamite's Henchman
- Young and Beautiful (1934) - Sammy
- No Ransom (1934) - Bullet
- Crimson Romance (1934) - The Courier
- Hell in the Heavens (1934) - Ace McGurk
- The Secret Bride (1934) - Drunk in Diner
- Princess O'Hara (1935) - Fingers
- Black Fury (1935) - Kubanda
- Silk Hat Kid (1935) - Mr. Rabinowitz
- Don't Bet on Blondes (1935) - Chuck aka 'Brains'
- Champagne for Breakfast (1935) - Bennie
- Streamline Express (1935) - Mr. Jones
- I Live My Life (1935) - Clerk
- Riffraff (1936) - Lew
- Dancing Feet (1936) - Willoughby
- Captain Calamity (1936) - Burp
- Down to the Sea (1936) - Hector
- San Francisco (1936) - New Year's Eve Drunk (uncredited)
- I Cover Chinatown (1936) - Puss McGaffey - the Bus Driver
- Yellow Cargo (1936) - Speedy 'Bulbs' Callahan
- We're in the Legion Now! (1936) - Spike Conover
- After the Thin Man (1936) - Wrestling Manager at Party (uncredited)
- The Woman I Love (1937) - Mathieu
- A Star Is Born (1937) - Otto (uncredited)
- Bank Alarm (1937) - Clarence 'Bulb' Callahan
- Boots of Destiny (1937) - Acey Ducey - Sidekick
- The Singing Cowgirl (1938) - Kewpie
- The Headleys at Home (1938) - Vince Bergson
- Sunset Murder Case (1938) - Barney
- Water Rustlers (1939) - Mike - the cook
- Ride 'em, Cowgirl (1939) - Dan Haggerty
- Exile Express (1939) - Deputy Constable
- Overland Mail (1939) - Porchy
- Heroes of the Saddle (1940) - Night Watchman
- East Side Kids (1940) - Whisper
- Boys of the City (1940) - Simp
- Stranger on the Third Floor (1940) - Cafe Customer (uncredited)
- Seven Sinners (1940) - Bartender
- A Girl, a Guy, and a Gob (1941) - Bystander with Packages (uncredited)
- Mr. District Attorney (1941) - Coroner's Messenger (uncredited)
- Paper Bullets (1941) - Scribbler, a Petty Forger
- Blondie in Society (1941) - Mr. Wade (uncredited)
- Puddin' Head (1941) - Otis Tarbell
- A Dangerous Game (1941) - Ephriam
- Jungle Man (1941) - Buckthorn - 'Buck' the Guide
- Sierra Sue (1941) - Shooting-Gallery Pitchman (uncredited)
- I Killed That Man (1941) - Drunk
- Blonde Comet (1941) - Curly
- Pardon My Stripes (1942) - Bartender (uncredited)
- Girls' Town (1942) - Dimitri
- Klondike Fury (1942) - Alaska
- The Corpse Vanishes (1942) - Sandy
- Gallant Lady (1942) - Baldy
- Stardust on the Sage (1942) - Sam Haskins
- My Favorite Spy (1942) - Kay's 2nd Taxi Driver (uncredited)
- The Phantom Plainsmen (1942) - Deputy (uncredited)
- Baby Face Morgan (1942) - Lefty Lewis
- Foreign Agent (1942) - Drunk
- Bowery at Midnight (1942) - Charley
- X Marks the Spot (1942) - George
- Queen of Broadway (1942) - Schultz
- Thundering Trails (1943) - Jailer (uncredited)
- The Crime Smasher (1943) - Henchman 'Gimp'
- Kid Dynamite (1943) - Klinkhammer
- High Explosive (1943) - Truck Driver (uncredited)
- Captive Wild Woman (1943) - Curley
- Petticoat Larceny (1943) - Stogie
- Danger! Women at Work (1943) - Benny
- Tornado (1943) - Albany Alvin (uncredited)
- Sweethearts of the U.S.A. (1944) - Clipper - 3rd Robber
- The Mask of Dimitrios (1944) - Card Game Kibitzer (uncredited)
- Leave It to the Irish (1944) - Barney Baker
- The Big Show-Off (1945) - Voice Teacher's Student (uncredited)
- High Powered (1945) - Worker at Dance
- Thrill of a Romance (1945) - Oscar
- River Gang (1945) - Organ Grinder
- Sensation Hunters (1945) - Agent
- The Falcon's Alibi (1946) - Goldie Locke
- The Virginian (1946) - Baldy
- Two Sisters from Boston (1946) - Singing Waiter (uncredited)
- Bowery Bombshell (1946) - Street Cleaner
- The Killers (1946) - Charleston
- No Leave, No Love (1946) - Ben
- Swell Guy (1946) - Sam Burns
- The Mighty McGurk (1947) - Tailor (uncredited)
- My Brother Talks to Horses (1947) - Schuyler (uncredited)
- I Cover Big Town (1947) - Louis Murkil
- Shoot to Kill (1947) - Charlie Gill
- Gas House Kids Go West (1947) - Steve
- Little Miss Broadway (1947) - Mack Truck
- The Trespasser (1947) - Bartender
- Brute Force (1947) - Muggsy - Convict in Kitchen
- Joe Palooka in the Knockout (1947) - Russell
- The Flame (1947) - Stage Door Attendant (uncredited)
- Big Town After Dark (1947) - Louie Snead
- High Wall (1947) - Henry Cronner
- Big Town Scandal (1948) - Louie Snead
- Thunder in the Pines (1948) - Bernard - Bartender
- Loaded Pistols (1948) - Sam Gardner
- Knock on Any Door (1949) - Carl Swanson - Bartender (uncredited)
- Big Jack (1949) - Tom Speed (uncredited)
- Deputy Marshall (1949) - Hotel Desk Clerk
- Mule Train (1950) - Joe - Barber
- Storm Over Wyoming (1950) - Telegraph Clerk (uncredited)
- The Second Woman (1950) - Giovanni Strobini (uncredited)
- Border Treasure (1950) - Pokey
- International Burlesque (1950)
- Hunt the Man Down (1950) - Joe (uncredited)
- Kentucky Jubilee (1951) - Mugsy
- I'll See You in My Dreams (1951) - Burlesk Comedian (uncredited)
- On Dangerous Ground (1951) - George (uncredited)
- Red Planet Mars (1952) - Seedy Man Listening to Radio (uncredited)
- Carson City (1952) - Henry
- Springfield Rifle (1952) - Cook (uncredited)
- The Jazz Singer (1952) - Bartender (uncredited)
- Charade (1953) - Berg
- Ring of Fear (1954) - Vendor (uncredited)
- The Human Jungle (1954) - Old Mugging Victim (uncredited)
- The Crooked Web (1955) - Ed, Stan's Partner in Drive-In (uncredited)
- The Quiet Gun (1957) - Undertaker
- Outlaw Queen (1957) - Gamler
- Monkey on My Back (1957) - Mushy - Barney's Trainer (uncredited)
- Girl on the Run (1958) - Janitor
- The Rookie (1959) - 1st Janitor
- Zebra in the Kitchen (1965) - Man in Manhole
- The Family Jewels (1965) - Oil Change Customer (uncredited)
- Dr. Goldfoot and the Bikini Machine (1965) - Janitor
- Green Acres, ‘An Old-Fashioned Christmas’ (1966, TV Series) - Gus
- Andy Griffith Show (1967–1968, TV Series) - Elmo
- The Spy in the Green Hat (1967) - 'Scissors'
- The Big Mouth (1967) - Man at Telephone Booth (uncredited)
- The Fastest Guitar Alive (1967) - Prescott Townsman (uncredited)
- Mayberry R.F.D. (1968–1970, TV Series) - Elmo
- Summer School Teachers (1974) - Principal Adams
- Crazy Mama (1975) - Homer
- Sixpack Annie (1975) - Bartender
