= Renee Torres =

American actress

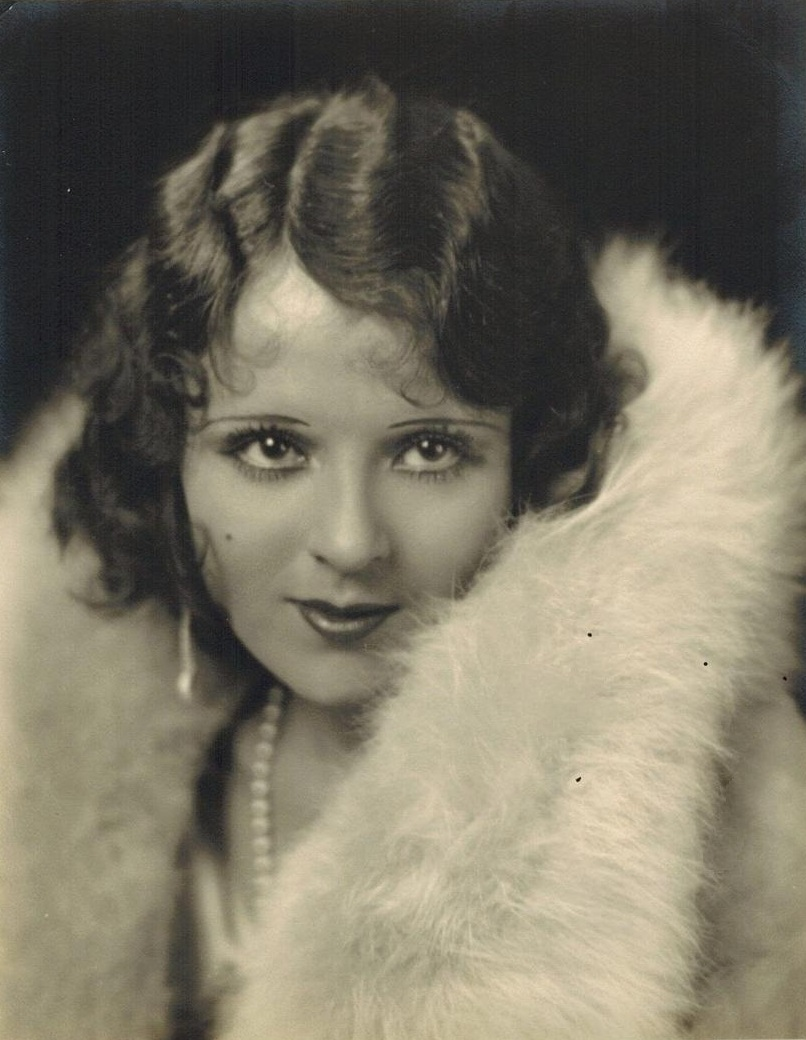
- Born: Renee Osterman; March 17, 1911; Hermosillo, Mexico
- Died: December 27, 1998 (aged 87); Sykesville, Maryland, U.S.
- Occupation: Actress
- Years active: 1930–1939
- Spouse(s): Erman Pessis (m. 1937; div. 1938) Edward Ashley (m. 1943)
- Relatives: Raquel Torres (sister)

Renee Torres (née Osterman; March 17, 1911 – December 27, 1998) was a Mexican-born American actress and the younger sister of Hollywood star Raquel Torres. Half-German and half-Mexican, she appeared in a number of 1930s films, including The Devil on Horseback (1936), Captain Blood (1937), and God's Country and the Woman (1937).

== Negligent driver ==
On July 11, 1930, Torres had a traffic accident in which she was charged with hit and run driving and named in a $1,752 damage suit. The plaintiffs charged she had been driving in a reckless manner. She explained to the presiding judge that she left the scene because she had been driving while wearing a pair of beach pajamas. She demonstrated this to him by removing her long coat and walking forward, clad in the pajamas. Torres did not go to jail.

== Personal life ==
Torres was married at least four times. She wed for the second time on January 16, 1937, to studio publicity man Erman Pessis (born March 20, 1913 — died November 16, 2008). She gave her age on that occasion as 25, which would correspond to a 1911 year of birth, and mentioned a previous union. They were married in Beverly Hills, California. Renee left Pessis in April 1938 and sued him for divorce in Reno, Nevada the same month. She claimed that the Hollywood press agent was familiar with other women and at one time had bound her hands behind her back and thrown her on the floor in the presence of other people. The divorce was granted on May 18, 1938. The legal dispute over the settlement amount continued until 1945. Originally Miss Torres asked for an amount of $2,000. Pessis contended he owed her a mere $75.

Torres' last marriage was to film actor Edward Ashley in 1943 in Acapulco, Mexico. The couple returned to Acapulco in 1947 when Ashley was filming Tarzan And The Mermaids. She and Ashley lived in Ocean Hills in Oceanside, California and preceded him in death there on December 27, 1998 at the age of 87.

== Sources ==
- Fresno Bee, July 19, 1938, p. 4A.
- Los Angeles Times, "Renee Torres Made Bride Of Studio Publicity Man", January 17, 1937, p. 5.
- Los Angeles Times, "Mate's Kissing Proclivities Win Renee Torres Divorce", May 19, 1938, p. 3.
- Los Angeles Times, "Actress and Ex-Mate Disagree-$1200 Worth", October 19, 1945, p. 2.
- The News Herald, Women's Daily Feature Page, February 21, 1932, p. 5.
- Oakland Tribune, "Was She Going Too Fast?", August 2, 1930, p. B3.
- Oakland Tribune, "Film Actress Glides Off After Auto Crash to Hide Her Beach Attire", August 14, 1930, p. D13.
- Woodland Daily Democrat, "Another for John?", Thursday, July 18, 1935, p. 2.
