= Thirty-Day Princess =

1934 film by Marion Gering

Thirty Day Princess
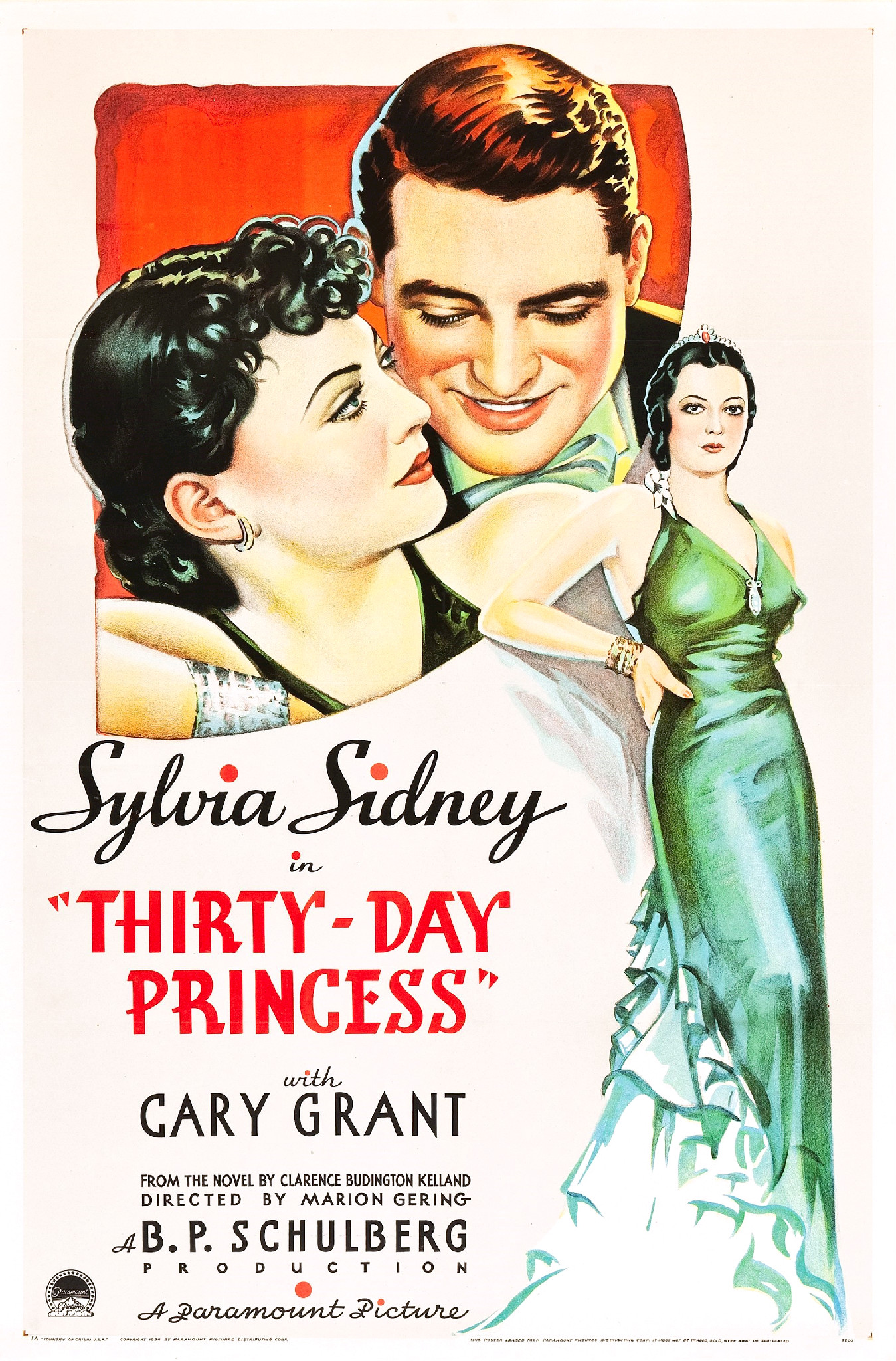
- theatrical poster
- Directed by: Marion Gering
- Written by: Adaptation: Sam Hellman; Edwin Justus Mayer; Screenplay: Preston Sturges; Frank Partos
- Based on: Thirty-Day Princess; 1933 story in Ladies' Home Journal by Clarence Budington Kelland
- Produced by: B.P. Schulberg
- Starring: Sylvia Sidney; Cary Grant; Edward Arnold
- Cinematography: Leon Shamroy
- Edited by: Jane Loring
- Music by: Howard Jackson; Rudolph G. Kopp; John Leipold; Harry Ruby; Karl Hajos
- Distributed by: Paramount Pictures
- Release date: May 18, 1934
- Running time: 74 minutes
- Country: United States
- Language: English

Thirty Day Princess is a 1934 American pre-Code comedy film directed by Marion Gering and starring Sylvia Sidney, Cary Grant and Edward Arnold. The film was based on a story of the same name by Clarence Budington Kelland (which appeared in Ladies' Home Journal in 1933), adapted by Sam Hellman and Edwin Justus Mayer, and written by Preston Sturges and Frank Partos.

== Plot ==
On her way to New York to find financial backing for her impoverished country, the Ruritanian Kingdom of Taronia, Princess "Zizzi" Catterina falls ill with the mumps and has to be quarantined for a month. In desperation, financier Richard Gresham, who is planning to issue $50 million in Taronian bonds, hires unemployed lookalike actress Nancy Lane to impersonate the princess, and offers her a large bonus if she changes the mind of the chief opponent of the financial transaction, newspaper publisher Porter Madison III.

== Cast ==
- Sylvia Sidney as Princess Catterina / Nancy Lane
- Cary Grant as Porter Madison III
- Edward Arnold as Richard Gresham
- Henry Stephenson as King Anatol XII
- Vince Barnett as Count Nicholeus
- Edgar Norton as Baron Passeria
- Ray Walker as Dan Kirk
- Lucien Littlefield as Parker
- Robert McWade as Managing editor
- George Baxter: Donald Spottswood
- Marguerite Namara as Lady-in-Waiting

== Production ==
Production on Thirty Day Princess was to have begun on 28 February 1934, but was delayed because of the illness of William Collier Sr., who was scheduled to play the role of the "Managing editor". Collier was replaced and production began on 1 March.

Although Preston Sturges received a writing credit for the film's screenplay, he wrote in his autobiography that "not much" of his work was actually used. Sturges also said of B.P. Schulberg that "as a producer, [he] was accustomed to accepting praise for pictures as generals accept praise for the valor of their soldiers, and it thus seemed logical to him that the writers should feel the same general sense of shared accomplishment." Thirty-Day Princess was released on 18 May 1934.

== Reception ==
The film received a mixed reception. Meyer Levin of Esquire remarking that the director was "no man for comedy", and Cy Caldwell of New Outlook calling it a "jolly and amusing romantic comedy" in which Grant, Edward Arnold, Vince Barnett and others "render good support". Mordaunt Hall of The New York Times wrote, "This amiable light affair has a generous share of imaginative turns, and it is further endowed with a highly competent supporting cast."

Grant biographer Geoffrey Wansell notes that Grant was "required to do little more than spend most of his time wearing white tie and tails." He states that some of the more scathing reviews of the film "infuriated" Grant and that he subsequently demanded to choose his own roles. Wansell claims that Paramount retaliated by loaning him to United Artists.

== Sources ==
- Deschner, Donald (1973). The Complete Films of Cary Grant. Citadel Press. ISBN 0-8065-0376-9.
- Wansell, Geoffrey (December 13, 2013) [1996]. Cary Grant, Dark Angel. Skyhorse Publishing. ISBN 978-1-62872-336-6.
