= Modern Daughters =

1927 film

- Directed by: Charles J. Hunt
- Written by: J. Stewart Woodhouse
- Produced by: W. Ray Johnston; Trem Carr
- Starring: Edna Murphy; Bryant Washburn; Ernest Hilliard
- Cinematography: Hap Depew
- Production company: Trem Carr Pictures
- Distributed by: Rayart Pictures
- Release date: May 1, 1927
- Running time: 60 minutes; 5,451 feet (1,661 m)
- Country: United States
- Languages: Silent; English intertitles

Modern Daughters is a lost 1927 American silent drama film directed by Charles J. Hunt and starring Edna Murphy, Bryant Washburn and Ernest Hilliard.

== Cast ==
- Edna Murphy
- Bryant Washburn
- Ernest Hilliard
- Virginia Lyons
- J.C. Fowler
- Hazel Flint

== Preservation ==
With no holdings located in archives, Modern Daughters is considered a lost film.

== Bibliography ==
- Munden, Kenneth White. The American Film Institute Catalog of Motion Pictures Produced in the United States, Part 1. University of California Press, 1997.
