= The Gold Racket =

1937 film directed by Louis J. Gasnier

- Theatrical release poster
- Directed by: Louis J. Gasnier
- Screenplay by: David S. Levy
- Story by: Howard Higgin
- Produced by: George Hirliman
- Starring: Conrad Nagel; Eleanor Hunt; Fuzzy Knight; Frank Milan; Jack Duffy; Albert J. Smith
- Cinematography: Mack Stengler
- Edited by: Robert Jahns
- Production company: George A. Hirliman Productions
- Distributed by: Grand National Films Inc.
- Release date: April 10, 1937
- Running time: 66 minutes
- Country: United States
- Language: English

The Gold Racket is a 1937 American crime film directed by Louis J. Gasnier and written by David S. Levy. The film stars Conrad Nagel, Eleanor Hunt, in the third of their "G-Man" film series as well as Fuzzy Knight, Frank Milan, Jack Duffy and Albert J. Smith. The film was released on April 10, 1937, by Grand National Films Inc.

== Plot ==
The story follows Alan and Bobbie as they accept a request from the Mexican Government to stop the operations of a gang that is smuggling gold from México to the U.S and then selling it to the U.S Government.

== Cast ==
- Conrad Nagel as Alan O'Connor
- Eleanor Hunt as Bobbie Reynolds
- Fuzzy Knight as Scotty Summers
- Frank Milan as Steve Williams
- Jack Duffy as Hinkle
- Albert J. Smith as Fraser
- Warner Richmond as Doc Johnson
- Charles Delaney as Joe
- Karl Hackett as Lefty
- William L. Thorne as McKenzie
- Edward LeSaint as Dixon
