= The Warning Signal =

1926 silent film

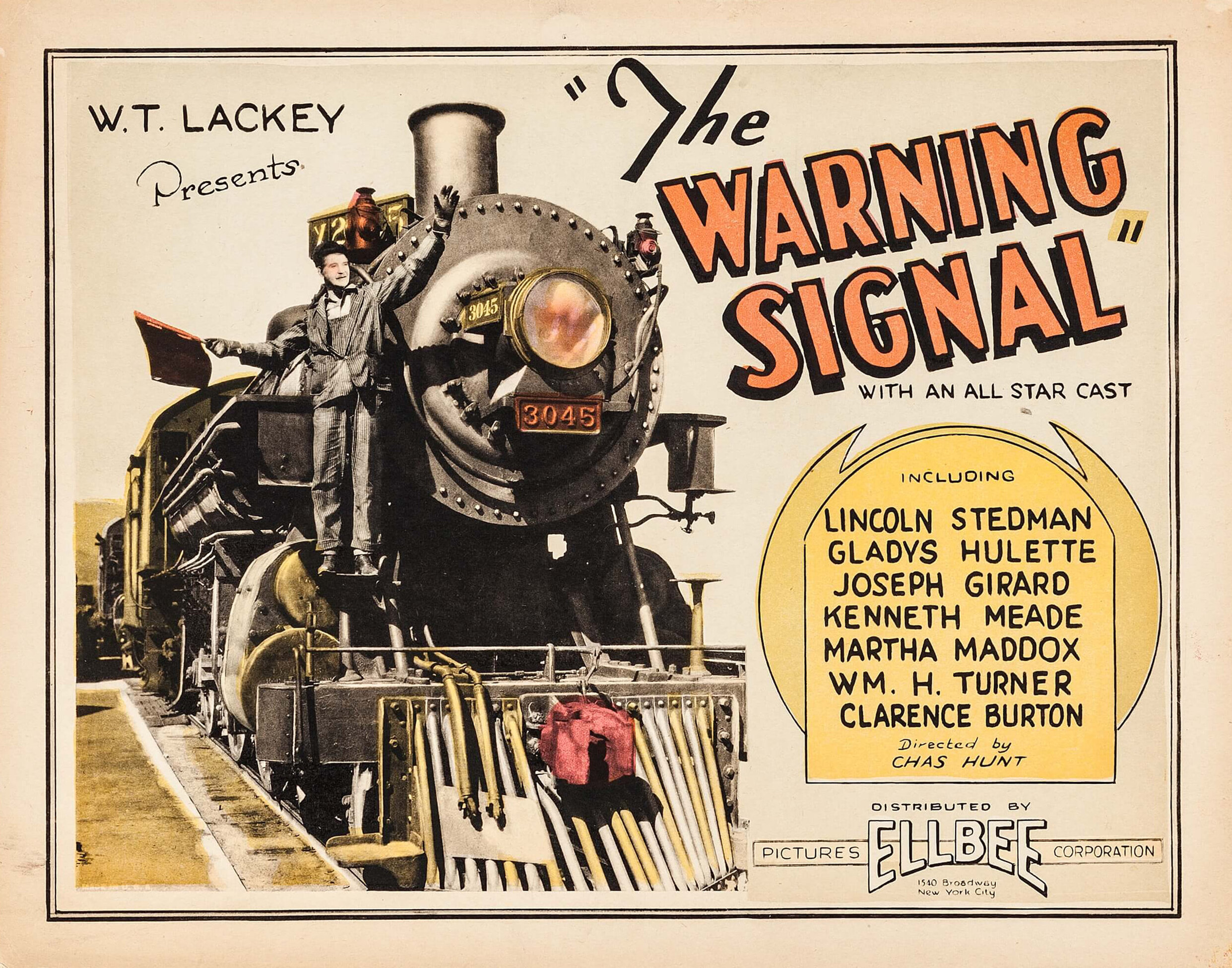
- Directed by: Charles J. Hunt
- Written by: Barry Barringer
- Produced by: William T. Lackey
- Starring: Gladys Hulette; Lincoln Stedman; Clarence Burton
- Cinematography: William H. Tuers
- Production company: W.T. Lackey Productions
- Distributed by: Ellbee Pictures
- Release date: July 14, 1926
- Running time: 50 minutes
- Country: United States
- Languages: Silent; English intertitles

The Warning Signal is a 1926 American silent action drama film directed by Charles J. Hunt and starring Gladys Hulette, Lincoln Stedman and Clarence Burton.

== Synopsis ==
The son of a railroad owner wants to make his own way in the world, and so takes a job with the company under an assumed identity. He battles with a rival and manages to thwart a dangerous collision. At the end he is promoted to president of the railroad by his father.

== Cast ==
- Gladys Hulette
- Kent Mead
- Lincoln Stedman
- Clarence Burton
- Martha Mattox
- William H. Turner
- Joseph W. Girard

== Bibliography ==
- Robert B. Connelly. The Silents: Silent Feature Films, 1910-36, Volume 40, Issue 2. December Press, 1998.
