= Lenita Lane =

American actress (1901–1995)

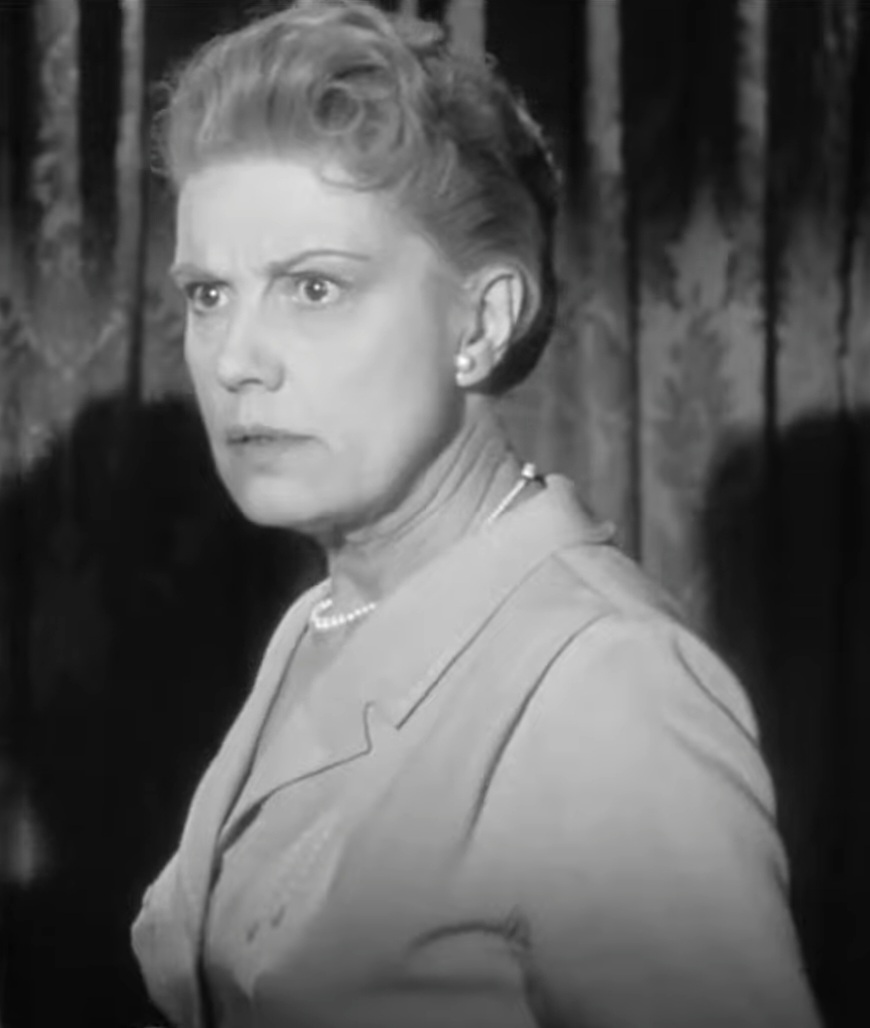
- Lane in The Bat (1959)
- Born: Lenita Mary Lane; December 16, 1901; Parnassus, New Kensington, Pennsylvania, U.S.
- Died: March 15, 1995 (aged 93); Culver City, California, U.S.
- Resting place: Forest Lawn Memorial Park, Hollywood Hills, California
- Occupation: Actress
- Years active: 1931–1959
- Spouse: Crane Wilbur (m. 1936; died 1973)

Lenita Mary Lane (December 16, 1901 – March 15, 1995) was an American stage and film actress. She appeared in several Broadway plays before turning to movies. Her more than two dozen movie appearances include The Mad Magician (1954) and The Bat (1959).

== Personal life ==
Lane was born on December 16, 1901, in Parnassus, Pennsylvania. In April 1936 she married director Crane Wilbur. They remained married until his death in 1973. Lane died in Culver City, California on March 15, 1995, aged 93. She is buried with her husband at Forest Lawn Memorial Park in Hollywood Hills, California.

== Filmography ==
- Murder by the Clock (1931) as Nurse
- Now I'll Tell (1934) as Virginia
- By Your Leave (1934) as Laura
- Imitation of Life (1934) as Mrs. Dale
- I Believed in You (1934) as Novelist
- We're Rich Again (1934) as Charmion
- The Gay Deception (1935) as Peg De Forrest
- Thunder in the Night (1935) as Guest
- Women Must Dress (1935) as Eve Sheldon
- Ginger (1935) as Society woman
- Federal Agent (1936) as Vilma
- A Dangerous Adventure (1937) as Frances Damon
- Girls on Probation (1938) as Marge
- The Women (1939) as Mrs. Spencer's friend
- Girl in 313 (1940) as Mrs. Whitman
- Free, Blonde and 21 (1940) as Mrs. Whitman
- Manhattan Heartbeat (1940) as Bentley's nurse
- I Want a Divorce (1940) as Wanda's friend
- For Beauty's Sake (1941) as Miss Sawter
- Man at Large (1941) as Nurse
- Dead Men Tell (1941) as Dr. Anne Bonney
- Castle in the Desert (1942) as Lucy Manderley
- Home Sweet Homicide (1946) as Mrs. Flora Sanford
- The Devil on Wheels (1947) as Mrs. Clark
- I Was a Communist for the FBI (1951) as Principal
- The Mad Magician (1954) as Alice Prentiss
- The Bat (1959) as Lizzie Allen
