= The Fighting Chance (1920 film) =

1920 film by Charles Maigne

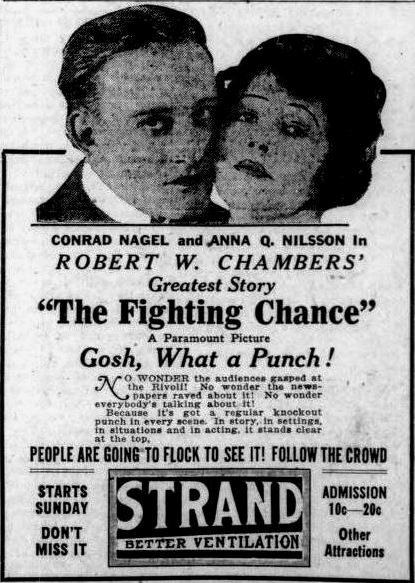
- Newspaper advertisement
- Directed by: Charles Maigne
- Screenplay by: Will M. Ritchey
- Based on: The Fighting Chance by Robert W. Chambers
- Produced by: Jesse L. Lasky
- Starring: Anna Q. Nilsson; Conrad Nagel; Clarence Burton; Dorothy Davenport; Herbert Prior; Ruth Helms
- Cinematography: Faxon M. Dean
- Production companies: Artcraft Pictures Corporation; Famous Players–Lasky Corporation
- Distributed by: Paramount Pictures
- Release date: August 1, 1920
- Running time: 60 minutes
- Country: United States
- Language: Silent (English intertitles)

The Fighting Chance is a surviving 1920 American silent drama film directed by Charles Maigne and written by Will M. Ritchey. It was formerly thought to be lost. The film stars include Anna Q. Nilsson, Conrad Nagel, Clarence Burton, Dorothy Davenport, Herbert Prior, and Ruth Helms. It is based on the 1906 novel The Fighting Chance by Robert W. Chambers. The film was released on August 1, 1920, by Paramount Pictures.

== Cast ==
- Anna Q. Nilsson as Sylvia Landis
- Conrad Nagel as Stephen Siward
- Clarence Burton as Leroy Mortimer
- Dorothy Davenport as Leila Mortimer
- Herbert Prior as Kemp Farrell
- Ruth Helms as Grace Farrell
- Bertram Grassby as Howard Quarrier
- Maude Wayne as Lydia Vyse
- Fred R. Stanton as Beverly Plank
- William H. Brown as Maj. Belwether

== Censorship ==
Before The Fighting Chance could be exhibited in Kansas, the Kansas Board of Review required the removal of a scene where a chorus girl smokes.
