= Montana Bill =

1921 film

- Directed by: Phil Goldstone
- Written by: A. M. Levey
- Produced by: Ben F. Wilson
- Starring: William Fairbanks; Maryon Aye; Robert Kortman
- Cinematography: Edgar Lyons
- Edited by: John English
- Production company: Western Star Productions
- Distributed by: Pioneer Film
- Release date: 1921 (US)
- Running time: 5 reels
- Country: United States
- Languages: Silent; English intertitles

Montana Bill is a 1921 American silent Western film directed by Phil Goldstone from a screenplay by A. M. Levey. The film stars William Fairbanks, Maryon Aye, and Robert Kortman.

== Cast ==
- William Fairbanks as Montana Bill
- Maryon Aye as Ruth
- Robert Kortman
- Jack Waltemeyer
- Ernest Van Pelt
- Hazel Hart
