= On the Stroke of Twelve =

1927 silent film

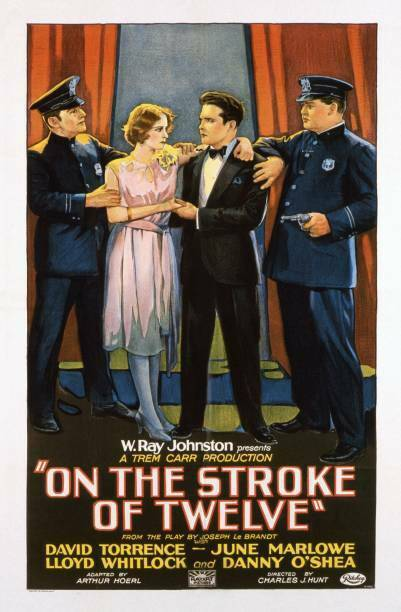
- Directed by: Charles J. Hunt
- Written by: Joseph Le Brandt (play); Arthur Hoerl
- Produced by: Trem Carr; W. Ray Johnston
- Starring: David Torrence; June Marlowe; Lloyd Whitlock
- Cinematography: Hap Depew
- Production company: Trem Carr Pictures
- Distributed by: Rayart Pictures
- Release date: November 1927
- Running time: 60 minutes
- Country: United States
- Languages: Silent; English intertitles

On the Stroke of Twelve is a 1927 American silent drama film directed by Charles J. Hunt and starring David Torrence, June Marlowe and Lloyd Whitlock.

== Cast ==
- David Torrence as Henry Rutledge
- June Marlowe as Doris Bainbridge
- Danny O'Shea as Jack Rutledge
- Lloyd Whitlock as James Horton
- Lillian Worth as Marie Conyers
- Charles West as Charles Wright
- Martin Turner as George

== Bibliography ==
- Robert B. Connelly. The Silents: Silent Feature Films, 1910-36, Volume 40, Issue 2. December Press, 1998.
