= Northern Frontier =

1935 film by Sam Newfield

- Theatrical release poster
- Directed by: Sam Newfield
- Screenplay by: Barry Barringer
- Based on: Four Minutes Late by James Oliver Curwood
- Produced by: Maurice Conn
- Starring: Kermit Maynard; Eleanor Hunt; Russell Hopton; J. Farrell MacDonald; LeRoy Mason; Gertrude Astor; Ben Hendricks Jr. Lloyd Ingraham
- Cinematography: Edgar Lyons
- Edited by: John English
- Production company: Conn Pictures Corporation
- Distributed by: Ambassador Pictures
- Release date: February 1, 1935
- Running time: 57 minutes
- Country: United States
- Language: English

Northern Frontier is a 1935 American adventure film directed by Sam Newfield and written by Barry Barringer. The film stars Kermit Maynard, Eleanor Hunt, Russell Hopton, J. Farrell MacDonald, LeRoy Mason, Gertrude Astor, Ben Hendricks Jr. and Lloyd Ingraham. The film was released on February 1, 1935, by Ambassador Pictures.

== Cast ==
- Kermit Maynard as Mack MacKenzie
- Eleanor Hunt as Beth Braden
- Russell Hopton as Duke Milford
- J. Farrell MacDonald as Inspector McKenzie
- LeRoy Mason as Stone
- Gertrude Astor as Mae
- Ben Hendricks Jr. as Sam Keene
- Walter Brennan as Cook
- Lloyd Ingraham as Prof. Braden
- Nelson McDowell as Barfly Tope
- Lafe McKee as Old Trapper
