= The Mad Magician =

1954 American 3D horror film by John Brahm

- Theatrical release poster
- Directed by: John Brahm
- Written by: Crane Wilbur
- Produced by: Bryan Foy
- Starring: Vincent Price; Mary Murphy; Eva Gabor
- Cinematography: Bert Glennon
- Edited by: Grant Whytock
- Music by: Arthur Lange; Emil Newman
- Production company: Columbia Pictures
- Distributed by: Columbia Pictures
- Release date: April 7, 1954
- Running time: 73 minutes
- Country: United States
- Language: English

The Mad Magician is a 1954 American horror film in 3D, directed by John Brahm starring Vincent Price, Mary Murphy and Eva Gabor. It was produced and distributed by Columbia Pictures, with a release in 3-D to build on the craze started by films such as House of Wax (1953), which also starred Price. In the film, a master illusionist murders his employer after learning he tricked him into signing away ownership of every trick he invents, and finds that to avoid being caught for the murder he must kill again and again.

== Plot ==
Don Gallico is a master of disguise and inventor of stage-magic effects aspiring to become a star magician under the stage name Gallico the Great in the late 19th century. Disguised as The Great Rinaldi, a headlining rival magician, Gallico performs his first magic show, headlined by his latest illusion, The Lady and the Buzz Saw. Businessman Ross Ormond and his lawyer stop the show and serve Gallico a cease and desist order against the performance of the trick. Gallico signed a contract with Ormond's Illusions, Inc., a magician's trick provider, to invent new tricks, granting Ormond ownership of all work created by Gallico, not just the tricks produced for Illusions, Inc., Gallico's understanding.

At Gallico's work area in the Illusions, Inc. warehouse, Ormond and Gallico argue over how Ormond could have stopped Gallico from using the buzz-saw before he launched his show, thus sparing him massive expense and public humiliation, and interrupted the show just to assert his power over Gallico. Gallico also accuses Ormond of corrupting his wife Claire, who is now married to Ormond, to which Ormond says that Claire was always a gold digger. Incensed, Gallico decapitates Ormond for real using the buzz-saw. He puts Ormond's severed head in a bag for disposal. The bag is mistakenly taken by Gallico's assistant Karen Lee when she drops by to meet up with her boyfriend, police detective Lt. Alan Bruce. Lee forgets the bag in a hansom cab, and the cabbie turns it over to police; Gallico allows the police to think the bag is Lee's while telling her that the bag contained a dummy head of her.

Gallico impersonates Ormond to rent an apartment from Alice Prentiss, an author of mystery novels. Prentiss mentions a bonfire celebration of a local sports team's victory. Gallico disguises Ormond's body as a dummy and adds it to the bonfire, but Ormond's skeletal remains are found in the ashes. Searching for her missing husband, Claire learns of the rented apartment. When she confronts Gallico she recognizes him through his disguise and deduces that he murdered Ormond. Gallico strangles her to keep her from exposing him, then flees before Prentiss can arrive in response to Claire's screams.

Since Prentiss confirms Ormond's presence in the room where Claire was killed, and the fingerprints on her throat match other prints Gallico left while impersonating Ormond, police conclude Ormond is the killer. However, Rinaldi hints to them that they cannot be sure the prints they used for the match are really Ormond's. Gallico invites the Prentisses to a preview performance of his new illusion, The Crematorium, in which he appears to be incinerated in a fiery furnace, purpose-built for the illusion. Afterwards, the Great Rinaldi tells Gallico he has deduced that he murdered Claire while using a mask to impersonate Ormond, and blackmails him in exchange for the use of all Gallico's future illusions in his act. Gallico murders Rinaldi and incinerates his remains in the furnace. To disguise the time of Rinaldi's disappearance, he impersonates Rinaldi and takes over his tour. Troubled by Rinaldi's remark about the fingerprints, Bruce tries to get his fingerprints of other persons of interest, but Gallico in the guise of Rinaldi refuses.

Mulling over the scene of the crime and subconsciously recognized similarities between Gallico and "Ormond", Prentiss realizes that Gallico was impersonating Ormand and communicates her theory to Bruce. Bruce and Prentiss break into Gallico's work space to obtain his fingerprints. Gallico returns before they can leave, knocks Bruce out, and prepares to burn him to death in the furnace. Prentiss calls out to Lee on the street below for help. Lee pounds on the door, distracting Gallico long enough for Prentiss to free Bruce from his bonds. Gallico attacks Bruce, and Bruce inadvertently knocks him into the furnace, where he is incinerated.

== Cast ==
Actor	Role
Vincent Price	Don Gallico / Gallico the Great
Mary Murphy	Karen Lee
Eva Gabor	Claire Ormond
John Emery	The Great Rinaldi
Donald Randolph	Ross Ormond
Lenita Lane	Alice Prentiss
Patrick O'Neal	Police Detective Lt. Alan Bruce
Jay Novello	Frank Prentiss
Corey Allen	Gus the Stagehand (uncredited)
Lyle Talbot	Disguised program hawker (uncredited)
Tom Powers	Police inspector (uncredited)

== Reception ==
Dennis Schwartz from Dennis Schwartz Movie Reviews awarded the film a grade B, writing "It was cheesy fun with a delightfully villainous Vincent, but the whole act was too tawdry and incredible to be swallowed whole and the melodramatic plot points were too contrived and the demented scenario too hokey." On his website Fantastic Movie Musings and Ramblings, Dave Sindelar gave the film a negative review. Sindelar stated that the film felt cobbled together, and lacked the mood and ambiance of its predecessor, House of Wax. TV Guide gave the film 2/5 stars, calling it "vastly inferior 3-D rip-off of Price's surprisingly successful 3-D shocker HOUSE OF WAX". Jay Seaver from eFilmCritic awarded the film an average rating of 3/5 stars, calling its scenario "straight-facedly silly", but stated that it was still entertaining even though it was inferior to its predecessor.
