= Edgar Lyons =

American cinematographer (1894–1950)

- Born: May 19, 1894; Brooklyn, New York, United States
- Died: April 4, 1950 (aged 55); Hollywood, California, United States
- Occupation: Cinematographer
- Years active: 1921-1946

Edgar Lyons was an American cinematographer, his first credit was the silent film Montana Bill in 1921.

== Filmography ==
All as cinematographer, unless otherwise noted, as Per AFI database.

- Montana Bill (1921)
- Smiling Jim (1922)
- A Western Demon (1922)
- The Firebrand (1922)
- The Torrent (1924)
- Soiled (1924) Additional photography
- The Virgin (1924)
- Do It Now (1924)
- The Reckless Sex (1925) Additional photography
- Three Wise Goofs (1925) (short)
- Hold Tight (1925) (short)
- Danger Ahead (1926) (short)
- The Fighting Trooper (1934)
- The Singing Vagabond (1935)
- Wilderness Mail (1935)
- The Code of the Mounted (1935)
- Racing Luck (1935)
- Northern Frontier (1935)
- The Big Show (1936)
- The Singing Cowboy (1936)
- Go-Get-'Em-Haines (1936)
- The Old Corral (1936)
- Death Valley Outlaws (1941)
- Shadows on the Sage (1942)
- Stagecoach to Denver (1946)
- The El Paso Kid (1946)
