= Charles J. Hunt =

American film editor and director

- Born: April 8, 1881; Fort Lee, New Jersey, U.S.
- Died: February 3, 1976 (aged 94); Los Angeles, California, U.S.
- Occupations: Director, producer, editor, actor
- Years active: 1912–1961

Charles J. Hunt (April 8, 1881 – February 3, 1976) was an American film editor and director. He also worked at various times as an actor, production manager and associate producer.

== Selected filmography ==
- The Fate of a Flirt (1925)
- Speed Mad (1925)
- The Smoke Eaters (1926)
- The Dixie Flyer (1926)
- The Warning Signal (1926)
- Modern Daughters (1927)
- The Show Girl (1927)
- On the Stroke of Twelve (1927)
- The Midnight Watch (1927)
- South of Panama (1928)
- Queen of the Chorus (1928)
- Thundergod (1928)
- Smoke Bellew (1929)
- Just Like Heaven (1930)
- Rider of the Plains (1931)
- Riders of the North (1931)
- Police Court (1932)
- Trailing the Killer (1932)
- Law of the West (1932)
- The Devil on Horseback (1936)
- We're in the Legion Now! (1936)
- Go-Get-'Em, Haines (1936)
- Captain Calamity (1936)

== Bibliography ==
- Munden, Kenneth White. The American Film Institute Catalog of Motion Pictures Produced in the United States, Part 1. University of California Press, 1997.
