= Great Guy =

1936 film by John G. Blystone

- Directed by: John G. Blystone
- Written by: Henry Ruskin (additional dialogue)
- Screenplay by: Henry McCarty; Henry Johnson
- Story by: James Edward Grant ("The Johnnie Cave Stories")
- Produced by: Douglas MacLean
- Starring: James Cagney
- Cinematography: Jack MacKenzie
- Edited by: Russell F. Schoemgarth
- Production company: Zion Meyers Productions
- Distributed by: Grand National Pictures
- Release date: December 1936
- Running time: 66 minutes
- Country: United States
- Language: English

Great Guy is a 1936 American crime film noir directed by John G. Blystone and starring James Cagney. In the film, an honest inspector for the New York Department of Weights and Measures takes on corrupt merchants and politicians.

== Plot ==
After the Chief Deputy of the Department of Weights and Measures is nearly killed in a car accident engineered by corrupt politician Marty Cavanaugh, he enlists ex-boxer Johnny Cave to take over his position. Johnny learns from Joe Green, the chief deputy, that there are men who are higher up in the organization than Marty. As the new leader, Johnny reiterates to his team the importance of their department and warns them that corruption is an ongoing hazard.

Johnny then goes out into the field with his naive partner, Patrick James "Aloysius" Haley, investigating merchants who are accused of using faulty measures and cheating the public. He ends up fining a market for adding lead weights to stewing chickens and fining a gas station for routinely shortchanging its customers. In each case, the merchants try to bribe Johnny in exchange for ignoring their corrupt practices, but he adamantly refuses. Meanwhile, Johnny's fiancée, Janet Henry, criticizes him for being constantly hardheaded in his indefatigable pursuit of fighting corruption.

Later on, Cavanaugh offers Johnny a cushy job with his organization in exchange for turning a blind eye to his citywide racket. After he refuses, Johnny is framed for both drunk driving and a robbery, but is then "exonerated" by an ornery Cavanaugh, implying that he can make or break him. Afterwards, the mayor, a puppet for Cavanaugh, offers Johnny a high paying job, but once again he refuses.

When Johnny learns that Janet's boss, Abel Canning, has been swindling a local orphanage by sending them half-shipments of food but charging them full-price, he declares that he's going to expose him for the criminal that he is. Once he realizes that Canning is in an alliance with both the mayor and Cavanaugh, Johnny releases the orphanage story to the newspapers, which angers his fiancée and eventually leads to her breaking their engagement.

As Johnny prepares for the case against Canning, Cavanaugh hires a thug, ex-wrestler Joe Burton, to attack and steal the evidence from him. However, instead of turning over the evidence to Canning, Burton decides to blackmail him for $5,000. While at a big cocktail party, Canning gives Burton a $5,000 check in exchange for a key to his apartment where the evidence is hid. After Johnny notices Canning at the party with a skeleton key, he spots Burton exiting a side room. Johnny goes over to Burton and punches him in the face, then removes what he thinks is the stolen evidence from his jacket pocket, but instead discovers a check written by Canning. He then realizes that Canning is on his way to retrieve the evidence in Burton's apartment.

Meanwhile, at the apartment, Canning and Cavanaugh locate the evidence hidden behind some wallpaper in a closet. They are about to burn the papers when Johnny arrives just in time, preventing them from destroying the evidence. Then, thanks to a tip by Janet, the police arrive moments later and arrest the two men. Later on, with Johnny and Janet's engagement back on, he presents her with a ring that he got on the "installment plan," even though he knows it's a racket.

== Cast ==
Great Guy (1936)

- James Cagney as Johnny Cave
- Mae Clarke as Janet Henry
- James Burke as Patrick James Aloysius Haley
- Edward Brophy as Pete Reilly
- Henry Kolker as Abel Canning
- Bernadene Hayes as Hazel Scott
- Edward McNamara as Captain Pat Hanlon
- Robert Gleckler as Marty Cavanaugh
- Joe Sawyer as Joe Burton
- Edward Gargan as Al
- Matty Fain as Tin
- Mary Gordon as Mrs. Ogilvie
- Wallis Clark as Joel Green
- Douglas Wood as Mayor
- Jason Ismael Lopez as Officer Carrey

== Background ==
Great Guy was the first of two films James Cagney made for independent film company Grand National Pictures, after he successfully broke his contract with Warner Brothers. After completing his second film, the musical Something to Sing About (which was not a financial success), Cagney returned to Warners.

The technical adviser for the film was Charles M. Fuller, who was the Los Angeles County Sealer of Weights and Measures. The story was based on several written pieces that appeared in The Saturday Evening Post in 1933 and 1934, written by James Edward Grant. Early press releases for Great Guy list Henry McCarty, Harry Ruskin and Horace McCoy as contributing writers for the film, but later on, McCoy was dropped from credits, and Henry Johnson was added as a co-writer.

== Reception ==
Writing for The Spectator in 1937, Graham Greene gave the film a good review, praising Cagney as an actor who "seldom disappoints", and whose performance in this film provides "more sophisticated humour than usual". According to Greene, "the scenes with the ward politicians, the Mayor, the philanthropist, crooks all, are pleasantly phosphorescent with corruption, and so is the admirable climax at the evening party".

== See also ==
- Public domain film
- List of American films of 1937
- List of films in the public domain in the United States
