= Eleanor Hunt =

American actress (1910–1981)

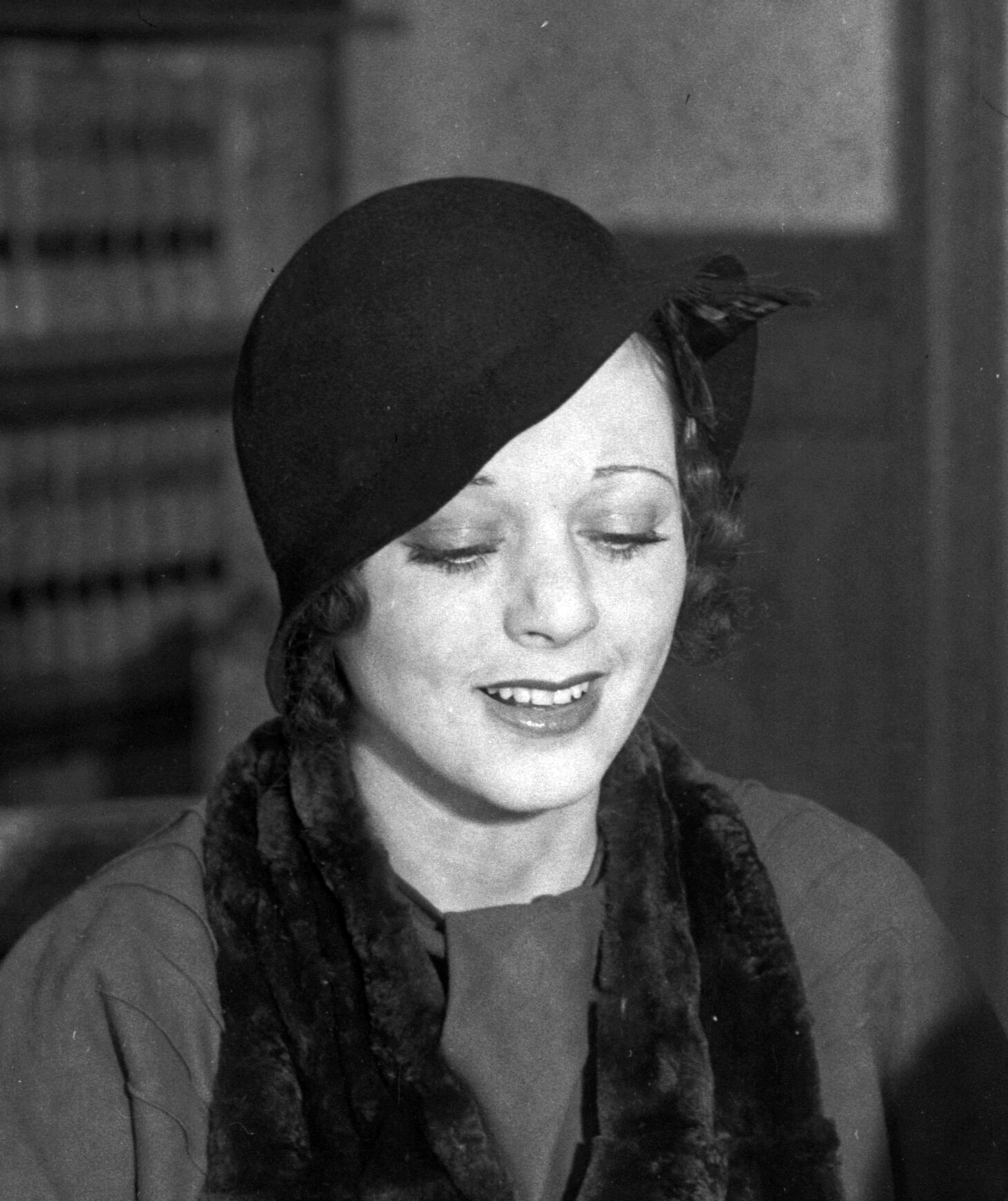
- Hunt in 1932
- Born: January 10, 1910; New York City, U.S.
- Died: June 12, 1981 (aged 71); Queens, New York City, U.S.
- Occupation: Actress
- Years active: 1930–1941
- Spouses: Rex Lease (m. 1931; div. 19??); Dr. Frank G. Nolan (m. 1933; div. 1935) George Hirliman: (m. 19??)
- Children: Georgelle Hirliman; Kathy Hirliman

Eleanor Hunt (January 10, 1910 – June 12, 1981) was an American film actress. She starred opposite John Wayne in the 1934 film Blue Steel.

== Personal life ==
She was married to actor Rex Lease for "a few months" before their September 1931 divorce and to Dr. Frank G. Nolan from November 1933 until June 14, 1935. She later married George Hirliman, with whom she adopted a daughter, Georgelle, as an infant, and with who she later had a daughter, Kathy.

== Filmography ==
Year	Title	Role	Notes
1930	Whoopee!	Sally Morgan	
1931	Goldie	Russian Girl	
1931	Good Sport	Party Girl	
1932	Tess of the Storm Country	One of the Longman Sisters	Uncredited
1934	I Hate Women	Tillie	
1934	Blue Steel	Betty Mason	
1934	Wake Up and Dream	Chorus Girl	Uncredited
1934	The Merry Widow	Maxim Girl	Uncredited
1935	Northern Frontier	Beth Braden	
1936	Go-Get-'Em, Haines	Gloria Palmer	
1936	Yellow Cargo	Bobbie Reynolds	
1936	We're in the Legion Now!	Honey Evans	
1937	Navy Spy	Bobbie Reynolds	
1937	The Gold Racket	Bobbie Reynolds	
1937	Bank Alarm	Bobbie Reynolds	
1940	Stolen Paradise	Patricia Morrow	
