= The Devil on Horseback =

1936 film directed by Crane Wilbur

- Directed by: Crane Wilbur
- Written by: Crane Wilbur (play)
- Produced by: George A. Hirliman; Charles J. Hunt; Louis Rantz
- Starring: Lili Damita; Fred Keating; Renee Torres
- Cinematography: Mack Stengler
- Edited by: Ralph Dixon
- Music by: Abe Meyer; Hugo Riesenfeld
- Production company: George A. Hirliman Productions
- Distributed by: Grand National
- Release date: September 30, 1936
- Running time: 70 minutes
- Country: United States
- Language: English

The Devil on Horseback is a 1936 American musical comedy film directed by Crane Wilbur and starring Lili Damita, Fred Keating, and Renee Torres. A separate Spanish-language version was also produced. It was based on a play written by Crane Wilber himself about a Latin American freedom fighter.

It was shot using the Cinecolor process.

== Cast ==
- Lili Damita as Diane Corday
- Fred Keating as Gary Owen
- Francisco Flores del Campo as Pancho Granero
- Jean Chatburn as Jane Evans
- Tiffany Thayer as Wilbur Hitchcock
- Renee Torres as Rosmond
- Juan Torena as Juan Torres
- Blanca Vischer as Manuela Torres
- Enrique de Rosas as Col. Enrique Berea
- Jack Stegall as Capt. de Reana

== Bibliography ==
- Waldman, Harry & Slide, Anthony. Hollywood and the Foreign Touch: A Dictionary of Foreign Filmmakers and Their Films from America, 1910-1995. Scarecrow Press, 1996.
