= Navy Spy =

1937 film by Joseph H. Lewis

- Directed by: Joseph H. Lewis; Crane Wilbur
- Written by: Crane Wilbur
- Produced by: Samuel Diege; George A. Hirliman; Louis Rantz
- Starring: Conrad Nagel; Eleanor Hunt; Judith Allen
- Cinematography: Mack Stengler
- Edited by: Tony Martinelli
- Music by: Abe Meyer
- Production company: George A. Hirliman Productions
- Distributed by: Grand National Pictures
- Release date: March 13, 1937
- Running time: 72 minutes
- Country: United States
- Language: English

Navy Spy is a 1937 American thriller film directed by Joseph H. Lewis and Crane Wilbur and starring Conrad Nagel, Eleanor Hunt and Judith Allen. It was one of a series of four films featuring Nagel as a federal agent released by Grand National Pictures.

== Plot ==
A federal agent tackles a gang of international criminals attempting to sabotage the American navy.

== Cast ==
- Conrad Nagel as Alan O'Connor
- Eleanor Hunt as Bobbie Reynolds
- Judith Allen as Anna Novna
- Jack Doyle as Lt. Don Carrington
- Phil Dunham as Dr. Matthews
- Don Barclay as Bertie
- Howard Lang as Barradine
- Crauford Kent as Capt. Leeds

== Bibliography ==
- Backer, Ron. Mystery Movie Series of 1930s Hollywood. McFarland, 2012.
