= Panamint's Bad Man =

1938 film by Ray Taylor

- Theatrical release poster
- Directed by: Ray Taylor
- Screenplay by: Luci Ward; Charles Arthur Powell
- Story by: Edmond Kelso; Lindsley Parsons
- Produced by: Sol Lesser
- Starring: Smith Ballew; Evelyn Daw; Noah Beery, Sr. Stanley Fields; Harry Woods; Pat J. O'Brien
- Cinematography: Allen Q. Thompson
- Edited by: Albert Jordan
- Production company: 20th Century Fox
- Distributed by: 20th Century Fox
- Release date: July 8, 1938
- Running time: 60 minutes
- Country: United States
- Language: English

Panamint's Bad Man is a 1938 American Western film directed by Ray Taylor and written by Luci Ward and Charles Arthur Powell. The film stars Smith Ballew, Evelyn Daw, Noah Beery, Sr., Stanley Fields, Harry Woods and Pat J. O'Brien. The film was released on July 8, 1938, by 20th Century Fox.

== Plot ==
Larry Kimball disguises himself as an outlaw after receiving an assignment to go to Panamint and capture a gang of outlaws led by King Gorman.

== Cast ==
- Smith Ballew as Larry Kimball
- Evelyn Daw as Joan DeLysa
- Noah Beery, Sr. as King Gorman
- Stanley Fields as Harold 'Black Jack' Deavers
- Harry Woods as Craven
- Pat J. O'Brien as Adams
- Armand 'Curly' Wright as Enrico Nicola
