= Georgelle Hirliman =

American writer (1936–2010)

- Born: June 11, 1936; Los Angeles, California
- Died: January 29, 2010 (aged 73); Santa Fe, New Mexico
- Occupation: Writer

Georgelle Cynthia Hirliman (June 11, 1936, in Los Angeles, California – January 29, 2010, in Santa Fe, New Mexico) was an American writer and the daughter of actress Eleanor Hunt.

She was well-known for her Writer in the Window question and answer series that began in 1984. In 1992, she published a volume of the questions asked, and her answers, in Dear Writer in the Window: The Wit and Wisdom of a Sidewalk Sage. She later transformed the book into a solo-stage play.

Georgelle Hirliman also wrote The Hate Factory: A First-Hand Account of the 1980 Riot at the Penitentiary of New Mexico, which was first published January 1, 1985.

She died at age 73 in 2010 in Santa Fe, New Mexico.
