= The Dixie Flyer =

1926 film

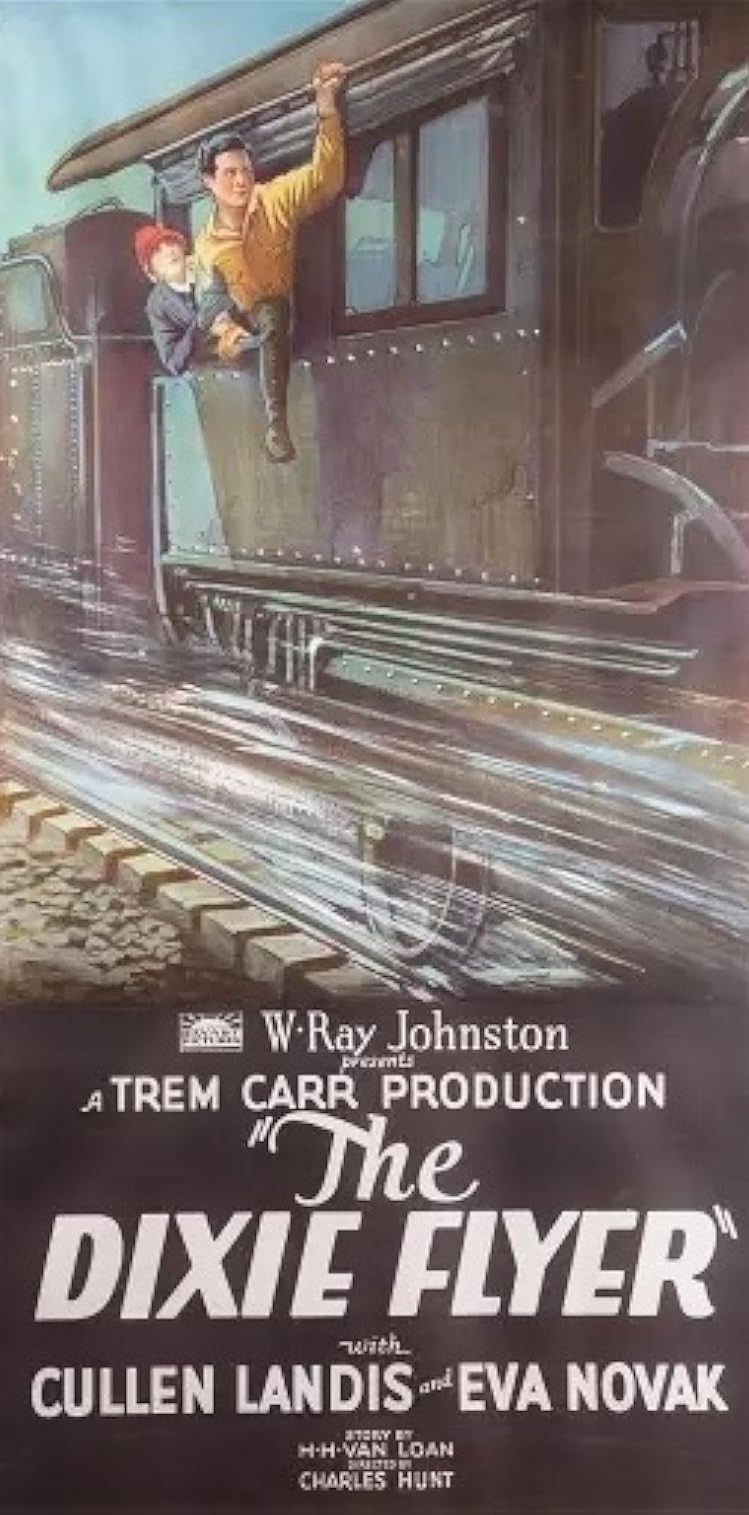
- Directed by: Charles J. Hunt
- Written by: H. H. Van Loan
- Produced by: Trem Carr
- Starring: Cullen Landis; Eva Novak; Ferdinand Munier
- Cinematography: William H. Tuers; Joseph Walker
- Production company: Trem Carr Pictures
- Distributed by: Rayart Pictures
- Release date: July 29, 1926
- Running time: 60 minutes (5,608ft)
- Country: United States
- Languages: Silent; English intertitles

The Dixie Flyer is a 1926 American silent action film directed by Charles J. Hunt and starring Cullen Landis, Eva Novak and Ferdinand Munier.

== Cast ==
- Cullen Landis as 'Sunrise' Smith
- Eva Novak as Rose Rapley / Rose Jones
- Ferdinand Munier as President John J. Rapley
- John Elliott as Vice-president Arthur Bedford
- Art Rowlands as Tom Bedford
- Pat Harmon as Chief Clerk J. K. Burke
- Frank Davis as Mike Clancy
- Mary Gordon as Mrs. Clancy

== Reception ==
The Film Daily reviewed the film, calling it a "melodrama" with "all the old reliable hokum," criticizing it for a lack of originality. However, the reviewer felt that the film would find an audience with people who wanted "action and thrills."

In Movie Age, S.M. White wrote the film was "As full of thrills as a serial. Will stand them up in their seats."

== Bibliography ==
- James Monaco. The Encyclopedia of Film. Perigee Books, 1991.
