= Conrad Nagel =

American actor (1897–1970)

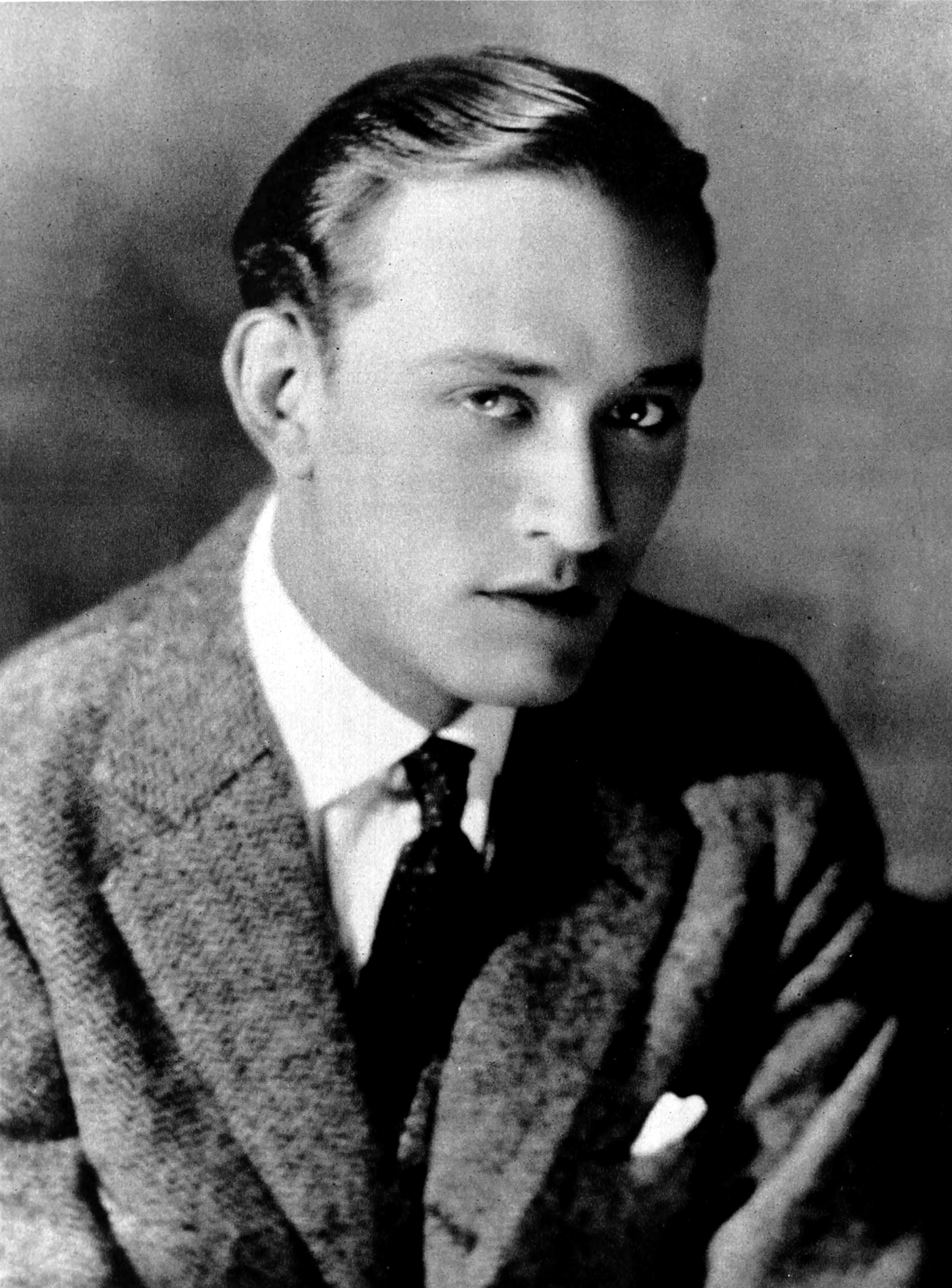
- Nagel in 1922
- Born: John Conrad Nagel; March 16, 1897; Keokuk, Iowa, U.S.
- Died: February 24, 1970 (aged 72); New York City, New York, U.S.
- Resting place: Garden State Crematory
- Education: Des Moines College; Highland Park College
- Occupation: Actor
- Years active: 1918–1967

John Conrad Nagel (March 16, 1897 – February 24, 1970) was an American film, stage, television and radio actor. He was considered a famous matinée idol and leading man of the 1920s and 1930s. He was given an Honorary Academy Award in 1940, and three stars on the Hollywood Walk of Fame in 1960.

== Early life ==
Nagel was born in Keokuk, Iowa. After graduating from Highland Park College, Nagel left for California to pursue a career in the relatively new medium of motion pictures. He began acting in plays at Neely Dickson's Hollywood Community Theater.

== Film career ==
Nagel was immediately cast in film roles that cemented his unspoiled lover image. His first film was the 1918 retelling of Little Women, which quickly captured the public's attention and set Nagel on a path to silent film stardom. His breakout role came in the 1920 film, The Fighting Chance, opposite Swedish starlet Anna Q. Nilsson. In 1918, Nagel was elected to The Lambs, the theatrical club.

In 1927, Nagel starred alongside Lon Chaney Sr., Marceline Day, Henry B. Walthall and Polly Moran in the now lost Tod Browning directed horror film, London After Midnight. Unlike many other silent films stars, Nagel had little difficulty transitioning to sound films. His baritone voice was judged to be perfect for sound, so he appeared in about thirty films in only two years. He described the time as a "great adventure." He was working so steadily that one night when he and his wife planned to go to the movies, he was in films playing at Grauman's, Loew's, and Paramount's theaters. "We couldn't find a theater where I wasn't playing. So we'd go back home. I was an epidemic." He spent the next several decades being very well received in high-profile films as a character actor. He was also frequently heard on radio and made many notable appearances on television.

=== The Academy and SAG ===
On May 11, 1927, Nagel was among 35 other film industry insiders to found the Academy of Motion Picture Arts and Sciences (AMPAS); a professional honorary organization dedicated to the advancement of the arts and sciences of motion pictures. Fellow actors involved in the founding included: Mary Pickford, Douglas Fairbanks, Richard Barthelmess, Jack Holt, Milton Sills, and Harold Lloyd. He served as president of the organization from 1932 to 1933.

== Radio and television ==
Nagel was the announcer for Alec Templeton Time, a musical variety program on NBC Radio in the summer of 1939. He was the host on Silver Theatre, a summer replacement program that began June 8, 1937.

From 1937 to 1947, he hosted and directed the radio program Silver Theater. He then hosted the TV game show Celebrity Time from 1948 to 1952 and the DuMont Television Network program Broadway to Hollywood from 1953 to 1954.

From September 14, 1955, to June 1, 1956, Nagel hosted Hollywood Preview, a 30-minute show on the DuMont Television Network which featured Hollywood stars with clips of upcoming films.

On April 22, 1961, again on television but in an acting role, he made a guest appearance on the popular courtroom drama Perry Mason, portraying the character Nathan Claver, an art collector and murderer, in the episode "The Case of the Torrid Tapestry".

On May 19, 1962 he guest-starred on the TV Western Gunsmoke as the vengeful Major Emerson Owen in S7E33's “The Prisoner”.

In 1963, again on television in an acting role, for Car 54, Where Are You?, "Here We Go Again" he made a guest appearance, as "Himself".

== Personal life ==
Nagel married and divorced three times. His first wife, actress Ruth Helms, gave birth to a daughter, Ruth Margaret, in 1920. His second wife was actress Lynn Merrick. His third wife was Michael Coulson Smith, who gave birth to a son Michael.

Nagel died in 1970 in New York City at the age of 72. A spokesman for the office of the Chief Medical Examiner said that Nagel's death was "due to natural causes", more specifically, a heart attack and emphysema. He added that no autopsy was planned.

== Awards and honors ==
In 1940, Nagel was given an Honorary Academy Award for his work with the Motion Picture Relief Fund.

For his contributions to film, radio, and television, Nagel was given three stars on the Hollywood Walk of Fame at 1719 Vine Street (motion pictures), 1752 Vine Street (radio), and 1752 Vine Street (television).

== Filmography ==
=== Silent ===
- Little Women (1918) as Laurie Laurence
- The Lion and the Mouse (1919) as Jefferson Ryder
- Redhead (1919) as Matthew Thurlow
- Romeo's Dad (1919, Short)
- The Fighting Chance (1920) as Stephen Siward
- Unseen Forces (1920) as Clyde Brunton
- Midsummer Madness (1921) as Julian Osborne
- Forbidden Fruit (1921) as Actor in play 'Forbidden Fruit' (uncredited)
- What Every Woman Knows (1921) as John Shand
- The Lost Romance (1921) as Allen Erskine, M.D
- Sacred and Profane Love (1921) as Emilie Diaz, a pianist
- Fool's Paradise (1921) as Arthur Phelps
- Saturday Night (1922) as Richard Prentiss
- Hate (1922) as Dick Talbot
- The Ordeal (1922) as Dr. Robert Acton
- Nice People (1922) as Scotty White
- The Impossible Mrs. Bellew (1922) as John Helstan
- Singed Wings (1922) as Peter Gordon
- Grumpy (1923) as Ernest Heron
- Bella Donna (1923) as Nigel Armine
- Lawful Larceny (1923) as Andrew Dorsey
- The Rendezvous (1923) as Walter Stanford
- Name the Man (1924) as Victor Stowell
- Three Weeks (1924) as Paul Verdayne
- The Rejected Woman (1924) as John Leslie
- Tess of the d'Urbervilles (1924) as Angel Clare
- Sinners in Silk (1924) as Brock Farley
- Married Flirts (1924) as Perley Rex
- The Snob (1924) as Herrick Appleton
- So This Is Marriage (1924) as Peter Marsh
- Excuse Me (1925) as Harry Mallory
- Cheaper to Marry (1925) as Dick Tyler
- Pretty Ladies (1925) as Maggie's Dream Lover
- Sun-Up (1925) as Rufe
- Lights of Old Broadway (1925) as Dirk de Rhonde
- The Only Thing (1925) as Harry Vane - the Duke of Chevenix
- Dance Madness (1926) as Roger Halladay
- Memory Lane (1926) as Jimmy Holt
- The Exquisite Sinner (1926) as Dominique Prad
- The Waning Sex (1926) as Philip Barry
- There You Are! (1926) as George Fenwick
- Tin Hats (1926) as Jack Benson
- Heaven on Earth (1927) as Edmond Durand
- Slightly Used (1927) as Major John Smith
- Quality Street (1927) as Dr. Valentine Brown
- The Girl from Chicago (1927) as Handsome Joe
- London After Midnight (1927) as Arthur Hibbs
- If I Were Single (1927) as Ted Howard
- Tenderloin (1928) as Chuck White
- The Crimson City (1928) as Ralph Blake
- Glorious Betsy (1928) as Jérôme Bonaparte
- Diamond Handcuffs (1928) as John
- The Michigan Kid (1928) as Michigan Kid / Jim Rowen
- The Mysterious Lady (1928) as Karl von Raden
- The Kiss (1929) as André

=== Sound ===
- Caught in the Fog (1928) as Bob Vickers
- State Street Sadie (1928) as Ralph Blake
- The Terror (1928) as Narrator of Spoken Credit Titles (uncredited)
- Red Wine (1928) as Charles H. Cook
- The Redeeming Sin (1929) as Dr. Raoul de Boise
- Kid Gloves (1929) as Kid Gloves
- The Idle Rich (1929) as William van Luyn
- The Thirteenth Chair (1929) as Richard Crosby
- The Hollywood Revue of 1929 (1929) as Himself - Master of Ceremonies
- The Sacred Flame (1929) as Col. Maurice Taylor
- Dynamite (1929) as Roger Towne
- The Ship from Shanghai (1930) as Howard Vazey
- Second Wife (1930) as Walter Fairchild
- Redemption (1930) as Victor Karenin
- The Divorcee (1930) as Paul
- One Romantic Night (1930) as Dr. Nicholas Haller
- Numbered Men (1930) as 26521
- A Lady Surrenders (1930) as Winthrop Beauvel
- Du Barry, Woman of Passion (1930) as Cosse de Brissac
- Today (1930) as Fred Warner
- Free Love (1930) as Stephen Ferrier
- The Right of Way (1931) as Charley 'Beauty' Steele
- East Lynne (1931) as Robert Carlyle
- Bad Sister (1931) as Dr. Dick Lindley
- Three Who Loved (1931) as John Hanson
- Son of India (1931) as William Darsay
- The Reckless Hour (1931) as Edward 'Eddie' Adams
- The Pagan Lady (1931) as Ernest Todd
- Hell Divers (1931) as Lieutenant D.W. "Duke" Johnson
- The Man Called Back (1932) as Dr. David Yorke
- Divorce in the Family (1932) as Dr. Shumaker
- Kongo (1932) as Kingsland
- Fast Life (1932) as Burton
- The Constant Woman (1933) as Walt Underwood
- Ann Vickers (1933) as Lindsey Atwell
- Dangerous Corner (1934) as Robert Chatfield
- The Marines Are Coming (1934) as Capt. Edward 'Ned' Benton
- One Hour Late (1934) as Stephen Barclay
- Death Flies East (1935) as John Robinson Gordon
- One New York Night (1935) as Kent
- Ball at Savoy (1936) as John Egan, posing as Baron Dupont
- The Girl from Mandalay (1936) as John Foster
- Wedding Present (1936) as Roger Dodacker
- Yellow Cargo (1936) as Alan O'Connor
- Navy Spy (1937) as Alan O'Connor
- The Gold Racket (1937) as Alan O'Connor
- Bank Alarm (1937) as Alan O'Connor
- The Mad Empress (1939) as Maximilian
- One Million B.C. (1940) as Narrator
- I Want a Divorce (1940) as David Holland, Sr.
- Forever Yours (1945) as Dr. Randall
- Eighteenth Century Life in Williamsburg, Virginia (1944) as Narrator
- The Adventures of Rusty (1945) as Hugh Mitchell
- Stage Struck (1948) as Police Lt. Williams
- The Vicious Circle (1948) as Karl Nemesch
- All That Heaven Allows (1955) as Harvey
- Hidden Fear (1957) as Arthur Miller
- A Stranger in My Arms (1959) as Harley Beasley
- The Man Who Understood Women (1959) as G.K. Brody

== In popular culture ==
In the M*A*S*H episode "Abyssinia, Henry" – which featured McLean Stevenson's final appearance on the show – Lt. Col. Blake finds out that his mother-in-law used his brown double-breasted suit to attend a costume party dressed as Conrad Nagel.

== Radio appearances ==
Year	Program	Episode/source
1953	Theater of Life	Three Miracles

Non-profit organization positions
Preceded by M. C. Levee	President of the Academy of Motion Picture Arts and Sciences; 1932–1933	Succeeded by J. Theodore Reed
