= Crane Wilbur =

American actor, film writer, director (1886–1973)

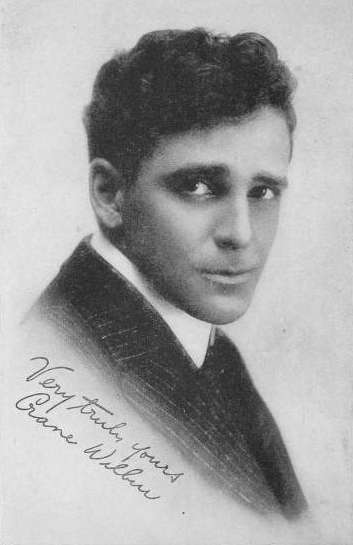
- Born: Irwin Crane Wilbur; November 17, 1886; Athens, New York, U.S.
- Died: October 18, 1973 (aged 86); Toluca Lake, California, U.S.
- Other name: Irwin Crane
- Occupations: Actor; writer; director
- Years active: 1915–1962
- Spouse(s): Edna Hermance (?–1914; divorced); Florence Dunbar Williams (1917–1921; divorced); Suzanne Caubet (1922–1928; divorced); Beatrice Blinn (1928–1933; divorced); Lenita Lane (1936–1973; his death)
- Relatives: Tyrone Power, Sr. (uncle); Tyrone Power (cousin)

Crane Wilbur (November 17, 1886 – October 18, 1973) was an American writer, actor and director for stage, radio and screen. He was born in Athens, New York. Wilbur portrayed Harry Marvin in The Perils of Pauline. He died in Toluca Lake, California. He directed partriotic shorts as well as edgy noir and exploitation films.

He was a prolific writer and director of more than 60 films from the silent era into the sound era. However, it was as an actor that he found lasting recognition, particularly playing opposite Pearl White in the serial The Perils of Pauline.

== Life and career ==
He was born Irwin Wilbur on November 17, 1886, in Athens, New York. His father was a shipbuilder who committed suicide while Crane was a young man. Wilbur was a nephew of actor Tyrone Power, Sr., thereby making him a cousin of Tyrone Power.

In an article in the October 1915 issue of Motion Picture Magazine, Wilbur recalled, "My life hasn't been a path of roses, nor always the straight and narrow road. It has been mostly uphill, rocky climbing, with many a slip and stumble, a few falls and several scars to tell the tale." He added, "I have become what I am and have gained what I have by hard work. My preparatory school was the Academy of Experience, and I was finished in the College of Hard Knocks! I come of a theatrical family – was born at a rehearsal on a one-night stand; so, you see, I had to be an actor – I couldn't help it.”

His first appearance in a movie was in 1910 in The Girl From Arizona. Years later, he remembered the experience: “When my first picture was finished I haunted the picture theaters, trying to see it, and when I finally did see it, oh, what a disappointment! It isn’t always pleasant to see yourself as others see you. But it was a great lesson, that first picture. I did many things in that first one that I did not do in the second. It has always been most pleasant work to me, out in the open most of the time, playing manly, vigorous roles, living a hundred different lives before the camera.”

In seventeen films made between 1910 and 1913, Wilbur established himself as a realistic performer who brought youth, good looks, and strength to his characterizations.

In April 1910, the American Pathé studio formed and began producing films in a remodeled cash register factory at Bound Brook, New Jersey. Paul Panzer was one of its first players. Pearl White, a performer from vaudeville who had some movie experience with the Powers Picture Play Company, joined the fledgling studio. Wilbur identified with these players and became a member of their stock company. When the company planned to make a serial, The Perils of Pauline, in 1914, Wilbur wanted the lead male role that would pair him with Pearl White. He tested for and won the coveted role of Harry in the proposed serial.

In 1916, Wilbur scored a personal hit with a five-reel Mutual Masterpiece film, Vengeance is Mine, a thrilling story about the abolishment of capital punishment.

Vitagraph then hired him for his next assignment, The Heart of Maryland (1921), and on its completion, Crane broke from film work altogether. He dropped out of Hollywood and returned to the stage – his first love – for several years. He wrote a modernization of The Bat, a play by Mary Roberts Rinehart and Avery Hopwood. There just was no work for him as an actor in films, so he took to the road. In 1924 Crane was touring in his own play, The Monster, a mystery tale that made The Bat look like a bedtime story. He was notable for his 1926 success in New York on Broadway in The Bride of the Lamb with Alice Brady, and later in 1930 in On the Spot with Anna May Wong.

Wilbur returned to Hollywood in 1929 to resume his acting, writing and directing career with many fictional and documentary films. In 1934, he appeared as an actor in three films: Name the Woman, High School Girl and Tomorrow’s Children, and also directed the last two. As an actor, he played his last on-screen part in Jungle Queen (1945).

Wilbur's work on radio included Big Town, for which he was director and producer.

His work as a writer and director continued for the next 20 years. His outstanding successes, many of which are still shown today, include the screenplay for House of Wax (1953). In 1959, Allied Artists made another version of Mary Roberts Rinehart's play The Bat, starring Vincent Price and Agnes Moorehead and directed by Wilbur. Crane's modernization had been an enormous success for many years, grossing upwards of $9,000,000. The story of eerie happenings in a creepy mansion rented for the summer by a writer of mystery novels had been perennially exciting for audiences, and kept him comfortably funded with royalties for years. Other films followed, including Solomon and Sheba (1959), Mysterious Island (1961), and House of Women (1962).

Crane suffered a stroke and died on October 18, 1973, in Toluca Lake, California.

== Partial filmography ==
=== As actor ===
- Through Fire and Air (1913)
- The Perils of Pauline (1914, Serial) – Harry Marvin
- The Road o'Strife (1915, Serial) – Robert Dane
- The Mirror (1915, Short) – The Mountaineer
- Vengeance Is Mine (1916) – John Loring
- A Law Unto Himself (1916) – Allan Dwight / Jean Belleau
- The Love Liar (1916) – David McCare
- The Conscience of John David (1916) – John David
- The Wasted Years (1916) – Old Weatherby / Harry Weatherby
- The Painted Lie (1917) – Lieutenant David Graton
- The Single Code (1917) – Hugh Carrington
- The Eye of Envy (1917) – Ambition, the Blacksmith
- The Blood of His Fathers (1917) – Morgan Gray / Abel Gray
- Unto the End (1917) – Jim O'Neill
- The Finger of Justice (1918) – Noel Delaney
- Breezy Jim (1919) – Breezy Jim
- Devil McCare (1919) – Devil McCare
- Stripped for a Million (1919) – Stanley Warren
- Something Different (1920) – Don Luis Vargas
- The Heart of Maryland (1921) – Alan Kendrick
- It's a Great Life (1929) – Minor Role (uncredited)
- Name the Woman (1934) – Blake
- Tomorrow's Children (1934) – Father O'Brien (uncredited)
- High School Girl (1934) – Carl Bryson
- Public Opinion (1935) – Paul Arnold
- Captain Calamity (1936) – Dr. Kelkey
- Yellow Cargo (1936) – Montie Brace

=== As director and/or writer ===
- The Monster (1925) (adapted from bis 1922 play)
- Lord Byron of Broadway (1930) (dialogue continuity)
- Children of Pleasure (1930) (playwright and dialogue)
- Tomorrow's Children (1934) (director and screenwriter)
- The People's Enemy (1935) (director)
- The Unwelcome Stranger (1935) (co-screenwriter)
- The Devil on Horseback (1936) (director)
- Captain Calamity (1936) (screenwriter)
- Yellow Cargo (1936) (director and screenwriter, also wrote original story)
- We're in the Legion Now! (1936) (director, additional dialogue)
- Dance Charlie Dance (1937) (screenwriter)
- Alcatraz Island (1937) (screenwriter)
- West of Shanghai (1937) (screenwriter)
- The Man Without a Country (1937) (director)
- Over the Wall (1938) (screenwriter)
- The Patient in Room 18 (1938) (co-director)
- Crime School (1938) (screenwriter)
- Penrod's Double Trouble (1938) (screenwriter)
- Girls on Probation (1938) (screenwriter)
- Declaration of Independence (1938 short) (director)
- Swingtime in the Movies (1938 short) (director and screenwriter)
- Blackwell's Island (1939) (screenwriter, also co-wrote story)
- Hell's Kitchen (1939) (screenwriter)
- The Man Who Dared (1939) (director)
- I Won't Play (1944 short) (director)
- I Am an American (1944 short) (director and writer)
- The Devil on Wheels (1947) (director and screenwriter)
- Adventures of Casanova (1948) (screenwriter)
- Canon City (1948) (director)
- The Amazing Mr. X (1948) (screenwriter)
- He Walked by Night (1948) (screenwriter)
- The Story of Molly X (1949) (director and screenwriter)
- Outside the Wall (1950) (director and screenwriter)
- I Was a Communist for the FBI (1951) (screenwriter)
- Inside the Walls of Folsom Prison (1951) (director and screenwriter)
- The Lion and the Horse (1952) (screenwriter)
- The Miracle of Our Lady of Fatima (1952) (screenwriter)
- House of Wax (1953) (screenwriter)
- Crime Wave (1954) (screenwriter)
- The Mad Magician (1954) (screenwriter)
- The Phenix City Story (1955) (screenwriter)
- Battle Stations (1956) (screenwriter)
- The Bat (1959) (director and screenwriter)
- Solomon and Sheba (1959) (story)
- Mysterious Island (1961) (screenwriter)
- House of Women (1962) (writer and uncredited director)
