= Bank Alarm =

1937 film by Louis J. Gasnier

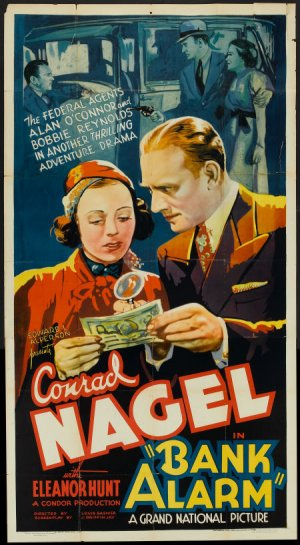
- Directed by: Louis J. Gasnier
- Screenplay by: Griffin Jay; David S. Lavy
- Story by: Eleanor Hunt (as Cynthia Meade); Lawrence Meade
- Produced by: George A. Hirliman
- Starring: Conrad Nagel; Eleanor Hunt
- Cinematography: Mack Stengler
- Edited by: Dan Milner
- Production company: George A. Hirliman Productions
- Distributed by: Grand National Pictures
- Release date: June 7, 1937
- Running time: 61 minutes
- Country: United States
- Language: English

Bank Alarm is a 1937 American crime film directed by Louis J. Gasnier and starring Conrad Nagel and Eleanor Hunt in the last of their four film G-Man film series.

== Plot ==
A G-Man (Conrad Nagel) and his girlfriend (Eleanor Hunt) follow a trail of clues left by bank robbers.

== Cast ==
- Conrad Nagel as Alan O'Connor
- Eleanor Hunt as Bobbie Reynolds
- Vince Barnett as Clarence 'Bulb' Callahan
- Wheeler Oakman as Joe Karlotti
- Nat Carr as Yoritz
- Frank Milan as Jerry Turner
- Wilma Francis as Kay O'Connor
- William L. Thorne as Police Inspector J. C. Macy (as William Thorn)
- Charles Delaney as Henchman Duke
- Phil Dunham as Leon Curtis - Bank Clerk (as Philip Dunham)
- Sidney D'Albrook as Coroner (as Syd D'Albrook)
- Pat Gleason as Henchman Barney
- Wilson Benge as Overman - Bank Bookkeeper
- Henry Roquemore as Nevada Sheriff
- Ed Schaefer as Tracy

== See also ==
- Public domain film
- List of American films of 1937
- List of films in the public domain in the United States
