= George Hirliman =

American film producer

George Hirliman (September 8, 1901 – March 30, 1952) was an American film producer best known for producing Reefer Madness.

== Biography ==
Hirliman was born September 8, 1901, in Fort Lee, New Jersey. He married Eleanor Hunt, an actress. The couple adopted Georgelle Hirliman in 1936, and later gave birth to daughter Kathy Hirliman in 1942.

He started his career at the Life Photo Film Corporation as an office boy and worked his way up to film director at Hirlagraph Motion Pictures, the largest film lab at that time. In 1924, his production company purchased the Solax Studios and renovated the two stages, and studios. The studio building was later destroyed in a fire.

When he moved to Hollywood, he worked five years at Consolidated Films Industries working on production and financing. During his tenure there, he made 30 feature films. In 1935, Hirliman produced De la Sarten a Fuego / From the Frying Pan into the Fire, an English and duel Spanish production. In 1936, he produced Reefer Madness and a series of four "G-Man" films starring his wife.

In 1936, he patented Hirlicolor. It was a two-color process that didn't need additional lighting and any color film lab could develop. During this time, he worked with Consolidated Films.

In 1941, he was working at the Colonnade Picture Studio in Miami.

In 1943, Hirliman's Film Classics contracted Hal Roach Studios to re-release much of the studios films where they also re-edited the films and threw away the title sequences.

He died on March 30, 1952, in New York City, New York.

== Selected filmography ==
- Men o’ War (1929)
- Pack Up Your Troubles (1932)
- Busy Bodies (1933)
- From the Frying Pan into the Fire / De la Sarten a Fuego (1935)
- Captain Calamity / El Capitan Tormenta (1935)
- Reefer Madness (1936)
- Yellow Cargo (1936)
- The Devil on Horseback (1936)
- El Carnival del Diablo (1937)
- Navy Spy (1937)
- Daniel Boone (1936)
- Bank Alarm (1937)
- El Dia Que Me Quieres (1938)
