= Grand National Films Inc. =

Film production company

Grand National Films, Inc.
- Industry: Film studio
- Founded: 1936
- Defunct: 1939
- Fate: Liquidation
- Headquarters: Los Angeles, California, United States
- Key people: Edward L. Alperson

Grand National Films, Inc (or Grand National Pictures, Grand National Productions and Grand National Film Distributing Co.) was an American independent motion picture production-distribution company in operation from 1936 to 1939. The company had no relation to the British Grand National Pictures (although the British firm used the American company's logo).

== History and releases ==
Edward L. Alperson, a film exchange manager, founded Grand National in 1936 on the basis of First Division Pictures, of which he was on the board of directors. What United Artists was to major independent producers, Harry F. Thomas's First Division was to low-budget producers: a convenient releasing outlet for individual pictures, and successful within its own market. Its feature-length releases, usually produced by Mayfair Pictures, Willis Kent, or Bernard B. Ray, were split between westerns, mysteries, "problem" melodramas, and action fare. First Division was also the original distributor of The March of Time, short-subject documentaries that were well received during their first year of production (1935); RKO took over the series after four installments.

In April 1936, Alperson took over First Division's film exchanges, existing product line, and contracts. The First Division name had become associated with low-budget productions, so Alperson renamed the company Grand National Film Distributing Company, aiming to release higher-grade features for independent theaters, just like fellow upstart Republic Pictures. By the summer, he had begun development of a California-based production entity, Grand National Productions, sharing the production facilities of comedy-shorts company Educational Pictures. By October, he had his first original films ready for release. Alperson created the studio's logo, a futuristic clock tower, with an idea to advertise "it's time to see a Grand National picture."

Producer Edward Finney, releasing through Grand National, gave the new company its first star attraction: singing cowboy Tex Ritter. The studio went on to produce other Westerns with established action star Ken Maynard, and two brief series with newcomers: singing cowboy Tex Fletcher and singing cowgirl Dorothy Page. Apart from westerns, its most consistent talent may have been comedy director Charles Lamont. Producer George Hirliman made a few features in a two-color process that he labeled "Hirlicolor", similar to Cinecolor. Hirliman also produced a four-film series starring his wife Eleanor Hunt and Conrad Nagel as federal agents Reynolds and O'Connor. Silent-era star Rod LaRocque appeared on a number of mystery films as the popular fiction and radio character The Shadow. Producer Franklyn Warner made four well-received features for Grand National (as "Fine Arts Pictures") in 1938–39.

The studio had an overseas distribution agreement with Associated British Pictures Corporation and bought the rights to one British Boris Karloff film, Juggernaut (released by Grand National in 1937).

In 1936, Grand National succeeded in signing James Cagney, after he had a falling-out with his home studio, Warner Bros. After making Great Guy for Grand National, Cagney was offered a gangster story, Angels with Dirty Faces, which Grand National had acquired. Cagney was worried about being typecast as a gangster, as he had been at Warner Bros., and opted instead for a musical satire on Hollywood called Something to Sing About, directed by Victor Schertzinger. The Cagney name was a huge coup for Grand National, and the company invested much more money than usual in its Cagney films, expecting a boxoffice bonanza. Despite Cagney's presence, however, neither picture turned a profit. The Cagney films were simply too expensive for the intended market. Grand National's customer base consisted of small, neighborhood movie theaters -- outside the major studios' theater networks, and accustomed to paying cheap rentals for low-budget films. Thus, Grand National was unable to recoup its investment, a key factor in the company's imminent collapse. The Angels with Dirty Faces property went to Warner Bros., as did Cagney himself.

In 1938, film executive Earle W. Hammons, president of Educational, joined forces with Grand National in an effort to expand both companies. The attempt was unsuccessful, however, and Grand National entered into liquidation in 1939. Its completed but unreleased films were sold to Universal Pictures, Columbia Pictures, and RKO Radio Pictures. The Grand National film library was split among reissue distributors, chiefly Screencraft Pictures and Astor Pictures. The Grand National physical plant was acquired by Producers Releasing Corporation (PRC).

== Partial filmography ==
Grand National released a total of 100 films in its three-year run. Many of its titles have lapsed into the public domain and are legally accessible online. Following is a list of representative Grand National releases.

- Captain Calamity (with George Houston, 1936)
- The Devil on Horseback (with Lili Damita, 1936)
- Headin' for the Rio Grande (with Tex Ritter, 1936)
- Lonely Road (British, with Clive Brook, 1936)
- Great Guy (with James Cagney, 1936)
- Trailin' Trouble (with Ken Maynard, 1937)
- Navy Spy (with Conrad Nagel and Eleanor Hunt, 1937)
- Renfrew of the Royal Mounted (with James Newill, 1937)
- Something to Sing About (with James Cagney, 1937)
- Swing It, Sailor! (with Wallace Ford and Ray Mayer, 1938)
- Here's Flash Casey (with Eric Linden, 1938)
- Mr. Boggs Steps Out (with Stuart Erwin, 1938)
- Long Shot (with Gordon Jones, 1939)
- Exile Express (with Anna Sten, 1939)
- Miracle on Main Street (with Margo, bought by Columbia for release in 1939)
- Isle of Destiny (with William Gargan, bought by RKO for release in 1940)
- Half a Sinner (with Constance Collier, bought by Universal for release in 1940)
