= List of former African-American child actors =

This is a list of former African-American child actors. These actors were aged 17 or less at the time they started acting but are currently 18 or over. The list also includes deceased child actors.

Movies and/or TV series they appeared in are mentioned only if they were still a child at the time of filming.

Name	Born [Died]	Years active (as child actors) & selected filmography
Adams, Brandon	1979	1986–2001 -- The Sandlot (1993) -- Moonwalker (1988)
Bagley, Ross	1988	1994–2004 -- The Little Rascals (1994)
Beard, Matthew "Stymie"	1925 [1981]	1929–1940 -- Our Gang (1930–35)
Berry, Ananias	1913 [1951]	1924–1927 -- The McDougall Kids
Berry, James	1915 [1969]	1924–1926 -- The McDougall Kids
Berry, Warren	1922 [1996]	1927 -- The McDougall Kids
Bledsoe, Tempestt	1973	1984–1988 -- The Cosby Show (1984–92)
Blunt, Erin	1963	1973–1979 -- The Bad News Bears (1976)
Boyce, Cameron	1999 [2019]	2008–2019 -- Jessie (2011–2015) -- Descendants series (2015–19)
Bridges, Todd	1965	1975–1980 -- Fish (1977–78) - Diff'rent Strokes (1978)
Brown, Orlando	1987	1995–2003 -- Family Matters (1996–98)
Cameron, Trent	1979	1989-1991 -- Homeroom (1989) -- The Kid Who Loved Christmas (1990) -- You Take the Kids (1990–91)
Carter, Ralph	1961	1971–1976 -- Raisin (1973) -- Good Times (1974–79)
Coleman, Gary	1968 [2010]	1974–1983 -- Diff'rent Strokes (1978–86)
Davis Jr., Sammy	1925 [1990]	1933 -- Rufus Jones for President (1933)
Edwards, Ed	1925 ca.	1931–1932 -- Penrod (1931–32)
Fields, Kim	1969	1977–1984 -- Baby, I'm Back (1978) -- Diff'rent Strokes (1979–81) -- The Facts of Life (1979–88)
Fishburne, Laurence	1961	1972–1976 -- One Life to Live (1973–76)
Foxworth, Jaimee	1979	1986–1993 -- Family Matters (1989–93)
Golden II, Norman D.	1984	1992–1998 -- Cop and a Half (1993) -- Moby Dick (1998)
Holmes, Tony	1967 ca.	1977–78 -- Baby, I'm Back (1978)
Hooks, Kevin	1958	1969–1972 -- J.T. (1969) -- Sounder (1972)
Hoskins, Allen "Farina"	1920 [1980]	1922–1936 -- Our Gang (1922–31)
Hurlic, Philip	1927 [2014]	1932–1942 -- Penrod and Sam (1937) -- Zenobia (1939)
Jackson, Eugene	1916 [2001]	1923–1931 -- Penrod and Sam (1923) -- Our Gang (1924–25) -- Little Annie Rooney (1925) -- Hearts in Dixie (1929)
Jackson, Janet	1966	1977–1981 -- Good Times (1977–79) -- Diff'rent Strokes (1980–84)
Jackson, Michael	1958 [2009]	1972
Jackson, Skai	2002	2007–2017 -- Jessie (2011–15)
Jeffries, Adam	1976	1988–1991 -- True Colors (1990–92)
Jordan, Michael B.	1987	1999–2002 - The Wire (2002)
Knight Pulliam, Keshia	1979	1984–1992 -- The Cosby Show (1984–92)
Leedy, Glenn	1935 [2004]	1942–1947 -- Jasper (1942-45) -- Song of the South (1946) -- The Burning Cross (1947)
Lewis, Emmanuel	1971	1982–1989 -- Webster (1983–89)
McClure, Bryton	1986	1990–2001 -- Family Matters (1990–97)
Morrison, Dorothy	1919	1923–29
Morrison, Ernest "Sunshine Sammy"	1912 [1989]	1917–1926 -- Our Gang (1922–24)
Mowry, Tamara	1978	1990–1996 -- Sister, Sister (1994–99)
Mowry, Tia	1978	1990–1996 -- Sister, Sister (1994–99)
Paulk, Marcus T.	1986	1993–2001 -- Moesha (1996–2001)
Perry, Steven	1952	1958–1969 -- A Raisin in the Sun (1961)
Pratt, Kyla	1986	1993–2001 -- Dr. Dolittle (1998)
Preston, Billy	1946 [2006]	1958 -- St. Louis Blues (1958)
Raven-Symoné	1985	1989–2000 -- The Cosby Show (1989–92) - Hangin' with Mr. Cooper (1992–97)
Raycole, Jazz	1988	1995–2003 -- My Wife and Kids (2001–02)
Richmond, Deon	1978	1987–1993 -- The Cosby Show (1986–92)
Richmond, Tequan	1992	2003–2006 -- Everybody Hates Chris (2005–2009)
Rivera, Naya	1987 [2020]	1991–2002 - The Royal Family (1991–92)
Robinson, Bumper	1974	1983–1992 -- Enemy Mine (1985) -- The Jacksons: An American Dream (1992)
Robinson, Jimmy	1918 [1967]	1927–1934 -- Mickey McGuire (1927–34) -- Penrod and Sam (1931)
Ross, Shavar	1971	1980–1986 -- Booker (1984)
Smith, Jaden	1998	2006–2013 -- The Pursuit of Happyness (2006) -- The Karate Kid (2010)
Smollett-Bell, Jurnee	1986	1991–2001 -- Full House (1992–94) -- Eve's Bayou (1997)
St. John, Kristoff	1966 [2019]	1975–1982 -- Roots: The Next Generations (1979)
Thomas, Billie "Buckwheat"	1931 [1980]	1934–1944 -- Our Gang (1934-44)
Thompson, Donald	1938	1948 -- The Quiet One (1948)
Van Peebles, Mario	1957	1968–1971 -- Sweet Sweetback's Baadasssss Song (1971)
Warner, Malcolm-Jamal	1970 [2025]	1982–85 -- The Cosby Show (1984–92)
Weaver, Jason	1979	1990–1994 -- The Jacksons: An American Dream (1992) -- Thea (1993–94) -- Summertime Switch (1994)
White, Jaleel	1976	1984–1991 -- Family Matters (1989–98)
Williams, Tyler James	1992	2000–2007 -- Everybody Hates Chris (2005–2009)

Kellie Shanygne Williams-Jackson Family Matters

== See also ==
- List of African-American actors
