= On Moonlight Bay (film) =

1951 film by Roy Del Ruth

- Theatrical release poster
- Directed by: Roy Del Ruth
- Screenplay by: Jack Rose; Melville Shavelson
- Based on: Penrod; 1914 novel and stories by Booth Tarkington
- Produced by: William Jacobs
- Starring: Doris Day; Gordon MacRae; Jack Smith
- Cinematography: Ernest Haller
- Edited by: Thomas Reilly
- Music by: Max Steiner
- Distributed by: Warner Bros. Pictures
- Release date: July 26, 1951 (New York)
- Running time: 95 minutes
- Country: United States
- Language: English
- Budget: $1,194,000
- Box office: $3,730,000 $2.5 million (U.S. rentals)

On Moonlight Bay is a 1951 American musical romantic comedy film directed by Roy Del Ruth and starring Doris Day and Gordon MacRae. Loosely based on the Penrod novels by Booth Tarkington, especially Penrod and Sam, the film tells the story of the Winfield family at the turn of the 20th century. A sequel, By the Light of the Silvery Moon, was released in 1953.

The film is the fifth adaptation of the Penrod novels, following Penrod (1922) and films titled Penrod and Sam in 1923, 1931 and 1937.

== Plot ==
In a small Indiana town in the mid-1910s, the Winfield household has just moved into a larger house in a nicer neighborhood. The family includes George, the father, who is a banker, his wife Alice, their grown tomboyish daughter Margie, their mischievous precocious trouble-making son Wesley and their exasperated housekeeper Stella. No one but George is happy about the move until Margie meets their new neighbor Bill Sherman, home on a break from his studies at Indiana University. Margie and Bill are immediately attracted to each other, causing Margie to change her focus from baseball to trying to become a proper young woman. Margie and Bill develop a romantic relationship despite Bill's unconventional thoughts on life. Bill does not believe in the institution of marriage or appreciate the role that money plays in society.

The road to a happy life for Margie and Bill is hindered by distance (as Bill returns to school), Margie's attempts to become a proper woman, her father's disapproval and preference for another suitor, her brother's continual meddling and the nation's entry into World War I.

Margie's father eventually softens and becomes more receptive to her relationship with Bill.

== Cast ==
- Doris Day as Marjorie Winfield
- Gordon MacRae as William "Bill" Sherman
- Jack Smith as Hubert Wakely
- Leon Ames as George Wadsworth Winfield
- Rosemary DeCamp as Alice Winfield
- Mary Wickes as the housekeeper Stella
- Ellen Corby as Miss Mary Stevens
- Billy Gray as Wesley Winfield
- James Dobson as Army sergeant
- Henry East as Doughboy by Train
- Jeffrey Stevens as Jim Sherman
- Eddie Marr as Contest Barker
- Esther Dale as Aunt Martha

== Songs ==
- "On Moonlight Bay"
- "Cuddle Up a Little Closer"
- "Till We Meet Again"
- "Tell Me"
- "I'm Forever Blowing Bubbles"
- "Christmas Story"
- "Love Ya"
- "It's a Long Way to Tipperary"
- "Pack Up Your Troubles"

== Reception ==
In a contemporary review for The New York Times, critic A. H. Weiler wrote: "The Warner Brothers, who apparently were weighed down by a consignment of durable ditties and Booth Tarkington's even more durable 'Penrod' stories, have combined these seemingly ageless ingredients into 'On Moonlight Bay' ... Strange as it may seem, however, these are not particular assets and the principals, yodeling away with much fervor, are not especially impressive. Booth Tarkington may be stirring fitfully in Paradise as this version of his young loves makes the grade against a World War I Technicolored background. ... Although it strives to develop a genuine nostalgic mood, all that 'On Moonlight Bay' seems to create, sadly enough, is the feeling that this film format is old hat."

According to Warner Bros. records, the film earned $2,738,000 in the U.S. and $992,000 in other markets.

On the review aggregator website Rotten Tomatoes, 87% of 45 critics' reviews are positive. The website's consensus reads: "Doris Day and Gordon MacRae reunite in this droll, nostalgic musical that takes out many song pages from the tunes of yore with pleasant results."

== Accolades ==
The film was nominated for inclusion in the American Film Institute's 2006 list AFI's Greatest Movie Musicals.
