= Penrod and His Twin Brother =

1938 film by William C. McGann

- Directed by: William C. McGann
- Screenplay by: William Jacobs; Hugh Cummings
- Based on: Penrod; 1914 novel by: Booth Tarkington 1916 novel Penrod and Sam; Booth Tarkington
- Produced by: Bryan Foy
- Starring: Billy Mauch; Bobby Mauch; Frank Craven; Spring Byington; Charles Halton; Claudia Coleman
- Cinematography: Arthur L. Todd
- Edited by: Doug Gould
- Music by: Howard Jackson
- Production company: Warner Bros. Pictures
- Distributed by: Warner Bros. Pictures
- Release date: February 26, 1938
- Running time: 63 minutes
- Country: United States
- Language: English

Penrod and His Twin Brother is a 1938 American comedy film directed by William C. McGann and written by William Jacobs and Hugh Cummings. The film stars Billy Mauch, Bobby Mauch, Frank Craven, Spring Byington, Charles Halton and Claudia Coleman. The film was released by Warner Bros. Pictures on February 26, 1938.

== Cast ==
- Billy Mauch as Penrod
- Bobby Mauch as Danny
- Frank Craven as Mr. Schofield
- Spring Byington as Mrs. Schofield
- Charles Halton as Mr. Bitts
- Claudia Coleman as Mrs. Bitts
- Jackie Morrow as Rodney Bitts
- Philip Hurlic as Vermin
- Benny Bartlett as Chuck
- Bernice Pilot as Delia
- Johnnie Pirrone Jr. as Sam
- Billy Lechner as Donald
- Charley Foy as Kraemer
- Charles Jordan as Shorty
- Jay Adler as Johnson
- Max Wagner as Blackie
- Eddie Collins as Captain
- Fred Lawrence as Clark
- Robert Homans as Chief Flynn
