= Penrod (disambiguation) =

Penrod is a collection of comic sketches by Booth Tarkington published in 1914.

Penrod may also refer to:

== People ==
- Guy Penrod (born 1963), American gospel singer
- Jack Penrod (1939–2025), American entrepreneur
- Jerry Penrod (born 1946), American bass player
- Steve Penrod, American educator and professor of psychology
- Zach Penrod (born 1997), American baseball player

== Places ==
- Penrod, Kentucky, an unincorporated community in Muhlenberg County

== Other uses ==
- Penrod (film), a 1922 film based on the above-noted Booth Tarkington work
- Penrod and Sam (disambiguation), a 1916 novel Booth Tarkington, his sequel to the 1914 Penrod, and three movies based on the work
- Penrod Jashber, a 1929 novel by Booth Tarkington, his third and final Penrod work

== See also ==
- Pendor, a fictional world in several works by American author Elf Sternberg
