= Gentle Julia =

Gentle Julia may refer to:

- Gentle Julia (novel), a 1922 work by Booth Tarkington
- Gentle Julia (1923 film), a silent film adaptation
- Gentle Julia (1936 film), a film adaptation
