= Penrod and Sam =

Penrod and Sam may refer to:

- Penrod and Sam (novel), a 1916 novel by Booth Tarkington, and films based on it:
  - Penrod and Sam (1923 film)
  - Penrod and Sam (1931 film)
  - Penrod and Sam (1937 film)
