= Penrod =

Book by Booth Tarkington

- First edition
- Author: Booth Tarkington
- Language: English
- Publisher: Doubleday, Page
- Publication date: 1914
- Publication place: United States
- Media type: Print (hardcover)
- Followed by: Penrod and Sam

Penrod is a collection of comic sketches by Booth Tarkington that was first published in 1914. The book follows the misadventures of Penrod Schofield, an eleven-year-old boy growing up in the pre-World War I Midwestern United States, in a similar vein to The Adventures of Tom Sawyer. In Penrod, Tarkington established characters who appeared in two further books, Penrod and Sam (1916) and Penrod Jashber (1929). The three books were published together in one volume, Penrod: His Complete Story.

== Plotlines ==
- Chapters 1–6: Penrod, against his will, is cast as "The Child Sir Lancelot" in the local production The Pageant of the Table Round.
- Chapters 7–11: After seeing a movie about the evils of drink, Penrod uses the film's plot as an excuse for daydreaming in class.
- Chapters 12–14: It's the Annual Cotillion for Penrod's Dancing Class, and Penrod, who's known as "The Worst Boy in Town", has to find a female partner.
- Chapters 15–17: It's summer vacation. After meeting Herman and Verman, the children of a local black family, Penrod and Sam set up a show which becomes even more popular by the addition of the son of the most socially prominent family in town, which by coincidence shares the same last name as a notorious convicted murderess.
- Chapters 18–20: A dollar, given to him by his sister's boyfriend to leave them alone, proves Penrod's undoing.
- Chapters 21–23: Penrod meets a local tough kid and falls victim to hero-worship of the same. Eventually Herman and Verman try to kill the tough kid with a lawn mower and a garden scythe.
- Chapters 24–25: Penrod hates to be called a "Little Gentleman", and the local barber's urging other children to keep calling him that leads to fighting with tar. After they get cleaned up Penrod's older sister has a bachelor visitor who keeps calling Penrod "Little Gentleman", so when the bachelor asks Penrod to get his hat, Penrod puts tar in the man's hat.
- Chapters 26–27: Penrod, Sam and other local boys' discussing what they want to be when they grow up leads to them all wanting to be ministers and they make the kid who had the idea climb a tree and yell "I'm goin to heaven! I'm goin to hell!" The kid's mother thinks Penrod is a horrible boy and is going to be a criminal but Penrod says he's going to be a minister.
- Chapters 28–31: It's Penrod's twelfth birthday, and the arrival of a pretty new girl from New York turns his party into an occasion no one in town may ever forget.

== Adaptations ==
Penrod, its sequels, and characters occurring therein were adapted into numerous stage and film versions:

- Penrod (1918), play adapted by Edward E. Rose and first staged at the Apollo Theatre in Atlantic City.
- Penrod (1922), silent feature film, with Wesley Barry as Penrod and Gordon Griffith as Sam
- Penrod and Sam (1923), silent feature film, based on the first sequel to Penrod, with Ben Alexander as Penrod and Joe Butterworth as Sam
- Penrod and Sam (1931), feature film with Leon Janney as Penrod and Frank Coghlan, Jr. as Sam
- A series of 10-minute comedy shorts filmed in New York by Vitaphone and released by Warner Bros. featuring Tarkington's characters. All were directed by Alfred J. Goulding except Hot Dog, directed by Roy Mack. Starring Billy Hayes as Penrod:
  - Snakes Alive (September 26, 1931) with Bobby Jordan as Sam
  - Batter Up! (October 24, 1931) with Bobby Jordan as Sam
  - One Good Deed (December 5, 1931)
  - Detectuvs (January 2, 1932) with David Gorcey as Sam
  - His Honor, Penrod (January 23, 1932) with David Gorcey as Sam, and Ray Collins
  - Hot Dog (February 20, 1932)
  - Penrod's Bull Pen (March 19, 1932).
- Penrod and Sam (1937), with Billy Mauch as Penrod, the first of three Penrod films starring the Mauch twins.
- Penrod and His Twin Brother (1938), with Billy and Bobby Mauch as the leads.
- Penrod's Double Trouble (1938), with Billy and Bobby Mauch as the leads.
- On Moonlight Bay (1951), a musical with Billy Gray as Wesley Winfield (Penrod), Doris Day as his sister Marjorie (the lead), and Gordon MacRae as her love interest.
- By the Light of the Silvery Moon (1953), the musical sequel to On Moonlight Bay, with the same cast.

On September 25, 1949, a one-hour adaptation by Robert Gray was broadcast on NBC University Theater, with Johnny McGovern as Penrod and Jeffrey Silver as Sam.

A "Revised" edition of Penrod, "revising or omitting certain ethnic descriptions from the original Penrod manuscript that might be considered offensive or inappropriate", was published by Lasso Books (ISBN 1548402109) in 2017 and released in audiobook format in 2018.
