= Charles Halton =

American actor

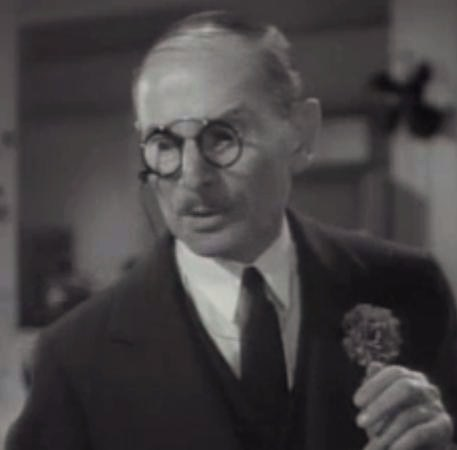
- Halton in Nancy Drew... Reporter (1939)
- Born: March 16, 1876; Washington, D.C.
- Died: April 16, 1959 (aged 83); Los Angeles, California
- Occupation: Actor
- Years active: 1901–58
- Spouse: Lelah Coyle (m. 1944)

Charles Halton (March 16, 1876 – April 16, 1959) was an American character actor who appeared in over 180 films.

== Life and career ==
=== Early years ===
Halton was born in Washington, District of Columbia, in 1876. He trained at the New York Academy of Dramatic Arts.

=== Career ===
In the early 1900s Halton toured Europe with Lillian Russell. He made his Broadway debut in 1901, after which he appeared in about 35 productions during the next 50 years. For the summer of 1911 he performed as a member of the summer stock cast at Elitch Theatre in Denver, Colorado. From the 1920s, Halton's thinning hair, rimless glasses, stern-looking face and officious manner were also familiar to generations of American moviegoers. Whether playing the neighborhood busybody, a stern government bureaucrat or weaselly attorney, Halton's characters tried to drive the "immoral influences" out of the neighborhood, foreclose on the orphanage, evict the poor widow and her children from their apartment, or any other number of dastardly deeds, all justified usually by "...I'm sorry but that's my job."

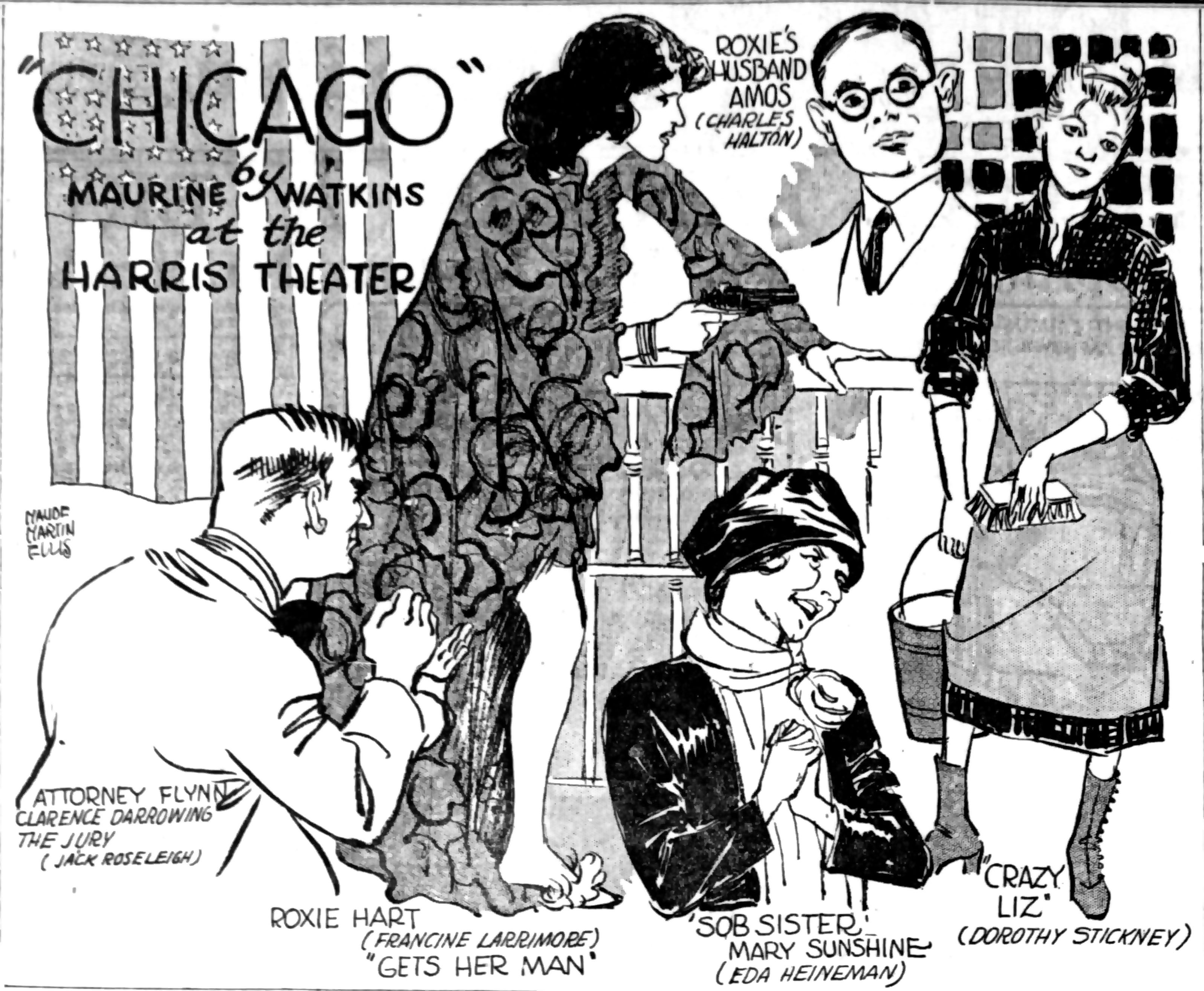
Halton and fellow cast members in Chicago Tribune image depicting the 1927 Chicago production of the play Chicago.

Among Halton's best-known roles were Dr. Glass, the hotel doctor in Room Service (1938), starring the Marx Brothers; Mr. Carter, the bank examiner in Frank Capra's It's a Wonderful Life (1946); the Polish theatre producer Dobosh in Ernst Lubitsch's To Be or Not to Be (1942), and a county official from Idaho in Alfred Hitchcock's Mr. & Mrs. Smith (1941). In Enemy of Women (1944), the story of Joseph Goebbels, Halton played against type as a kindly radio performer of children's stories who is arrested by the Nazis.

Although his career slowed down in the 1950s, he also played roles in numerous television series. His 40-year film career ended with High School Confidential (1958), after which he retired.

=== Personal life and death ===
Halton married the former Lelah Coyle on August 8, 1944, in Gardnerville, Nevada, after she was divorced from John J. Beckman. On April 16, 1959, he died of hepatitis at his home in Los Angeles. He was 83.

== Selected filmography ==
- The Adventurer (1917) – Austin
- God's Man (1917)
- Behind the Mask (1917) – Larrabee
- The Climbers (1919) – Jordan
- The Tower of Jewels (1920) – Jimmy the Rat
- Laughter (1930) – Winslow – Gibson's Secretary (uncredited)
- Honor Among Lovers (1931) – Wilkes
- Storm at Daybreak (1933) – Villager (uncredited)
- His Double Life (1933) – Newsman on Phone (uncredited)
- Twenty Million Sweethearts (1934) – Sound Effects Man (uncredited)
- Come and Get It (1936) – Mr. Hewitt
- More Than a Secretary (1936) – Mr. Crosby
- Sing Me a Love Song (1936) – Mr. Willard (uncredited)
- Gold Diggers of 1937 (1936) – Dr. Bell
- Black Legion (1937) – Osgood
- Stolen Holiday (1937) – Le Grande
- Penrod and Sam (1937) – Mr. Rodney H. Bitts
- Ready, Willing and Able (1937) – Brockman
- Woman Chases Man (1937) – Mr. Judd
- Pick a Star (1937) – Mr. Klawheimer
- The Road Back (1937) – Uncle Rudolph
- Talent Scout (1937) – M.B. Carter
- Dead End (1937) – Whitey (uncredited)
- The Prisoner of Zenda (1937) – Passport Officer (uncredited)
- Partners in Crime (1937) – Silas Wagon
- Trouble at Midnight (1937) – Everett Benson
- Blossoms on Broadway (1937) – Dr. Gilgallon
- Penitentiary (1938) – Leonard Nettleford (uncredited)
- Gold Is Where You Find It (1938) – Turner (uncredited)
- Penrod and His Twin Brother (1938) – Mr. Bitts
- Bluebeard's Eighth Wife (1938) – Monsieur de la Coste – Store President (uncredited)
- Stolen Heaven (1938) – Friedrich Polesie
- The Saint in New York (1938) – Vincent Nather
- I'll Give a Million (1938) – Mayor
- Penrod's Double Trouble (1938) – Mr. Bitts
- I Am the Law (1938) – George Leander
- Room Service (1938) – Dr. Glass
- The Mad Miss Manton (1938) – Popsy – the Lawyer (uncredited)
- A Man to Remember (1938) – Atty. Clyde Perkins (uncredited)
- The Girl Downstairs (1938) – Karovian Ambassador (uncredited)
- Federal Man-Hunt (1938) – Damon Lauber
- Jesse James (1939) – Heywood
- Nancy Drew... Reporter (1939) – Newspaper Publicity Man (uncredited)
- I'm from Missouri (1939) – Henry Couch
- They Made Her a Spy (1939) – Beldon
- Sudden Money (1939) – Mr. Wixby
- Dodge City (1939) – Surrett's Lawyer
- Juarez (1939) – Mr. Roberts (scenes deleted)
- Ex-Champ (1939) – Trilby
- They Asked for It (1939) – Dr. Tyler
- Young Mr. Lincoln (1939) – Hawthorne (uncredited)
- News Is Made at Night (1939) – Lt. Gov. Elmer Hinge
- Indianapolis Speedway (1939) – Mayor
- Lady of the Tropics (1939) – Manager of Rubber Company (uncredited)
- Charlie Chan at Treasure Island (1939) – Redley
- Golden Boy (1939) – Newspaperman (scenes deleted)
- Dust Be My Destiny (1939) – Pawnshop Owner (uncredited)
- No Place to Go (1939) – Mr. Bradford
- Reno (1939) – Augustus Welch
- The Hunchback of Notre Dame (1939) – Printer (uncredited)
- Swanee River (1939) – Pond (uncredited)
- The Shop Around the Corner (1940) – Detective
- Dr. Ehrlich's Magic Bullet (1940) – Sensenbrenner
- The Ghost Comes Home (1940) – Mr. Stark – Steamship Official (uncredited)
- Virginia City (1940) – Ralston – Virginia City Banker (uncredited)
- Dr. Cyclops (1940) – Dr. Bulfinch
- The Man with Nine Lives (1940) – Doctor in Front Row in Final Scene (uncredited)
- The Doctor Takes a Wife (1940) – Dr. Streeter
- 20 Mule Team (1940) – Henry Adams
- Lillian Russell (1940) – Dr' Dobbins
- Gangs of Chicago (1940) – Bromo
- They Drive By Night (1940) – Farnsworth, a loan shark (uncredited)
- Lucky Partners (1940) – Chamber of Commerce Official (uncredited)
- I Love You Again (1940) – Mr. Leonard Harkspur Sr. (uncredited)
- Stranger on the Third Floor (1940) – Albert Meng
- Foreign Correspondent (1940) – Bradley
- Young People (1940) – Moderator
- The Westerner (1940) – Mort Borrow
- Calling All Husbands (1940) – Hadley Weaver
- Tugboat Annie Sails Again (1940) – Alec Severn
- Little Nellie Kelly (1940) – Second Judge (uncredited)
- Behind the News (1940) – Neil Saunders
- Mr. & Mrs. Smith (1941) – Harry Deever, an Idaho county official
- Blonde Inspiration (1941) – Mr. Packer (uncredited)
- Meet the Chump (1941) – Dr. Stephanowsky
- The Great Mr. Nobody (1941) – Mr. Bixby (uncredited)
- Tobacco Road (1941) – Mayor
- Footlight Fever (1941) – Mr. E.J. Fingernogle (uncredited)
- Mr. District Attorney (1941) – Hazelton – Barrett's Aide
- The Lady from Cheyenne (1941) – Judge (uncredited)
- Million Dollar Baby (1941) – Parkinson
- A Very Young Lady (1941) – Oliver Brixton
- Dance Hall (1941) – Mr. Frederick Newmeyer
- Three Sons o' Guns (1941) – Haddock
- Lady Scarface (1941) – Mr. Pinchback (uncredited)
- I Was a Prisoner on Devil's Island (1941) – Commandant
- Ellery Queen and the Perfect Crime (1941) – Rufus Smith
- The Smiling Ghost (1941) – Great Uncle Ames Bentley
- One Foot in Heaven (1941) – Haskins (uncredited)
- Three Girls About Town (1941) – Doc – Coroner (uncredited)
- Unholy Partners (1941) – Phil Kaper – Attorney
- Look Who's Laughing (1941) – Cudahy
- H. M. Pulham, Esq. (1941) – Walter Kaufman
- The Body Disappears (1941) – Professor Moggs
- Captains of the Clouds (1942) – Supintendent Nolan
- The Lady Is Willing (1942) – Dr. Jones (uncredited)
- To Be or Not to Be (1942) – Producer Dobosh
- The Adventures of Martin Eden (1942) – Cotton, Publisher of Continental Magazine (uncredited)
- Juke Box Jenny (1942) – Judge
- Saboteur (1942) – Second Sheriff (uncredited)
- The Spoilers (1942) – Jonathan Stuve
- Whispering Ghosts (1942) – Attorney Mark Gruber
- In Old California (1942) – Mr. Hayes
- They All Kissed the Bride (1942) – Doctor (scenes deleted)
- Tombstone, the Town Too Tough to Die (1942) – Mayor Dan Crane
- There's One Born Every Minute (1942) – Trumbull
- Priorities on Parade (1942) – 2nd Examiner
- Henry Aldrich, Editor (1942) – Elias Noonan
- Across the Pacific (1942) – A.V. Smith
- My Sister Eileen (1942) – Mr. Hawkins – Newspaper Editor (uncredited)
- You Can't Escape Forever (1942) – Charley Gates (uncredited)
- That Other Woman (1942) – AV Smith
- Lady Bodyguard (1943) – T. L. Baxter
- Jitterbugs (1943) – Samuel L. Cass (uncredited)
- My Kingdom for a Cook (1943) – Oliver Bradbury (uncredited)
- Flesh and Fantasy (1943) – Mask Shop Proprietor (uncredited)
- Government Girl (1943) – Wilkins – Hotel Clerk (uncredited)
- Whispering Footsteps (1943) – Harry Hammond
- Up in Arms (1944) – Dr. Roger B. Freyheisen
- Rationing (1944) – Ezra Weeks
- It Happened Tomorrow (1944) – Doctor (uncredited)
- Address Unknown (1944) – Censorial Pipsqueak
- Wilson (1944) – Colonel House
- Shadows in the Night (1944) – Doc Stacey (uncredited)
- Enemy of Women (1944) – Uncle Hugo, Radio Performer
- The Town Went Wild (1944) – Mr. Tweedle
- A Tree Grows in Brooklyn (1945) – Mr. Barker (uncredited)
- Rhapsody in Blue (1945) – Mr. Kast
- Midnight Manhunt (1945) – Henry Miggs
- Mama Loves Papa (1945) – Appleby
- She Went to the Races (1945) – Dr. Collyer
- The Thin Man Goes Home (1945) – R.T. Tatum (uncredited)
- The Fighting Guardsman (1946) – Hyperion Picot (uncredited)
- Because of Him (1946) – Mr. Dunlap
- Three Little Girls in Blue (1946) – Lawyer Hoskins (uncredited)
- Sister Kenny (1946) – Mr. Smith (uncredited)
- The Best Years of Our Lives (1946) – Prew
- It's a Wonderful Life (1946) – Mr. Carter, bank examiner (uncredited)
- Singin' in the Corn (1946) – Obediah Davis
- The Ghost Goes Wild (1947) – T. O'Connor Scott
- The Bachelor and the Bobby Soxer (1947) – Mr. Mittwick – High School Principal (uncredited)
- If You Knew Susie (1948) – Pringle (uncredited)
- Summer Holiday (1948) – Mr. Lipska (uncredited)
- My Dear Secretary (1948) – Mr. Kilbride (uncredited)
- 3 Godfathers (1948) – Tolliver Latham
- Hideout (1949) – Gabriel Wotter
- The Daring Caballero (1949) – Ed J. Hodges
- The Sickle or the Cross (1949) – Dr. Short
- The Traveling Saleswoman (1950) – Banker Clumhill (uncredited)
- The Nevadan (1950) – Red Sand Bank Manager (uncredited)
- When Willie Comes Marching Home (1950) – Mr. Fettles (uncredited)
- Stella (1950) – Mr. Beeker (uncredited)
- Joe Palooka in the Squared Circle (1950) – Merkle – the Shyster
- Gasoline Alley (1951) – Pettit
- Here Comes the Groom (1951) – Cusick (uncredited)
- Three for Bedroom "C" (1952) – Well-Wisher at Station (uncredited)
- Carrie (1952) – Factory Foreman
- I Love Melvin (1953) – Mr. Prouty, Druggist (uncredited)
- A Slight Case of Larceny (1953) – Willard Maibrunn – Magna Gold Oil Co.
- The Affairs of Dobie Gillis (1953) – Dean (Grainbelt U.) (uncredited)
- The Moonlighter (1953) – Clemmons Usqubaugh – Undertaker
- A Star is Born (1954) – Paymaster #1 (uncredited)
- Friendly Persuasion (1956) – Brother Cope – Elder (uncredited)
- High School Confidential (1958) – W.O. Robinson, High School Principal (uncredited) (final film role)
