= Bernice Pilot =

American actress

Bernice Pilot (June 28, 1897 - September 22, 1981) was an American actress. She appeared in numerous films including as the female lead in the 1929 film Hearts in Dixie. In most of Pilot's film roles, she portrayed maids.

Pilot was born in Pawnee, Oklahoma in 1897. She died in San Bernardino, California in 1981, aged 84.

== Filmography ==
- Hearts in Dixie (1929) as Chloe
- Penrod and Sam (1937) as Delia
- Penrod's Double Trouble (1938) as Delia
- Penrod and His Twin Brother (1938) as Delia
- The Beloved Brat (1938)
- Women Are Like That (1938) as Maude
- My Bill (1938) as Beulah
- No Place to Go (1939) as Birdie
- Sweepstakes Winner (1939) as Martha (Uncredited)
- Pride of the Blue Grass (1939) as Beverly
- Criminals Within (1941) as Mamie
- Tight Shoes (1941)
- Criminals Within (1941)
