= Leon Janney =

American actor and radio personality (1917–1980)

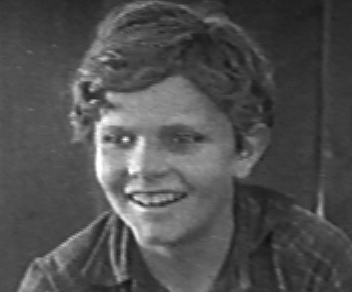
- Janney as Spud in Bear Shooters (1930)
- Born: Leon Elbert Janney; April 1, 1917; Ogden, Utah, U.S.
- Died: October 28, 1980 (aged 63); Guadalajara, Jalisco, Mexico
- Other name: David Seal
- Occupations: Actor, radio personality
- Years active: 1920–1980
- Spouse(s): Jessica Pepper (1936–1936, divorce); Dorothy Burbank (1968–1980)

Leon Janney (April 1, 1917 – October 28, 1980) was an American actor and radio personality from 1920 to 1980.

== Career ==
Leon Elbert Janney was born in Ogden, Utah, to Nathan Haines Janney and Bernice Rebecca Kohn. The names of his parents are confirmed in both Janney's death certificate (available in Ancestry.com) and in a birth announcement in The Ogden Standard, April 4, 1917. His mother had reportedly performed using the name Bernice Raymon (The Washington Post, Oct. 31, 1915), or Ramon (Philadelphia Inquirer April 1, 1934). The story in the Inquirer states that Janney's mother gave him the stage name Laon Ramon after moving to Los Angeles to seek more acting work for him. A story by Harold W. Cohen in the March 12, 1931 Pittsburgh Post-Gazette includes details about why the stage name was abandoned and Janney returned to using his birth name, Leon Janney, professionally. Sources stating that Janney was born with the surname Ramon are thus incorrect.

Janney made his first theatrical appearance at age two before an audience at the Pantages Theatre in his hometown. He spent some years in vaudeville, and made his first appearance on radio in 1926, making the leap to legitimate theater soon after.

His movie debut came with Victor Sjöström's The Wind starring Lillian Gish. While he was working with some of Hollywood's greatest, he used the opportunity to study the actors, and ask for advice at every chance he could. He appeared in a string of movies portraying the boyhood incarnations of actors such as Ricardo Cortez, Reginald Denny, and Conrad Nagel. Producer Hal Roach took notice of Janney and hired him to appear in the Our Gang comedy Bear Shooters as "Spud". However, Roach realized that he was too old to gel with the other members of the gang, and Bear Shooters marked his only appearance as a Little Rascal. In 1931 he starred in the second film adaptation of Booth Tarkington's Penrod and Sam.

By the mid-1930s, Janney was considered the quintessential male juvenile star, and was earning more than $100,000 a year. As he entered his teenage years, he realized that everywhere he went he would be recognized and surrounded by fans, something he did not care for. He turned to radio and worked on the series The Parker Family, playing all-American boy Richard Parker. He also portrayed that character in an experimental TV broadcast of the program on NBC-TV on May 9, 1941.

Although his true love was theater work, he used his radio work to become a master dialectician. Janney was a master of using convincing foreign accents, and even more so at adapting regional dialects of the United States. After serving in World War II as a translator, he continued working in radio and theater.

In the 1948–1949 season on NBC-TV, Janney was one of the hosts of Stop Me If You've Heard This One. He also was a panelist on the game show Think Fast on ABC-TV in 1949–1950.

Janney was blacklisted in films in the 1950s due to the "red scare" — ironic, since the Army drafted him specifically because he could speak fluent Russian, and he had specifically learned this talent so his accents would sound authentic on radio shows. Nevertheless, he continued to work regularly due to his preference for theatrical work, appearing in such plays as The School for Scandal and The Gazebo.

On radio, in 1942, Janney starred in The Adventures of Dick Cole a syndicated action and adventure show aimed at pre-teen boys. He also portrayed Lee Chan on "The Adventures of Charlie Chan" on old-time radio. His other roles on radio programs included Paul Sherwood on Mr. Ace and Jane, Danny Stratford on The Life of Mary Sothern, Eddie McCoy on The Ethel Merman Show, Chick Carter on Chick Carter, Boy Detective,.

Janney appeared in dozens of other radio series as well, including some of the most popular and longest running, such as the critically acclaimed dramatic series Suspense (1942–1962) – approximately 900 episodes are known to exist, which can be found and heard on the internet. Other examples include: The Mysterious Traveler. He appeared in several episodes of the adult science fiction series X Minus One. Often Janney played multiple roles, using his extraordinary ability to quickly alter his voice. This talent was used in CBS radio's successful radio drama "revival" series, CBS Radio Mystery Theater (1974–1982). Janney starred in at least 80 episodes. He also made countless uncredited appearances too, until his death in 1980. Throughout the 1960s and 1970s Janney did voice-overs for hundreds of television commercials and PSAs.

Janney appeared in bit roles on such television shows as Car 54, Where Are You?, The Defenders and The Jackie Gleason Show. He made his first film appearance in more than a decade, playing a sympathetic guard in The Last Mile. He was the spokesman for the New York Mets in their Rheingold Beer commercials for the team's first two seasons (1962–1963). In his final years, he was a regular on television shows, Another World, and playing two roles on The Edge of Night. His last film was Charly with Cliff Robertson and Claire Bloom in 1968. In the same year he played Ed Gorton on the detective TV series Hawk.

On Broadway, Janney appeared in Three Men on a Horse (1969), Kelly (1965), The Last Analysis (1964), Nobody Loves an Albatross (1963), Venus at Large (1962), A Call on Kuprin (1961), The Gazebo (1958), A Shadow of My Enemy (1957), Measure for Measure (1957), Threepenny Opera (1955), The Flowering Peach (1954), Madam, Will You Walk (1953), Ghost for Sale (1941), Foreigners (1939), The Bough Breaks (1937), Mulatto (1935), Parade (1935), The Simpleton of the Unexpected Isles1935) and Every Thursday (1934).

== Activity in organizations ==
Janney was elected to The Lambs in 1940, and was a member of the board of the Screen Actors Guild and the council of Actors' Equity Association. He was also involved in activities of the American Federation of Television and Radio Artists, including being president of its New York local in 1963 and serving on that local's board. He lost a campaign for sheriff of Bergen County, New Jersey, after campaigning on a platform of abolishing the office.

== Personal life ==
On March 26, 1936, Janney married Jessica Pepper in Armonk, New York. They were divorced on August 4, 1936.

When he died, Janney was married to Dorothy (née Burbank), his fourth wife.

As an adult, Janney expressed regret for having been a child actor, saying, "I'm resentful about my childhood, resentful toward my mother who pushed me into show business when I was barely walking. I never had a childhood."

== Death ==
Janney died of cancer on October 28, 1980, in Guadalajara, Mexico, aged 63.

== Filmography ==
Year	Title	Role	Notes
1927	The Red Mill	Village Boy	Uncredited
1927	Quality Street	Student	Uncredited
1927	On Your Toes	Elliott Beresford as a Boy	Uncredited
1928	Comrades	Perry O'Toole as a boy	
1928	Abie's Irish Rose	Little Abie	Uncredited
1928	The Wind	Cora's Child	
1929	The Leatherneck	Altar Boy	Uncredited
1929	The Younger Generation	Eddie Lesser as a Boy	Uncredited
1930	Courage	Bill Colbrook	
1930	Old English	Jock Larne	
1930	The Doorway to Hell	Jackie Ricarno	
1931	The Mask Falls		
1931	Father's Son	Bill Emory	
1931	Their Mad Moment	Narcio	
1931	Penrod and Sam	Penrod	
1932	Police Court	Junior Barry	
1940	Stolen Paradise	Richard 'Dick' Gordon	
1959	The Last Mile	Callahan	
1968	Charly	Dr. Nemur	
1970	Mir hat es immer Spaß gemacht	Mr. McCarthy	

== Bibliography ==
- John Holmstrom, The Moving Picture Boy: An International Encyclopaedia from 1895 to 1995, Norwich, Michael Russell, 1996, p. 76.
