= My Bill =

1938 film by John Farrow

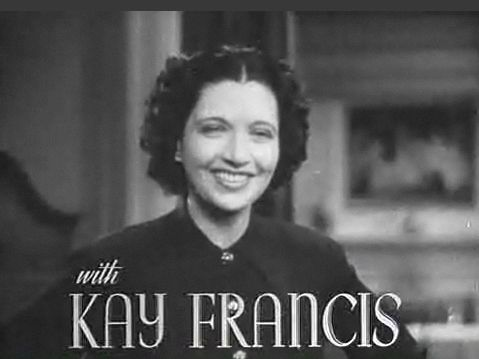
- Kay Francis in the film trailer
- Directed by: John Farrow
- Written by: Vincent Sherman
- Based on: Courage; 1928 play by Tom Barry
- Produced by: Bryan Foy
- Starring: Kay Francis; Bonita Granville
- Cinematography: Sidney Hickox
- Edited by: Frank Magee
- Music by: Howard Jackson (uncredited)
- Production company: Warner Bros. Pictures
- Distributed by: Warner Bros. Pictures
- Release date: July 9, 1938
- Running time: 60–65 minutes
- Country: United States
- Language: English

My Bill is a 1938 American drama film starring Kay Francis as a poor widow raising four children. It was based on the play Courage by Tom Barry.

== Plot ==
In the late 1930s, Mary Colbrook is the widow of Reginald Colbrook Sr. She has four children: Muriel, a young adult; teenagers Gwendolyn and Reginald Jr.; and, the youngest, Bill. Mary has financial difficulty in maintaining the home. Bill befriends Adelaide Crosby, an elderly woman, who considers Bill a nuisance after he accidentally broke her window with a thrown football. However, Bill's concern for Mrs. Crosby eventually endears him to her.

The late Reginald Sr.'s sister, "Aunt" Caroline Colbrook arrives. She criticizes Mary's parenting in front of the children, and says that Mary squandered her brother's money which resulted in their current financial strife. Caroline insists on the three oldest children living with her, insinuating that Bill is not her brother's son. Now angry with their mother, the three oldest children agree to live with Caroline who is more financially able to fulfill their desires. Caroline moves into Mary's house when Mary's lease expires and kicks Bill and Mary out. Bill and Mary take up residence with Mrs. Crosby.

Bill sells newspapers to help raise money for his mother, and is assisted by local banker, John C. Rudlin. Soon, Caroline's strict demands on the three oldest children cause them to have a change of heart. They write a letter to Mary asking for forgiveness. Mrs. Crosby dies, and leaves her entire estate to Bill. Bill is surprised Mrs. Crosby's estate includes not only her house, but also the house where his family lives. Bill returns to his home, now as its owner. Mary joins him and accepts her children's forgiveness.

Caroline returns, and it is revealed that Reginald Sr. was just as mean as his sister, and Mr. Rudlin was always Mary's true love. However, Mary remained loyal to her husband out of financial necessity; and, he fathered all four children. Rudlin says he still loves Mary. Caroline is kicked out of the house and the Colbrook family is restored.

== Cast ==
- Kay Francis as Mary Colbrook
- Dickie Moore as William "Bill" Colbrook
- Bonita Granville as Gwendolyn Colbrook
- John Litel as John C. Rudlin
- Anita Louise as Muriel Colbrook
- Bobby Jordan as Reginald Colbrook Jr.
- Maurice Murphy as Lynn Willard
- Elisabeth Risdon as Aunt Caroline Colbrook
- Helena Phillips Evans as Adelaide Crosby
- John Ridgely as Mr. Martin
- Sidney Bracey as Jenner (as Sidney Bracy)
- Bernice Pilot as Beulah
- Jan Holm as Miss Kelly

== Production ==
The film was based on a 1928 play by Tom Barry, called Courage. Warners had previously filmed it in 1930 under that title with Belle Bennett. The number of children in the play was eight; this was reduced to four.

It was the first movie Kay Francis made for Warners' B unit under Bryan Foy. Francis was being paid a high salary and Warners were keen for her to quit but she refused in order that she could still get her salary. She would make five films for him in all.

Vincent Sherman said he had to rewrite the script in only a few days – he was given the play on Thursday and he handed in a script on Monday.

John Farrow was attached to direct in March 1938. Farrow later said he directed Francis by polite but businesslike suggestions, Louise via picturesque comments that would amuse her and arouse her imagination, Granville needed encouragement and praise, and Bobby Jordan required occasional sarcasm.

== In popular culture ==
The film was popular enough to be adapted for radio on May 13, 1938, on a one-hour Hollywood Hotel, and on May 3, 1941 —featuring Francis, Warren William and, in the title role, Dix Davis— as a one-hour radio adaptation on Lux Radio Theatre.

== Reception ==
The Los Angeles Times called it "pure, unadulterated hokum" which "will get to you sure as blazes".
