= Frank Craven =

American actor (1875–1945)

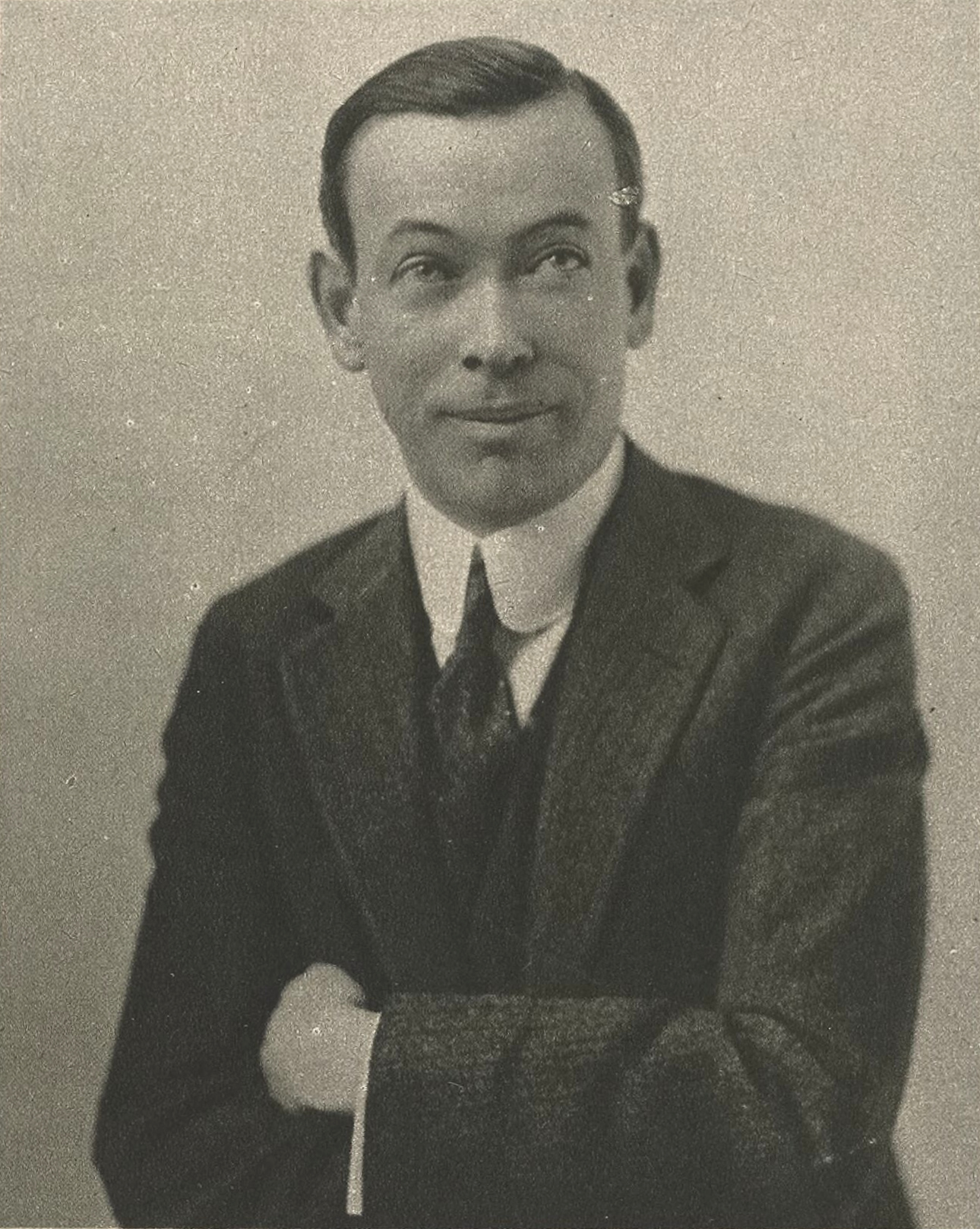
- Craven in 1921
- Born: August 24, 1875; Boston, Massachusetts, U.S.
- Died: September 1, 1945 (aged 70)
- Occupations: Actor, director, playwright, producer
- Years active: 1928–1945
- Spouse(s): Mazie B. Daly; Mary Blyth
- Children: John Craven

Frank Craven (August 24, 1875 – September 1, 1945) was an American stage and film actor, playwright, and screenwriter, best known for originating the role of the Stage Manager in Thornton Wilder's Our Town.

== Early years ==
Craven was born in Boston. His parents, John T. Craven and Ella Mayer Craven, were actors, and he first appeared on stage when he was three years old, in a child's part in The Silver King, in which his father was acting. His next appearance on stage occurred 13 years later in another production of the same play. That experience stirred an interest in acting as a career.

== Career ==
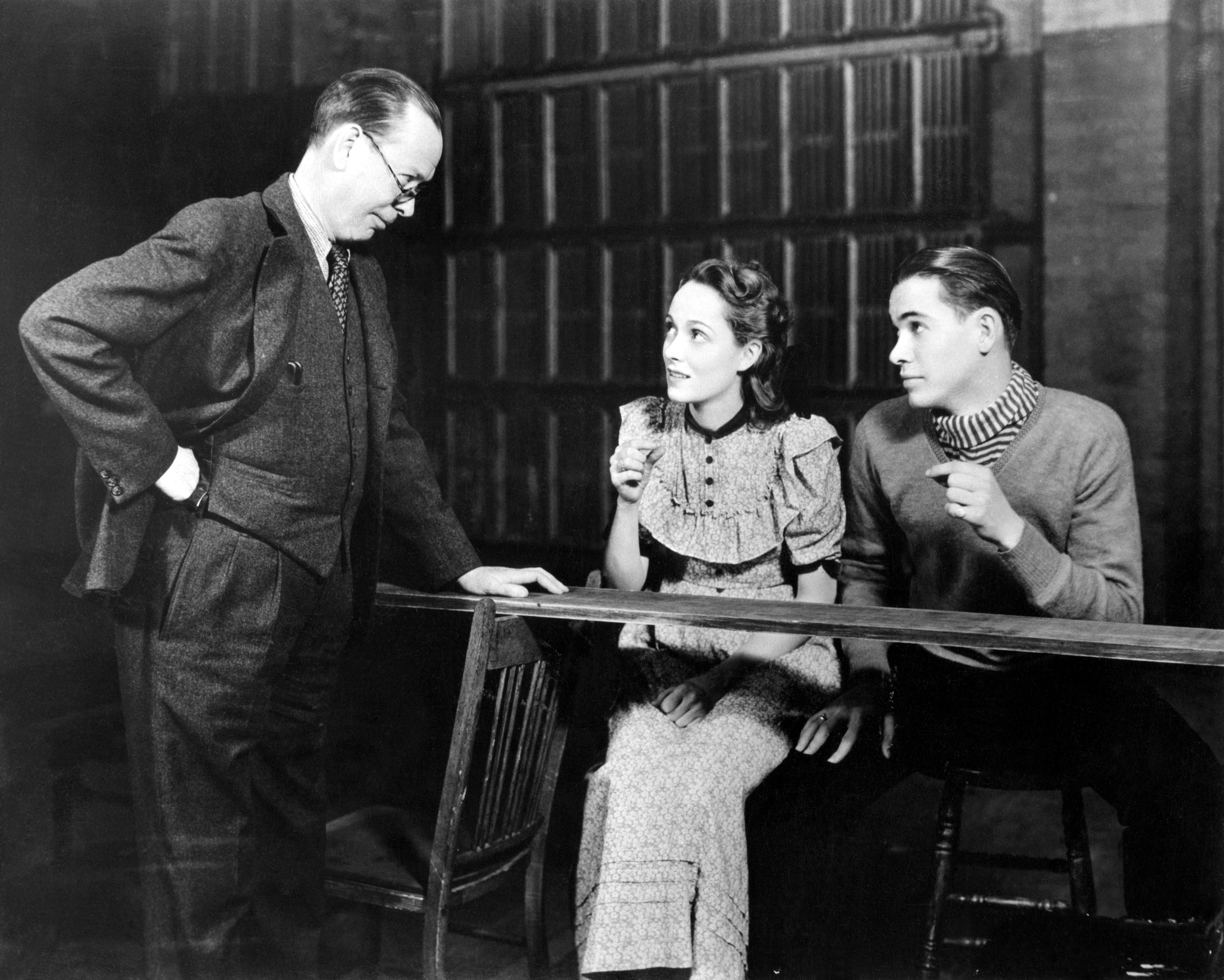
Frank Craven, Martha Scott and John Craven in the original Broadway production of Our Town (1938)

Before he acted in films, Craven worked in stage productions, not limiting his activity to acting. "I would do anything around the place," he said. He found later that work with carpentry, painting, and other backstage activities proved "invaluable" to him. His initial success in New York came in the role of James Gilley in Bought and Paid For (1911). He also played the same role in a production in London. He also was a playwright, penning hits such as Too Many Cooks (1914) and The First Year (1920).

Craven was a character actor who often portrayed wry, small-town figures. His first film role was in We Americans (1928), and he appeared in State Fair (1933), Penrod and Sam (1937), Jack London (1943), and Son of Dracula (1943), among many others.

He wrote numerous screenplays, most notably for the Laurel and Hardy film Sons of the Desert (1933).

In 1938, Craven played the Stage Manager in Our Town on Broadway, and reprised the role in the 1940 film version of the play, co-writing the screenplay. His son John Craven starred as George Gibbs in the stage version, a role played by William Holden in the 1940 film.

Craven was a Republican who campaigned for Thomas Dewey in the 1944 United States presidential election.

== Personal life and death ==
When he died, Craven was married to the former Mary Blyth, an actress. He had one son and one stepdaughter. He died at his home of a heart ailment in Beverly Hills, California, on September 1, 1945, shortly after finishing his work in Colonel Effingham's Raid.

== Filmography ==
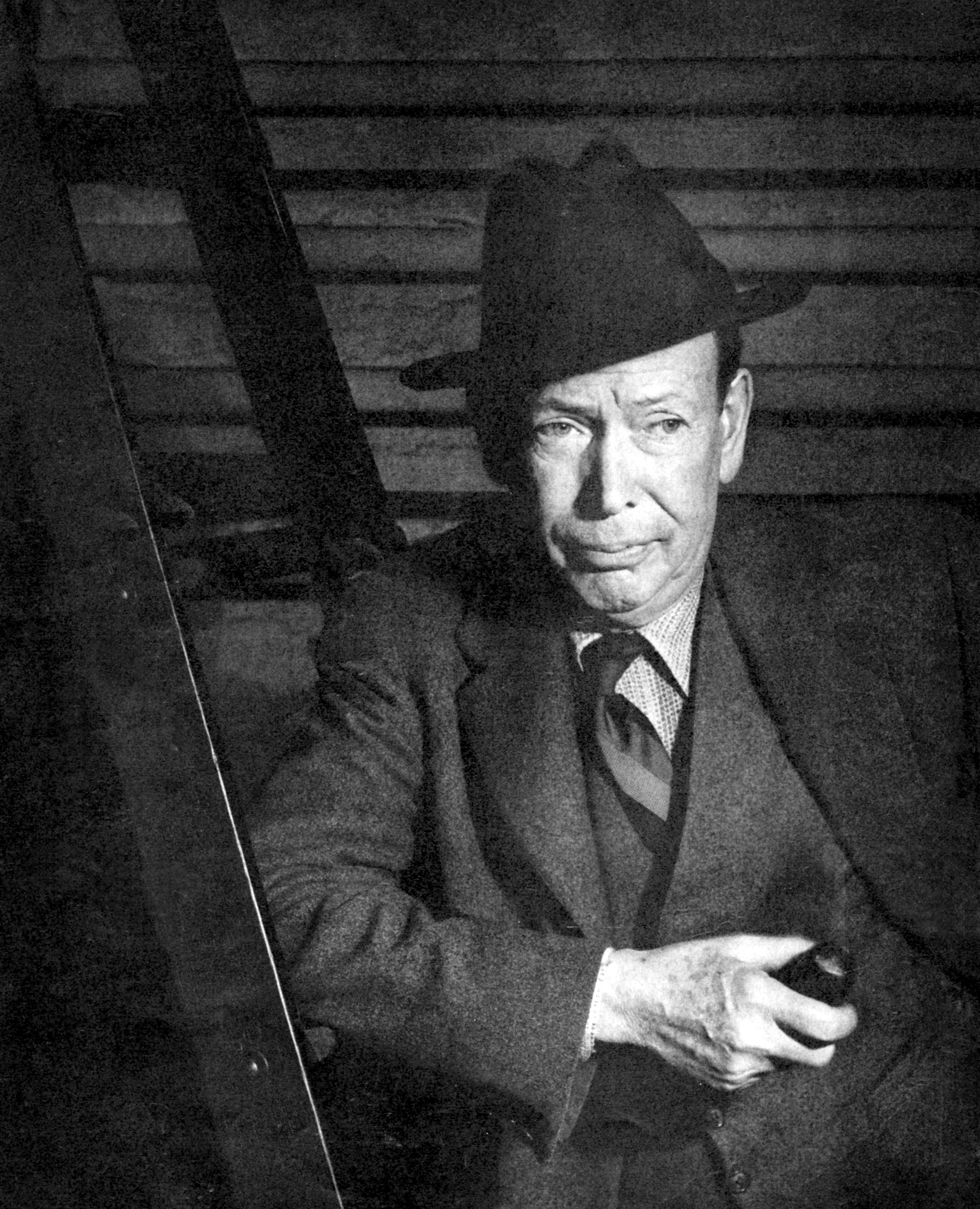
Frank Craven as the Stage Manager in the original Broadway production of Our Town (1938)

Year	Title	Role	Notes
1928	We Americans		Uncredited
1929	The Very Idea	Alan Camp	
1932	Handle with Care	Radio Announcer	
1933	State Fair	Storekeeper	
1934	City Limits	J.B. Matthews	
1934	He Was Her Man	Pop Sims, aka Jim Parker	
1934	Let's Talk It Over	Mr. Rockland	
1934	That's Gratitude	Bob Grant	
1935	Car 99	Sheriff Pete Arnot	
1935	Vagabond Lady	'Spiggy' Spiggins	
1935	Barbary Coast	Col. Marcus Aurelius Cobb	
1936	It's Up To You	Pop' Kane	
1936	Small Town Girl	Will 'Pa' Brannan	
1936	The Harvester	Mr. Biddle	
1937	Penrod and Sam	Mr. Schofield	
1937	Blossoms on Broadway	P.J. Quinterfield Sr.	
1937	You're Only Young Once	Frank Redmond (Carvel Newspaper Owner)	
1938	Penrod and His Twin Brother	Mr. Schofield	
1939	Miracles for Sale	Dad Morgan	
1939	Our Neighbors – The Carters	Doc Carter	
1940	Our Town	Mr. Morgan	
1940	City for Conquest	Old Timer	
1940	Dreaming Out Loud	Dr. Walter Barnes	
1941	The Lady from Cheyenne	Hank Foreman	
1941	The Richest Man In Town	Abb Crothers	
1942	In This Our Life	Asa Timberlake	
1942	Thru Different Eyes	Steve Pettijohn	
1942	Girl Trouble	Ambrose Murdock Flint	
1942	Pittsburgh	'Doc' Powers	
1942	Keeper of the Flame	Dr. Fielding	
1943	Harrigan's Kid	Walter Garnet	
1943	Dangerous Blondes	Inspector Joseph Clinton	
1943	Son of Dracula	Doctor Brewster	
1943	Jack London	Old Tom	
1944	My Best Gal	Danny O'Hara	
1944	Destiny	Clem Broderick	
1945	Forever Yours	Uncle Charles	
1946	Colonel Effingham's Raid	Dewey	(final film role)
