= By the Light of the Silvery Moon (film) =

1953 American musical film by David Butler

- Theatrical release poster
- Directed by: David Butler
- Written by: Booth Tarkington (Penrod stories)
- Screenplay by: Irving Elinson; Robert O'Brien
- Produced by: William Jacobs
- Starring: Doris Day; Gordon MacRae
- Cinematography: Wilfrid M. Cline
- Edited by: Irene Morra
- Music by: Gus Edwards (By the Light of the Silvery Moon); Max Steiner (music adapted by)
- Distributed by: Warner Bros. Pictures
- Release date: March 26, 1953
- Running time: 101 minutes
- Country: United States
- Language: English
- Box office: $2,125,000 (US)

By the Light of the Silvery Moon is a 1953 American musical film directed by David Butler and starring Doris Day and Gordon MacRae. As with the film's predecessor On Moonlight Bay, the film is based loosely on the Penrod stories by Booth Tarkington.

== Plot ==
The Winfield family lives in small-town Indiana as daughter Marjorie's boyfriend William Sherman returns from military duty in World War I. Their unstable romance provides the backdrop for other family crises, caused mainly by son Wesley's wild imagination.

== Cast ==
- Doris Day as Marjorie Winfield
- Gordon MacRae as William 'Bill' Sherman
- Billy Gray as Wesley Winfield
- Leon Ames as George Winfield
- Rosemary DeCamp as Alice Winfield
- Mary Wickes as Stella
- Russell Arms as Chester Finley
- Maria Palmer as Renee LaRue
- Howard Wendell as John H. Harris
- Walter Flannery as Ronald 'PeeWee' Harris

== Music ==
- "By the Light of the Silvery Moon"
- “Your Eyes Have Told Me So”
- “Just One Girl”
- "Ain't We Got Fun”
- “If You Were the Only Girl (In the World)”
- “Be My Little Baby Bumble Bee”
- “I’ll Forget You”
- “King Chanticleer”

== Reception ==
In a contemporary review for The New York Times, critic Bosley Crowther wrote: "Despite the obviousness of the humor and the conventionality of the small-town tone—achieved and directed by David Butler as though he were reading from a prop department catalogue—the singing of several old songs hits by Miss Day and Mr. MacRae is agreeably melodious. (We won't mention the anachronism of the songs.) ... As usual, the two young people have that musical comedy sparkle and splash that is utterly artificial but consistent with the sort of work they do. On one point, however, we will quibble: that is, when someone says, "Would you care to go to the Nickelodeon with me?" In 1919? Warner Brothers, for shame!"
