= Philip Hurlic =

American child actor (1927–2014)

- Born: Philip Raymond Hurlic; December 20, 1927; Los Angeles, California, U.S.
- Died: July 7, 2014 (aged 86); Compton, California, U.S.
- Occupation: Child actor
- Years active: 1932-1942

Philip Raymond Hurlic (December 20, 1927 – July 7, 2014) was an American child actor.

== Biography ==
Hurlic appeared in a number of films in the 1930s and early 1940s. Hurlic's income from his film work was used to support his East Los Angeles family. Hurlic's earliest roles were as a toddler in the Baby Burlesks series, which starred a pre-fame Shirley Temple. His largest roles in film include Little Jim in The Adventures of Tom Sawyer (1938), Verman Diggs in the Penrod films, and Zeke in Zenobia (1939), in which the 12 year old played one of the earliest positive roles for a Black male when he recited the Declaration of Independence from memory at the behest of co-star Oliver Hardy. He also appeared in a number of Our Gang comedies alongside another child actor from his neighborhood, Billie Thomas (Buckwheat).

He retired from film business in 1942 after 30 films. According to Hurlic's daughter Zee, Hurlic died peacefully on July 7, 2014, surrounded by his family.

== Filmography ==
Year	Title	Role	Notes
1935	Helldorado	Sam Ed	uncredited
1936	Hearts Divided	Pippin	
1936	The Green Pastures	Carlisle Randall	uncredited
1936	College Holiday	Black Baby Cupid	uncredited
1937	Penrod and Sam	Verman Diggs	
1937	Wings over Honolulu	Robert Lee	uncredited
1937	Nothing Sacred	One of Walker's Kids	uncredited
1938	The Adventures of Tom Sawyer	Little Jim	
1938	Penrod and His Twin Brother	Vermin	
1938	Jezebel	Erronens	uncredited
1938	Feed 'em and Weep	Our Gang Member	short
1938	Penrod's Double Trouble	Verman	
1938	Stablemates	Black Boy Bringing Uniform	uncredited
1939	Zenobia	Zeke	
1939	Cousin Wilbur	Buckwheat's Friend	short
1939	The Sun Never Sets	Tuppence - Native Boy	uncredited
1939	Chicken Wagon Family	Black Boy	uncredited
1939	Mr. Smith Goes to Washington	Boy Ranger	uncredited
1940	Young Tom Edison	Black Boy at Tree	uncredited
1941	Father's Son	Vestibule Pullman Montgomery	uncredited
1941	Golden Hoofs	Mose	
1942	Scattergood Rides High	Toby	
1942	Tales of Manhattan	Jeff	uncredited
