= Gentle Julia (1923 film) =

Silent film by Rowland V. Lee

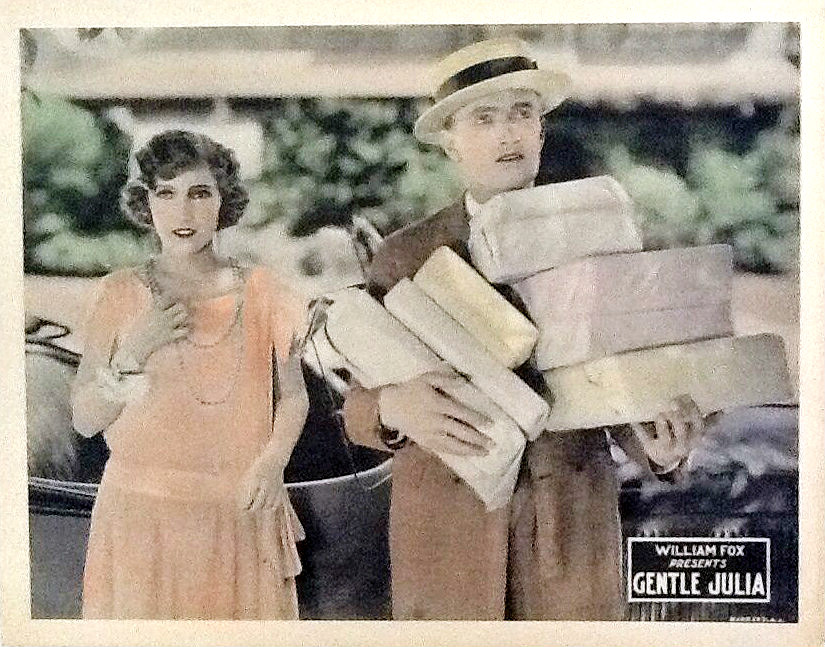
- Lobby card
- Directed by: Rowland V. Lee
- Written by: Donald W. Lee (adaptation, screenplay)
- Based on: Gentle Julia (novel) by Booth Tarkington
- Produced by: William Fox
- Starring: Bessie Love
- Cinematography: G.O. Post
- Distributed by: Fox Film Corporation
- Release date: December 24, 1923 (U.S.)
- Running time: 60 minutes; 6 reels (5,837 feet)
- Country: United States
- Language: Silent (English intertitles)

Gentle Julia is a 1923 American silent romantic drama film based on the popular novel Gentle Julia by Booth Tarkington. Directed by Rowland V. Lee, the film starred Bessie Love. It was produced and distributed by Fox Film Corporation, and is considered a lost film.

== Plot ==
Julia Atwater is the most popular girl in her Midwestern small town. She has many suitors, but she chooses an older man, Mr. Crum. When he takes her back to his home in Chicago, she finds out he is married. She leaves him, returning to neighbor Noble Dill.

== Cast ==
- Bessie Love as Julia Atwater
- Harold Goodwin as Noble Dill
- Frank Elliott as Randolph Crum
- Charles K. French as John Atwater
- Clyde Benson as George Atwater
- Harry Dunkinson as Uncle Joe Atwater
- Jack Rollens as Newland Sanders
- Frances Miller as Mrs. Joe Atwater (credited as Frances Grant)
- William Irving as George Plum
- Agnes Aker as Mrs. George Atwater
- William Berke as Herbert Atwater (credited as William Lester)
- Gypsy Norman as Mrs. Herbert Atwater
- Mary Arthur as Florence Atwater
- Richard Billings as Herbert Atwater Jr
- Frank Norcross as Uncle Charlie Patterson
- Emma Tansey as Aunt Fannie Patterson
- Harvey Clark as Ridgely
- Mde. Sul-Te-Wan as Kitty Silver
- Frank Farrington as Dill
- Virginia Johnson as Mrs. Dill
- Leslie Fenton (uncredited)

== Production ==
Love was cast because she was "the last girl in Hollywood with long hair", although she was unaware of this and got an "Eton crop" haircut before filming commenced.

== Reception ==
The film was well received. Love's performance drew mixed reviews, with some giving her praise, and others deeming her as miscast. Arthur's performance as the young niece drew rave reviews.

== See also ==
- 1937 Fox vault fire
