= Gentle Julia (1936 film) =

1936 film by John G. Blystone

- Directed by: John G. Blystone
- Written by: Lamar Trotti
- Based on: Gentle Julia by Booth Tarkington
- Produced by: Sol M. Wurtzel
- Starring: Jane Withers; Tom Brown; Marsha Hunt; Jackie Searl
- Cinematography: Ernest Palmer
- Edited by: Fred Allen
- Music by: Samuel Kaylin
- Production company: 20th Century Fox
- Distributed by: 20th Century Fox
- Release date: April 10, 1936
- Running time: 62 minutes
- Country: United States
- Language: English

Gentle Julia is a 1936 American drama film directed by John G. Blystone and starring Jane Withers, Tom Brown and Marsha Hunt. It is an adaptation of the 1922 novel of the same title by Booth Tarkington.

== Cast ==
- Jane Withers as Florence Atwater
- Tom Brown as Noble Dill
- Marsha Hunt as Julia Atwater
- Jackie Searl as Herbert Livingston Atwater
- Francis Ford as Tubbs, Fish Peddler
- George Meeker as Crum
- Maurice Murphy as Newland Sanders
- Harry Holman as Grandpa Atwater
- Myra Marsh as Mrs. Atwater
- Hattie McDaniel as Kitty Silvers
- Jackie Hughes as Henry Rooter
- Eddie Buzard as Wallie Torbin
- Frank Sully as Mr. Toms
- Mary Alden as Aunt
- Lynn Bari as Young Lady Outside Church / Jealous Girl at Dance
- Mary Carr as Old Lady at Dance
- Harvey Clark as Fat Man with Umbrella
- John Dilson as Uncle
- Grace Goodall as Aunt
- Roger Gray as Policeman
- Arthur Hoyt as Mr. Wainwright - Justice of the Peace
- Marcia Mae Jones as Patty Fairchild
- Jane Keckley as Neighbor at Dance
- Frederick Lee in a minor role
- Tom Ricketts as Old Man in Church / at Dance
- Cyril Ring as Neighbor at Dance
- Edwin Stanley as Mr. Atwater
- Paul Stanton as Minister
- Landers Stevens as Uncle
- Maidel Turner as Justice's Wife
- Hilda Vaughn as Telephone Operator
- Lois Verner as Choir Member
- Niles Welch as Book Salesman
- Florence Wix as Aunt Fannie

== Bibliography ==
- Goble, Alan. The Complete Index to Literary Sources in Film. Walter de Gruyter, 1999.
