= Penrod Jashber =

Book by Booth Tarkington

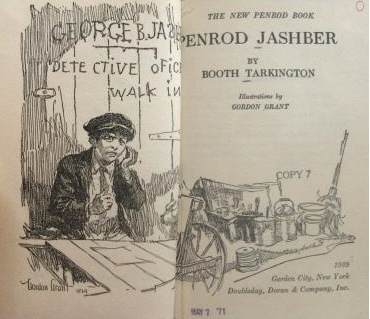
- Title page of first edition
- Author: Booth Tarkington
- Illustrator: Gordon Grant
- Language: English
- Genre: Novel
- Publisher: Doubleday, Doran & Co.
- Publication date: 1929
- Publication place: United States
- Media type: Print (Hardcover)
- Pages: 321 pages
- Preceded by: Penrod and Sam

Penrod Jashber is the third novel in a series by Booth Tarkington about the adventures of Penrod Schofield, an 11-year-old middle-class boy in a small city in the Midwest.

Initially serialized in Cosmopolitan and published in 1929, it was preceded by Penrod in 1914 and by Penrod and Sam in 1916. The three novels were published together as one volume, Penrod: His Complete Story, in 1931.

== Plot ==
Penrod Jashber is more novelistic in form than the preceding books; rather than each chapter standing as a separate story, the bulk of this book has one story arc, of Penrod's pretending to be detective George B. Jashber. Otherwise it is similar: it is written in the same style and takes place at the same time.

Penrod Jashber begins when Penrod's best friend Sam Williams acquires a new pup. The boys squabble about his name, the pup and Penrod's dog Duke rampage through Penrod's house, and as punishment Penrod's parents force him to wear a smelly asafetida bag. Penrod copes with this humiliation by telling tall tales of his exploits to his future girlfriend, lovely Marjorie Jones. Marjorie confesses that the reason she doesn't mind his "asafid'ty" bag is that her mother has made her wear one too. (The asafid'ty chapters are omitted from the 1931 complete edition.)

The detective story arc begins when Penrod further immerses himself in fantasy by penning a hilarious bandit epic starring George B. Jashber, the "notted detective." In the first Penrod book, he was hard at work on this picaresque adventure novel, with heroic road agent Harold Ramorez menaced by corrupt police detectives. Over time, he comes to see detectives as more interesting, skews the novel toward the exploits of Jashber, and decides to become one. Imitating his movie heroes, he squints his eyes and talks out of the side of his mouth. He paints an office sign in the (empty) stable and acquires an official-looking badge from the cook's nephew who took a mail-order course. To practice, he shadows his school teacher in the evenings.

Now adequately experienced, Penrod enlists Sam and the two Negro boys who live across the alley, Herman and Verman, as assistants. Needing a scoundrel to shadow, Penrod overhears his parents jocularly referring to the polished manners of Penrod's young-adult sister Margaret's boyfriend, Mr. Herbert Hamilton Dade, as being appropriate to a horse thief. The rest of the book concerns the increasingly desperate but futile efforts of Penrod and his gang to prove to themselves that Mr. Dade really does steal horses.

Their efforts are supported by Sam's older brother Robert, a rival for Margaret's affections. This support proves embarrassing when the boys' harassment of Mr. Dade finally sends the boys' fantasy world colliding with the dull reality of the adult world. Distressed by the exposure of his fantasy world, Penrod discards the now-alien persona of Jashber and dissolves the agency, and he and the other boys return to their childish occupations.
