= Hearts in Dixie =

1929 film by Paul Sloane

Hearts In Dixie
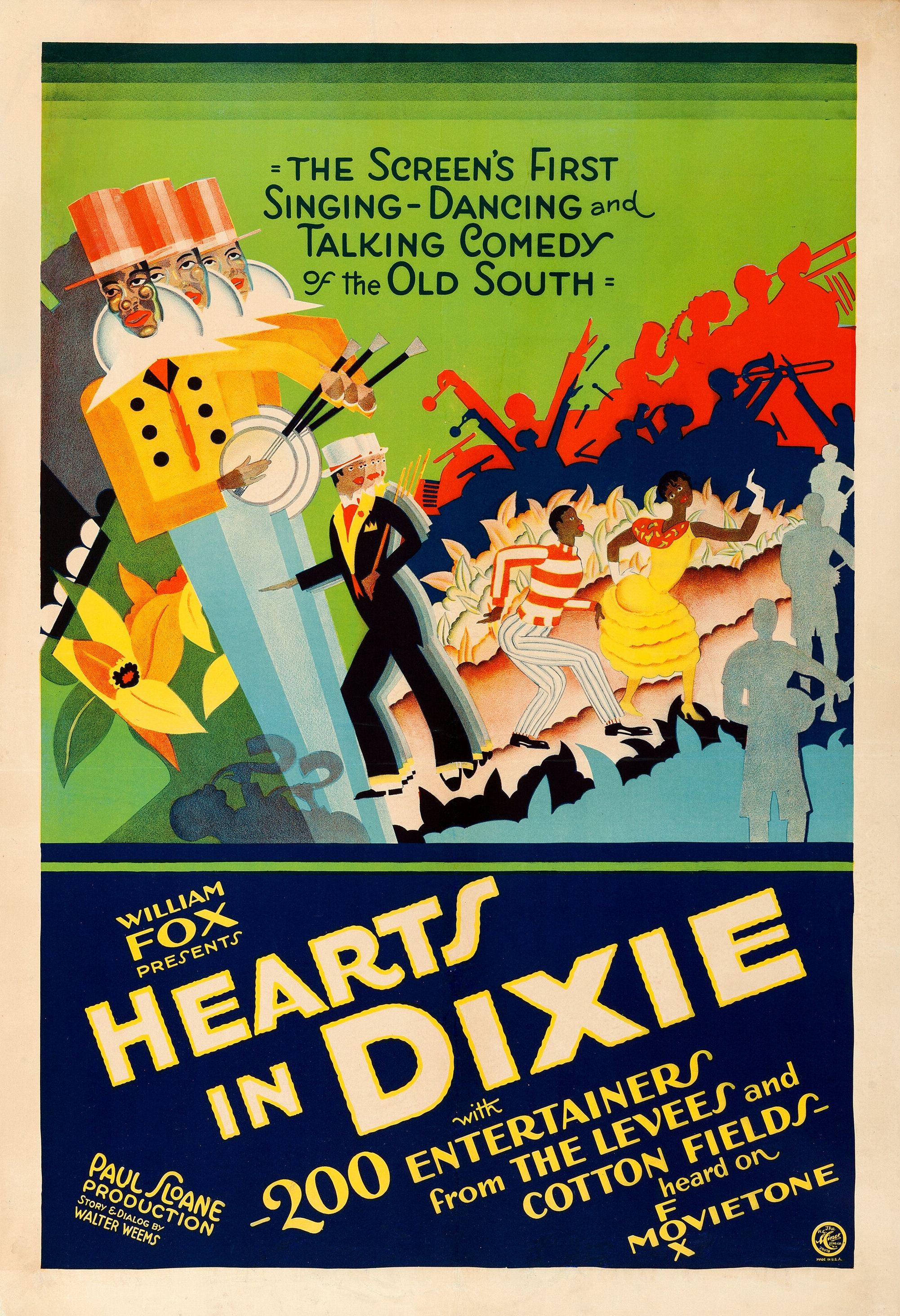
- Directed by: Paul Sloane
- Written by: Walter Weems
- Starring: Stepin Fetchit; Clarence Muse; Eugene Jackson; Bernice Pilot
- Distributed by: Fox Film Corporation
- Release date: March 10, 1929
- Running time: 71 minutes
- Country: United States
- Language: English

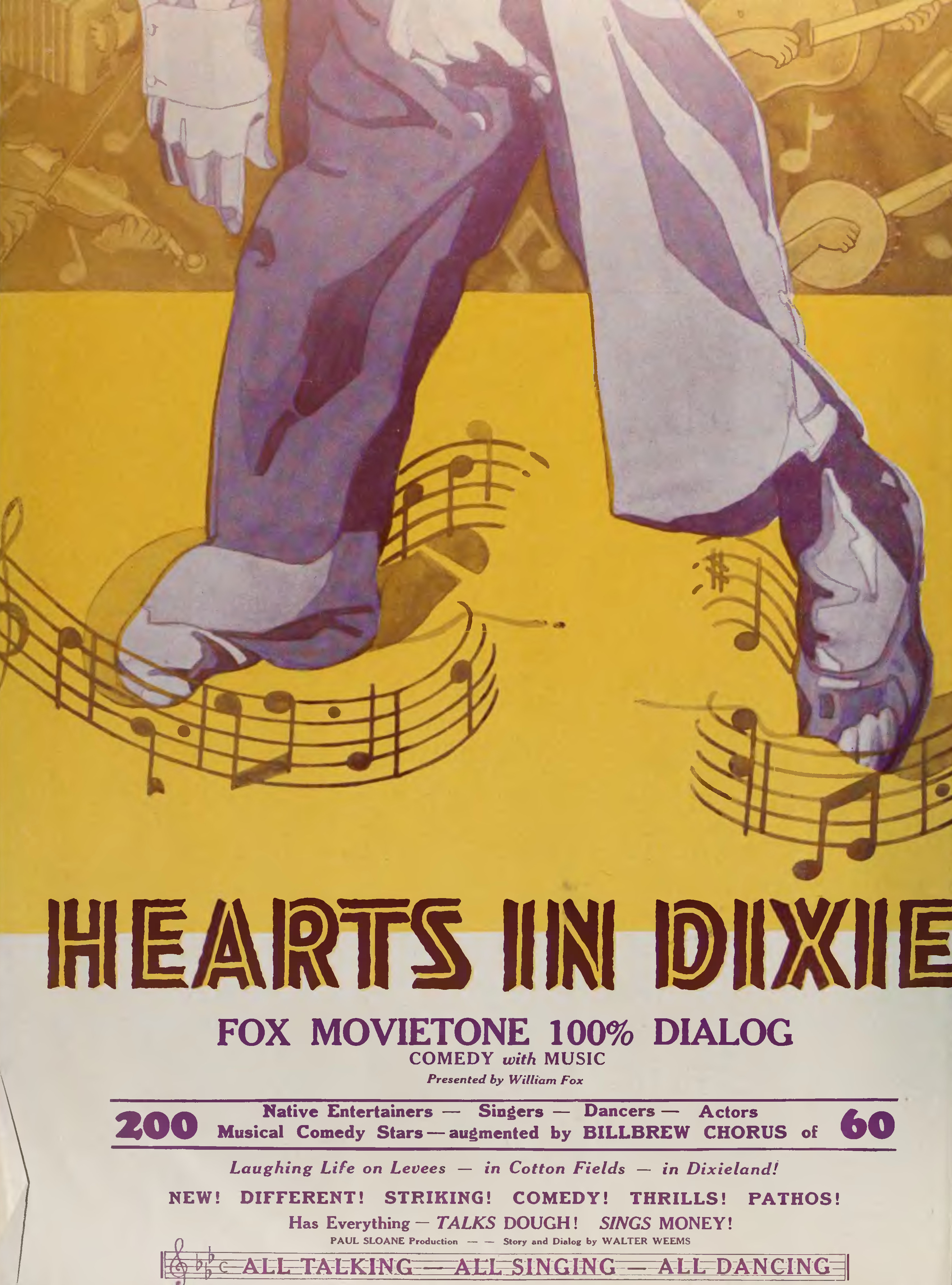
Ad from The Film Daily, 1929

Hearts in Dixie is a 1929 American pre-Code musical drama film starring Stepin Fetchit, was one of the first (all-talking) sound films, big-studio productions to boast a predominantly African-American cast. This film celebrates African-American music and dance. It was released by Fox Film Corporation just months before the release of Hallelujah!, another all-black musical released by competitor Metro-Goldwyn-Mayer. The director of Hearts in Dixie was Paul Sloane. Walter Weems wrote the screenplay, and William Fox was producer.

== Synopsis ==
The film has no overarching storyline, consisting of a series of unconnected scenes celebrating the advent of sound technology in the context of "black music".

Hearts in Dixie unfolds as a series of sketches of life among American blacks. Although the characters are not slaves, they are nevertheless racial stereotypes in terms of the contemporary white images of the period.

== Cast ==
- Stepin Fetchit as Gummy
- Clarence Muse as Nappus
- Eugene Jackson as Chinquapin
- Bernice Pilot as Chloe
- Clifford Ingram as Rammey
- Mildred Washington as Trallia
- Zack Williams as Deacon
- Gertrude Howard as Emmy
- Dorothy Morrison as Melia
- Vivian Smith as Violet
- A.C.H. Bilbrew as Voodoo Woman
- Richard Carlyle as White Doctor
- The Billbrew Chorus

== See also ==
- African-American representation in Hollywood
- List of early sound feature films (1926–1929)
