= Gentle Julia (novel) =

1922 novel by Booth Tarkington

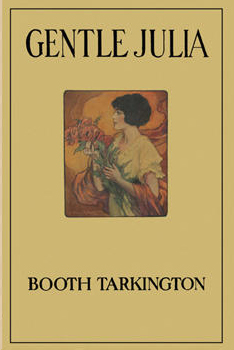
- First edition
- Author: Booth Tarkington
- Language: English
- Genre: Drama; Romance
- Publisher: Doubleday, Page & Company
- Publication date: 1922
- Publication place: United States
- Media type: Print

Gentle Julia is a 1922 novel by the American writer Booth Tarkington.

== Film adaptations ==
The novel has twice been adapted:

- Gentle Julia, a silent film directed by Rowland V. Lee
- Gentle Julia, a sound film directed by John G. Blystone

== Bibliography ==
- Goble, Alan. The Complete Index to Literary Sources in Film. Walter de Gruyter, 1999.
