= Penrod and Sam (1937 film) =

1937 film by William C. McGann

- Theatrical release poster
- Directed by: William C. McGann
- Screenplay by: Lillie Hayward; Hugh Cummings
- Based on: Penrod and Sam; 1916 novel by Booth Tarkington
- Produced by: Bryan Foy
- Starring: Billy Mauch; Frank Craven; Spring Byington; Craig Reynolds; Harry Watson; Jackie Morrow
- Cinematography: L. William O'Connell
- Edited by: Thomas Pratt
- Music by: Howard Jackson
- Production company: Warner Bros. Pictures
- Distributed by: Warner Bros. Pictures
- Release date: February 28, 1937
- Running time: 64 minutes
- Country: United States
- Language: English

Penrod and Sam is a 1937 drama film directed by William C. McGann and written by Lillie Hayward and Hugh Cummings. It was the third screen version of American writer Booth Tarkington's novel Penrod and Sam. The film stars Billy Mauch, Frank Craven, Spring Byington, Craig Reynolds, Harry Watson and Jackie Morrow. The film was released by Warner Bros. Pictures on February 28, 1937.

== Plot ==
Penrod Schofield and his gang are the Jr. G Men, a secret club where all members are sworn to uphold the law and turn in crooks. When the mother of the youngest member is killed by bank robbers, the boys go into action.

== Cast ==
- Billy Mauch as Penrod
- Frank Craven as Mr. Schofield
- Spring Byington as Mrs. Schofield
- Craig Reynolds as Roy 'Dude' Hanson
- Harry Watson as Sam
- Jackie Morrow as Rodney Bitts
- Philip Hurlic as Verman Diggs
- Charles Halton as Mr. Rodney H. Bitts
- Bernice Pilot as Delia
- Kenneth Harlan as Real G-Man
