= Penrod and Sam (1931 film) =

1931 film

- Directed by: William Beaudine
- Screenplay by: Waldemar Young
- Based on: Penrod and Sam; 1916 novel by Booth Tarkington
- Starring: Leon Janney; Frank Coghlan Jr. Billy Lord
- Cinematography: Roy Overbaugh
- Edited by: LeRoy Stone
- Production company: First National Pictures
- Distributed by: Warner Bros. Pictures, Inc.
- Release date: October 3, 1931
- Running time: 71 minutes
- Country: United States
- Language: English

Penrod and Sam is a 1931 American pre-Code comedy film directed by William Beaudine and starring Leon Janney and Frank Coghlan Jr. It is an adaptation of the novel Penrod and Sam by Booth Tarkington. Beaudine had previously directed a 1923 silent version, and was invited to remake his earlier success.

== Plot ==
Penrod Schofield and Sam Williams are good friends and founding members of the In-Or-In boy's club. Penrod is perpetually in trouble at school and in the neighborhood because of the pranks he plays. Georgie Bassett and Rodney Bitts, two other boys at school, are always complaining to adults about Penrod and Sam, so the boys will not allow them into their club. When Georgie's father, Mr. Bassett, tells this to Penrod's father, Henry Schofield, Mr. Schofield insists that the boys invite Georgie to join their club. Having been forced into accepting Georgie, they decide to make his initiation especially unpleasant. Rodney, who also dislikes the boys, then pretends that Penrod and Sam harmed him, and the two boys are unfairly punished. Meanwhile, Penrod and Sam argue over a girl, Marjorie Jones, whom they both like, and Penrod's dog, Duke, is run over by a car. Penrod hits his lowest period when Penrod's father sells the empty lot where the clubhouse is located to Mr. Bitts, who throws the boys off the land. Out of revenge, Rodney even refuses to allow Penrod to visit Duke's grave next to the clubhouse. When he realizes how much the lot means to Penrod, Mr. Schofield buys the land back from Mr. Bitts, and having learned his lesson, Penrod makes up with Sam and invites Rodney to join the club.

== Cast ==
- Leon Janney as Penrod
- Frank Coghlan Jr. as Sam
- Margaret Marquis as Marjorie Jones
- Billy Lord as Georgie Bassett
- Michael Stuart as Rodney Bitts
- Jimmy Robinson as Herman Washington
- Robert Dandridge as Verman Washington
- Matt Moore as Henry Schofield
- Dorothy Peterson as Mrs. Schofield
- Helen Beaudine as Margaret Schofield
- Johnny Arthur as Mr. Bassett
- ZaSu Pitts as Mrs. Bassett
- Charles Sellon as Mr. Bitts

== Preservation status ==
This film as well as a 1923 silent and the 1936 update are all preserved in the Library of Congress collection.

== Bibliography ==
- Marshall, Wendy L. William Beaudine: From Silents to Television. Scarecrow Press, 2005.
