= Penrod and Sam (1923 film) =

1923 film by William Beaudine

- The film
- Directed by: William Beaudine
- Screenplay by: Louis D. Lighton; Hope Loring
- Based on: Penrod and Sam; 1916 novel by Booth Tarkington
- Produced by: J. K. McDonald
- Starring: Ben Alexander; Joe Butterworth; Buddy Messinger
- Cinematography: Ray June; Edward Ullman
- Edited by: Edward M. McDermott
- Distributed by: Associated First National Pictures
- Release date: June 18, 1923
- Running time: 1 hour, 24 minutes
- Country: United States
- Language: Silent (English intertitles)

Penrod and Sam is a 1923 American silent comedy drama film directed by William Beaudine and starring Ben Alexander, Joe Butterworth, and Buddy Messinger. Wendy L. Marshall stated that "Beaudine had the Midas touch when it came to directing children" in films like this and Boy of Mine. In 1931, Beaudine directed a sound adaptation of the novel.

== Cast ==
- Ben Alexander as Penrod Schofield
- Joe Butterworth as Sam Williams
- Buddy Messinger as Rodney Bitts
- Newton Hall as Georgie Bassett
- Gertrude Messinger as Marjorie Jones
- Joe McGray as Herman
- Eugene Jackson as Verman
- Rockliffe Fellowes as Mr. Schofield
- Gladys Brockwell as Mrs. Schofield
- Mary Philbin as Margaret Schofield

== Preservation ==
Prints of Penrod and Sam are in the collections of the Library of Congress and EYE Film Institute Netherlands.
