= Penrod and Sam (novel) =

1916 novel by Booth Tarkington

- First edition
- Author: Booth Tarkington
- Language: English
- Publisher: Doubleday Page & Co
- Publication date: 1916
- Publication place: United States
- Media type: Print (hardcover)
- Preceded by: Penrod
- Followed by: Penrod Jashber

Penrod and Sam is a novel by Booth Tarkington that was first published in 1916. it is set pre-World War I. This is a sequel to his earlier book Penrod, and focuses more on the relationship between the main character of the previous book, Penrod Schofield, and his best friend, Sam Williams. More of Penrod's adventures appear in the final book of the series Penrod Jashber (1929). The three books were published together in one volume, Penrod: His Complete Story, in 1931.

== Plotlines ==
- Chapters 1-2: Penrod and his friends are playing their version of war games, but one "prisoner" is forgotten and his place of captivity may prove embarrassing.
- Chapters 3-4: Penrod and Sam learn the hard way about the dangers of playing with real and loaded guns.
- Chapters 5-6: The local boys form their own "secret society", but Georgie Bassett, "The Best Boy in Town" (and therefore not popular with the other boys) wants to become a member and the grown-ups are insistent about it.
- Chapters 7-9: Penrod and Sam find a stray horse and decide to keep him for any possible reward.
- Chapters 10-11: Penrod's mother goes overboard when she thinks he's sick.
- Chapters 12-14: Penrod's dog Duke's fight with an extremely vicious cat leads the boys to start their own motion picture project to be set in a jungle.
- Chapters 15-16: A school assignment concerning "a letter to a friend" proves embarrassing to Penrod when he uses a letter from his sister to her boyfriend (without reading it himself first).
- Chapter 17: After his sister embarrasses him in church, Penrod tries to find a way to get even.
- Chapters 18-20: When Penrod can't find anything to keep himself occupied, an overheard conversation leads to a creation that is destined to get him into trouble.
- Chapters 21-22: Penrod's ambition to become a horn player leads to the involvement of a valuable antique.
- Chapters 23-24: It's Amy "Baby" Rennsdale's ninth birthday, and Penrod and Sam are invited, but the inclusion of a practical joker among the party guests leads not only to a catastrophe but also to a wonderful revelation.

== Film adaptations ==
Penrod and Sam was the most popular of Tarkington's Penrod series among film makers, with three separate adaptations eventually being produced:

- Penrod and Sam (1923 film), with Ben Alexander as Penrod.
- Penrod and Sam (1931 film), with Leon Janney as Penrod.
- Penrod and Sam (1937 film), with Billy Mauch as Penrod.
