= Booth Tarkington =

American novelist (1869–1946)

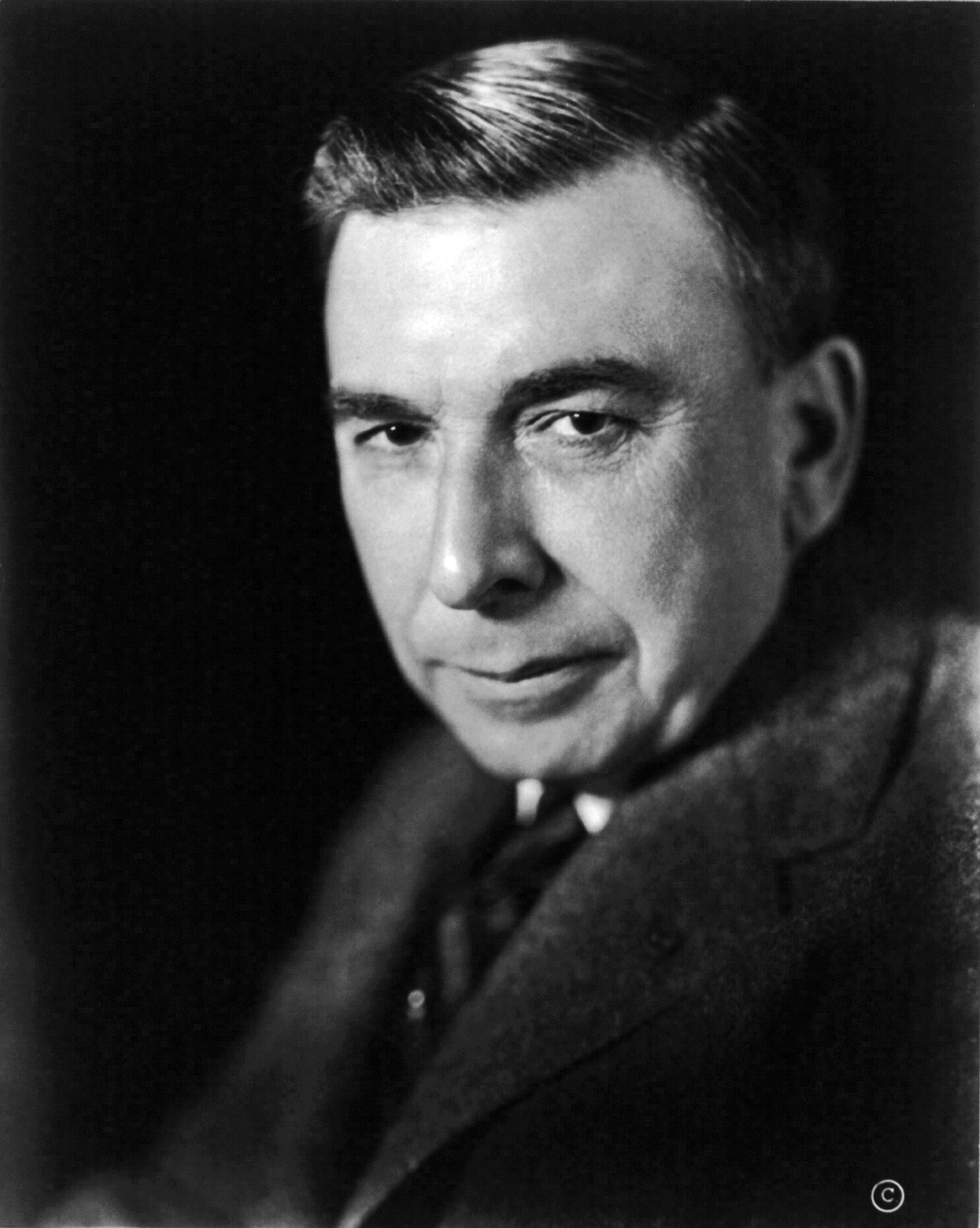
- Tarkington in 1922
- Born: Newton Booth Tarkington; July 29, 1869; Indianapolis, Indiana, U.S.
- Died: May 19, 1946 (aged 76); Indianapolis, Indiana, U.S.
- Resting place: Crown Hill Cemetery and Arboretum, Section 13, Lot 56 39.8188341°N 86.1757734°W
- Education: Purdue University; Princeton University
- Occupations: Novelist, dramatist
- Spouses: Louisa Fletcher (m. 1902; div. 1911) Susanah Keifer Robinson (m. 1912)
- Children: 1
- Writing career
- Years active: 1899–1946
- Notable works: Penrod (1914); The Magnificent Ambersons (1918); Alice Adams (1921)
- Notable awards: Pulitzer Prize for Fiction (1919, 1922)

Signature
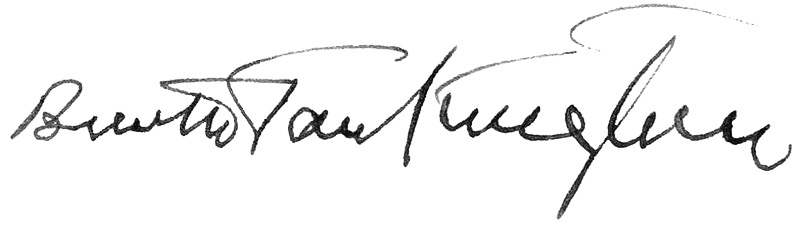

Newton Booth Tarkington (July 29, 1869 – May 19, 1946) was an American novelist and dramatist best known for his novels The Magnificent Ambersons (1918) and Alice Adams (1921). He is one of only four novelists to win the Pulitzer Prize for Fiction more than once, along with William Faulkner, John Updike, and Colson Whitehead. In the 1910s and 1920s he was considered the greatest living author in the United States. Several of his stories were adapted to film.

During the first quarter of the 20th century, Tarkington, along with Meredith Nicholson, George Ade, Gene Stratton-Porter and James Whitcomb Riley helped create a Golden Age of literature in Indiana.

Tarkington served one term in the Indiana House of Representatives, was critical of the advent of automobiles, and set many of his stories in the Midwest. He eventually moved to Kennebunkport, Maine, where he continued to work even as he suffered a loss of vision.

He is often cited as an example of an author who enjoyed great success when alive, but whose reputation and influence did not survive his death.

== Early life and education ==
Tarkington was born in Indianapolis, Indiana, on July 29, 1869, the son of John S. Tarkington, a judge, and Elizabeth Booth Tarkington. He came from a patrician Midwestern family that had lost much of its wealth after the Panic of 1873. Tarkington was named after his maternal uncle Newton Booth, then the governor of California. He was also related to Chicago Mayor James Hutchinson Woodworth through Woodworth's wife, Almyra Booth Woodworth.

Tarkington attended Shortridge High School in Indianapolis, and completed his secondary education at Phillips Exeter Academy, a boarding school in New Hampshire. For two years he attended Purdue University, where he was a member of the Sigma Chi fraternity and the university's Morley Eating Club.

Some of his family's wealth returned after the Panic of 1873, and his mother transferred Booth from Purdue to Princeton University. At Princeton, Tarkington is said to have been known as "Tark" among the members of the Ivy Club, the first of Princeton's historic eating clubs. He had also been in a short-lived eating club called "Ye Plug and Ulster", which became Colonial Club. He was active as an actor and served as president of Princeton's Dramatic Association, which later became the Triangle Club, of which he was a founding member.

Tarkington made his first acting appearance in the club's Shakespearean spoof Katherine, one of the first three productions in the Triangle's history written and produced by students. Tarkington established the Triangle tradition, still alive as of 2014, of producing students' plays. He returned to the Triangle stage as Cassius in the 1893 production of a play he co-authored, The Honorable Julius Caesar. He edited Princeton's Nassau Literary Magazine, known more recently as The Nassau Lit. He socialized with Woodrow Wilson, an associate graduate member of the Ivy Club. Wilson returned to Princeton as a member of the political science faculty shortly before Tarkington departed; they maintained contact throughout Wilson's life. Tarkington failed to earn his undergraduate A.B. because he missed a single course in classics. But his place within campus society was already determined, and he was voted "most popular" by the class of 1893.

== Career ==
Tarkington's first successful novel was The Gentleman from Indiana (1899). In 1902–1903, he served one term as a Republican member of the Indiana House of Representatives, an experience reflected in his 1905 short story collection In The Arena.

As a novelist, Tarkington was both prolific and commercially successful. Between 1914 and 1928, seven of his novels ranked among the top ten best-selling books of the year: Penrod (1914), The Turmoil (#1 best seller of 1915), Seventeen (#1 best seller of 1916), Gentle Julia (1922), The Midlander (1924), The Plutocrat (1927) and Claire Ambler (1928). He produced both of his Pulitzer Prize-winning novels during the same period.

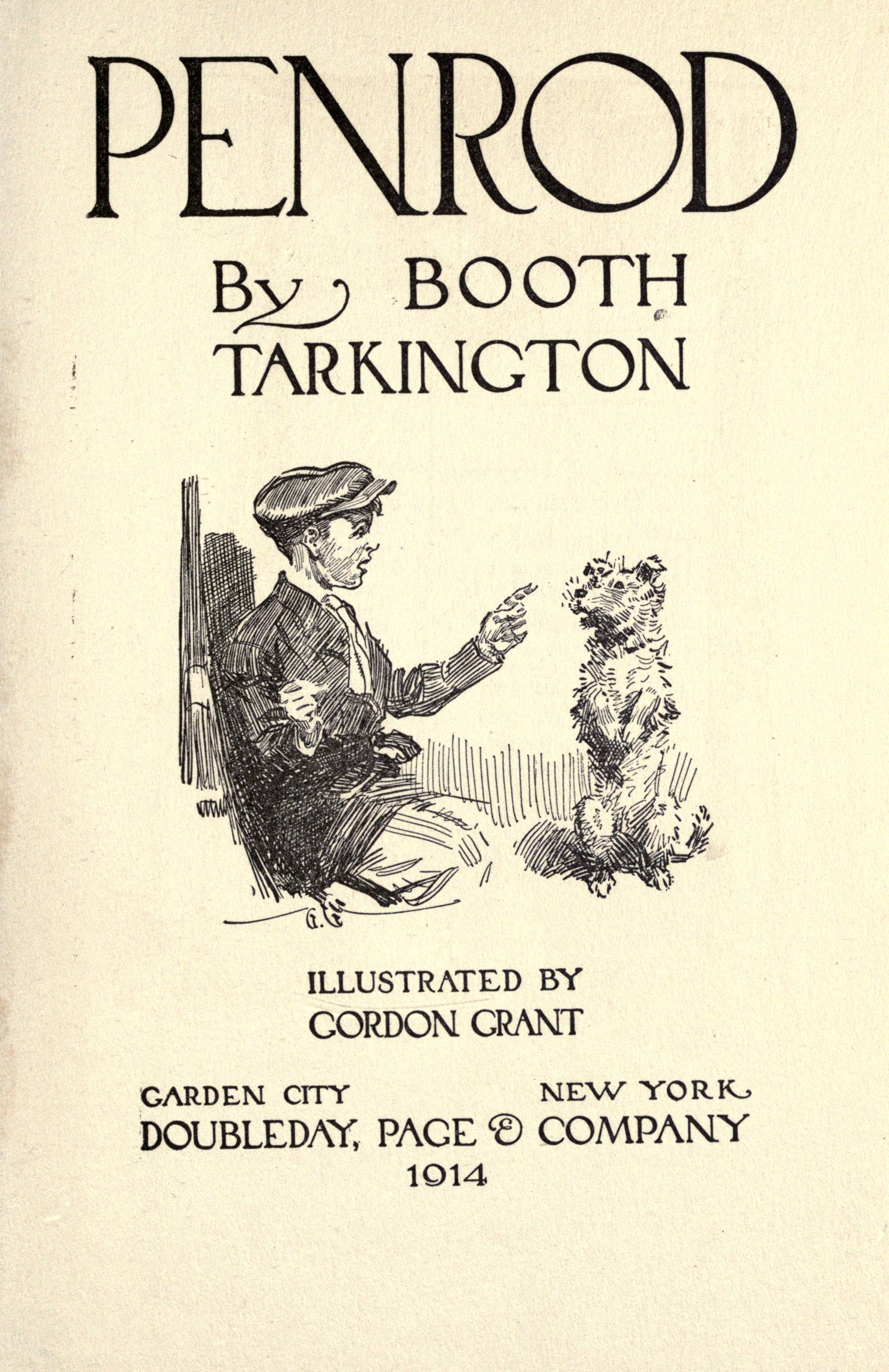
Cover page for Penrod, depicting Penrod Schofield and his dog Duke (1914)

Two of his novels achieved longer-term commercial success. Penrod was one of a select group of novels that sold more than 750,000 copies between 1895 and 1975, according to Publishers Weekly sales data. Seventeen, a coming-of-age story, sold some 1.7 million copies during the 1895–1975 period. Although written for an adult audience, it came to be regarded as a children's book and was one of the era's best-selling books in that category.

The Two Vanrevels and Mary's Neck appeared on the annual best-seller lists nine times.

Tarkington wrote 25 plays, including three collaborations with Harry Leon Wilson. Some of the plays dramatized his novels. Some were eventually filmed, including Monsieur Beaucaire, Presenting Lily Mars, and The Adventures and Emotions of Edgar Pomeroy, made into a serialized film in 1920 and 1921. In 1928, he published a book of reminiscences, The World Does Move.

== Themes ==
Tarkington was an unabashed Midwestern regionalist and set much of his fiction in his native Indiana. His style has been compared to that of Mark Twain and William Dean Howells.

Much of Tarkington's work consists of satirical and closely observed studies of the American class system and its foibles. Themes of the nouveau riche and upward social mobility recur in his books.

== Awards and recognition ==
=== Literary ===
Tarkington received many awards recognizing and honoring his accomplishments as an author. He won the Pulitzer Prize for Fiction twice, in 1919 and 1922, for his novels The Magnificent Ambersons and Alice Adams.

Other achievements include:

- Booksellers rated him "the most significant contemporary American author" in a 1921 poll by Publishers Weekly. In 1922, The Literary Digest called him America's greatest living author, and The New York Times selected him as one of the 10 greatest living Americans.
- He won the O. Henry Memorial Award in 1931 for his short story "Cider of Normandy".
- He was awarded the National Institute of Arts and Letters Gold Medal in 1933.
- The Magnificent Ambersons, which Orson Welles filmed in 1942, is included in the Modern Library's list of the 100 best novels.

=== Honorary ===
Tarkington's honorary degrees included an A.M. and a Litt.D. from Princeton, and honorary doctorates from Columbia University and Purdue. He made substantial donations to Purdue for building an all-men's residence hall, which the university named Tarkington Hall in his honor.

== Personal life ==
Tarkington was married to Laura Louisa Fletcher from 1902 until their divorce in 1911. Their only child, Laurel, was born in 1906 and died in 1923. Fletcher, a published poet, was involved in adapting his fiction for the stage. Her prosperous Indiana banking family is thought to be the model for certain characters in Tarkington's writing.

Tarkington's second marriage was to Susanah Keifer Robinson in 1912. They had no children.

Tarkington began losing his eyesight in the 1920s. He continued to write by dictating to his secretary Elizabeth Trotter. Despite his failing eyesight, between 1928 and 1940 he edited several historical novels by his Kennebunkport, Maine, neighbor Kenneth Roberts, who described Tarkington as a "co-author" of his later books and dedicated three of them (Rabble in Arms, Northwest Passage, and Oliver Wiswell) to him.

Tarkington underwent eye surgery in February 1929. In August 1930, he suffered complete loss of eyesight and was rushed from Maine to Baltimore for surgery on his right eye. He had an additional two operations in 1930. In 1931, after five months of blindness, he underwent a fifth and final operation. The surgery significantly restored his eyesight, but his physical energy was diminished for the remainder of his life.

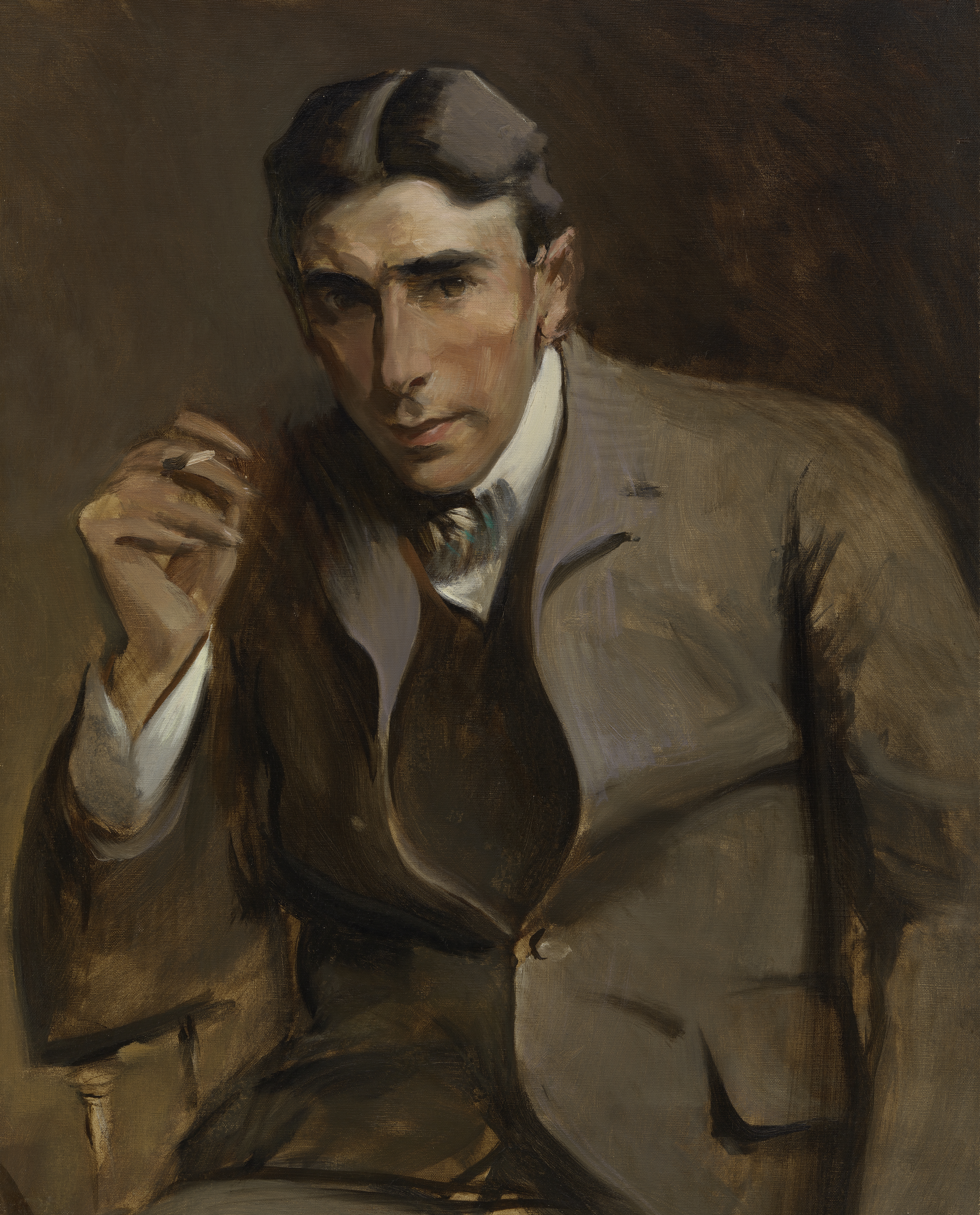
Newton Booth Tarkington by 19th-20th century artist John White Alexander

Tarkington maintained a home at 4270 North Meridian Street in Indianapolis. From 1923 until his death, he spent summers and then much of his later life in Kennebunkport at his much loved home, Seawood. In Kennebunkport, he was well known as a sailor, and his schooner, the Regina, survived him. Regina was moored next to Tarkington's boathouse, The Floats, which he also used as his studio. His extensively renovated studio is now the Kennebunkport Maritime Museum. From his home in Maine, he and his wife established a relation with nearby Colby College.

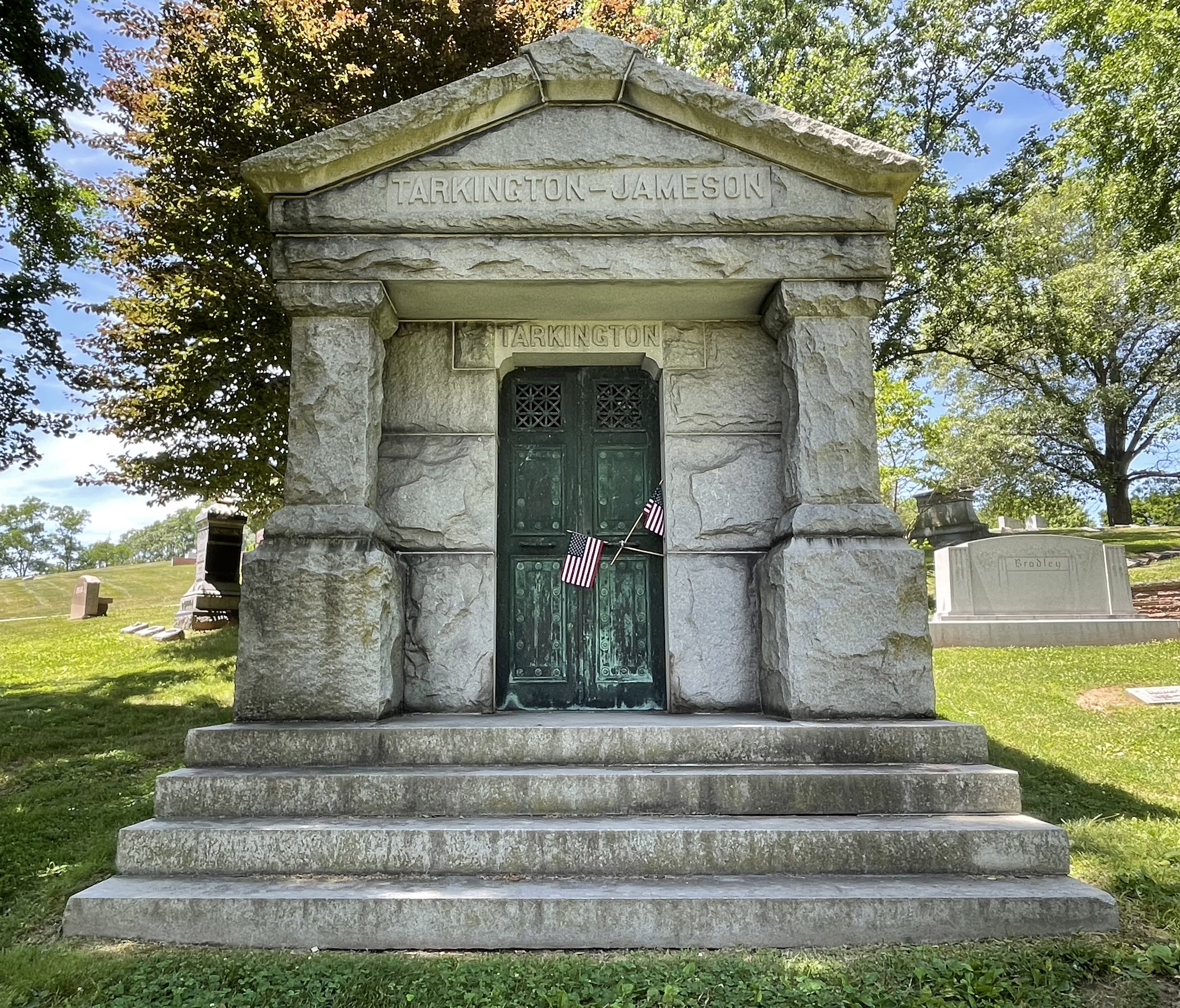
Tarkington is interred in the Tarkington-Jameson mausoleum at Crown Hill Cemetery in Indianapolis, Indiana.

Tarkington took a close interest in fine art and collectibles and was a trustee of the John Herron Art Institute. He made a gift of some his papers to Princeton, his alma mater, and his wife Susannah, who survived him by over 20 years, made a separate gift of his remaining papers to Colby College after his death. Purdue University's library holds many of his works in its Special Collection's Indiana Collection. Indianapolis commemorates his impact on literature and the theatre, and his contributions as a Midwesterner and "son of Indiana" in its Booth Tarkington Civic Theatre.

Tarkington died on May 19, 1946, aged 76, in his home in Indianapolis. He was buried in Crown Hill Cemetery.

== Legacy ==
In the 1910s and 1920s, Tarkington was regarded as "the most important and lasting writer of his generation", perhaps as important as Mark Twain. His works were reprinted many times, were often on best-seller lists, won many prizes, and were adapted into other media. Penrod and its two sequels were regular birthday presents for bookish boys.

But by the later 20th century, Tarkington was ignored in academia: there were no congresses, no society, no journal of Tarkington Studies. In 1981, The Avenue (Penguin) Companion to English and American Literature called Tarkington "the epitome of the middle-brow American novelist." In 1985, he was cited as an example of the great discrepancy possible between an author's fame when alive and oblivion later. According to this view, if an author succeeds at pleasing his or her contemporaries—and Tarkington's works have not a whiff of social criticism—they will not please later readers of inevitably different values and concerns.

In 2004, author and critic Thomas Mallon wrote: "Entirely absent from most current histories of American writing, Tarkington was generally scorned by those published just before or after his death."

In 2019, Robert Gottlieb wrote that Tarkington "dwindled into America's most distinguished hack." Gottlieb criticized Tarkington's anti-modernist perspective, "his deeply rooted, unappeasable need to look longingly backward, an impulse that goes beyond nostalgia," for preventing him from "producing so little of real substance."

Mallon wrote of Tarkington, "only general ignorance of his work has kept him from being pressed into contemporary service as a literary environmentalist—not just a 'conservationist,' in the [Theodore Roosevelt] mode, but an emerald-Green decrier of internal combustion":

The automobile, whose production was centered in Indianapolis before World War I, became the snorting, belching villain that, along with soft coal, laid waste to Tarkington's Edens. His objections to the auto were aesthetic—in The Midlander (1923) automobiles sweep away the more beautifully named "phaetons" and "surreys"—but also something far beyond that. Dreiser, his exact Indiana contemporary, might look at the Model T and see wage slaves in need of unions and sit-down strikes; Tarkington saw pollution, and a filthy tampering with human nature itself. "No one could have dreamed that our town was to be utterly destroyed," he wrote in The World Does Move. His important novels are all marked by the soul-killing effects of smoke and asphalt and speed, and even in Seventeen, Willie Baxter fantasizes about winning Miss Pratt by the rescue of precious little Flopit from an automobile's rushing wheels.

In June 2019, the Library of America published Booth Tarkington: Novels & Stories, collecting The Magnificent Ambersons, Alice Adams, and In the Arena: Stories of Political Life.

== Works ==
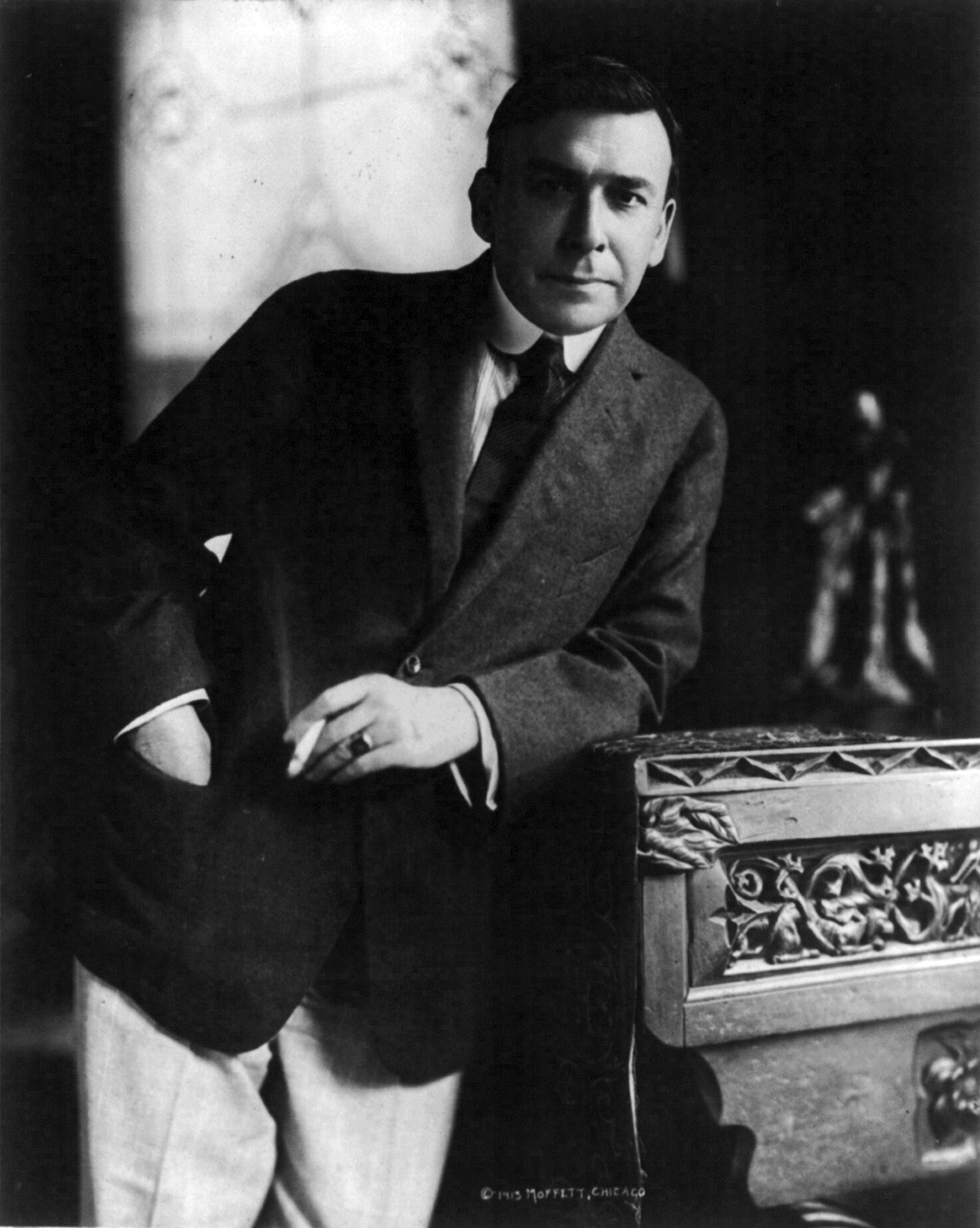
Booth Tarkington in 1913

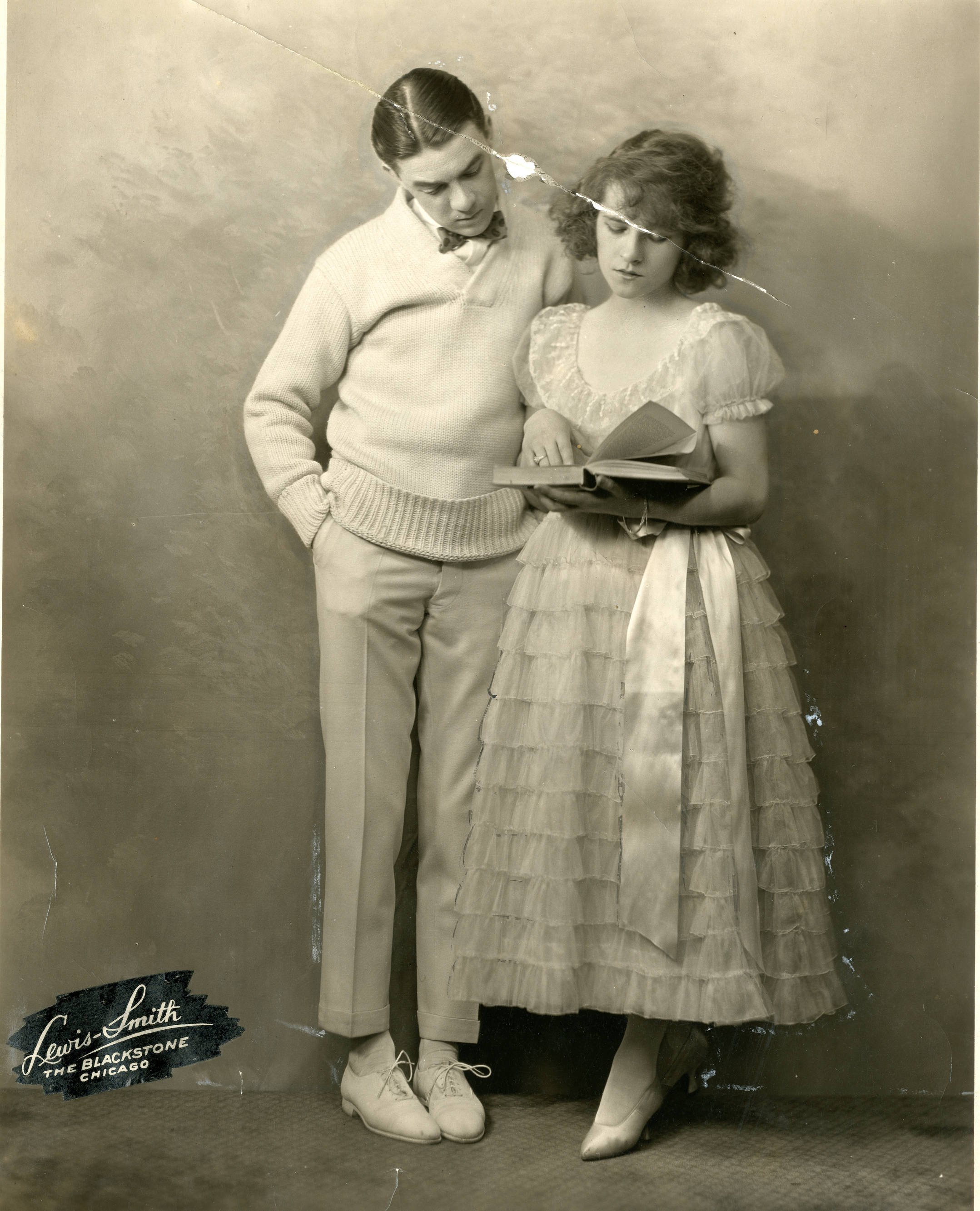
Gregory Kelly and Ruth Gordon in Tarkington's 1919 play Clarence

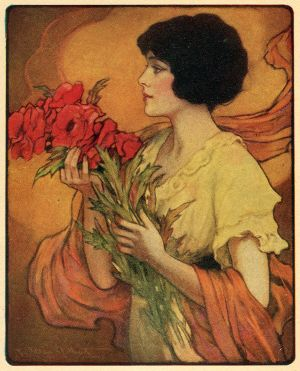
Frontispiece of Gentle Julia (1922)

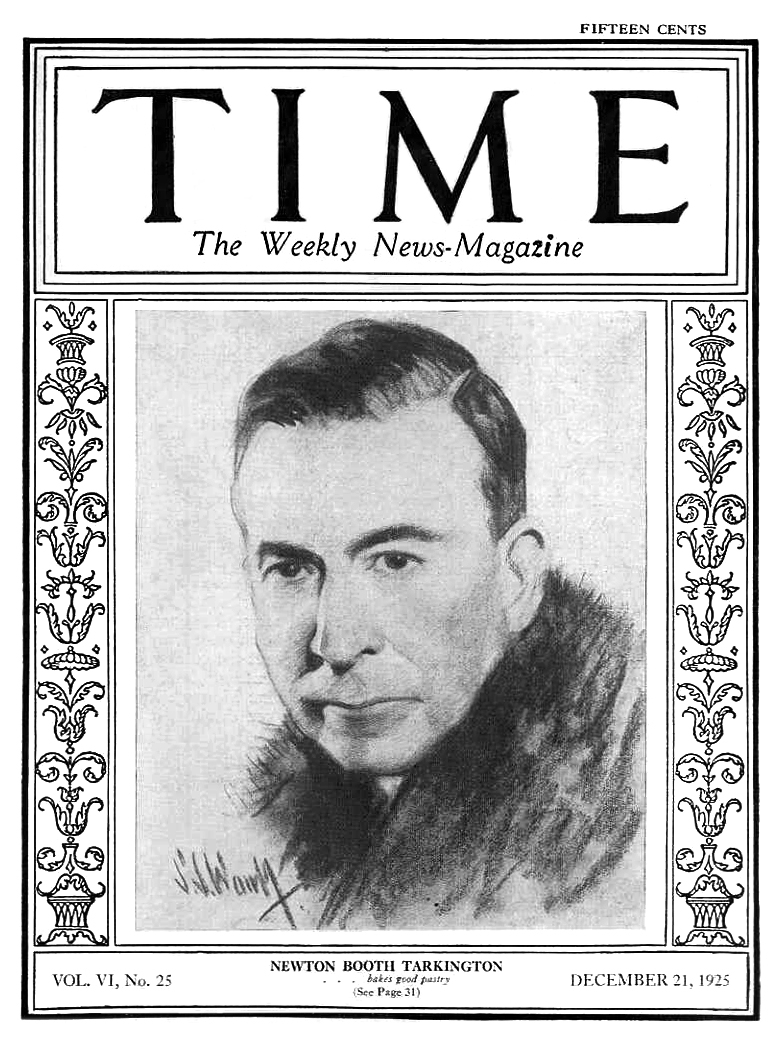
Booth Tarkington on the cover of Time (December 21, 1925)

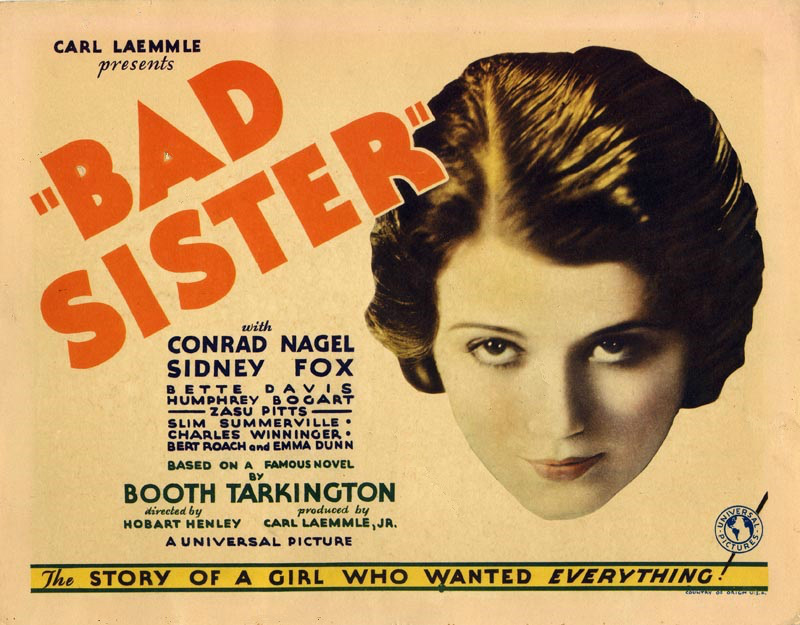
Lobby card for Bad Sister (1931), a film adaptation of The Flirt

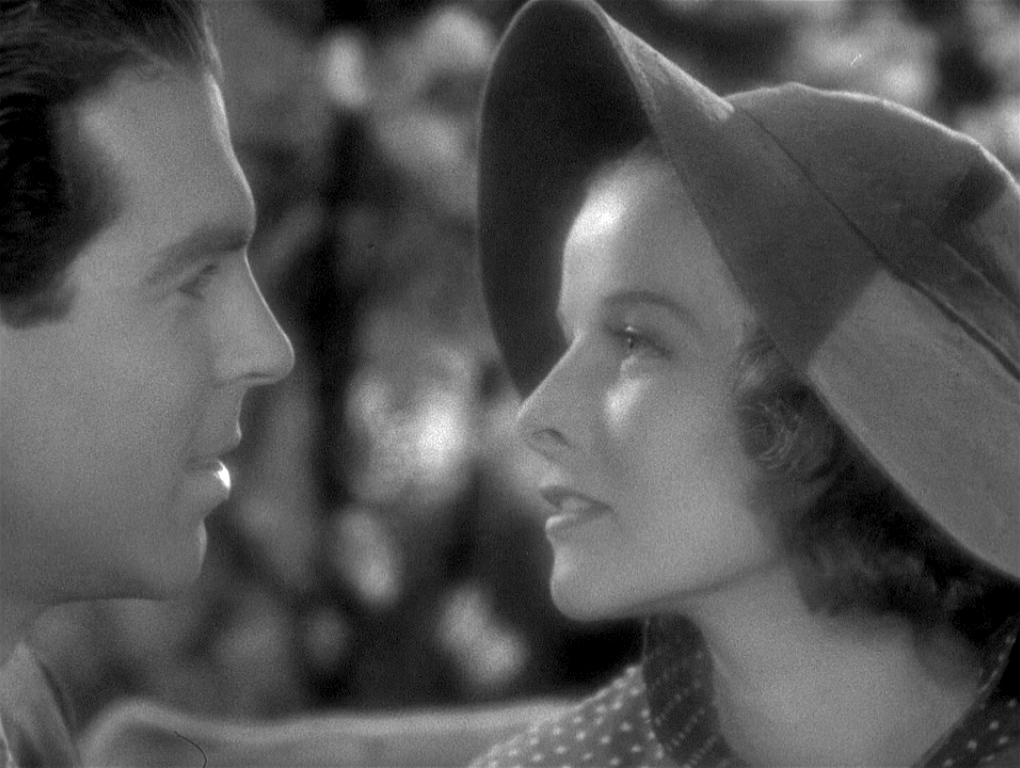
Fred MacMurray and Katharine Hepburn in Alice Adams (1935)

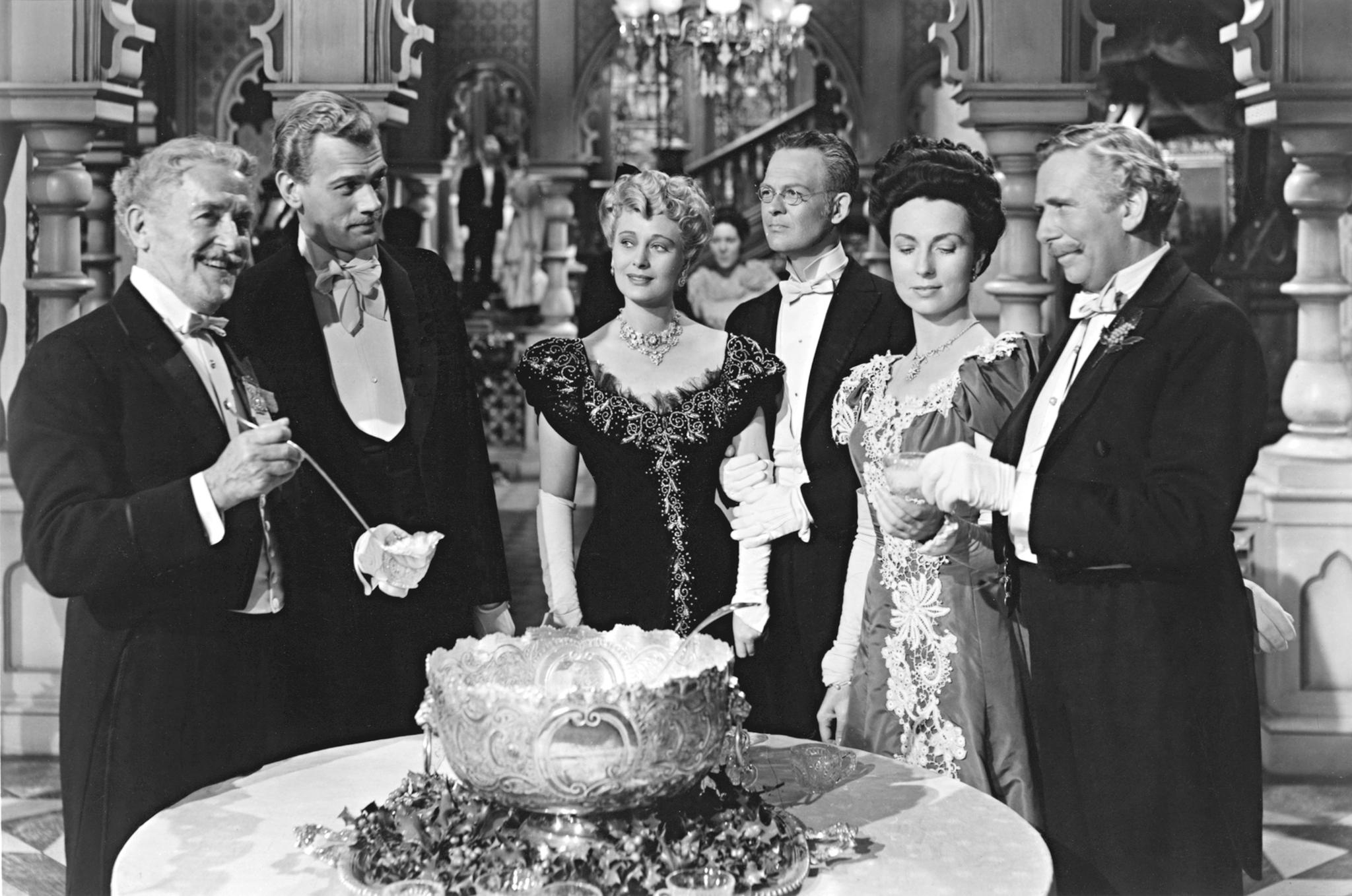
Richard Bennett, Joseph Cotten, Dolores Costello, Don Dillaway, Agnes Moorehead and Ray Collins in Orson Welles's The Magnificent Ambersons (1942)

=== Trilogies ===
==== Penrod ====
1. Penrod (1914)
2. Penrod and Sam (1916)
3. Penrod Jashber (1929)

Two film musicals were loosely based on the Penrod series, On Moonlight Bay (1951) and its sequel, By the Light of the Silvery Moon (1954), with Doris Day and Gordon MacRae.

==== Growth ====
1. The Turmoil (1915)
2. The Magnificent Ambersons (1918)
  Winner of the 1919 Pulitzer Prize
  Adapted for a 1942 film by Orson Welles and a 2002 television movie
3. The Midlander (1923, re-titled National Avenue in 1927)

=== Novels ===
- The Gentleman from Indiana (1899)
- Monsieur Beaucaire (1900)
  - Later adapted as a play, an operetta and two films: 1924 and 1946
- Old Gray Eagle (1901)
- The Two Vanrevels (October 1902)
- Cherry (October 1903)
  - Serialized in Harper's Magazine, January and February 1901
- In the Arena (January 1905)
- The Beautiful Lady (May 1905)
- The Conquest of Canaan (October 1905)
- His Own People (October 1907)
- The Guest of Quesnay (1908)
- Beasley's Christmas Party (October 1909)
- Beauty and the Jacobin, an Interlude of the French Revolution (1912)
- The Flirt (1913)
  - Adapted for film in 1922 and has since been lost.
  - Adapted as Bad Sister (1931 film)
- Seventeen (1916)
- The Spring Concert (1916)
- The Rich Man's War (1917)
- Ramsey Milholland (1919)
- Alice Adams (1921)
  - Winner of the 1922 Pulitzer Prize
    Adapted for film in 1923 and 1935
- Gentle Julia (1922)
  - Filmed in 1923 and 1936
- Women (1925)
- The Plutocrat (1927)
- Claire Ambler (1928)
- The World Does Move (1928)
- Mirthful Haven (1930)
- Mary's Neck (1932)
- Presenting Lily Mars (1933)
  - Adapted for film in 1943
- Rumbin Galleries (1934, romantic novel)
- Little Orvie (1934)
- Horse and Buggy Days (1936)
  - Appeared in Cosmopolitan, September 1936
- The Lorenzo Bunch (1936)
- The Fighting Littles (1941)
- The Heritage of Hatcher Ide (1941)
- Kate Fennigate (1943)
- Image of Josephine (1945)
- The Show Piece (1947, posthumously published)

=== Short story collections ===
- In the Arena: Stories of Political Life (1905)
- The Fascinating Stranger and Other Stories (1923)

=== Short stories ===
- War Stories (1919, one of Tarkington's stories was included in this anthology)

=== Collections ===
- Poe's Run: and other poems … to which is appended the book of the chronicles of the Elis (1904, co-author, with M'Cready Sykes)
- Harlequin and Columbine (1921)

=== Non-fiction ===
- What the Victory or Defeat of Germany Means to Every American (1917)
- The Collector's Whatnot (1923)
- Just Princeton (1924)
- Looking Forward, and Others (1926)
  Contains "Looking Forward to the Great Adventure", "Nipskillions", "The Hopeful Pessimist", "Stars in the Dust-heap", "The Golden Age" and "Happiness Now"
- The World Does Move (1929)
- Some Old Portraits (1939; essays on 17th century artworks)
- What We've Got to Do (1942)
- Booth Tarkington On Dogs (1944)
- Your Amiable Uncle (1949, posthumously published)
- On Plays, Playwrights, and Playgoers (1959, posthumously published)

=== Plays ===
- The Man from Home (1907, co-written with Harry Leon Wilson)
- Cameo Kirby (1908, one-act play co-written with Harry Leon Wilson)
- Your Humble Servant (1910, co-written with Harry Leon Wilson)
- The Ohio Lady (1916, co-written with Julian Leonard Street, and later reworked into The Country Cousin)
- Mister Antonio (1916)
- The Country Cousin (1917, co-written with Julian Leonard Street)
- The Gibson Upright (1919, co-written with Harry Leon Wilson)
- Up from Nowhere (1919, co-written with Harry Leon Wilson)
- Clarence (1919)
- Poldekin (1920)
- The Wren (1921)
- The Intimate Strangers (1921)
- Tweedles (1921, co-written with Harry Leon Wilson. Originally called Bristol Glass, it was renamed in 1923.)
- The Ghost Story (1922)
- Rose Briar (1922)
- Magnolia (1923)
- The Trysting Place (1923)
- Bimbo the Pirate (1926)
- Station YYYY (1927)
- The Travellers (1927)
- How's Your Health? (1930)
- Lady Hamilton and Her Nelson (1945 radio play, written in 1940)
