= Seventeen (play) =

1917 play by Hugh Stanislaus Stange and Stannard Mears

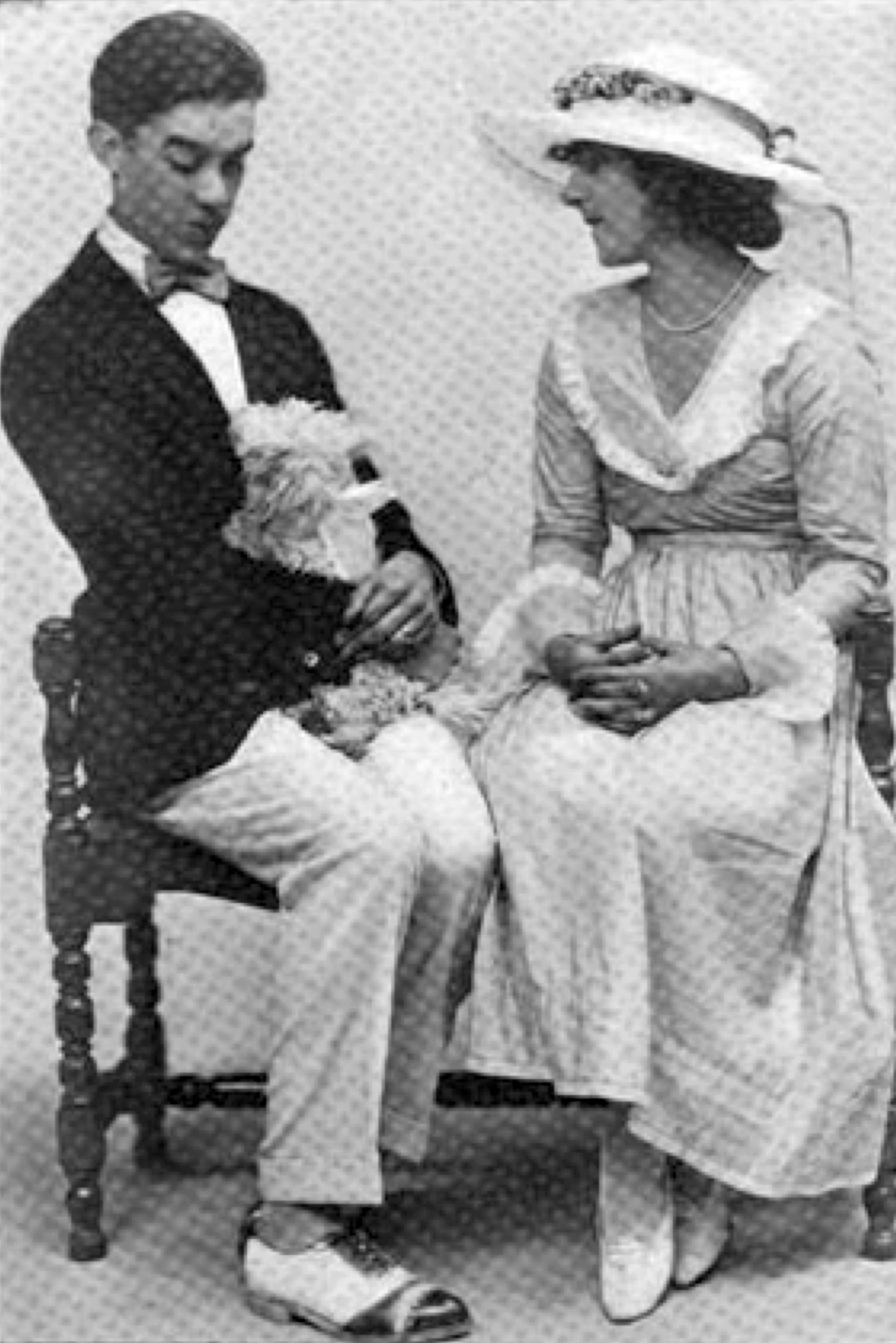
- Gregory Kelly and Ruth Gordon in Seventeen (1918)
- Original language: English
- Written by: Hugh Stanislaus Stange, Stannard Mears, and Stuart Walker
- Based on: Seventeen by Booth Tarkington
- Subject: Scenes of late adolescence
- Genre: Comedy
- Setting: The Baxter home and Parcher's front porch, in a small Indiana town.

Premiere
- Date: January 21, 1918
- Place: Booth Theatre
- Directed by: Stuart Walker

Seventeen is a 1917 play by writers Hugh Stanislaus Stange, Stannard Mears, and Stuart Walker, based on Booth Tarkington's 1916 novel. It is a four-act comedy with six scenes and two settings. The story concerns a seventeen-year-old boy in a small town who is smitten with a visiting beauty, enduring the pangs of a crush with the humiliation of not being accepted as adult by his family and friends.

The play was first produced and staged by Stuart Walker, with settings by Frank J. Zimmerer, and starring Gregory Kelly and Ruth Gordon. It had a tryout at Indianapolis in June 1917, followed by an opening tour starting September 1917. It premiered on Broadway during January 1918 and ran through August 1918 for over 250 performances.

The play had been preceded by a 1916 silent film version of Tarkington's novel. A musical version of the stage play was produced in 1926 as Hello, Lola, followed by a 1940 film adaptation. Another stage musical of the same name made in 1951, went back to the Tarkington novel for its storyline.

== Characters ==
Characters are listed in order of appearance within their scope.

Lead

- William Sylvanus Baxter called Willie, is 17, romantic, imaginative, whose ideal is Sydney Carton.
- Lola Pratt is 18, a beautiful visitor whose "baby-talk" conceals a perceptive and socially adroit person.

Supporting

- Mr. Baxter called Sylvanus, is Willie and Jane's father, though he sometimes wishes he wasn't.
- Jane Baxter is 10, Willie's eavesdropping younger sister, and the bane of his life.
- Mrs. Baxter called Mary, is Willie and Jane's very patient and caring mother.
- Johnnie Watson is Willie's best friend, who persists in calling him Silly Bill. (Note: Willie explains to his father the moniker comes from reversing his first and middle names.)
- May Parcher is 18, Lola's friend at college. She has decided Johnnie Watson is her best bet for a beau.

Featured

- Genesis is a Black handyman whom Jane thinks is nice but Willie barely tolerates.
- Joe Bullitt is a friend of Willie and Johnnie, a bit belligerent, considered too sarcastic by May Parcher.
- Mr. Parcher is the suffering father of the household where Lola is staying as a guest of his daughter, May.
- George Crooper is 19 and a cousin of Johnnie; a big pushy fellow, he lives in Blairsville and owns two cars.
- Ethel Boke is a heavy young lady at the Parcher's party, who gives Willie a clue to the real Lola Pratt.
- Wallie Banks is a young man, friends with Willie's gang.
- Mary Brooks is a young woman who comes to the Parcher's party.

Canine

- Flopit is a white lap dog that Lola dotes on and carries around.
- Clematis is a mongrel that follows Genesis, mostly apparent only from off-stage sounds and reactions by others.

== Synopsis ==
The play covers most of the novel published in March 1916, ending at the Parcher's party and omitting the last three chapters.

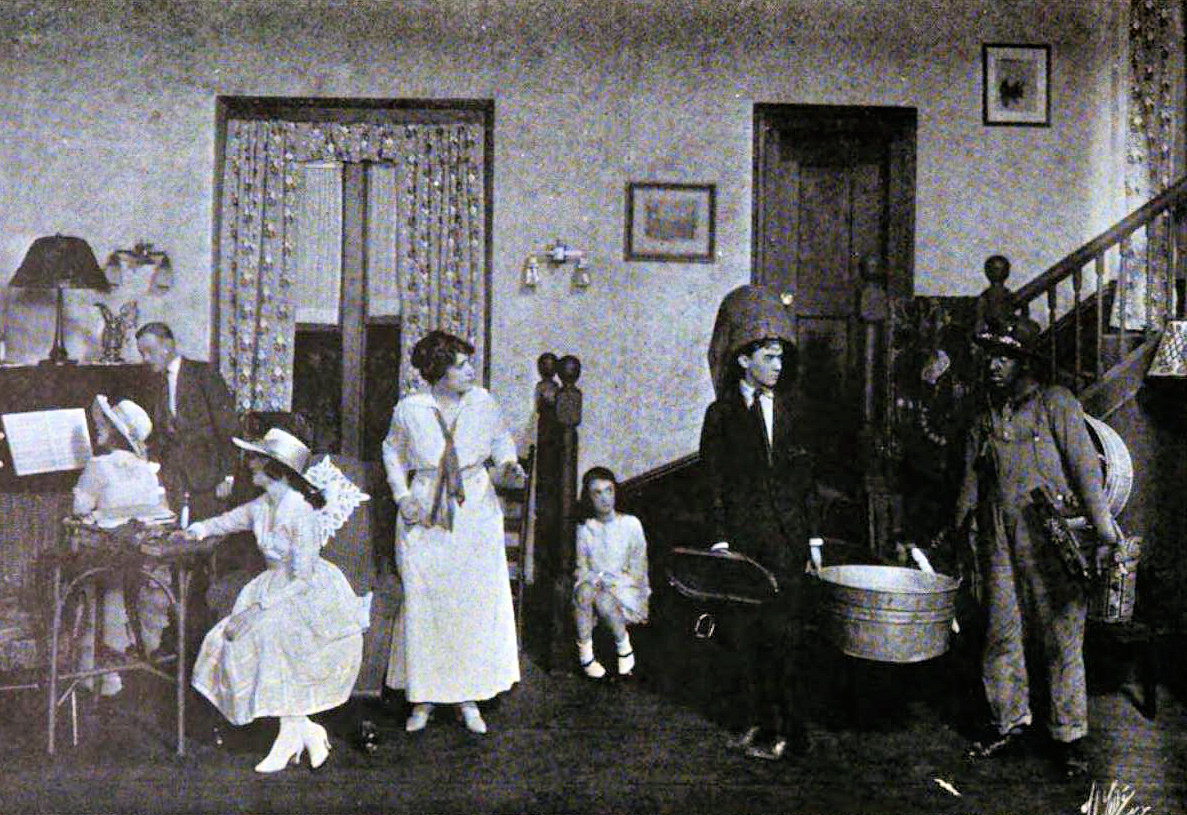

Act I (The living-hall of the Baxter home, noon on a June day.) Willie lobbies Mr. Baxter for a dress suit. Mrs. Baxter thinks Mr. Baxter's dress suit is in the hall closet, but needs letting out. Johnnie discusses with Willie the new girl visiting May Parcher. Willie insists he isn't interested. Jane opens the front door to May Parcher and her guest, Lola Pratt. Willie is smitten and can barely respond to her greeting. Mrs. Baxter annoys Willie by sending him to help Genesis fetch some old wash-tubs. May and Lola greet Johnnie and Joe Bullitt, who heard Lola was at the Baxter's. When Genesis and Willie arrive with the tubs, Flopit and Clem start fighting outside (off-stage). Willie slips away unnoticed, while everyone rushes outside. They all return, Genesis holding Clem while Lola holds Flopit. The visitors depart, Jane and Mrs. Baxter go upstairs. Willie goes to the hall closet, removes his father's dress suit and sneaks upstairs. (Curtain)

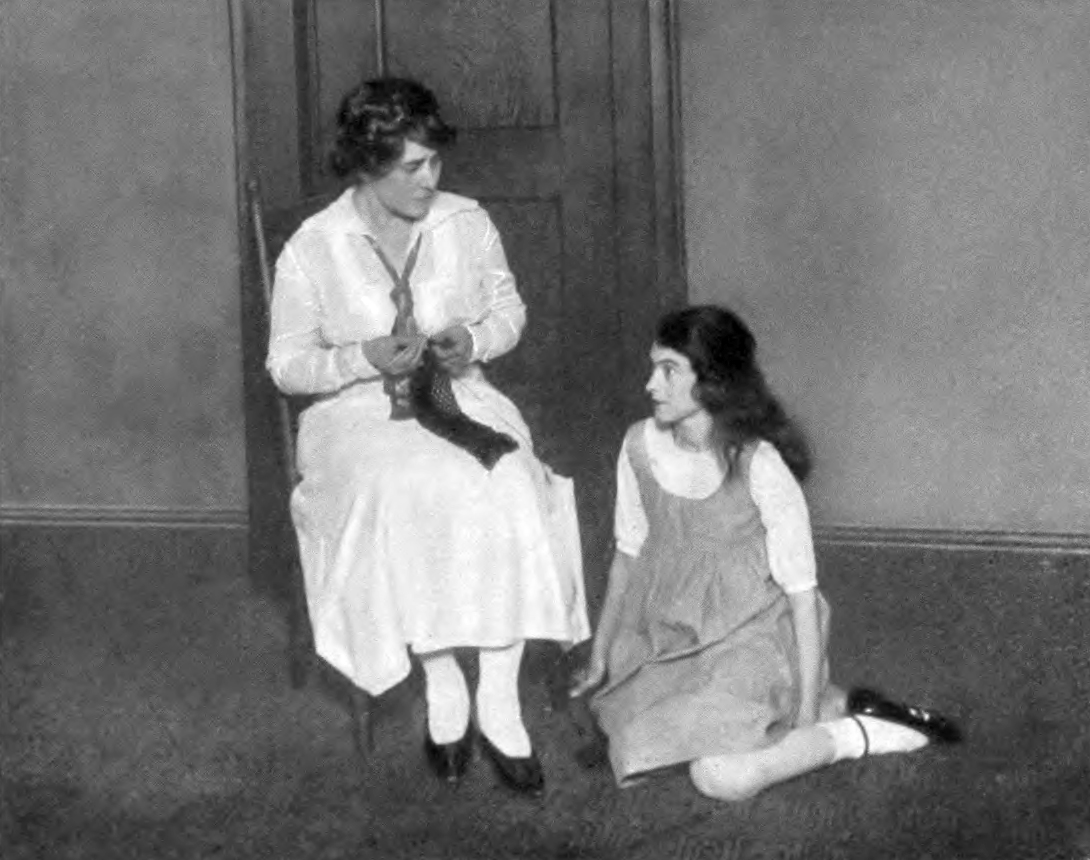

Act II (Scene 1: Same as Act I, two weeks later, evening.) Mrs. Baxter wonders what became of the dress suit. Willie accuses Jane of behaving like a child in front of "Miss Pratt" earlier that day. Jane and Willie spar until he goes upstairs in a snit. Jane sits at her mother's knee, and relates everything she heard at the Parchers, about how they are tired of Miss Pratt and wished she'd leave, and how Mr. Parcher can't go anywhere around his house without tripping over Willie or some other boy. Later, Willie sneaks downstairs in a bathrobe, which he takes off to reveal the missing dress suit. He goes out, while Jane peers around the corner. She soon spills to Mrs. Baxter about the dress suit. When Mr. Baxter returns home, Mrs. baxter confides her worry that Willie is getting too serious about Miss Pratt. (Curtain)

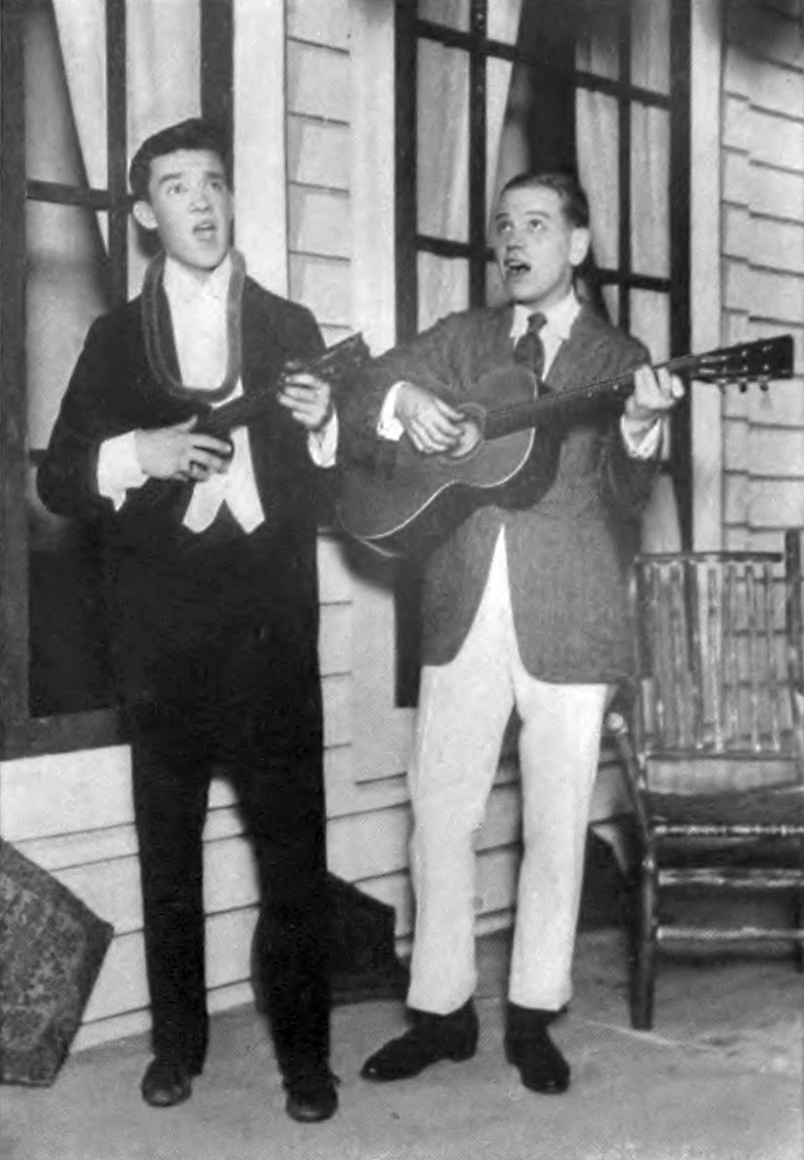

(Scene 2: Porch of the Parcher house, same evening.) Mr. Parcher asks May when Lola is going home but she doesn't know. Johnnie comes by and May tries to get him to sit, but he wants to know where Lola is. At that moment Lola and Willie return from a walk, the latter holding Flopit. Willie and May are colluding on keeping Johnnie from Lola for different reasons. Johnnie takes May for a walk, while Willie and Lola have a long discussion on Love, to the annoyance of Mr. Parcher in the living room. He finally exits, slamming a door, just as Johnnie and May return. Joe comes by and argues with Willie until Lola tactfully gets everyone to sing with her. The boys leave. The girls discuss them, with Lola assuring May she won't interfere between Johnnie and her. After the girls go in, Johnnie and Willie return, carrying a guitar and ukulele. They serenade the girls from the porch, earning applause and another slammed door from inside. (Curtain)

Act III (Same as Act I, about mid-August, evening.) Mrs. Baxter finds the dress suit and sends it to the tailor. Genesis tells Jane about a second hand clothing store, where you can barter belongings. Willie, overhearing, takes two empty baskets to his room. Mr. Parcher tells the Baxter parents that Lola is finally going away Friday on the midnight express. There will be a farewell party for her, with music and dancing. The Baxters agree to help set things up, but Willie, once again refused a dress suit, disappears. Jane says he filled the baskets with his clothes and half convinces her parents he has eloped. However, he returns shortly, and tries to borrow a few dollars from his mother, as his clothes were not enough to secure a used dress suit. Joe, Johnnie, May, and Lola arrive with George Crooper, a large, insensitive fellow, who dominates Lola's attention. They are going for a ride, but since Crooper's car only holds five, Willie volunteers to stay behind, hoping to impress Lola with his nobility à la Sydney Carton. (Curtain)

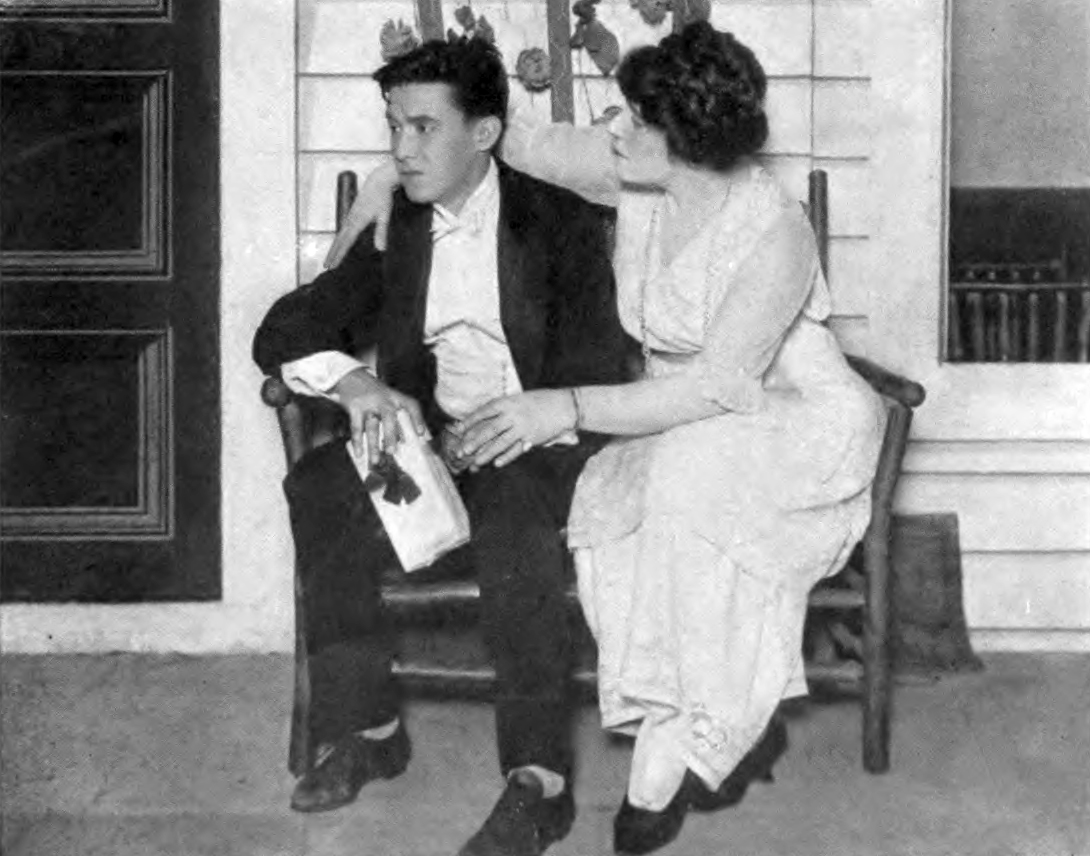

Act IV (Scene 1: Same as Act II Scene 2, the following Friday at twilight.) Mr. and Mrs. Baxter are helping the Parchers fix up their front porch for the party. Jane and Genesis between them explain Willie is trying to raise the final money needed for the used dress suit. Mr. Baxter sends Genesis to fetch Willie, while Jane has been primed to let him know his father's dress suit is at home, unaltered. Mrs. Baxter forces Willie to retrieve his clothes from the second-hand shop and take them home. Jane runs back in to say Willie wouldn't listen to her. (Quick curtain)

(Scene 2: Same as Act II Scene 2, three hours later.) Having arrived at the Parcher's party too late, Willie misses out on dancing with Lola. His friends won't yield any of their pre-arranged dances (Note: The play satirizes the use of dance cards at such a small party.) with Lola to him. May introduces him to Ethel Boke, who leads Willie out to dance with her. She whirls and swings him about, so Willie finds an excuse to go sit on the porch. As they sit together, Ethel mentions Lola's comment to other girls that she couldn't possibly get engaged to any man who didn't have at least $750,000. Willie tries again to persuade Lola to dance with him, but she is all booked up for the night. When George Crooper arrives in his two-seater car, Willie's last chance to be alone with Lola vanishes. Crooper takes Lola to the train station, while Mrs. Baxter tries to console her son, who realizes now the romance was all one-way. (Curtain)

== Original production ==
=== Background ===
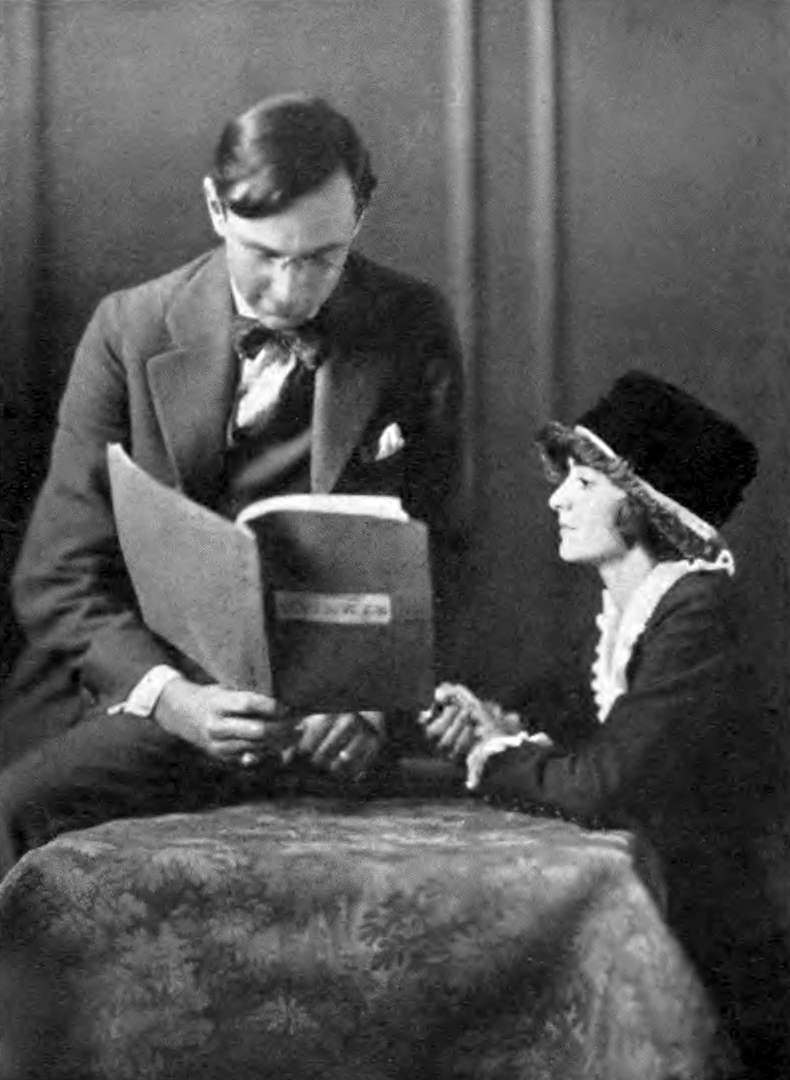
Stuart Walker and Lillian Ross

Booth Tarkington granted Stannard Mears and his partner Hugh Stanislaus Stange the right to make a dramatization of Seventeen in August 1916, but didn't convey to them an exclusive right for same. He also didn't make any commitment to production, other than ask the partners to pay him 40% of royalties if they did mount a production. The movie rights had already been disposed of during 1916, so any production contract could only cover the stage rights.

When Stuart Walker contacted Tarkington in April 1917 to discuss dramatization, he was referred to Mears and Stange. Walker entered into a contract with the partners in late April to produce their as yet unwritten play. When they completed their play, its suitability was to be tested with a tryout in Indianapolis in June 1917. Walker disliked it and wrote another with Maximilian Elser before the tryout. The play as published in 1924 was copyright to Walker in 1917, though it listed Stange, Mears, and Walker on the title page.

A young-looking teenage actress (Lillian Ross) was used to play 10-year-old Jane Baxter, casting made easier by Walker's version of the play excluding events in the last three chapters of Tarkington's novel. Stange and Mears' version of the play had included them, wherein 10-year-old Rannie Kirsted is introduced, and in the last chapter, revealed as Wille's "bride-to-be". The Stange and Mears stage version had ended with a flash forward and the marriage of Willie and Rannie.

The settings were designed and built by Frank J. Zimmerer, a graduate of the Chicago Art Institute and former head of the Kansas City Art Institute. He was assisted by actor Arthur Wells, who played Wallie Banks.

=== Cast ===
Principal cast during the opening tour and the Broadway run. The production was on hiatus from July 1 through September 16, 1917.
Role	Actor	Dates	Notes and sources
Willie Baxter	Gregory Kelly	Jun 18, 1917 - Jun 15, 1918	Kelly, 26 when he started playing this part, had been on stage for 13 years.
Willie Baxter	Paul Kelly	Jun 17, 1918 - Aug 17, 1918	Paul Kelly (no relation) took over when Gregory Kelly went to Walker's new play.
Willie Baxter	Gregory Kelly	Aug 19, 1918 - Aug 31, 1918	
Lola Pratt	Agnes Rogers	Jun 18, 1917 - Jun 30, 1918	Rogers, known as Aggie, was kept as understudy, but left acting after the Chicago run.
Lola Pratt	Ruth Gordon	Sep 17, 1918 - Aug 31, 1918	Gordon was cast by Gregory Kelly over the objections of Stuart Walker.
Mr. Baxter	Lew Medbury	Jun 18, 1917 - Aug 31, 1918	
Jane Baxter	Lillian Ross	Jun 18, 1917 - Aug 31, 1918	Ross, playing a 10-year-old, (Note: The question of her real age was widely asked at the time. She told one interviewer during January 1918 she was 17, but then told another a month later she turned 18 on August 1, 1917.) impressed critics with her fidelity to the character's age.
Mrs. Baxter	Judith Lowry	Jun 18, 1917 - Jun 15, 1918	Lowry should not be confused with Judith Lowry.
Mrs. Baxter	Florence Hart	Jun 17, 1918 - Aug 31, 1918	Gordon in her 1976 memoir said Elizabeth Patterson rather than Hart filled in.
Johnnie Watson	Neil Martin	Jun 18, 1917 - Aug 31, 1918	Martin was a drama critic and press agent before becoming an actor.
May Parcher	Dorothea Carothers	Jun 18, 1917 - Jun 30, 1917	
May Parcher	Beatrice Maude	Sep 17, 1917 - Aug 31, 1918	
Genesis	George Gaul	Jun 18, 1917 - Jun 15, 1918	Gaul played this role in blackface.
Genesis	TBD	Jun 18, 1917 - Aug 31, 1918	
Joe Bullitt	Morgan Farley	Jun 18, 1917 - Aug 31, 1918	
Mr Parcher	V. L. Granville	Jun 18, 1917 - Jan 19, 1918	
Mr Parcher	Eugene Stockdale	Jan 21, 1918 - Aug 31, 1918	This was a stage name for the producer Stuart Walker.
George Crooper	Edgar Stehli	Jun 18, 1917 - Jan 19, 1918	
George Crooper	Paul Kelly	Jan 21, 1918 - Jun 15, 1918	
George Crooper	Ben Lyon	Jun 17, 1918 - Aug 31, 1918	
Ethel Boke	Agnes Horton	Jun 18, 1917 - Aug 31, 1918	
Wallie Banks	Arthur Wells	Jun 18, 1917 - Aug 31, 1918	Besides his small feature part, Wells helped design and build the settings.
Mary Brooks	Beatrice Maude	Jun 18, 1917 - Jun 30, 1917	
Mary Brooks	Henrietta McDannel	Sep 17, 1917 - Aug 31, 1918	

=== Tryout ===
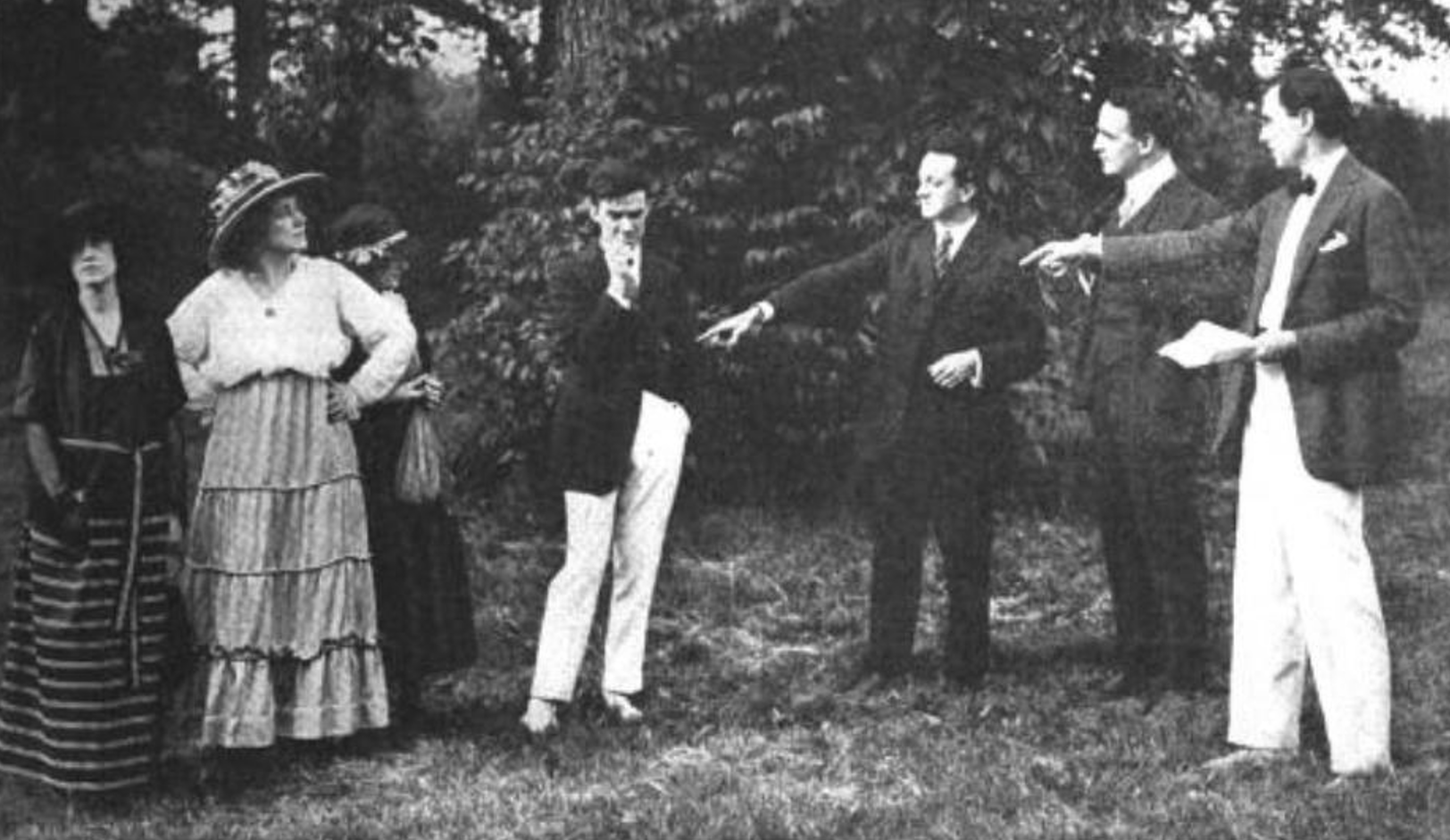

Seventeen had its first performance at the Murat Theatre in Indianapolis on June 18, 1917. Booked for one week, it was extended for another, partly for popular demand but also so Walker could tighten up the performance. A local reviewer had suggested as much as twenty minutes could be cut. Critics praised the performances of Gregory Kelly (Willie), Judith Lowry (Mrs. Baxter), Neil Martin (Johnnie), and Lillian Ross (Jane), but were dubious about Agatha Rogers as the "Baby-Talk Girl". Her performance was hindered by artificial mannerisms and a stuffed Flopit instead of a real dog. A local critic reported "the acting version of Seventeen has been changing gradually since opening night", with Walker promising a further 10 minutes of cuts to come.

=== Opening tour ===
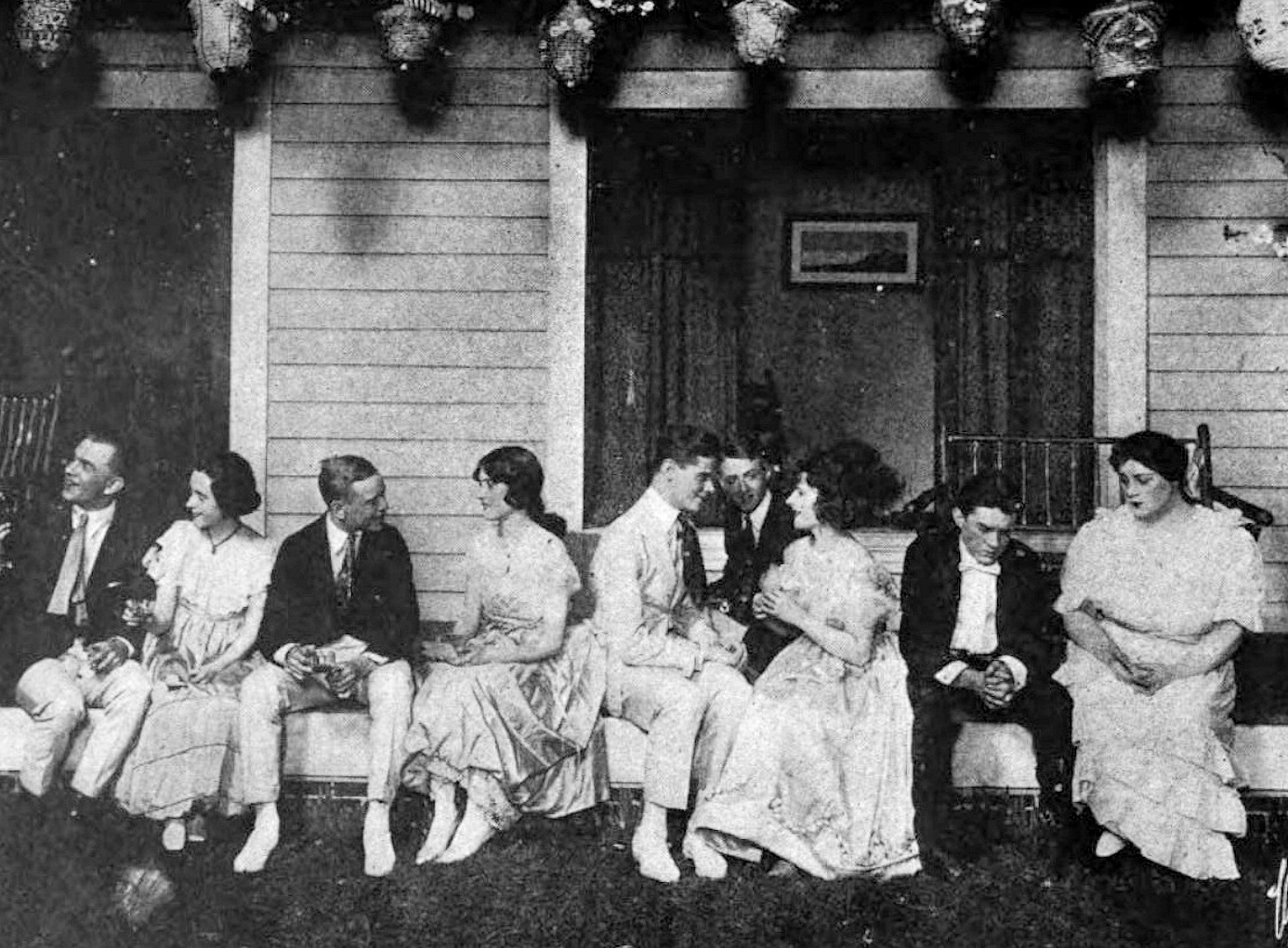

The production resumed on September 17, 1918, at Columbus, Ohio, with Ruth Gordon replacing Agnes Rogers as Lola Pratt, and Beatrice Maude promoted to playing May Parcher. Despite her poor reviews from June, Rogers was kept on as understudy to Gordon. Following two nights in Columbus, Seventeen played a series of one-night engagements for two weeks, before going into a steady run at Chicago.

Seventeen opened in Chicago at the Playhouse on October 1, 1917. Percy Hammond of the Chicago Tribune thought the acting in general was good, but saved his greatest praise for Lillian Ross, even suggesting the title should be changed to Ten. He also disagreed with Tarkington's assessment of Kelly as the best possible "Willie", and after praising other actors (Note: Hammond deplored the "British accents" of Henry Crosby, an actor whose name does not appear on any cast list for Seventeen.) failed to mention Ruth Gordon. After 100 performances, Seventeen closed at the Playhouse on December 15, 1917.

Following a holiday hiatus, the production re-opened at the Lyric Theatre in Cincinnati on December 23, 1917. It went to Detroit's Garrick Theatre on December 31, 1917, where the first night house was full and enthusiastic.

=== Broadway premiere and reception ===
Seventeen premiered at the Booth Theatre on January 21, 1918. The reviewer for The Sun felt the play's success owed more to Walker's "theatre genius" than to the writing of Stange and Mears. They also favored the acting of Lillian Ross as Jane ("delightfully natural"), while opining Gregory Kelly's acting needed "more spontaneity and less self-consciousness". Charles Darnton at The Evening World felt Tarkington would have done a better job dramatising his novel than Stange and Mears. His characters were what made the play work, while the playwrights writing "is without definite form", "merely a series of episodes". Darnton praised the acting of Kelly and Ross, but emphasized Ruth Gordon's beauty rather than her acting.

The New York Times thought the writing was fine and gave Kelly, Gordon, and Ross plaudits for their performances. J. Alexander Pierce of the New York Tribune also complimented Kelly, Gordon, and Ross, but said that Walker had rearranged and revised what Stange and Mears had written. The critic for The Brooklyn Daily Eagle emphasized how quickly the play captured the audience's approval, thought Lillian Ross "extraordinarily clever", but also remarked on Gregory Kelly's self-consciousness.

Heywood Broun wrote an idiosyncratic review of Seventeen after it had completed two months on Broadway. Broun decried the lack of theatricality in the production and lamented the thin plot, saying "The story is over before the play ends". He wrote "Lillian Ross does an amazingly fine piece of work. We understand that she is less than twenty and an actress of brief experience. She played the child so well that we were sure she must be at least forty". He had praise for Gregory Kelly, Judith Lowry, and Neil Martin, but "Some of the rest are not so good".

=== Broadway closing ===
Seventeen reached its 250th performance on August 24, 1918, just one week before it closed on August 31, 1918, due to prior scheduling at the Booth Theatre. The final count of performances was either 257 or 258, depending on whether wartime restrictions (Note: During World War I, New York theatres were requested to remain dark two nights per week instead of just Sunday. According to Ruth Gordon's memoir, Tuesday was Seventeen's extra night off.) were still in effect.

=== Legal dispute ===
The lack of a formal production contract between Tarkington and the partners Stange and Mears led to a legal dispute. Walker continually asked Mears and Stange to provide a copy of the contract, which they ignored. When the play reached Broadway in January 1918, he cut off their royalty payments, on the grounds they had no exclusive rights to dramatize the novel, and his tryout version of the play owed little to their treatment. Walker then signed Tarkington to a production contract in March 1918. The partners filed a lawsuit which went to trial in April 1919. Stange and Mears were awarded $4900 on May 3, 1919, of the back royalties they had sought. The dispute went to New York's highest court of appeals in 1921, where the original judgement was upheld.

== Adaptations ==
=== Stage ===
- Hello, Lola was a 1926 musical, adapted by Dorothy Donnelly from the stage play, with music by William B. Kernell and lyrics by Donnelly. It was directed by Seymour Felix. It starred Richard Keene and Edythe Baker as Willie and Lola, and had Marjorie White (Jane), Jay C. Flippen (Genesis), Elisha Cook Jr. (Joe), and George E. Stone (Johnnie) in support. It opened on January 12, 1926, at the Eltinge Theatre and closed February 20, 1926, at Maxine Elliott's Theatre.

=== Film ===
- Seventeen is a 1940 film, produced by Paramount, written by Agnes Christine Johnston and Stuart Palmer from the play by Walker, Stange, and Mears. It starred Jackie Cooper and Betty Field as Willie and Lola.

== Bibliography ==
- Hugh Stanislaus Stange and Stannard Mears in collaboration with Stuart Walker. Seventeen: A Play of Youth and Love and Summertime in Four Acts. Samuel French, 1924.
- Booth Tarkington. Seventeen: A Tale of Youth and Summer Time and the Baxter Family Especially William. Grosset & Dunlap, 1916.
- Ruth Gorden. My Side: The Autobiography of Ruth Gordon. Harper & Row, 1976. ISBN 0-06-011618-8.
- Supreme Court of the State of New York, Appellate Division, Hugh Stanislaus Stange and Benjamin Stannard Mears, Plaintiffs-Respondents, against Stuart Walker and Maximilian Elser, Jr., Defendants-Appellants, 1922.
