= Ben Mears =

Ben Mears may refer to:

- Benjamin S. Mears (1871–1952), American stage actor, vaudeville performer, and playwright
- Ben Mears, a character from the horror novel 'Salem's Lot by Stephen King
