= Seventeen (musical) =

- Music: Walter Kent
- Lyrics: Kim Gannon
- Book: Sally Benson
- Setting: Indianapolis, 1907
- Basis: Seventeen by Booth Tarkington
- Premiere: June 21, 1951: Broadhurst Theatre, New York City

Seventeen is a 1951 American musical that debuted in the United States starring Kenneth Nelson.

== Overview ==
Set in Indianapolis in 1907, Seventeen is based on Booth Tarkington’s Seventeen: A Tale of Youth and Summer Time and the Baxter Family Especially William, a series of sketches first published in 1914 in Metropolitan Magazine, before being collected into a book two years later. Adapted as a 1916 silent film, then a 1917 stage play, it became a 1926 musical under the title Hello, Lola.

In an adaptation by The New Yorker writer Sally Benson, and music by Walter Kent and lyrics by Kim Gannon, Seventeen opened at the Broadhurst Theatre on Broadway June 21, 1951. The show detailed the puppy-love romance between 17-year-old Willie Baxter and the flirtatious Lola Pratt, portrayed by Kenneth Nelson and Ann Crowley. It ran for 182 performances.
