= Walter Kent =

American composer and conductor (1911–1994)

- Born: Walter Maurice Kaufman; November 29, 1911; New York City, New York, United States
- Died: March 2, 1994 (aged 82) Woodland Hills, Los Angeles, California, United States
- Genres: Broadway, musicals, revues
- Occupation: Composer

Walter Kent (born Walter Maurice Kaufman, November 29, 1911 – March 2, 1994) was an American composer and conductor. Some notable compositions are: "I'll Be Home for Christmas", "I'm Gonna Live Till I Die" and "(There'll Be Bluebirds Over) The White Cliffs of Dover".

== Early life ==
Walter Kent was born to a Jewish family on November 29, 1911, in New York City. He graduated from Townsend Harris Hall High School. Kent studied violin with advanced, private instruction from Leopold Auer and Samuel Gardner. He also enrolled at City College of New York, studying drafting, with the idea of becoming an architect, but never completed a university education. He did some work as a draftsman, but gave it up to pursue song writing. Kent conducted his own orchestra in New York, performing in theaters and on the radio.

== Career ==
In 1932, Kent co-wrote his first major song with Milton Drake and Abner Silver entitled, "Pu-Leeze, Mister Hemingway".

Throughout the 1930s and 1940s, Kent worked bi-coastally, writing songs in New York City and writing for the motion picture industry composing songs for films, including several westerns. As World War II started in Europe, Kent's work turned towards the conflict, with the composition of the music for "(There'll Be Bluebirds Over) The White Cliffs of Dover" in 1941. The song expressed hope that England's struggle against the Nazis would soon be over. Kent received two Oscar nominations, one in 1944 for his song "Too Much In Love", showcased in the film Song of the Open Road and another in 1945 for "Endlessly" found in Earl Carroll Vanities. In 1951, Walter Kent wrote the score for the muscical Seventeen alongside Kim Gannon. The musical was shown for five months. Throughout his career, Kent worked with multiple artists including; Al Hoffman, Mann Curtis, Jerome Jerome, Richard Byron and Milton Drake. After 1951, Kent's career in Hollywood dwindled and he seldom produced any music following his work on Seventeen.

== Death ==
Preceding his death in 1989, Kent journeyed to Kent, England (the Anglo-Saxon namesake of his adopted surname) to view the cliffs of Dover. At the time of his visit, he donated an original manuscript of the song "(There'll Be Bluebirds Over) The White Cliffs of Dover" and participated in the preliminary stages of planning a war commemoration tourist center. Walter Kent died at the age of 82 on March 2, 1994, in Los Angeles.

== Composed works ==
The following is a list of musical works from the career of Walter Kent:

- "Where" (1932)
- "Puleeze, Mr. Hemingway" (1932)
- "Country Boy" (1934)
- "You Opened My Eyes" (1935)
- "Love is Like A Cigarette" (1936)
- "El Amor es una Ilusión" (1936)
- "Harlem Waltz"; from the Broadway musical Ziegfeld Follies of 1936 (1936)
- "Mama, I Wanna Make Rhythm" (1937)
- "Apple Blossoms and Chapel Bells" (1939)
- "(There'll Be Bluebirds Over) The White Cliffs of Dover" (1941)
- "When The Roses Bloom Again" (1942)
- "I Never Mention Your Name" (1943)
- "My Best Gal" (1943)
- "I'll Be Home for Christmas" (1943)
- "Too Much In Love" (1944)
- "Hitchhike to Happiness" (1945)
- "Endlessly" (1945)
- "That's My Gal" (1947)
- "Ahh But It Happens" (1947)
- "Johnny Appleseed" (1948)
- "The Last Mile Home" (1949)
- "I Cross My Fingers" (1949)
- "I'm Gonna Live Till I Die" (1950)
- "I Could Get Married Today"; from the Broadway musical Seventeen (1951)
- "After All It's Spring"; from the Broadway musical Seventeen (1951)

== Filmography ==
Kent began composing for movies in the 1930s, and continued to do so for the next three decades. Kent received Academy Award nominations for his film compositions entitled "Too Much In Love" (1944) and "Endlessly" (1945). He worked alongside Kim Gannon, composing songs for the big screen, for much of his Hollywood career. In 1950, Kent worked with Gannon once again to create the musical stage score for Seventeen, a Broadway musical based upon the novel of the same name by Booth Tarkington. Kent's song "I'll Be Home For Christmas" is often used in holiday-based cinema. His song "I'm Gonna Live Till I Die," as performed by Frank Sinatra, was most recently featured in the trailer for Knives Out (2019).

Below is a list of movies to which Kent contributed songs:

- I Loved You Wednesday (1933)
- Manhattan Merry-Go-Round (1937)
- The Singing Cowgirl (1938)
- The Night Hawk (1938)
- Prairie Moon (1938)
- Come On, Rangers! (1938)
- Shine On, Harvest Moon (1938)
- Water Rustlers (1939)
- Ride 'em, Cowgirl (1939)
- Stardust on the Sage (1942)
- Senorita from the West (1943)
- Casanova in Burlesque (1944)
- My Best Gal (1944)
- Louisiana Hayride (1944)
- Three Little Sisters (1944)
- Song of the Open Road (1944)
- Meet Miss Bobby Socks (1944)
- Bowery to Broadway (1944)
- Hitchhike to Happiness (1945)
- Earl Carroll Vanities (1945)
- Down Missouri Way (1946)
- Melody Time (1948)
- April Showers (1948)
- Belle of Old Mexico (1950)
- Sunny Side of the Street (1951)
- Villa!! (1958)
- The Beat Generation (1959)
- Swingin' Along (1962)
