= Seventeen (1940 film) =

- Theatrical release poster
- Directed by: Louis King
- Screenplay by: Agnes Christine Johnston; Stuart Palmer
- Based on: Seventeen by Booth Tarkington
- Produced by: Stuart Walker
- Starring: Jackie Cooper; Betty Field; Otto Kruger; Ann Shoemaker; Norma Gene Nelson; Betty Moran
- Cinematography: Victor Milner
- Edited by: Arthur P. Schmidt
- Music by: Charles Bradshaw; John Leipold
- Production company: Paramount Pictures
- Distributed by: Paramount Pictures
- Release date: March 1, 1940
- Running time: 78 minutes
- Country: United States
- Language: English

Seventeen is a 1940 American comedy film based upon the novel of the same name by Booth Tarkington and the subsequent play written by Stannard Mears, Hugh Stanislaus Stange and Stuart Walker. Directed by Louis King, the film stars Jackie Cooper, Betty Field, Otto Kruger, Ann Shoemaker, Norma Gene Nelson and Betty Moran. It was released on March 1, 1940, by Paramount Pictures.

== Cast ==
- Jackie Cooper as William Sylvanus Baxter
- Betty Field as Lola Pratt
- Otto Kruger as Sylvanus Baxter
- Ann Shoemaker as Mary Baxter
- Norma Gene Nelson as Jane Baxter
- Betty Moran as May Parcher
- Thomas W. Ross as Edward P. Parcher
- Peter Lind Hayes as George Cooper
- Buddy Pepper as Johnnie Watson
- Donald Haines as Joe Bullitt
- Richard Denning as Jack
- Paul E. Burns as McGrill
- Hal Clements as Wally Banks
- Edward Earle as Headwaiter
- Stanley Price as Waiter
- Joey Ray as Orchestra Leader
- Fred 'Snowflake' Toones as Genesis
- Hattie Noel as Adella
