= Maud Madison =

American actress and dancer (1870–1953)

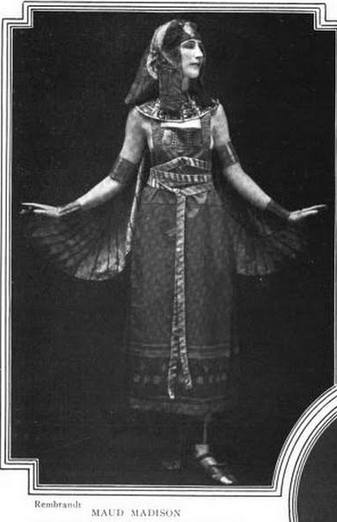
- Maud Madison, from a 1916 publication.
- Born: November 19, 1870; San Francisco, California, U.S.
- Died: October 4, 1953 (aged 82); Hollywood, California, U.S.
- Occupation(s): Dancer, actress
- Children: Beatrice Maude

Maud Madison (November 19, 1870 – October 4, 1953) was an American actress and dancer.

== Early life ==
Maud Madison was born in San Francisco, California. She was the daughter of actress and suffragist Julie Reinhardt (1844–1924). She completed studies at the Boucicault School of Acting in 1889.

== Career ==
Madison started her stage career as an actress in touring companies, and appeared with English actor Richard Mansfield in Richard III. By 1893, she was described primarily as a dancer, specializing in performance of the "crinoline dance" or skirt dance, a popular trend of the day. In 1900 she danced with Loie Fuller in Paris, at the Exposition Universelle. While in Paris, she also danced in a cage of lions as a publicity stunt. In 1910, she danced at the opening of the Colonial Opera House in Hamilton, Bermuda.

Inspired by Fuller, Madison took a particular interest in lighting effects and innovative costuming for her performances. She amazed audiences when flags and famous portraits were projected onto her skirts while they whirled and fluttered. "Miss Madison is the originator or many novel effects in ballroom exhibition dances," explained the San Francisco Chronicle in 1916. Madison toured the United States that year, with poet Charles Keeler, interpreting his poems in dances such as "The Harper's Song of Isis" (an Egyptian art-inspired dance), "The Vampire" (a bat-themed dance) and "Princess Papilio" (a butterfly-themed dance). She also taught social dance steps in New York City.

== Personal life ==
Madison had a daughter, Beatrice Maude, who became an actress. Madison died in 1953, at home in Hollywood, California. A collection of her papers is archived in the Jerome Robbins Dance Division of the New York Public Library.
