= Benjamin S. Mears =

American actor and playwright

- Born: Benjamin Stannard Mears; August 1871; Cincinnati, Ohio, U.S.
- Died: January 27, 1952 (aged 80); Cliffside Park, New Jersey, U.S.
- Other names: Ben Mears; Ben S. Mears; Stannard Mears
- Occupations: Stage actor; vaudeville performer; playwright
- Parent(s): Thomas Yeoman Mears; Sarah "Sadie" Isabelle Stannard

Benjamin Stannard Mears, also known as Ben Mears, Ben S. Mears, and Stannard Mears, (August 1871 – 27 January 1952) was an American stage actor, vaudeville performer, and playwright. He is best known for the 1918 play Seventeen; an adaptation of Booth Tarkington's 1916 novel of the same name which he co-wrote with Hugh Stanislaus Stange.

== Life and career ==
Born and raised in Cincinnati, Ohio, Benjamin Stannard Mears was the son of Thomas Yeoman Mears and Sarah "Sadie" Isabelle Stannard. He began his career as an actor in 1890. He first achieved wide recognition as an actor when he joined the 1902 national tour of William W. Young's Ben-Hur in the role of Sanballat; a work produced by Klaw & Erlanger. He remained with the production when it arrived on Broadway for the work's 1903 revival at the New York Theatre. Years later, Mears returned to the long running production in the role of Simonides.

In 1906 Mears created the leading role of Philadelphia lawyer Tom Wilson in composer Lee Orean Smith's musical Around the Clock. A successful road musical, the cast was headed by the Scottish comedian Billie Ritchie, and toured the United States and Europe for several years. The play began its tour in Syracuse, and Mears was still playing the central character of Tom Wilson when the tour reached Broadway's American Theatre in October 1906.

Mears returned to Broadway in 1913 in Carina Jordan's play Rachel at the Knickerbocker Theatre. With the playwright Hugh Stanislaus Stange he co-authored the 1918 play Seventeen and the book for the 1918 musical You Know Me Al!; both staged on Broadway.

Mears died on January 27, 1952, in Cliffside Park, New Jersey at the age of 80.

== Stage works ==
- Seventeen, play (1918), based on Booth Tarkington's 1916 novel of the same name; co-written with Hugh Stanislaus Stange; premiered at Broadway's Booth Theatre on January 22, 1918; later adapted into the 1926 musical Hello, Lola
- You Know Me Al!, musical (1918), book by Mears and Hugh Stanislaus Stange, premiere Broadway's Lexington Theatre, April 11, 1918

== Bibliography ==
- Dietz, Dan (2022). "Around the Clock". The Complete Book of 1900s Broadway Musicals. Rowman & Littlefield Publishers. ISBN 9781538168943.
- Fisher, James; Hardison Londré, Felicia (2009). The A to Z of American Theater: Modernism. Scarecrow Press. ISBN 9780810870475.
- Reeder, Thomas. "'The L-Ko Komedy Kompany': Lehrman's Baby". Mr. Suicide: Henry Pathé Lehrman and The Birth of Silent. Bear Manor Media. ISBN 978-1629331621.
- Solomon, Jon (2016). Ben-Hur: The Original Blockbuster. Edinburgh University Press. ISBN 9781474407960.
