= New York Nights (film) =

1929 film

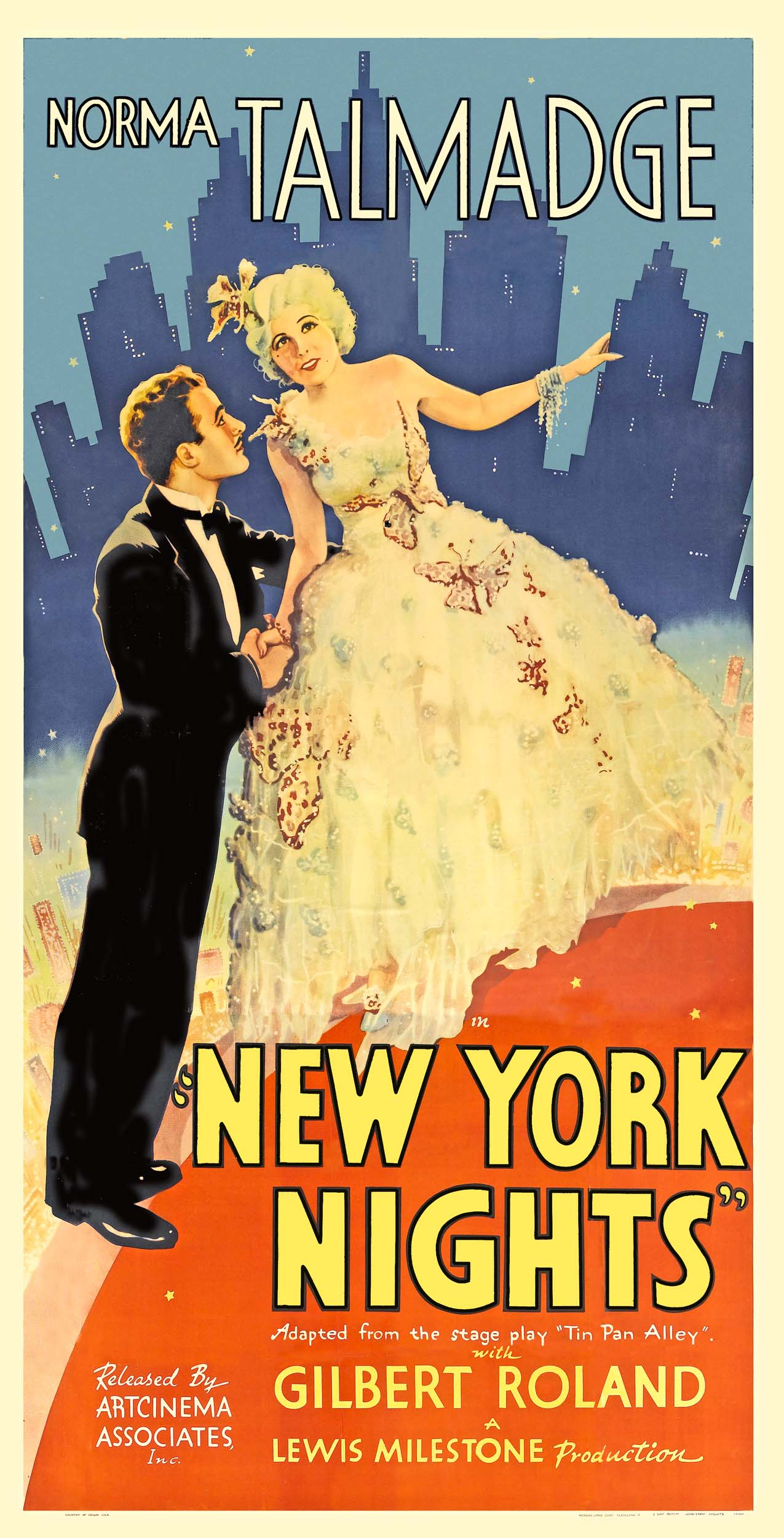
- Theatrical poster
- Directed by: Lewis Milestone
- Screenplay by: Jules Furthman
- Based on: Tin Pan Alley; 1928 play by Hugh Stanislaus Stange
- Produced by: Joseph M. Schenck; John W. Considine Jr. Norma Talmadge
- Starring: Norma Talmadge
- Cinematography: Ray June
- Edited by: Hal C. Kern
- Distributed by: United Artists
- Release date: December 28, 1929
- Running time: 81 minutes
- Country: United States
- Language: English

New York Nights is a 1929 American pre-Code crime film, directed by Lewis Milestone, and based on the 1928 play Tin Pan Alley by Hugh Stanislaus Stange. The film is known for being leading actress Norma Talmadge's first sound film.

As per U.S. copyright law, the film entered the public domain on January 1, 2025.

== Plot ==
Jill Deverne is a chorus girl married to alcoholic composer Fred. She wants to show Fred's latest song, "A Year From Today", to racketeer Joe Prividi. Prividi is the producer of the musical show in which she is working, and agrees to use his song. Fred, however, refuses any favors and rejects Prividi's offer. When Prividi uses the song anyway, Fred and his friend Johnny Dolan become drunk and show up at a nightclub.

In a raid, the police discover Fred with chorus girl Ruthie. Jill is disgusted with his behavior and dumps him. She is soon courted by Prividi, who is very overprotective. At a private party, a gambler forces himself on her and is shot by Prividi. Prividi is arrested and sent to jail. Jill does not want to be left behind, and plans a future with Fred. Prividi becomes jealous and sends gunmen to shoot and kill Fred. He is eventually stopped and put in jail, while Jill and Fred ride off in a train to start a new life.

== Cast ==
- Norma Talmadge as Jill Deverne
- Gilbert Roland as Fred Deverne
- John Wray as Joe Prividi
- Lilyan Tashman as Peggy
- Roscoe Karns as Johnny Dolan

== Music ==
"A Year From Today", the song featured in the film, was composed by Al Jolson, Dave Dreyer, and Ballard McDonald. It was sung in four different styles in the film.

== Release ==
The film was highly publicized as Talmadge's first talkie. The film, however, received generally negative reviews. Variety praised Talmadge's acting, but called the film a "stiff test" for her. Photoplay wrote that her fans would not be disappointed with her voice, but stated the story was "full of hokum".

== See also ==
- List of early sound feature films (1926–1929)
