= American Music Hall =

Former theatre in Manhattan, New York

Coordinates: 40.7568°N 73.9896°W

The American Music Hall, also known as the American Theater until 1908, was one of the oldest Broadway venues. It was built by T. Henry French. Located at 260 West 42nd Street, it was designed by the architect Charles C. Haight, with a capacity of 2,065. It opened on May 22, 1888.

By 1929, it was a Mutual burlesque house. On December 19, 1930, the interior was destroyed by a fire that started in the balcony after the evening performance of the Mutual show "Nite Life in Paris". With the Depression on, there was little interest in restoring the theater, and it was demolished in 1932.

== Partial list of notable productions ==
- La Gioconda, opera with soprano Yvonne de Tréville in the title role (1899)
- Checkers, play by Henry Blossom (1903)
- Tom, Dick and Harry (1905), musical by composer Egbert Van Alstyne with both book and lyrics co-authored by Aaron Hoffman and Harry Williams.
- Around the Clock, musical by composer Lee Orean Smith and starring comedian Billie Ritchie (1906 & 1908)
