= The Singing Cowgirl =

1938 American film

- Directed by: Samuel Diege
- Written by: Arthur Hoerl
- Produced by: George A. Hirliman (executive producer); Don Lieberman (producer)
- Starring: See below
- Cinematography: Mack Stengler
- Edited by: Guy V. Thayer Jr.
- Music by: Ross DiMaggio; Lee Zahler
- Distributed by: Grand National Pictures
- Release date: June 2, 1938
- Running time: 59 minutes
- Country: United States
- Language: English

The Singing Cowgirl is a 1938 American Western film directed by Samuel Diege.

== Cast ==
- Dorothy Page as Dorothy Hendricks
- Dave O'Brien as Dick Williams
- Vince Barnett as Kewpie
- Warner Richmond as 'Gunhand' Garrick
- Dorothy Short as Nora Pryde
- Edward Peil Sr. as Tom Harkins
- Dix Davis as Billy Harkins
- Stanley Price as John Tolen
- Paul Barrett as Rex Harkins
- Lloyd Ingraham as Dr. Slocum

== Soundtrack ==
- Dorothy Page - "I Gotta Sing" (Written by Al Sherman, Walter Kent and Milton Drake)
- Dorothy Page - "Prairie Boy" (Written by Al Sherman, Walter Kent and Milton Drake)
- Dorothy Page - "Let's Round up Our Dreams" (Written by Al Sherman, Walter Kent and Milton Drake)

== Home media ==
On October 27, 2009, Alpha Video released The Singing Cowgirl on Region 0 DVD.
