= Beatrice Maude =

American actress and theatrical director (1892–1984)

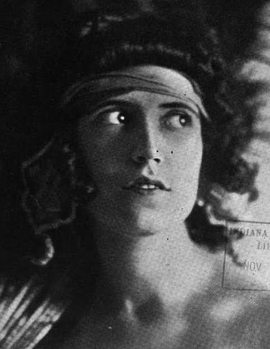
- Beatrice Maude, from a 1920 publication.
- Born: July 22, 1892; California, U.S.
- Died: October 14, 1984 (aged 92); Los Angeles, California, U.S.
- Occupation: Actress
- Years active: 1916–1956
- Parent: Maud Madison

Beatrice Maude (July 22, 1892 – October 14, 1984) was an American actress and theatrical director.

== Early life ==
Beatrice Maude was born in California. Her mother and grandmother were both actresses; her mother Maud Madison was also a dancer.

== Career ==
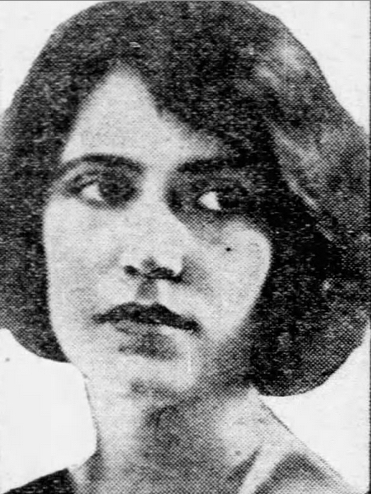
Beatrice Maude, from a 1922 publication.

Broadway appearances by Beatrice Maude included roles in The Happy Ending (1916), Seventeen (1918), Jonathan Makes a Wish (1918), A Night in Avignon (1919), George Washington (1920), in which she played Betsy Ross, The Married Woman (1921-1922), The World We Live In (1922-1923), in which she played a butterfly, Try It With Alice (1924), The Buccaneer (1925), Tragic 18 (1926), The Light of Asia (1928), Mourning Becomes Electra (1932), The Show Off (1932), and Dodsworth (1934-1935). She also played both Ophelia and Juliet in Walter Hampden's repertory company in 1920.

In 1928, Maude ran a summer stock company in Stamford, Connecticut, and hired actor Robert Montgomery. In 1932 and 1933, she was executive director of the Robin Hood Theatre in Arden, Delaware. She was co-manager of the Cape May Playhouse in 1935.

Maude acted in films, including The Final Judgment (1915, silent), Dodsworth (1936), Arkansas Judge (1941), Mr. and Mrs. Smith (1941), Born to Kill (1947), Lawless Code (1949), Slaves of Babylon (1953), Women's Prison (1955), and Invasion of the Body Snatchers (1956). On television, she played small roles on Your Favorite Story (1954), I Married Joan (1955), and I Led 3 Lives (1955).

== Personal life ==
Maude died in Los Angeles in 1984, aged 92 years. Her mother's papers including letters to Beatrice, are archived in the New York Public Library's Jerome Robbins Dance Division.
