= The Final Judgment =

1915 film by Edwin Carewe

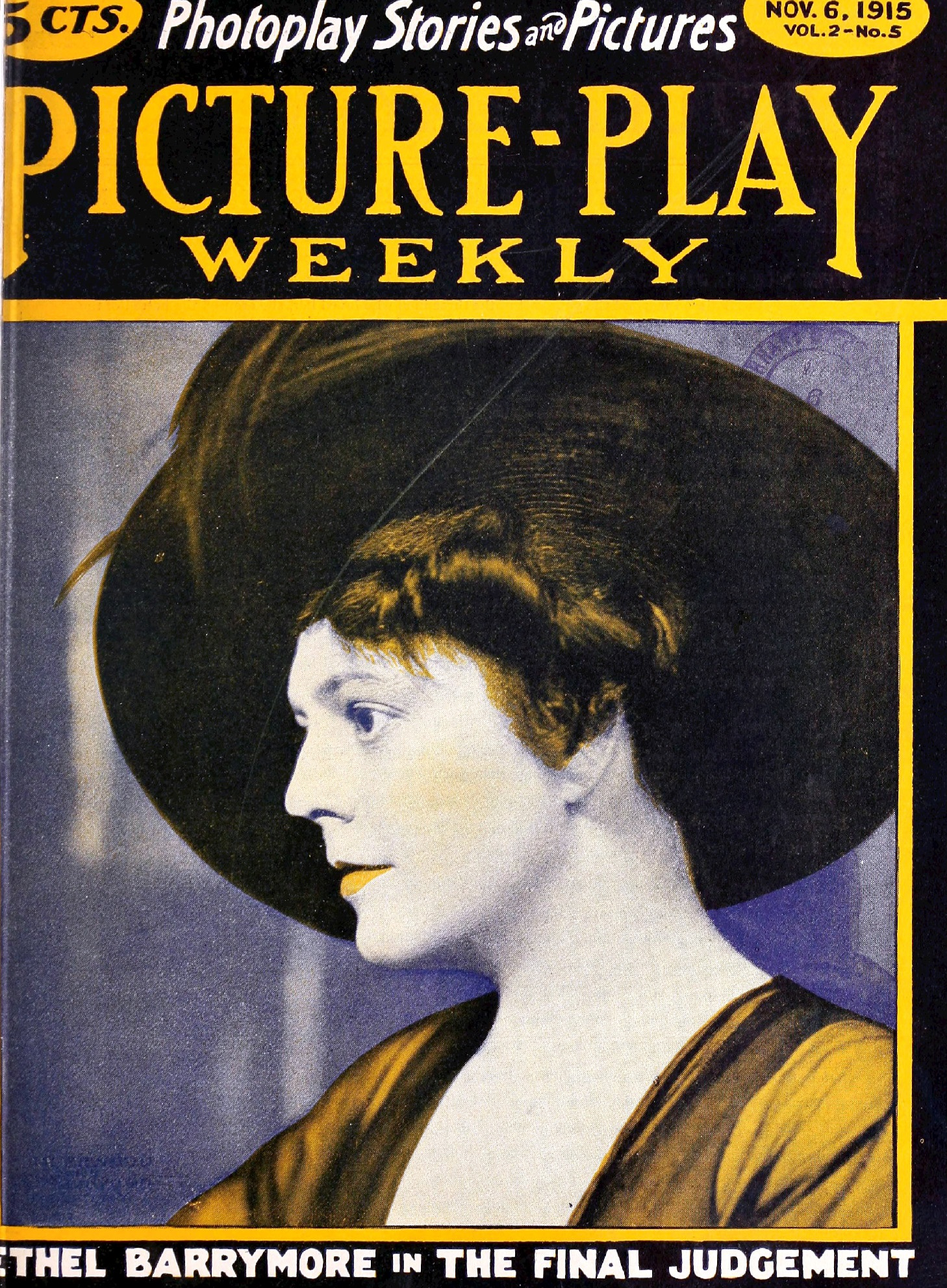
- Ethel Barrymore on cover of Picture-Play Weekly, 1915
- Directed by: Edwin Carewe
- Written by: George Scarborough (original screen story)
- Produced by: Rolfe Photoplays Incorporated (B. A. Rolfe)
- Starring: Ethel Barrymore; Mahlon Hamilton; Percy Standing
- Distributed by: Metro Pictures
- Release date: October 18, 1915
- Running time: 5 reels
- Country: United States
- Language: Silent (English intertitles)

The Final Judgment is a 1915 American silent drama film produced by B. A. Rolfe and distributed by Metro Pictures. Actor Edwin Carewe directed. It stars Ethel Barrymore in her second silent film and first as a player for then new Metro Pictures, later to become a part of Metro-Goldwyn-Mayer in 1924.

== Cast ==
- Ethel Barrymore as Jane Carleson, Mrs. Murray Campbell
- Beatrice Maude as Hortense Carleson
- Mahlon Hamilton as Murray Campbell
- H. Cooper Cliffe as Hamilton Ross
- Percy Standing as Henry Strong (credited as Percy G. Standing)
- Paul Lawrence as Doctor Perry
- M. W. Rale as Kato, valet to Ross

== Preservation ==
A complete print of The Final Judgement is held in Metro-Goldwyn-Mayer's archive.
