= Dorothy Page (actress) =

American actress

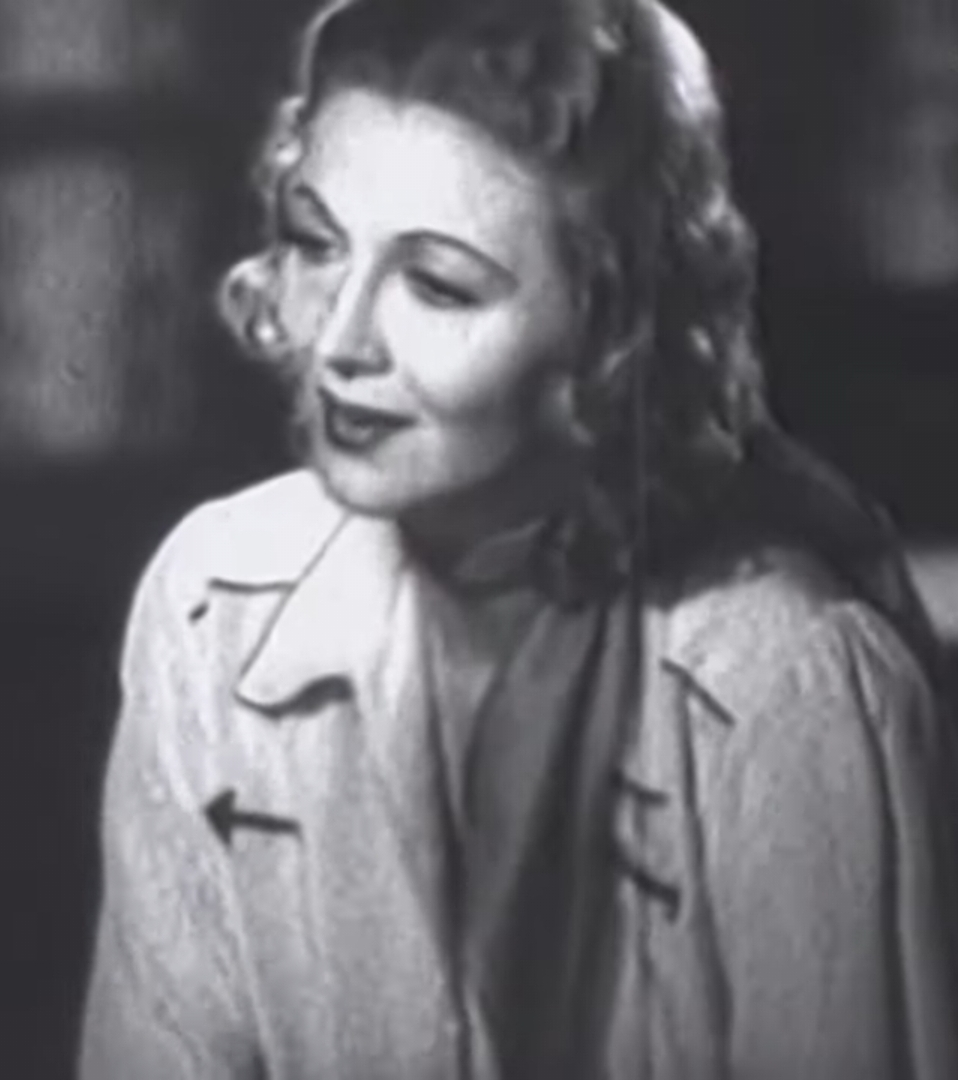
- Page in The Singing Cowgirl in 1938
- Born: Dorothy Lillian Stofflett; March 4, 1904; Northampton, Pennsylvania, U.S.
- Died: March 26, 1961 (aged 57); LaBelle, Florida, U.S.
- Occupation(s): Film actress, singer
- Spouses: Waldo Shipton, Frederick D. Leuschner, Henry Clark McCormick

Dorothy Page (March 4, 1904 – March 26, 1961), also known as The Singing Cowgirl, was a B movie film actress during the 1930s.

== Early life and education ==
Dorothy Page was born Dorothy Lillian Stofflett on March 4, 1904, in Northampton, Pennsylvania. In the 1920s, Page attended Cedar Crest College, where she majored in music. She worked as a secretary at Curtis Publishing Company and won a beauty contest during that time.

== Career ==
While still attending college, Page was chosen by the Curtis Publishing Company in the early 1920s as a model for a Saturday Evening Post cover. Her portrait, painted by artist Neysa McMein, dubbed her "One of America's Ten Most Beautiful Women".

Page intended to stay at home as a housewife and mother; however, due to financial issues at the time, her husband Waldo encouraged her to audition for Youth in America, a vocalist contest hosted by Paul Whiteman. Page was selected as the winner from amongst 700 participants. With that, her radio and singing career began, and she was soon working for NBC Radio.

By 1935, she was a regular on the Paducah Plantation, written and hosted by Irvin S. Cobb, where she played the role of Lucy Virginia. That same year, Universal Pictures signed her to a contract. Her first film was Manhattan Blue, starring opposite Ricardo Cortez, which saw moderate success. She then starred in King Solomon of Broadway opposite Edmund Lowe and Pinky Tomlin. That film was only moderately successful, and it wasn't until 1938 that she starred in another film, this time alongside Mary Boland and Ernest Truex in Mama Runs Wild. That movie also was not successful, and Page was not given any singing parts in the film.

In late 1938, Grand National Pictures announced its intention to do a series of cowboy based films utilizing a "Singing Cowgirl". The first of these was Water Rustlers in 1939, starring Page and Dave O'Brien. Unfortunately, the movie-going public did not accept a woman in the lead role of a western.

Ride 'Em Cowgirl was released next in 1939, and fared even worse than the first. Later that same year, The Singing Cowgirl was released, in which Page again starred with O'Brien. It would be the last film by Grand National Pictures, and shortly thereafter they went out of business.

In 1947, Page appeared on Broadway in the drama Dear Judas.

== Personal life ==
On July 3, 1925, at age 21, Page married Waldo Shipton of Detroit, a doctor she met in college at Cedar Crest College. The couple had two daughters by 1929, but divorced in 1932.

Later, she married Los Angeles attorney Frederick D. Leuschner in 1939, and they resided at his ranch in Tarzana, California. During this marriage, Page began purchasing run-down Hollywood homes in order to remodel and sell them for profit. Leuschner died on December 8, 1941, at the age of thirty-six, from heart failure.

She then married Henry Clark McCormick of Fresno, California. Page bought a 1700-acre 1,700-acre (6.9 km^{2}) cotton ranch in Pecos, Texas, and harvested the cotton there. The couple divorced after she was diagnosed with cancer.

Page died in LaBelle, Florida, from cancer on March 26, 1961, at age 57.

== Homage ==
In one of Columbo's episodes ("Ashes to Ashes", Season 10 Episode 12), she may have been portrayed in the character of Dorothea Page, the deceased silent film star from whom Patrick McGoohan (in his role as Eric Prince, funeral director to the stars) stole a valuable diamond off her deceased body. Portraying her in this episode as a silent movie star may have been to show the way society in the late 1930s wanted to silence the "Singing Cowgirl".
