= Water Rustlers =

1939 film

- Original film poster
- Directed by: Samuel Diege
- Written by: Lawrence Meade (story); Don Laurie (story); Arthur Hoerl (screenplay)
- Produced by: George A. Hirliman (executive producer); Don Lieberman (producer)
- Starring: See below
- Cinematography: Mack Stengler (director of photography)
- Edited by: Guy V. Thayer Jr. (as Guy Thayer)
- Distributed by: Grand National Films
- Release date: January 6, 1939
- Running time: 54 minutes
- Country: United States
- Language: English

Water Rustlers is a 1939 American Western film directed by Samuel Diege. It was the first of three Dorothy Page singing cowgirl films for Grand National Films.

== Plot ==
Mr. Weylan purchases land in order to keep the water supply for himself, originally for hydraulic mining. His long term scheme is when all the ranches fail due to their cattle having no water, he can buy their land cheaply and sell it to a meat company.

Weylan gets his way through fair means, such as having his lawyers getting the rancher's case thrown out of court, as well as foul means such as his henchmen murdering Shirley Martin's father and preventing witnesses to testify. Shirley takes the law into her own hands to lead the ranchers in their fight for justice.

== Cast ==
- Dorothy Page as Shirley Martin
- Dave O'Brien as Bob Lawson
- Vince Barnett as Mike, the cook
- Stanley Price as Robert Weylan
- Ethan Allen as Tim Martin
- Leonard Trainor as Andy Jurgens, rancher
- Warner Richmond as Wiley, crooked foreman
- Edward R. Gordon as Henchman Herman
- Edward Peil Sr. as Lawyer
- Lloyd Ingraham as Judge
- Merrill McCormick as Sheriff

== Production ==
Grand National Pictures lost their top singing cowboy star Tex Ritter to Monogram Pictures. In what was planned to be a series of six musicals, Page filmed three films with a shooting time of five days each from August to October 1938. All were directed by Samuel Diege who died of a heart attack in October 1939.

== Soundtrack ==
- Dorothy Page -"Let's Go On Like This Forever" (Written by Al Sherman)
- Dorothy Page - "When a Cowboy Sings a Dogie Lullaby" (Written by Walter Kent)
- Dorothy Page - "I Feel at Home in the Saddle" (Written by Milton Drake)
