= Stuart Walker (director) =

American director and producer (1888–1941)

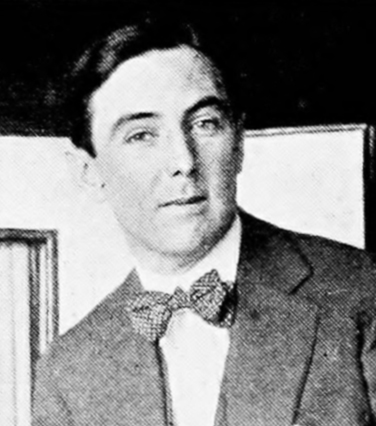
- Walker in 1919
- Born: Stuart Armstrong Walker; March 4, 1888; Augusta, Kentucky, U.S.
- Died: March 14, 1941 (aged 53); Beverly Hills, California, U.S.
- Education: University of Cincinnati
- Occupations: Director; producer

Stuart Armstrong Walker (March 4, 1888 – March 13, 1941) was an American director and producer in theatre and motion pictures.

== Biography ==
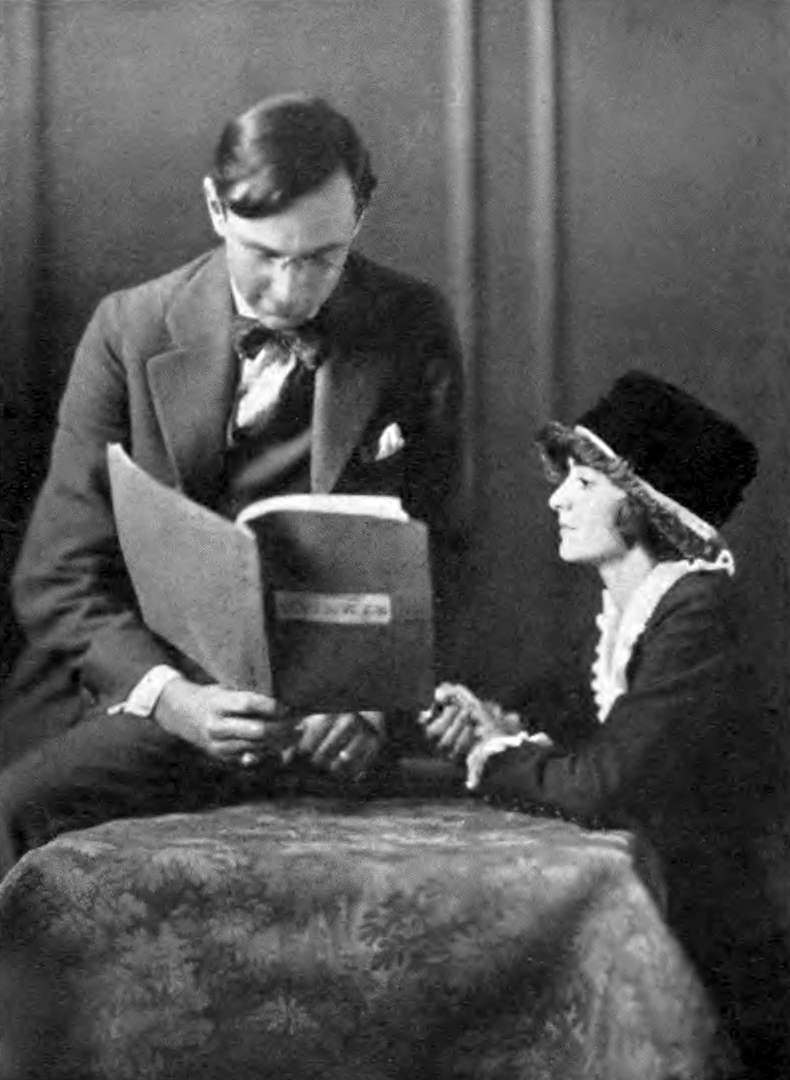
Walker reading the stage adaptation of Booth Tarkington's Seventeen with actress Lillian Ross, who played the role of Jane in the Broadway production (1918)

Stuart Walker was born March 4, 1888, in Augusta, Kentucky, the son of Cliff Stuart Walker and Matilda Taliaferro Armstrong Walker. After attending public school in Cincinnati and graduating from the University of Cincinnati, he went to work for David Belasco and made his debut as an actor in 1909. He became a play reader for Belasco, and directed plays including The Governor's Lady (1912). In 1914 Walker joined Jessie Bonstelle as a director in Detroit and Buffalo.

In 1915, Walker organized the Portmanteau Theatre, an independent repertory theatre company. He produced seasons in Baltimore, Chicago, Cincinnati, Dayton, Indianapolis, Louisville and New York City. He staged the first dramatization of Booth Tarkington's bestselling novel Seventeen, presented on Broadway in 1918 starring Gregory Kelly and his future wife, newcomer Ruth Gordon.

Walker's repertory company was active throughout the 1920s. Its credits include the first American performance of Alberto Casella's supernatural drama Death Takes a Holiday, adapted by Walter Ferris, in 1929.

In 1930, Walker became a screenwriter in Hollywood, and served as dialogue director on films including Brothers and The Last of the Lone Wolf. He directed his first feature film the following year, and in 1936 he became a producer for Paramount Pictures.

Walker died March 13, 1941, at his home in Beverly Hills, California, following a heart attack.

== Filmography ==
=== Director ===
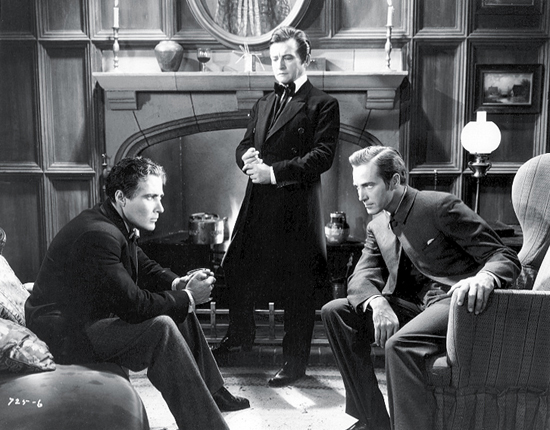
Douglass Montgomery, Claude Rains and David Manners in The Mystery of Edwin Drood (1935)

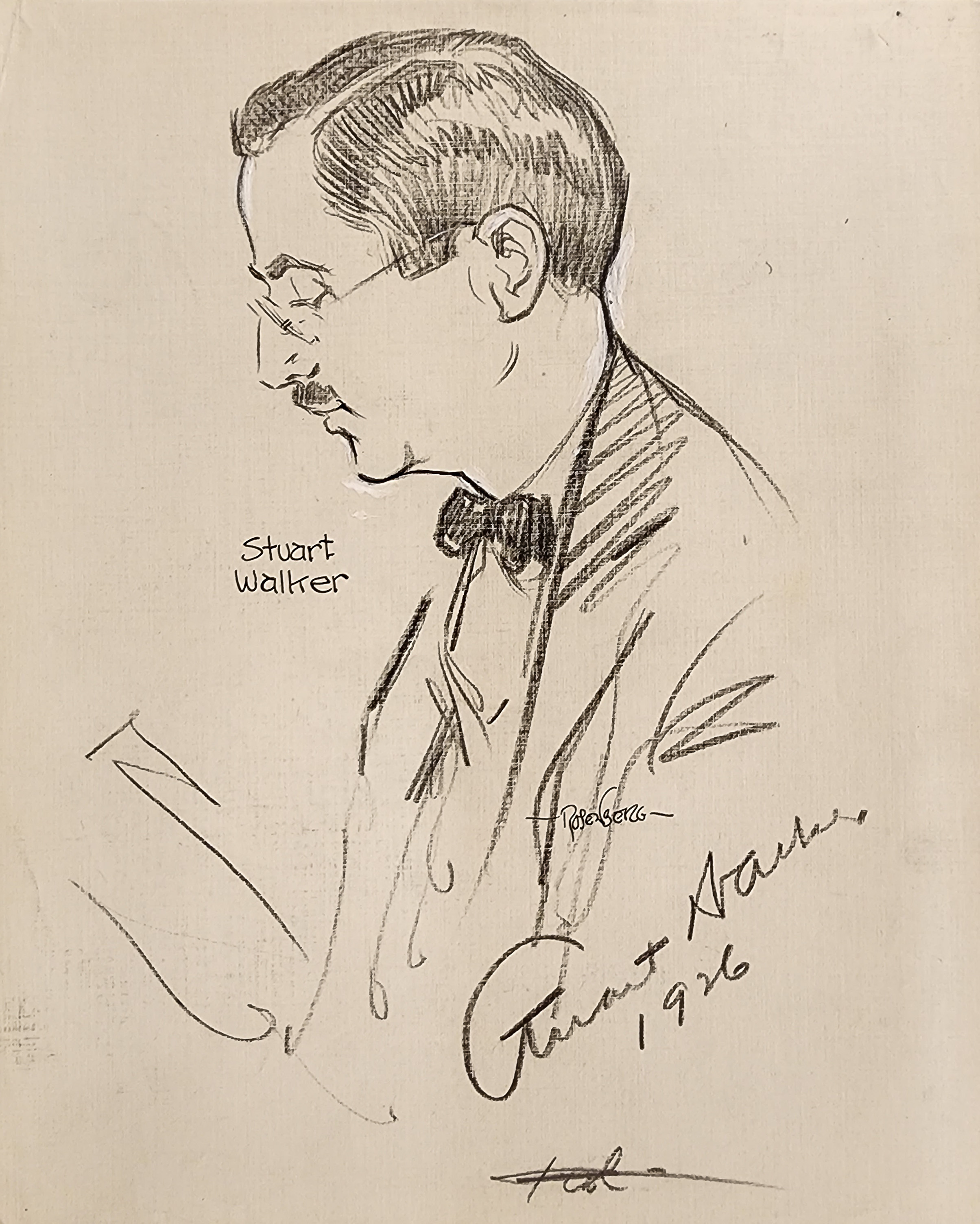
Signed drawing of Stuart Walker by Manuel Rosenberg for the Cincinnati Post 1926

Year	Title	Notes
1931	The Secret Call	
1931	The False Madonna	
1932	The Misleading Lady	
1932	Evenings for Sale	
1932	Tonight Is Ours	
1933	The Eagle and the Hawk	
1933	White Woman	
1934	Romance in the Rain	
1934	Great Expectations	
1935	The Mystery of Edwin Drood	
1935	Werewolf of London	
1935	Manhattan Moon	

=== Producer ===
Year	Title	Notes
1937	Bulldog Drummond Escapes	Associate producer, uncredited
1937	Wild Money	Uncredited
1937	Sophie Lang Goes West	Uncredited
1937	Bulldog Drummond Comes Back	Uncredited
1938	Bulldog Drummond's Revenge	Uncredited
1938	Bulldog Drummond's Peril	Uncredited
1938	Hunted Men	Associate producer, uncredited
1938	Prison Farm	Associate producer, uncredited
1938	Sons of the Legion	Associate producer, uncredited
1938	Arrest Bulldog Drummond	
1939	Disbarred	Associate producer
1939	King of Chinatown	Associate producer, uncredited
1939	Bulldog Drummond's Bride	Associate producer
1940	Emergency Squad	Associate producer, uncredited
1940	Seventeen	Associate producer, uncredited; screenwriter
1940	Opened by Mistake	Associate producer, uncredited
