= Around the Clock =

1906 musical

Around the Clock is a musical in three acts with music by Lee Orean Smith, a book by Steve B. Cassin, and lyrics by J. Sebastian Hiller. The work was created as a starring vehicle for the Scottish comedian Billie Ritchie. A successful "road musical" which premiered in 1906, the work toured extensively for several years for performances in the United States and Europe; including two stints at theaters on Broadway in 1906 and 1908. The show was still touring as late as 1913. Set in Philadelphia, the loose plot takes place inside a music hall and on a vaudeville stage.

== History ==
Around the Clock was created by composer Lee Orean Smith, lyricist J. Sebastian Hiller, and writer Steve B. Cassin for Ritchie's London Pantomime Company (later renamed "Billie Ritchie's London Comedy Company"); a theatre troupe founded by comedian Billie Ritchie and managed by vaudeville entrepreneur Gus Hill. Hill produced the show, and the other members of the production team included director M. L. Heckert, choreographer Dan Dody, costume designer Will R. Barnes, and set designers Ernest Albert, Frank E. Gates and Edward A. Morange.

Around the Clock premiered in Syracuse, New York in October 1906 before moving to Broadway. The work's NYC premiere took place at the American Theatre on October 29, 1906 where the work was engaged for a week-long run of eight performances through November 3, 1906. The production then continued on a two year-long tour, ultimately returning to Broadway for further performances at the American Theatre in January 1908. A successful "road musical", the show was revived for another long tour from 1911 through 1913.

The original cast of Around the Clock included Billie Ritchie as the town drunk, Billie Smith; Benjamin S. Mears as the lawyer, Tom Wilson; Joe F. Willard as Tom's uncle, Hank Wilson; Sallie Stembler as Hank's fiancé and later Tom's wife, Nellie Wilson; C.F. Cardon as Nellie's father, Deacon Mayfield; Sid Franklin as Emile Muller; Eda Maley as Mrs. Muller; Rich McAllister as the mischievous bell boy, Johnny Mack; Winifred Francis as the maid, Susie; Rhea Marble as the dancer, Helen Desmond; Jessie LeRoy as the dancer and Helen's sister, Viola Desmond; Leon Kahn as the magician, Professor Boni de Burro; James E. Garvin as the stage manager, Ben Speal; Jack Lloyd as the waiter, Edwin Uptown; Nellie Mason as the singer, Diana Morley; Ken Rodgers as the referee, George Siller; Arthur Spears as the elocutionist, Gene Holbrook; Harry Taylor as Pardello; Nina Vernon as the program girl, Tillie; and Dora Dean as Tillie's assistant, Marie.

== Plot ==
Around the Clock had a loose plot that centers around the young Philadelphia lawyer Tom Wilson. Tom's uncle, Hank Wilson, is currently residing in a remote part of Asia and is engaged to Nellie who lives in the same city as Tom. Hank tasks Tom with assisting him in courting Nellie while he is abroad, and the two attend a music hall performance where they end up falling in love. Nellie marries Tom instead of Hank, and conflict ensues upon Hank's return; with all issues resolving happily by the end of act 2. The drunk Billie Smith provides humorous commentary and physical comedy throughout and is the true star of the show. The final act is essentially a show within a show, with the characters viewing a vaudeville production.

== Bibliography ==
- Bloom, Ken (1996). "Around the Clock". American Song: A-S. Schirmer Books. ISBN 9780028645735.
- Bordman, Gerald Martin; Norton, Richard (2010). American Musical Theatre: A Chronicle. Oxford University Press. ISBN 9780199729708.
- Dietz, Dan (2022). "Around the Clock". The Complete Book of 1900s Broadway Musicals. Rowman & Littlefield Publishers. ISBN 9781538168943.
- Reeder, Thomas. "'The L-Ko Komedy Kompany': Lehrman's Baby". Mr. Suicide: Henry Pathé Lehrman and The Birth of Silent. Bear Manor Media. ISBN 978-1629331621.
