= Seventeen (Tarkington novel) =

Humorous novel by Booth Tarkington

Seventeen: A Tale of Youth and Summer Time and the Baxter Family Especially William
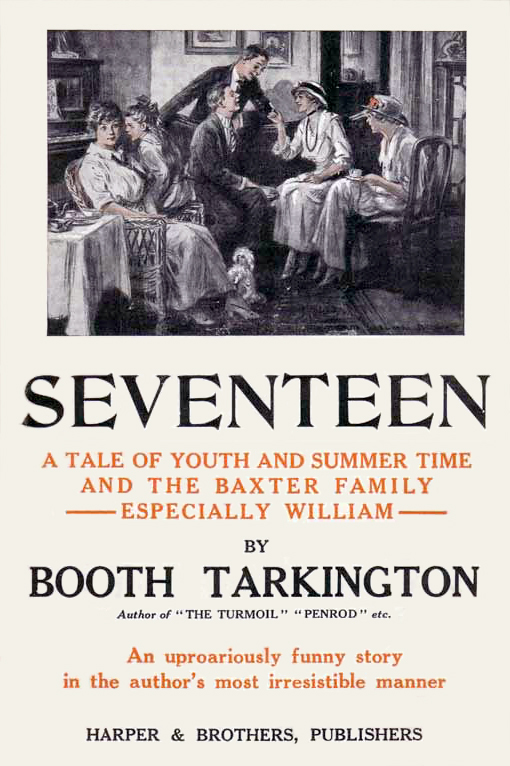
- First edition
- Author: Booth Tarkington
- Language: English
- Publisher: Harper and Brothers
- Publication date: March 1916
- Publication place: United States
- Media type: Print (Hardcover)
- Pages: 329 pp (first edition, hardback)
- OCLC: 2022948
- LC Class: PS2972

Seventeen: A Tale of Youth and Summer Time and the Baxter Family Especially William is a humorous novel by Booth Tarkington that gently satirizes first love, in the person of a callow 17-year-old, William Sylvanus Baxter. Seventeen takes place in a small city in the Midwestern United States shortly before World War I. It was published as sketches in the Metropolitan Magazine in 1915 and 1916, and collected in a single volume by Harper and Brothers in 1916, when it was the bestselling novel in the United States.

== Plot summary ==
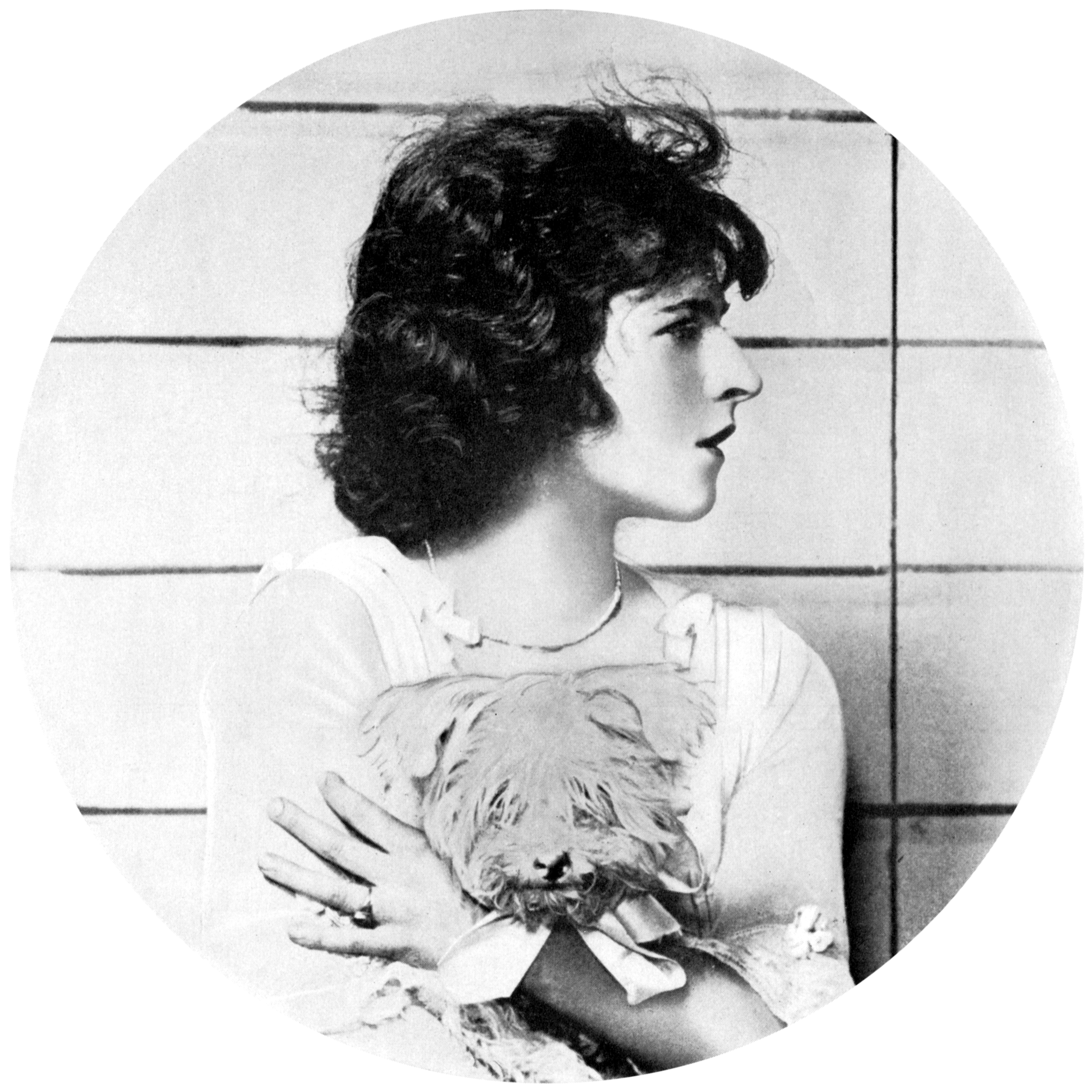
Ruth Gordon as Lola Pratt in the Broadway production of Seventeen (1918)

The middle-class Baxter family enjoys a comfortable and placid life until the summer when their neighbors, the Parcher family, play host to an out-of-town visitor, Lola Pratt. An aspiring actress, Lola is a "howling belle of eighteen" who talks baby-talk "even at breakfast" and holds the center of attention wherever she goes. She instantly captivates William with her beauty, her flirtatious manner, and her ever-present prop, a tiny white lap dog, Flopit. William is sure he has found true love at last. Like the other youths of his circle, he spends the summer pursuing Lola at picnics, dances and evening parties, inadvertently making himself obnoxious to his family and friends. They, in turn, constantly embarrass and humiliate him as, time after time, he stumbles into ridiculous, embarrassing situations brought on by his own careless actions.

William steals his father's dress-suit and wears it to court Lola in the evenings at the home of the soon-regretful Parcher family. As his lovestruck condition progresses, he writes a bad love poem to "Milady", hoards dead flowers Lola has touched, and develops, his family feels, a peculiar interest in beards and child marriages among the 'Hindoos'. To William's constant irritation, his ten-year-old sister Jane and the Baxters' Negro handyman, Genesis, persist in treating him as an equal instead of the serious-minded grown-up he now believes himself to be. His mother mostly smiles tolerantly at William's lovelorn condition and hopes he will survive it to become a responsible, mature adult, while his father is in a constant state of dismay over his son's childish, self-centered behavior and talk.

After a summer that William is sure has changed his life forever, Lola leaves town on the train. The book concludes with a Maeterlinck-inspired flash-forward, showing that William has indeed survived the trials of adolescence.

== Reviews ==
On the book's publication, The New York Times gave it a full-page review, calling it a "delicious lampoon" and praising it as "a notable study of the psychology of the boy in his latter teens."

Most reviewers have seen Seventeen as humorously truthful. A contemporary reviewer wrote, “Every man and woman over fifty ought to read Seventeen. It is not only a skillful analysis of adolescent love, it is, with all its side-splitting mirth, a tragedy. No mature person who reads this novel will ever seriously regret his lost youth or wish he were young again....” “As funny, but sadder than Penrod, it has the same insight into how it feels to be young.” In a review of the 1951 stage version, New York Times theater critic Brooks Atkinson called it a “humorous and touching story of adolescence…It has a touch of immortality that most popular works lack. Fundamentally it is true.”

Other reviewers fault the book for not being realistic. “Real adolescence, like any other age of man, has its own passions, its own poetry, its own tragedies and felicities; the adolescence of Mr. Tarkington's tales is almost nothing but farce staged for outsiders.”

Reviewers have suggested that Willie Baxter could be an older Penrod. Seventeen and Penrod are similar in structure; both are collections of sketches, and some characters and situations from Penrod are recycled in Seventeen: “[m]any of the characters are parallel...There are whole episodes that are similar…”

F.S.Fitzgerald has mentioned "Seventeen" in his personal "10 best books" he ever read list as "The funniest book I’ve ever read".

== Legacy ==
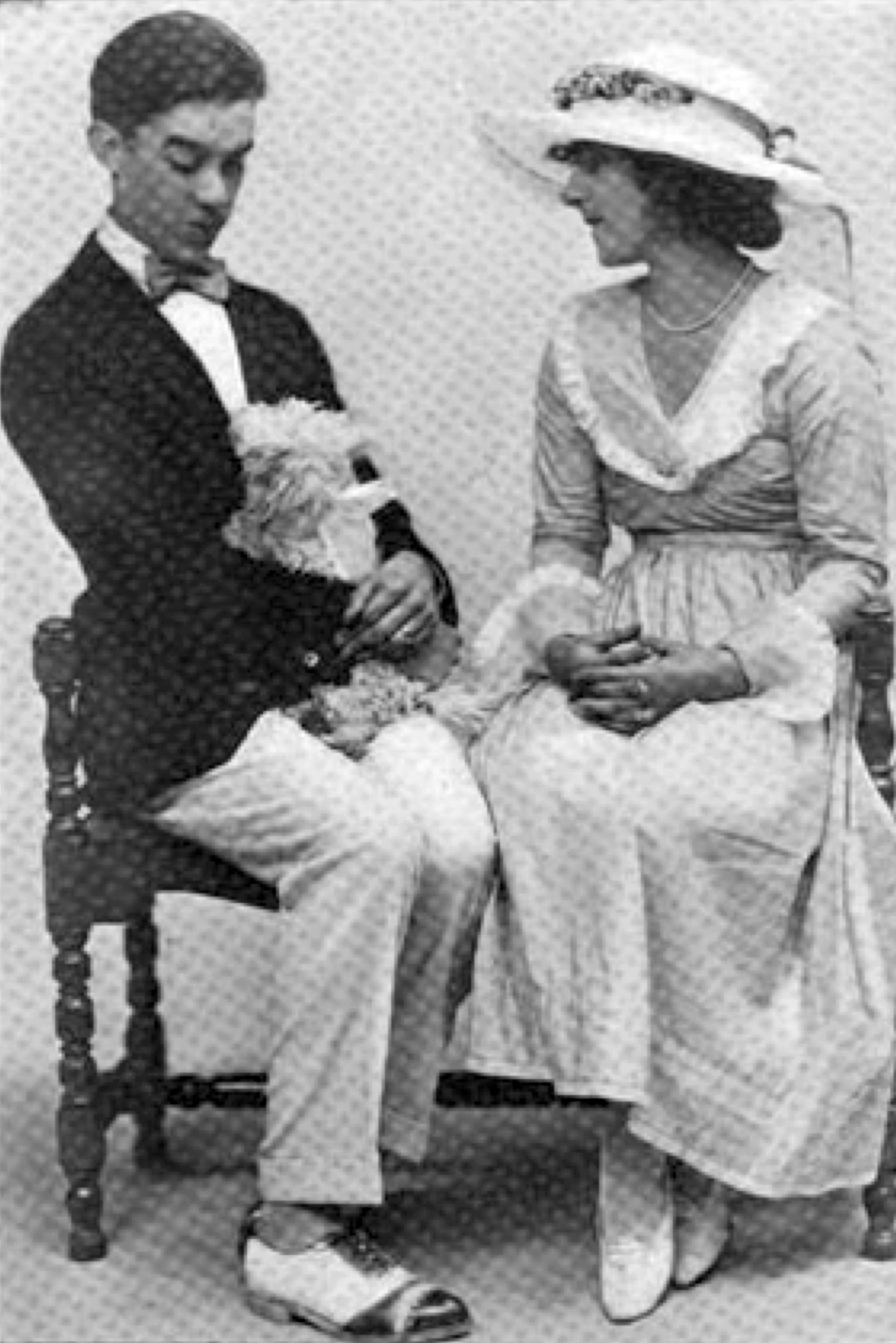
Gregory Kelly and Ruth Gordon in the Broadway production of Seventeen (1918)

- Silent film Seventeen in 1916, with Jack Pickford and Louise Huff.
- The stage play Seventeen, adapted by Hugh Stanislaus Stange, Stannard Mears, and Stuart Walker, first produced in 1917 with Gregory Kelly and Ruth Gordon.
- Musical comedy Hello, Lola, based on the 1918 play, produced in New York City in 1926.
- Radio adaptation by Orson Welles and The Mercury Theatre on the Air, October 16, 1938.
- Film Seventeen in 1940, with Jackie Cooper and Betty Field.
- Musical Seventeen, adapted by Sally Benson, produced in New York City in 1951, with Kenneth Nelson and Ann Crowley.
- Seventeen an early teen magazine named for the novel.
