= Hugh Stanislaus Stange =

American dramatist

- Born: June 28, 1894; New York City, New York, United States
- Died: January 1966 (aged 71); Miami, Florida, United States
- Occupations: Playwright, screenwriter
- Years active: 1918-1935
- Notable work: Veneer; Tin Pan Alley

Hugh Stanislaus Stange (1894–1966) was an American playwright and screenwriter known for what was once described as a "drab realism" in melodramas and crime stories in the 1920s and 1930s. Several of his plays were adapted for the cinema.

== Early life ==
Born in New York, Stange was the son of the Broadway musical theatre writer and director Stanislaus Stange. Hugh followed in his father's footsteps, creating and adapting works for the popular theatre. From 1917, he served in the army in World War I. During his military service, he helped to put on entertainments.

His first major success as a playwright was with Seventeen in 1918, which he co-wrote with Stannard Mears. The play was based on the novel by Booth Tarkington.

== 1920s ==
By the 1920s, Stange was increasingly interested in social realism. According to Theatre Magazine, Stange's plays at this time were influenced by the early work of Eugene O'Neill. His play Tin Pan Alley (1924) was a melodrama about infidelity among theatre folk. It was adapted in 1929 as the film New York Nights, starring Norma Talmadge, The play was updated and filmed a second time in 1984, with Corinne Wahl in the lead role.

Similar themes were explored in Veneer (1929), the story of a naive girl who falls for a man with confident veneer, but who turns out to be a worthless braggart. It has been described as a "well-written, if downbeat, slice of New York life". Joanna Roos and Henry Hull took the leading roles; Spencer Tracy replaced Hull later in the run. This was also adapted for film, as Young Bride, starring Helen Twelvetrees.

== 1930s ==
In 1930 he wrote and produced The Long Road, about a soldier in World War I whose wife has a child by another man while he is fighting in France. The Brooklyn Daily Eagle lamented the solemnity of the play, writing that "Mr. Stange writes with a face a yard long...The play is a rather sickening display of affected fine feeling". In the following year he collaborated with John Golden on After Tomorrow, about a young couple whose marriage is repeatedly delayed. Stange had written the original draft as a tragedy, but Golden gave it a more upbeat character. Knowing Stange's work, the reviewer in Outlook and Independent magazine suspected that before Golden had livened it up, the play would have been "terribly terribly sincere with little if any humour to lighten its drab realism". This play was also later filmed. False Dreams, Farewell (1933) was a portmanteau drama in the manner of Grand Hotel, set on board a Titanic-like cruise-liner that was destined to sink on its maiden voyage.

His screenplay credits included The Black Camel (1931), a Charlie Chan mystery.

Stange also wrote a number of crime-based dramas including Fogbound and Headquarters (subtitled "the dramatization of the hidden police records in a famous crime"). Mother Sings (1935) was a drama that prefigures Psycho, portraying the lurid story of a boy who grows up to be a murderer after being psychologically poisoned against women by his deranged mother.
