= Lee Orean Smith =

American musician and composer (1874–1942)

- Born: August 9, 1874; Crawfordsville, Indiana
- Died: April 6, 1942 (aged 67); Flushing, New York

Lee Orean Smith (August 9, 1874 – April 6, 1942) was an American composer, arranger, music editor, publisher, music teacher, multi-instrumentalist, and conductor. A diverse composer who began his career writing Tin Pan Alley songs and music for the theatre, he later had a prolific output of published band and orchestral works; both arrangements and original pieces. He published music not only under his own name, but also under numerous pseudonyms, including Calvin Grooms, Maurice Lee, Leon Obrero, José Santos, Leopold Lamont, and François Chevalier. Smith composed music for multiple works staged on Broadway, and was the longtime managing editor of the band and orchestra department in the music publishing firm of Leo Feist. At the time of his death he was an editor for Carl Fischer Music.

== Life and career ==
Born in Crawfordsville, Indiana on August 9, 1874, Lee Orean Smith's father was the musical director of a theatre orchestra. In his youth he was trained as a pianist and on multiple string and brass instruments. He played the violin, viola, and cello in his father's orchestra, and multiple instruments in a local brass band.

Smith earned degrees from Wabash College and DePauw University before pursuing further studies in music theory at the Indianapolis Conservatory of Music (founded 1889, closed in the 1960s). Because of his prior training and knowledge from his father, he completed the four year music theory degree in just one year, and was subsequently appointed to the faculty of the conservatory as the chair of both the theory and violin departments, and as an assistant faculty member in the piano department. While teaching, Smith also worked as a violinist, violist, cellist, and double bassist in several theatre orchestras in Indianapolis; ultimately working as a conductor as well.

Smith's experience in Indianapolis theaters re-oriented his career away from teaching, and he became a conductor and composer for several touring opera and musical theatre troupes for a 15-year period. Considered a Tin Pan Alley composer, several of his songs from these works were published. This included the music for Charlotte Blair Parker's 1901 play Under Southern Skies, a work which was staged at Broadway's Theatre Republic in addition to touring the United States. The title song from that play "Under Southern Skies (A Song of the South)" was published by Vandersloot Music in 1902, and was the first of many Tin Pan Alley songs to present an idealized and glorified version of "Dixie".

Smith composed the music for the 1906 musical Around the Clock; a work created for the Scottish comedian Billie Ritchie. A tremendously successful "road musical", the work toured the United States and Europe; first from 1906 to 1908, and then again from 1911 to 1913. The tour included two stops at Broadway's American Theatre in 1906 and 1908.

After his career as a theatre conductor ended, Smith worked for more than two decades as the managing editor of the band and orchestra department in the music publishing firm of Leo Feist. He left that position to become an editor for Carl Fischer Music; a post he held at the time of his death at the age of 67. In 1938 he served as a judge for the New York Philharmonic's composition competition.

Smith's work as a composer was not limited to songs for the theatre and Tin Pan Alley. Indeed, his most prolific output was as a composer and arranger of orchestral and band music. In addition to publishing music under his own name, he used multiple pseudonyms. He utilized the name Calvin Grooms for some original works but mostly for arrangements; and the name Maurice Lee was used for violin solos. For music composed in a Spanish-style he adopted the pseudonyms Leon Obrero and José Santos. He used the names Leopold Lamont and François Chevalier for pieces written in a French-style.

Lee Orean Smith died on April 6, 1942, in Flushing, New York.

== Partial list of compositions ==
=== Stage works ===
- Under Southern Skies (1901, play with music, playwright Charlotte Blair Parker)
- Around the Clock (1906, musical, book by Steve B. Cassin, and lyrics by J. Sebastian Hiller)

=== Wind ensemble ===
- Campin' on de Old Swanee (1899)
- When a Lady Leads the Band (1903)
- Bohemiana (1909)
- Valse Celesta (1915)
- Carnival Queen Waltz (1916)

== Bibliography ==
- Bush Jones, John (2015). Reinventing Dixie: Tin Pan Alley's Songs and the Creation of the Mythic South. Louisiana State University Press. ISBN 9780807159453.
- Dietz, Dan (2022). "Around the Clock". The Complete Book of 1900s Broadway Musicals. Rowman & Littlefield Publishers. ISBN 9781538168943.
- Diodato Bzowski, Frances (1992). American Women Playwrights, 1900-1930: A Checklist. Bloomsbury Academic. ISBN 9780313242380.
- Reeder, Thomas (27 May 2017). "'The L-Ko Komedy Kompany': Lehrman's Baby". Mr. Suicide: Henry Pathé Lehrman and The Birth of Silent. Bear Manor Media. ISBN 978-1629331621.
- Rehrig, William H.; Bierley, Paul E. (1991). "Lee Orean Smith". The Heritage Encyclopedia of Band Music: Composers and Their Music, Volume II. Integrity Press. ISBN 9780918048080.
