= Seventeen (1916 film) =

1916 film by Robert G. Vignola

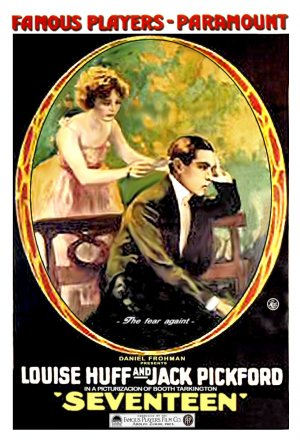
- Theatrical release poster
- Directed by: Robert G. Vignola
- Screenplay by: Booth Tarkington; Harvey F. Thew
- Based on: Seventeen by Booth Tarkington
- Produced by: Daniel Frohman
- Starring: Louise Huff; Jack Pickford
- Production company: Famous Players Film Company
- Distributed by: Paramount Pictures
- Release date: November 2, 1916
- Running time: 50 minutes
- Country: United States
- Languages: Silent film English intertitles

Seventeen is a lost 1916 American comedy silent film directed by Robert G. Vignola and written by Booth Tarkington and Harvey F. Thew. It is based on Tarkington's novel of the same name which was published earlier the same year. The film stars Louise Huff, Jack Pickford, Winifred Allen, Madge Evans, Walter Hiers, and Dick Lee. The film was released on November 2, 1916, by Paramount Pictures.

== Plot ==
William Sylvanus Baxter has reached the age of 17, deluded himself into believing that he really ought to shave, and renounced "women" for all time. But the arrival of Lola Pratt and her toy dog Floppit reduces him to the final stages of adoration and subjugation. Having become Miss Pratt's abject slave, William becomes conscious of the defects of his 10-year-old sister Jane, who wolfs down all the bread and applesauce in the world, dresses too scantily in hot weather to suit his rigorous code, and comports herself in a manner that is trying to a young man in love. William's first humiliation comes when he encounters Miss Pratt and Floppit while assisting the hired man, Genesis, to carry home a second-hand wash-boiler. William flees in horror. At the first party given by his old, somewhat scorned friend May Parcher in honor of Miss Pratt, William surreptitiously dons his father's dress suit to counteract the effect of George Cooper's handsome new roadster, which seems to greatly impress Miss Pratt. But he is doomed to humiliation by the arrival of Genesis who announced that Mr. Baxter wants William to bring his clothes back at once. There is another party at the Parchers', in anticipation of which Mrs. Baxter has hidden her husband's dress clothes from William, so he finds himself without suitable apparel and is only relieved when his mother relents, but he arrives so late that Miss Pratt's dance card is completely full. But she takes pity on William and sits out a dance with him, during which she agrees to elope with him just for the fun of it. William takes the appointment seriously and gets a roadster by telling the salesman that he wants to test it out for his father; meanwhile, Miss Pratt decides to elope with George in his car. When they reach the minister's house they discover that George has forgotten the license, and the quarrel that follows shatters their romance. William, hastening in his new car to keep the appointment, rams a tree and wrecks the machine. Rushing ahead on foot, he arrives at the designated spot only to find May Parcher there with the news of Miss Pratt's elopement. Nothing is left for William but suicide and he prepares to die at home by the gas method, planning to save his good name by willing his dead body to the dental college, the proceeds to go to pay for the damage to the automobile. May Parcher's timely arrival with $50, collected by the sale of her pet pony, saves William from the terrible consequences of his despair, and in his gratitude to May for her devotion is the seed of a new romance.—Moving Picture World synopsis

== Cast ==
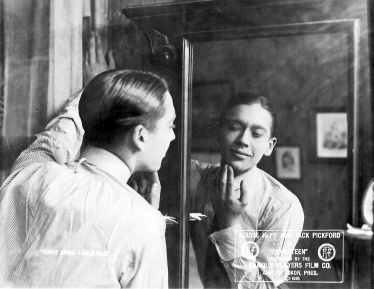
Jack Pickford in Seventeen

- Louise Huff as Lola Pratt
- Jack Pickford as William Sylvanus Baxter
- Winifred Allen as May Parcher
- Madge Evans as Jane Baxter
- Walter Hiers as George Cooper
- Dick Lee as Genesis
- Richard Rosson as Johnny Watson
- Julian Dillon as Joe Bullit
- Helen Lindroth as Mrs. Baxter
- Tony Merlo as Mr. Baxter
- Rudolph Valentino (uncredited)
