= Billie Ritchie =

Scottish comedian (1878–1921)

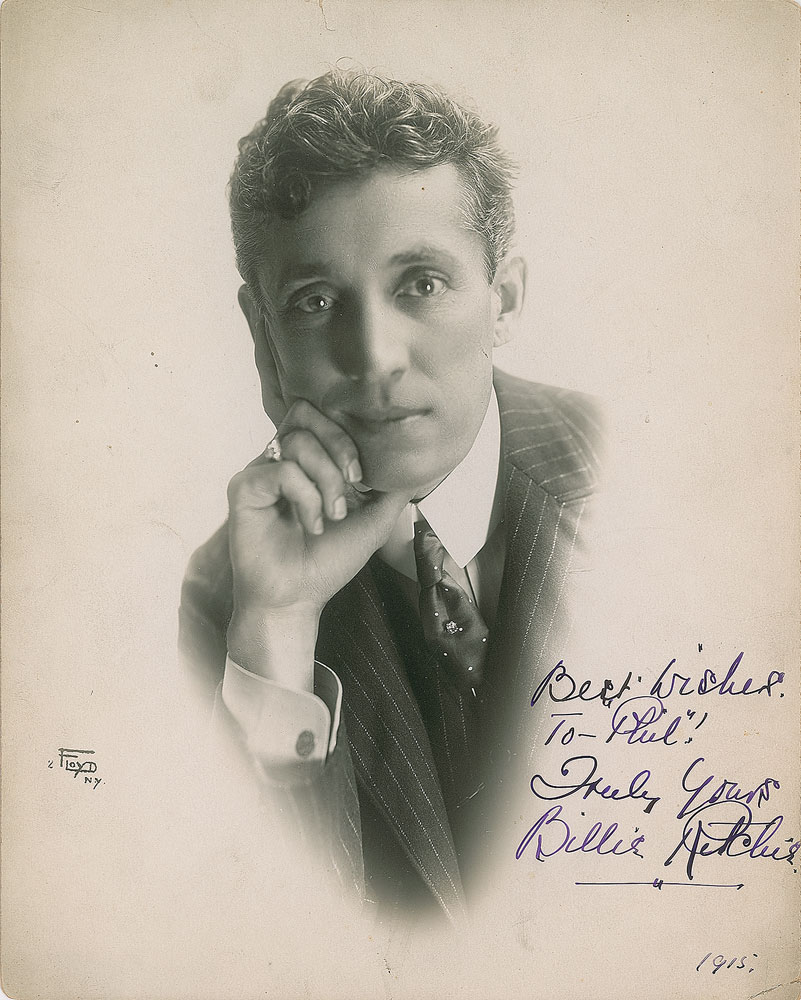
- Inscribed to Phil Dunham
- Born: William Hill; 5 September 1874; Glasgow, Scotland
- Died: 6 July 1921 (aged 46); Los Angeles, California, US
- Spouse: Winifred Frances Kirby
- Children: 1

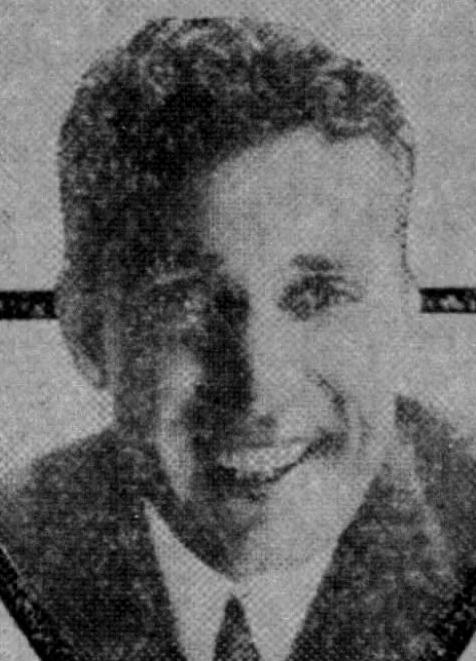
Press Photo

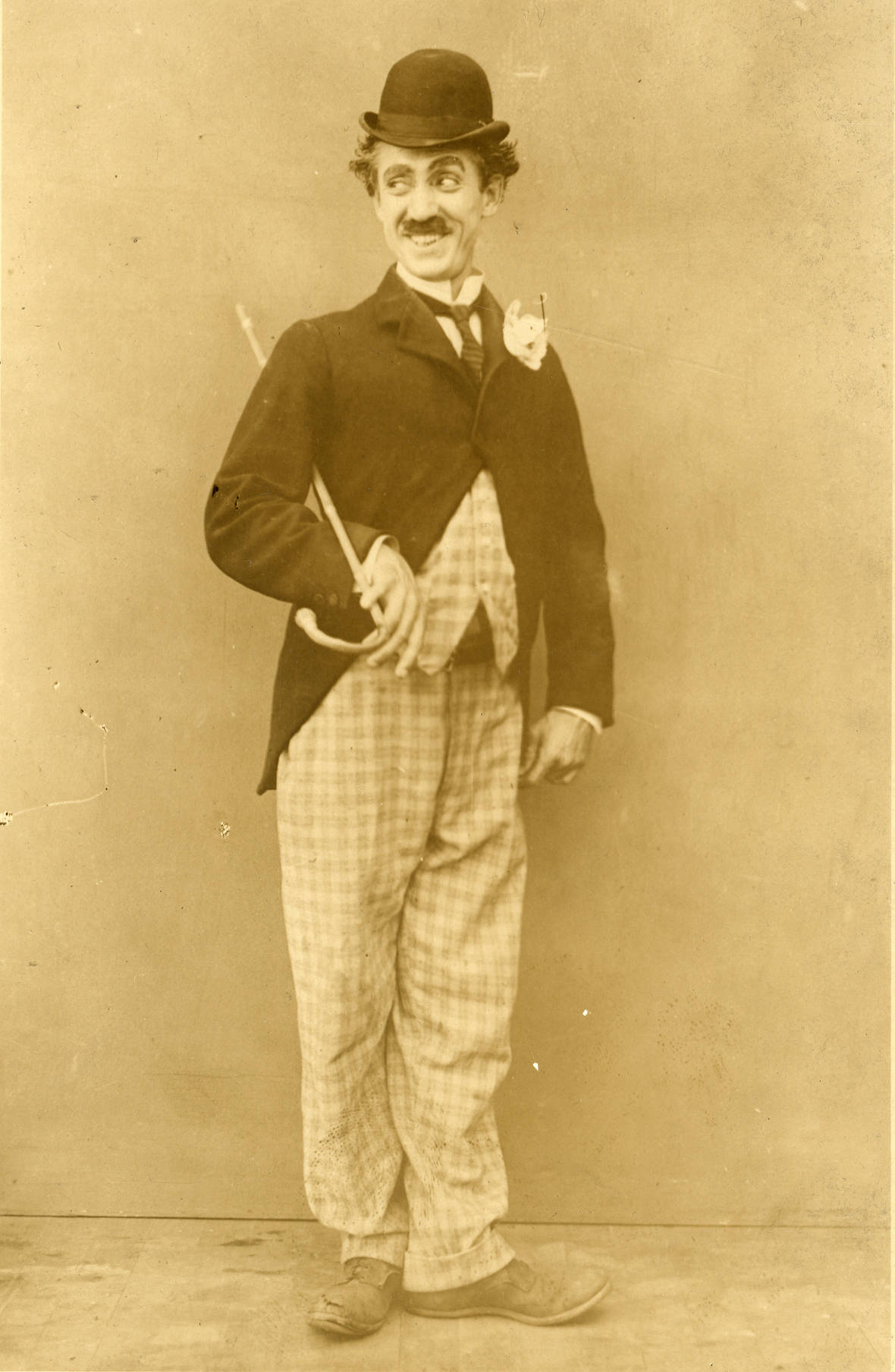
Ritchie as the tramp

Ritchie in Almost a Scandal, released in 1915

William Hill, known professionally as Billie Ritchie (5 September 1874 – 6 July 1921), was a Scottish comedian who first gained transatlantic fame as a performer for British music hall producer Fred Karno — a full decade before Stan Laurel and Charlie Chaplin took a similar career path. Ritchie is best recalled today for the silent comedy shorts he made between 1914 and 1920 for producer-director Henry Lehrman's L-KO Motion Picture Company and Fox Film Sunshine Comedy unit.

== Biography ==
In 1906–1908 and again in 1911–1913, Ritchie toured in Lee Orean Smith's musical Around the Clock in which he starred as the drunk Billie Smith. Variations on Ritchie's "tramp" and "drunk" personae – which Ritchie claimed he had developed before and during his Karno years – were introduced to film audiences by Charlie Chaplin in such shorts as the Lehrman-directed Kid Auto Races at Venice (7 February 1914) and Mabel's Strange Predicament (9 February 1914).

Ritchie, who, due to a series of on-set injuries, spent his final years relatively inactive, succumbed to stomach cancer in the summer of 1921. Winifred Frances, the comedian's widow and onetime stage partner, wound up in the employ of Charlie Chaplin as a wardrobe mistress, suggesting there was no animosity between the two performers. Wyn Ritchie, their daughter, was also a performer and, in private life, the wife (for 55 years) of songwriter Ray Evans.

== In popular culture ==
In 1918 Dutch illustrator David Bueno de Mesquita created a comic book about Ritchie named Billie Ritchie en zijn ezel (Billie Ritchie and his donkey). This was the first celebrity comic in Dutch history.
