= The Squall =

1929 film

- Theatrical release poster
- Directed by: Alexander Korda
- Written by: Bradley King; Paul Perez
- Based on: The Squall; 1926 play by Jean Bart
- Produced by: Ray Rockett
- Starring: Myrna Loy; Richard Tucker; Alice Joyce; Loretta Young; Carroll Nye
- Cinematography: John F. Seitz
- Edited by: Edward Schroeder
- Music by: Leo F. Forbstein
- Production company: First National Pictures
- Distributed by: First National Pictures
- Release date: May 9, 1929
- Running time: 102 minutes
- Country: United States
- Language: English

The Squall is a 1929 American sound (All-Talking) pre-Code drama film directed by Alexander Korda and starring Myrna Loy, Richard Tucker, Alice Joyce, and Loretta Young, and based on the 1926 play The Squall by Jean Bart.

== Plot ==
The Squall (1929)

In Hungary, a beautiful, young gypsy girl, Nubi, seeks shelter during a sudden squall. Nubi is given shelter by a well-to-do farmer and his family. The farmer and his family hide the girl when a brutish, older gypsy lover arrives to claim the girl and take her away. The older gypsy leaves, and Nubi is allowed to stay on with the family as a servant. Nubi does little useful work as a servant in the house, and instead proceeds to use her feminine charms to entice and bewitch various male members of the household, leading to many scenes of discord, anger, and jealousy. The spell that Nubi has put on the house is only lifted at the end of the movie when the older gypsy returns, and carries Nubi away—with the farmer and his family no longer willing to offer protection to the troublesome gypsy girl.

== Cast ==
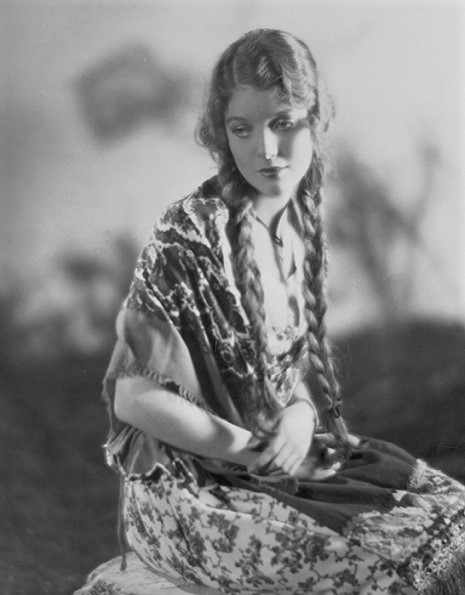
Loretta Young in The Squall

- Richard Tucker as Josef Lajos
- Alice Joyce as Maria Lajos
- Loretta Young as Irma
- Carroll Nye as Paul Lajos
- ZaSu Pitts as Lena
- Harry Cording as Peter
- George Hackathorne as Niki
- Marcia Harris as Aunt Anna
- Knute Erickson as Uncle Dani
- Myrna Loy as Nubi
- Nicholas Soussanin as El Moro

== Music ==
The theme song was entitled "Gypsy Charmer" and was written by Harry Akst and Grant Clarke. It is sung by Myrna Loy in the film. The song is played frequently as background music by the Vitaphone orchestra throughout the film. The score also quotes Franz Liszt's Hungarian Rhapsody No. 2 and Johannes Brahms' Hungarian Dance No. 5.

== Production ==
The film was Korda's first talkie, although his two previous films Night Watch and Love and the Devil had featured sound effects and music as part of the gradual transition from silent to sound film. The film was shot at night at the Burbank studios, as the only sound stage there was used by Warner Brothers during the day.

== Censorship ==
When The Squall was released in the United States, many states and cities in the United States had censor boards that could require cuts or other eliminations before the film could be shown. The Chicago Board of Censors required many deletions, including the lines of dialogue "and has discovered a delicate Eastern way of making virtuous women amuse him", "of course I should have known it isn't love that bothers him, it's sex", "a man needs something more sometimes", and the deletion of a scene of a struggle where a man tries to kiss the shoulder of a woman.

== Preservation ==
The film survives intact with its Vitaphone soundtrack and exists in the Library of Congress and 16mm print survive. The film has been released to DVDR on the Warner Archive Collection label.

== See also ==
- List of early sound feature films (1926–1929)
