= The Man Who Reclaimed His Head =

1934 film by Edward Ludwig

- Theatrical release poster
- Directed by: Edward Ludwig
- Screenplay by: Jean Bart; Samuel Ornitz
- Based on: The Man Who Reclaimed His Head; 1934 play by Jean Bart
- Produced by: Carl Laemmle, Jr.
- Starring: Claude Rains; Joan Bennett; Lionel Atwill; Juanita Quigley; Henry O'Neill; Henry Armetta
- Cinematography: Merritt B. Gerstad
- Edited by: Murray Seldeen
- Music by: Heinz Roemheld
- Production company: Universal Pictures
- Distributed by: Universal Pictures
- Release date: December 24, 1934
- Running time: 80 minutes
- Country: United States
- Language: English

The Man Who Reclaimed His Head is a 1934 American drama film directed by Edward Ludwig and written by Jean Bart and Samuel Ornitz based on Bart's 1934 play of the same name. The film stars Claude Rains, Joan Bennett, Lionel Atwill, Juanita Quigley, Henry O'Neill and Henry Armetta. The film was released on December 24, 1934, by Universal Pictures.

== Plot ==
Paul Verin walks through the streets of 1915 Paris carrying his small daughter Linette on one arm and a black satchel on the other. Arriving at the home of Paul's boyhood friend, attorney Fernand De Marnay, Paul relates the events that led him there.

Five years earlier, Paul and his wife Adele lived in Clichy, relying on Paul's income from his political writings. Although Adele loves Paul, she is unhappy living in Clichy and desires to move to Paris. To afford the move, Paul agrees to write political articles for aspiring politician Henri Dumont, allowing Dumont to take credit as the author. Dumont's anti-war editorials gain him popularity, and Paul and Adele can live comfortably in Paris. However, Dumont's rising popularity attracts wealthy arms dealers who want the editorials to support a pro-war stance. As a pacifist, Paul refuses to write such articles for Dumont.

When war breaks out, Dumont uses his influence to have Paul sent to the front. Paul becomes a corporal and sees action at Verdun. During a leave, Paul finds his leave has been canceled at the railroad station. He hears a rumor that Dumont is not only spending time with Adele but is also responsible for his leave being canceled. Enraged, Paul boards the train to Paris and arrives home to find Dumont attempting to force himself on Adele. In a fit of rage, Paul kills Dumont with his bayonet.

Paul reveals the contents of his satchel to de Mornay. While not graphically shown on screen, the implication of the scene is that the satchel contains the severed head of Dumont. Paul had 'lost his ‘head’ to Dumont and now he has it back.

Adele arrives with the police. De Mornay will be able to get an acquittal for Paul.

== Cast ==
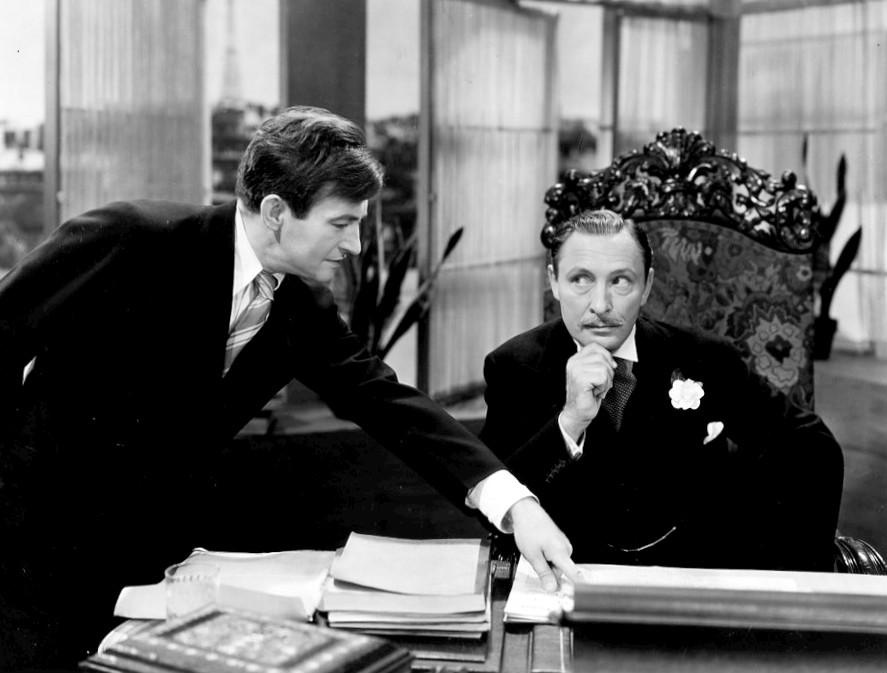
Claude Rains and Lionel Atwill in The Man Who Reclaimed His Head

- Claude Rains as Paul Verin
- Joan Bennett as Adele Verin
- Lionel Atwill as Henri Dumont
- Juanita Quigley as Linette Verin
- Henry O'Neill as Fernand de Marnay
- Henry Armetta as Laurent
- Wallace Ford as 'Curly'
- Lawrence Grant as Marchant
- William B. Davidson as Charles
- Harry Cording as French Mechanic (uncredited)
- Maurice Murphy as Leon - a Soldier (uncredited)
- Edward Van Sloan as Board Director (uncredited)

== Production ==
The film was based on a 1932 stage play which also starred Rains. Jean Arthur played Verin's wife. In the play, the character of Paul Verin was physically malformed and suffered from various ailments. In the film, he did not. Though it isn't known why the change was made, it was likely Rains' choice.

Neither the play or the film were successful. The play closed after only 23 performances and the film did not sell many tickets.
