= Sylvia Sidney =

American actress (1910–1999)

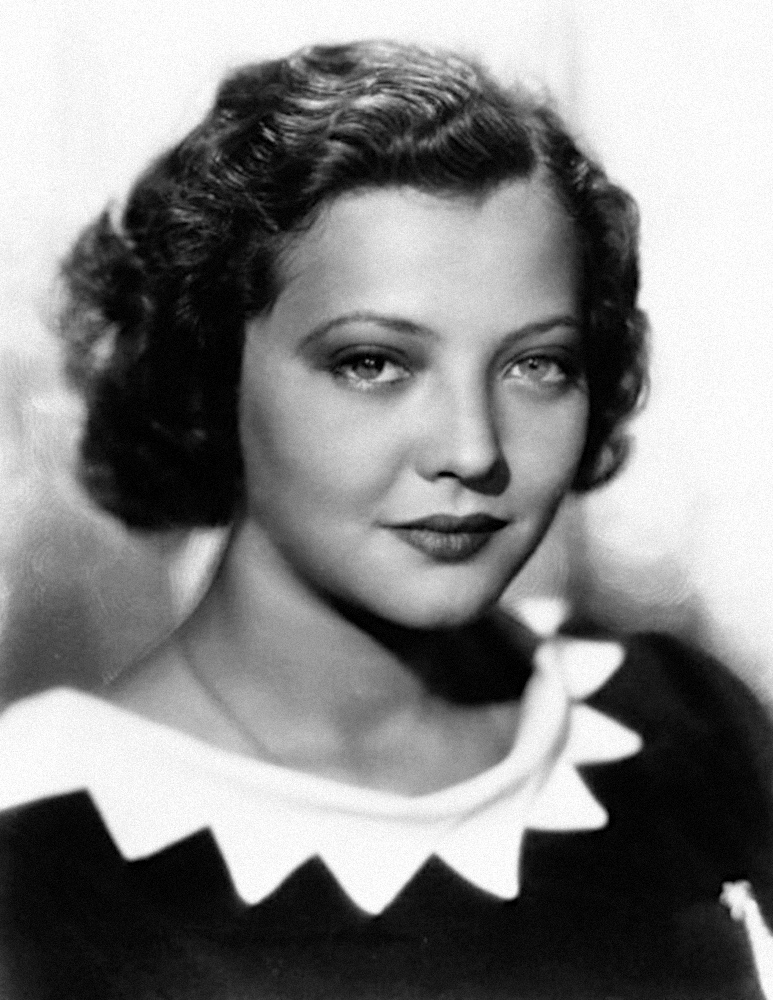
- Sidney c. 1940s
- Born: Sophia Kosow; August 8, 1910; New York City, U.S.
- Died: July 1, 1999 (aged 88); New York City, U.S.
- Occupation: Actress
- Years active: 1925–1998
- Spouses: Bennett Cerf (m. 1935; div. 1936) Luther Adler (m. 1938; div. 1946) Carleton Alsop (m. 1947; div. 1951)
- Children: 1

Signature
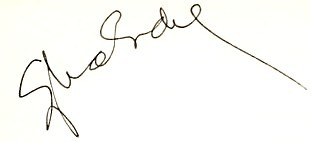

Sylvia Sidney (born Sophia Kosow; August 8, 1910 – July 1, 1999) was an American stage, screen, and film actress whose career spanned over 70 years. She rose to prominence in dozens of leading roles in the 1930s. She was nominated for the Academy Award for Best Supporting Actress for her performance in Summer Wishes, Winter Dreams in 1973. She later gained attention for her role as Juno, a case worker in the afterlife, in Tim Burton's 1988 film Beetlejuice, for which she won a Saturn Award for Best Supporting Actress.

== Early life ==
Sidney was born Sophia Kosow in the Bronx, New York, the daughter of Rebecca (née Saperstein) Yiddish: רבֿקה (סאַפּערשטיין) קאָסאָוו, a Romanian Jew, and Victor Kosow Yiddish: וויקטאָר קאָסאָוו; Russian: Виктор Косов, a Russian-Jewish immigrant who worked as a clothing salesman. Her parents divorced by 1915, and she was adopted by her stepfather Sigmund Sidney, a dentist. Her mother became a dressmaker and renamed herself Beatrice Sidney. Now using the surname Sidney, Sylvia became an actress at the age of 15 as a way of overcoming shyness. As a student of the Theater Guild's School for Acting, she was praised by theater critics for her performances. In 1926, she made her first film appearance as an extra in D.W. Griffith's The Sorrows of Satan.

== Career ==
Sidney made her Broadway debut at age 16 playing blonde ingenue Anita in Jean Bart's The Squall. The production opened on November 11, 1926, at the 48th Street Theatre; Sidney joined the cast in December 1926, taking over for Dorothy Stickney. Sidney left the production in February 1927 to star in Samuel Shipman and John B. Hymer's Crime, where she was touted (but not necessarily verified) in the press as the "youngest leading lady on Broadway." For the summer of 1928 Sidney was part of the stock cast at Elitch Theatre where they threw her a party for her 18th birthday. (Forty-eight years later, in 1976, she would return to the Elitch Theatre for a production of Sabrina Fair.)

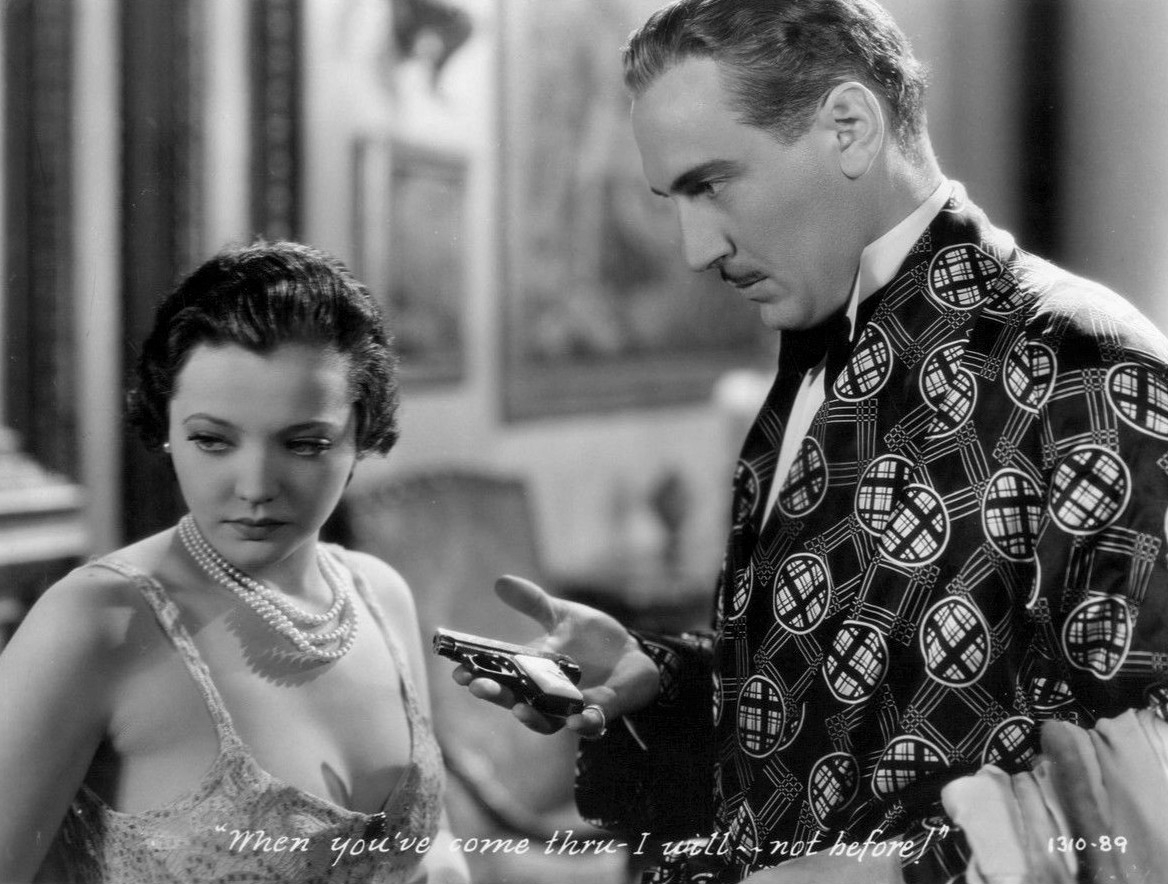
Sidney with Paul Lukas in City Streets (1931), her breakout role

During the Depression, Sidney appeared in a string of films, often playing working-class heroines, or the girlfriend or sister of a gangster. Her role as a wrongly convicted woman in City Streets launched her to stardom in 1931. Other films from this period were An American Tragedy and Street Scene (both 1931), Alfred Hitchcock's Sabotage and Fritz Lang's Fury (both 1936), You Only Live Once and Dead End (both 1937), and The Trail of the Lonesome Pine, an early three-strip Technicolor film. During this period, she developed a reputation for being difficult to work with. At the time of making Sabotage with Alfred Hitchcock, Sidney was one of the highest-paid actresses in the industry, earning $10,000 per week—earning a total of $80,000 for Sabotage.

Sidney's career diminished somewhat during the 1940s. In 1949, exhibitors voted her "box-office poison". In 1952, she played the role of Fantine in Les Misérables, and although the film itself did not meet the studio's expectations, Sidney received critical praise for her performance.

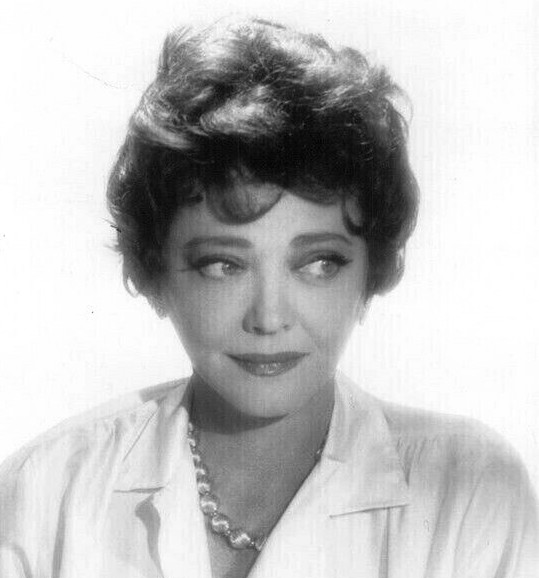
Sidney in 1961

Sidney appeared three times on Playhouse 90. On May 16, 1957, she appeared as Lulu Morgan, mother of singer Helen Morgan in "The Helen Morgan Story". Four months later, Sidney rejoined her former co-star Bergen on the premiere of the short-lived The Polly Bergen Show. She also worked in television during the 1960s on such programs as Route 66, The Defenders, and My Three Sons.

In 1973, Sidney received an Academy Award nomination for her supporting role in Summer Wishes, Winter Dreams. As an elderly woman, Sidney continued to play supporting screen roles, and was identifiable by her husky voice, the result of cigarette smoking. She was the formidable Miss Coral in the film version of I Never Promised You a Rose Garden and later was cast as Aidan Quinn's grandmother in the television production of An Early Frost where she spoke the memorable line "AIDS is a disease, not a disgrace!" and for which she won a Golden Globe Award. She played Aunt Marion in Damien: Omen II and had key roles in Beetlejuice (directed by longtime Sidney fan Tim Burton), for which she won a Saturn Award, and Used People. Her final role was in Mars Attacks!, another film by Burton, in which she played an elderly woman whose beloved records by Slim Whitman help stop an alien invasion from Mars.

On television, she appeared in the pilot episode of WKRP in Cincinnati as the imperious owner of the titular radio station, but was replaced by Carol Bruce in the role after this one appearance. She also appeared in a memorable episode of Thirtysomething as Melissa's tough grandmother, who wanted to leave her granddaughter the family dress business, though Melissa wanted a career as a photographer. Sidney also appeared at the beginning of each episode as the crotchety travel clerk on the short-lived late-1990s revival of Fantasy Island. She also was featured on Starsky & Hutch; The Love Boat; Magnum, P.I.; Diagnosis Murder; and Trapper John, M.D.

Her Broadway career spanned five decades, from her debut performance as a graduate of the Theatre Guild School in June 1926 at age 15, in the three-act fantasy Prunella to the Tennessee Williams play Vieux Carré in 1977. Other stage credits included The Fourposter, Enter Laughing, and Barefoot in the Park. In 1982, Sidney was awarded the George Eastman Award by George Eastman House for distinguished contribution to the art of film.

== Personal life ==
Sidney was married three times, first to publisher Bennett Cerf in 1935; they divorced six months later in 1936, on grounds of incompatibility. She married actor and acting teacher Luther Adler in 1938, with whom she had her only child, son Jacob (born c. 1940), who died of ALS in 1985. Adler and Sidney divorced in 1946, with Sidney alleging Adler was a "bachelor at heart...My husband said marriage was not for him. He said he was too temperamental to be tied down, and just refused to live with me." Both parents were granted custody of Jacob, with each parent having him for six months of the year. On March 5, 1947, she married radio producer Carlton Alsop; roughly four years later, attorney Melvin Belli assisted Sidney in her divorce suit, brought on grounds of extreme cruelty. Waiving any alimony request and seeking only restoration of her maiden name, Sidney was granted the decree and the divorce was finalized on July 24, 1951.

She published two books on the art of needlepoint, and raised and showed pug dogs.

== Death ==
Sidney died on July 1, 1999 from esophageal cancer at Lenox Hill Hospital in Manhattan at age 88.

== Filmography ==
=== Film ===
Year	Title	Role	Notes
1927	Broadway Nights	Herself	Lost film
1929	Thru Different Eyes	Valerie Briand	
1930	Five Minutes from the Station	Carrie Adams	Short film
1931	City Streets	Nan Cooley	
1931	Confessions of a Co-Ed	Patricia Harper	
1931	An American Tragedy	Roberta "Bert" Alden	
1931	Street Scene	Rose Maurrant	
1931	Ladies of the Big House	Kathleen Storm McNeill	
1932	The Miracle Man	Helen Smith	
1932	Merrily We Go to Hell	Joan Prentice	
1932	Make Me a Star	Unknown	Uncredited
1932	Madame Butterfly	Cho-Cho San	
1933	Pick-Up	Mary Richards	
1933	Jennie Gerhardt	Jennie Gerhardt	
1934	Good Dame	Lillie Taylor	
1934	Thirty-Day Princess	Nancy Lane / Princess Catterina	
1934	Behold My Wife	Tonita Storm Cloud	
1935	Accent on Youth	Linda Brown	
1935	Mary Burns, Fugitive	Mary Burns	
1936	The Trail of the Lonesome Pine	June Tolliver	
1936	Fury	Katherine Grant	
1936	Sabotage	Mrs. Verloc	
1937	You Only Live Once	Joan Graham	
1937	Dead End	Drina Gordon	
1938	You and Me	Helen Dennis	
1939	...One Third of a Nation...	Mary Rogers	
1941	The Wagons Roll at Night	Flo Lorraine	
1945	Blood on the Sun	Iris Hilliard	
1946	The Searching Wind	Cassie Bowwman	
1946	Mr. Ace	Margaret Wyndham Chase	
1947	Love from a Stranger	Cecily Harrington	
1952	Les Misérables	Fantine	
1955	Violent Saturday	Elsie Braden	
1956	Behind the High Wall	Hilda Carmichael	
1971	Do Not Fold, Spindle or Mutilate	Elizabeth Gibson	TV movie
1973	Summer Wishes, Winter Dreams	Mrs. Pritchett	Kansas City Film Critics Circle Award for Best Supporting Actress; National Board of Review Award for Best Supporting Actress; Nominated—Academy Award for Best Supporting Actress; Nominated—BAFTA Award for Best Actress in a Supporting Role; Nominated—Golden Globe Award for Best Supporting Actress – Motion Picture
1975	The Secret Night Caller	Kitty	TV movie
1975	Winner Take All	Anne Barclay	TV movie
1976	God Told Me To	Elizabeth Mullin	
1976	Raid on Entebbe	Dora Bloch	TV movie
1976	Death at Love House	Clara Josephs	TV movie
1976	I Never Promised You a Rose Garden	Miss Coral	
1976	Snowbeast	Mrs. Carrie Rill	TV movie
1978	Damien - Omen II	Aunt Marion	
1978	Siege	Lillian Gordon	TV movie
1980	The Gossip Columnist	Alma Lewellyn	TV movie
1980	F.D.R.: The Last Year	Cousin Polly	TV movie
1980	The Shadow Box	Felicity	TV movie
1981	A Small Killing	Sadie Ross	TV movie
1982	Hammett	Donaldina Cameron	
1983	Copkiller	Margaret Smith	
1983	The Brass Ring	Grandmother	TV movie
1985	Finnegan Begin Again	Margaret Finnegan	TV movie
1985	An Early Frost	Beatrice McKenna	TV movie Golden Globe Award for Best Supporting Actress – Series, Miniseries or Television Film; Nominated—Primetime Emmy Award for Outstanding Supporting Actress in a Miniseries or a Movie
1987	Pals	Ferb Stobbs	TV movie
1987	The Witching of Ben Wagner	Grammy	TV movie
1988	Beetlejuice	Juno	Saturn Award for Best Supporting Actress
1990	Andre's Mother	Mrs. Downs – Andre's Grandmother	TV movie
1992	Used People	Becky	
1996	Mars Attacks!	Grandma Florence Norris	Final film role

=== Television ===
Year	Title	Role	Notes
1952	Cameo Theatre	Unknown	Episode: "The Gathering Twilight"
1952	Schlitz Playhouse of Stars	Unknown	Episode: "Experiment"
1952	Tales of Tomorrow	Natalie	Episode: "Time to Go"
1952	Lux Video Theatre	Joyce	Episode: "Night Be Quiet"
1952	Lux Video Theatre	Laura Barrie	Episode: "Pattern for Glory"
1953–1955	The Ford Television Theatre	Unknown	2 episodes
1954	The Philco Television Playhouse	Unknown	Episode: "Catch My Boy on Sunday"
1955	Star Stage	"famous stage actress"	title unknown
1955–1956	Celebrity Playhouse	Meg Fraser	2 episodes
1955-1956	The 20th Century Fox Hour	Mrs. Cosick	Episode: "Man on the Ledge"
1955–1957	Climax!	Louella Wheedron	2 episodes
1957	Kraft Television Theatre	Unknown	Episode: "Circle of Fear"
1960	The DuPont Show with June Allyson	Beulah	Episode: "Escape"
1961	Naked City	Florence	Episode: "A Hole in the City"
1961	Route 66	Hannah Ellis	Episode: "Like a Motherless Child"
1962	The Defenders	Adela Collins	2 episodes Nominated—Primetime Emmy Award for Outstanding Guest Actress in a Drama Series
1963	The Eleventh Hour	Mrs. Arnold	Episode: "Five Moments Out of Time"
1964	Route 66	Lonnie Taylor	Episode: "Child of a Night"
1964	The Nurses	Mrs. Sands	Episode: "To All My Friends on Shore"
1969	My Three Sons	Miss Houk	Episode: "Teacher's Pet"
1975–1976	Ryan's Hope	Sister Mary Joel	3 episodes
1976	Starsky & Hutch	Olga Grossman	Episode: "Gillian"
1977	Westside Medical	Unknown	Episode: "Tears for Two Dollar Wine"
1977	Eight Is Enough	Evelin (Abby's Aunt)	2 episodes
1978	WKRP in Cincinnati	Mother Carlson	Episode: "Pilot – Part 1"
1978	Kaz	Molly	Episode: "A Fine Romance"
1979	Supertrain	Agatha	Episode: "Superstar"
1979	California Fever	Mother	Episode: "Movin' Out"
1981	The Love Boat	Natalie	Episode: "I Love You Too, Smith"
1982	American Playhouse	Mrs. Flanner	Episode: "Come Along with Me"
1983	Magnum, P.I.	Elizabeth Barrett	Episode: "Birdman of Budapest"
1984	Domestic Life	Mrs. Moscewicz	Episode: "Small Cranes Court"
1984	Whiz Kids	Dolly	Episode: "The Lollipop Gang Strikes Back"
1984	Trapper John, M.D.	Mildred Prosser	Episode: "Aunt Mildred Is Watching"
1986	Morningstar/Eveningstar	Binnie Taylor	7 episodes
1988	Dear John	Mrs. Lumenski	Episode: "Dancing in the Dark"
1989	The Equalizer	Judge	Episode: "Trial by Ordeal"
1989	Thirtysomething	Rose Waldman	Episode: "Be a Good Girl"
1993	Diagnosis: Murder	Alice	Episode: "Miracle Cure"
1998	Fantasy Island	Clia	7 episodes, (final appearance)

== Radio appearances ==
Year	Program	Episode/source
1941	Philip Morris Playhouse	Angels with Dirty Faces
1941	Philip Morris Playhouse	Wuthering Heights

== Awards and nominations ==
Year	Organization	Category	Work	Result	Ref.
1960	Hollywood Walk of Fame	Star - Motion Pictures	—N/a	Honored	
1963	Primetime Emmy Awards	Outstanding Single Performance By An Actress In A Leading Role	The Defenders	Nominated	
1973	National Board of Review	Best Supporting Actress	Summer Wishes, Winter Dreams	Won	
1974	Academy Awards	Best Supporting Actress	Summer Wishes, Winter Dreams	Nominated	
1974	British Academy Film Awards	Best Actress in a Supporting Role	Summer Wishes, Winter Dreams	Nominated	
1974	Golden Globe Awards	Best Supporting Actress – Motion Picture	Summer Wishes, Winter Dreams	Nominated	
1974	Kansas City Film Critics Circle	Best Supporting Actress	Summer Wishes, Winter Dreams	Won	
1982	George Eastman Museum	George Eastman Award	—N/a	Honored	
1986	Golden Globe Awards	Best Supporting Actress – Series, Miniseries or Television Film	An Early Frost	Won	
1986	Primetime Emmy Awards	Outstanding Supporting Actress in a Miniseries	An Early Frost	Nominated	
1988	Saturn Awards	Best Supporting Actress	Beetlejuice	Won	
1990	Film Society of Lincoln Center	Lifetime Achievement Award	—N/a	Honored	

== Sources ==
- Miller, Sally, Sylvia: A Memoir Of Hollywood Star Sylvia Sidney, Synergy Book Service (September 15, 2004), ISBN 0-9758581-0-6/ISBN 978-0975858103
- Sylvia Sidney at IMDb
- Sylvia Sidney at the Internet Broadway Database
- Sylvia Sidney at the TCM Movie Database (archived)
- Sidney accepting her Golden Globe (1986) on YouTube
