= It's a Wonderful World (1939 film) =

1939 film by W. S. Van Dyke

- Theatrical release poster
- Directed by: W. S. Van Dyke
- Screenplay by: Ben Hecht
- Story by: Ben Hecht; Herman J. Mankiewicz
- Produced by: Frank Davis
- Starring: Claudette Colbert; James Stewart; Guy Kibbee; Nat Pendleton; Frances Drake; Edgar Kennedy; Ernest Truex
- Cinematography: Oliver T. Marsh
- Edited by: Harold F. Kress
- Music by: Edward Ward
- Production company: Metro-Goldwyn-Mayer
- Distributed by: Loew's, Inc.
- Release date: May 19, 1939
- Running time: 86 minutes
- Country: United States
- Language: English

It's a Wonderful World is a 1939 American screwball comedy starring Claudette Colbert and James Stewart, and directed by W. S. Van Dyke.

== Plot ==
Private detective Guy Johnson is well paid to watch over Willie Heyward, a wealthy man who likes to drink a bit too much and gets into trouble as a result. However, when Heyward's recent ex-girlfriend, Dolores Gonzalez, makes a public nuisance of herself over their relationship, a drunk Heyward goes to see her, not knowing it is a setup. Dolores is being held at gunpoint by a man, so when Heyward enters her apartment, the mystery man kills Dolores and frames Heyward for the murder. The only clue is half of a dime incorporated into a piece of jewelry that the victim managed to snatch from her assailant. Guy hurries to the scene soon after and hides his client so he can catch the real killer, but both of them are nabbed by the police, tried, convicted and sentenced: Guy to prison for a year, Heyward to be executed.

It is revealed to the audience that Heyward's new wife, Vivian, and her lover, Al Mallon, are behind the whole thing. She stands to inherit Heyward's millions. In addition to her lover, the unfaithful woman discovers that her husband Ned Brown, an actor who she thought was dead, is still alive. Brown unexpectedly arrives from Australia and begins blackmailing her.

On the way to prison, Guy comes across a clue: a newspaper personal ad from "Half a Dime" asking to be contacted in a theater in at a certain location. Guy jumps from the moving train into a river, taking along the bumbling policeman handcuffed to him, Sergeant Fred Koretz.

His struggle with Koretz is witnessed by noted poet, Edwina Corday, who happens to be strolling near the river. After knocking Koretz out and freeing himself from the handcuffs, he has no choice but to kidnap Edwina to prevent her from sounding the alarm. At first, she believes him to be a dangerous criminal, but she soon discovers he is telling the truth about his mission. She then insists on sticking with him, much to his annoyance, as he conveys his low opinion regarding the intelligence of women.

The trail eventually leads to a small theater group run by Madame Chambers in Saugerties, New York. Guy gets himself hired as an actor to figure out who knows about the half dime. Guy brings in his associate, "Cap" Streeter, to help with the investigation, only to have Edwina mistake him for a policeman and knock him out. Meanwhile, Vivian and Mallon decide it is better to silence her husband rather than submit to his demands. However, Mallon kills the wrong actor, a last-minute replacement, during a performance of What Price Glory? Guy is arrested by the police, but Edwina tricks them into going to where Brown lives to look for a diary that supposedly implicates Guy in the first murder. When they drive to the address she gives, they catch Vivian and Mallon in the process of escaping with a bound and gagged Brown. As the police take away the true culprits, Guy recites a comical poem to Edwina professing his love for her and they embrace.

== Cast ==
- Claudette Colbert as Edwina Corday
- James Stewart as Guy Johnson
- Guy Kibbee as Fred 'Cap' Streeter
- Nat Pendleton as Sergeant Fred Koretz
- Frances Drake as Vivian Tarbel
- Edgar Kennedy as Lieutenant Miller
- Ernest Truex as Willie Heyward
- Richard Carle as Major I. E. Willoughby, the head of Guy's detective agency
- Cecilia Callejo as Dolores Gonzales
- Sidney Blackmer as Al Mallon
- Andy Clyde as 'Gimpy' Wilson
- Cliff Clark as Captain Haggerty, the frustrated boss of bumblers Koretz and Miller
- Cecil Cunningham as Madame J. L. Chambers
- Leonard Kibrick as Herman Plotka
- Hans Conried as Mr. Delmonico, Stage Manager
- Conrad Veidt as George Richard
- Brandon Hurst as Paul Henry
- Grady Sutton as Lupton Peabody
- George Meeker as Ned Brown
