= Suzanne Caubet =

French actress, singer and writer (1898–1980)

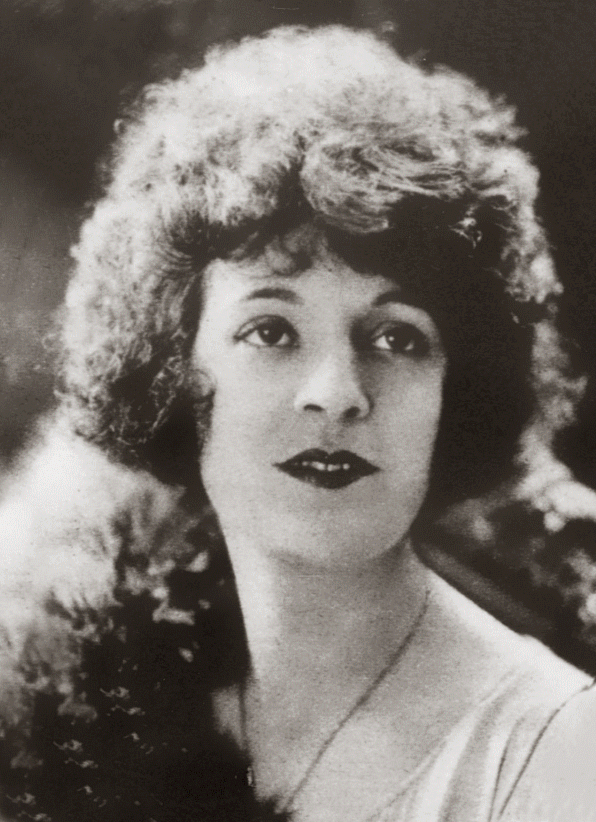
- Suzanne Caubet, from a 1927 midweek pictorial publication
- Born: September 27, 1898; Lévignac
- Died: 1980 (aged 81–82); Englewood, New Jersey
- Other names: Suzanne Caubaye, Suzanne Caubet Wilbur (after marriage), S. C. Wilbur, Jeanne Caubannes (pen name)
- Occupations: actress, singer, writer
- Years active: 1917–1955
- Known for: stage career; protégée of Sarah Bernhardt

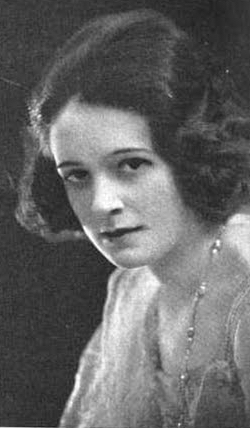
Suzanne Caubet, from a 1919 publication.

Suzanne Caubet (September 27, 1898 – June 1980), also known as Suzanne Caubaye, was a French actress, singer, and writer.

== Early life ==
Suzanne Caubet was born in Lévignac to French parents. She was raised in Paris, and knew her godmother Sarah Bernhardt through her father Prospere Caubet and uncle, Georges Deneubourg, both actors. She was a child actor and traveled with Bernhardt's company to the United States, where Caubet stayed after 1919.

== Career ==
Caubet was based in New York as an actress. "Miss Caudet has the distinct advantage of being a striking brunette," the New York Times observed of her appearance in 1919. She appeared on Broadway in Du Theatre au Champ D'Honneur (1917), Easy Terms (1925), The Squall (1926–1927), Ringside (1928), Seven (1929–1930), The Plutocrat (1930), Dancing Partner (1930), The Great Barrington (1931), Angeline Moves In (1932), Singapore (1932), The Monster (1933), Another Love (1934), Broadway Interlude (1934), Symphony (1935), American Holiday (1936), Claudia (1942), It's a Gift (1945), and Mid-Summer (1953).

In 1955 she appeared in "The File Clerk", an episode of the television anthology series I Spy.

== Writing ==
Caubet wrote a play with Anne Partridge, Our Sarah (1945), about Sarah Bernhardt, and comedies Riri (1929, with Daniel Auschitzky), and Just You, Madame (1932). She also adapted Daniel Auschitzky's Hide and Seek (1929). Under the pseudonym "Jeanne Caubannes" she wrote Ranah (1928) with Wood Soanes.

== Other activities ==
In 1938 Caubet was teaching in the drama department at Marymount College and directing a Christmas pageant at the school. In 1942, she served as a French language specialist for the wartime Postal Censorship Office, while also appearing in a Broadway show.

== Personal life ==
Suzanne Caubet married actor and playwright Crane Wilbur in 1922. They divorced in 1928. She died in 1980, aged 81 years, at the Actors' Fund Home in Englewood, New Jersey. Her papers are archived in the New York Public Library's Billy Rose Theatre Division.
