= The Squall (play) =

1926 play by Jean Bart

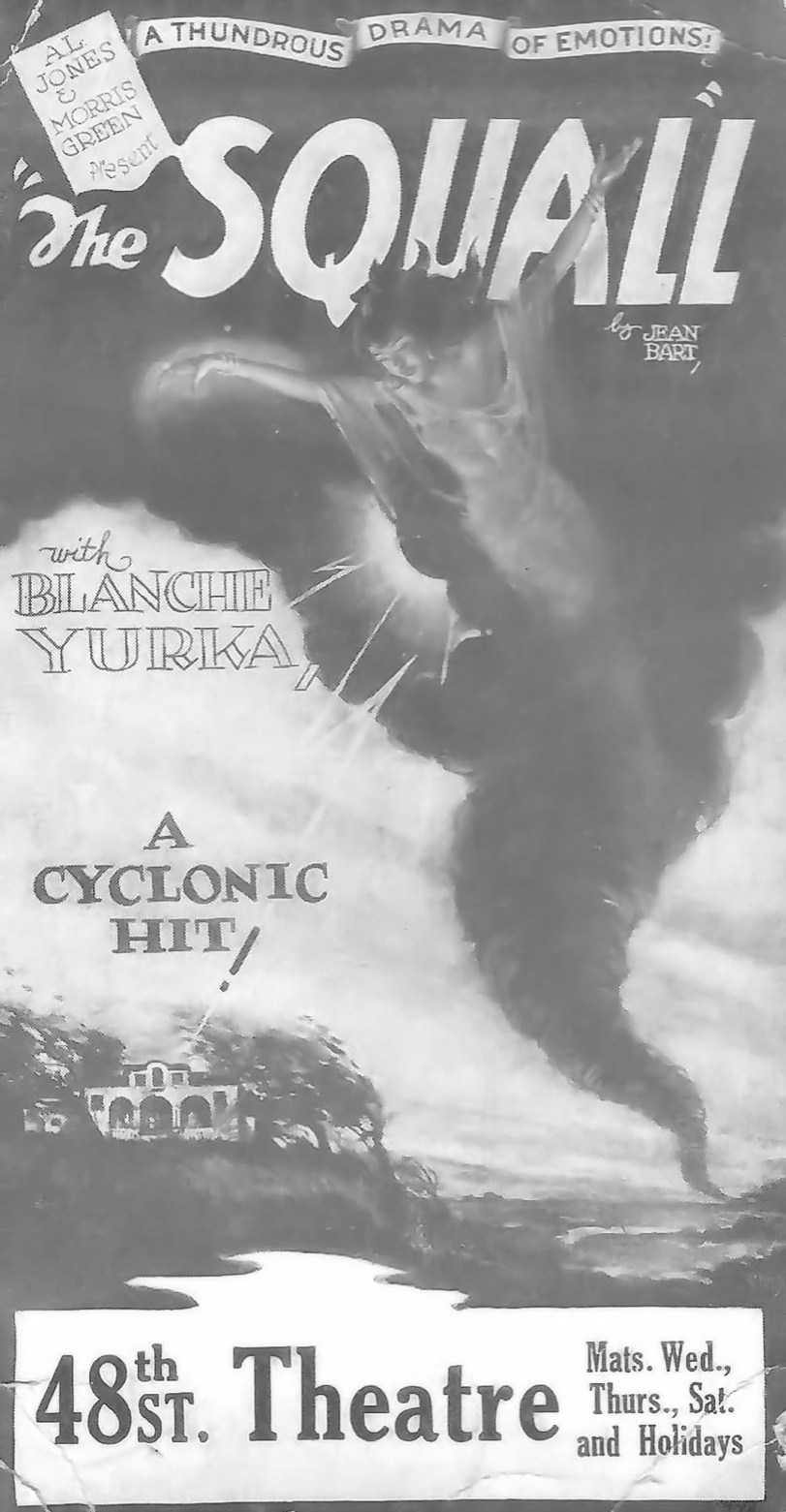
- Original language: English
- Written by: Jean Bart
- Subject: Temptress wreaks havoc
- Genre: Melodrama
- Setting: The Mendez household near Granada

Premiere
- Date: November 11, 1926
- Place: 48th Street Theatre
- Directed by: Howard Lindsay and Lionel Atwill

The Squall is a 1926 play by Jean Bart. It has three acts, one setting, and twelve characters. The story concerns the impact a conniving young girl seeking refuge has on a previously content family. The title refers both to a natural storm and the girl's effect. This was the first play by Jean Bart to be produced.

The play was first produced by a summer stock company in Madison, Maine during 1926, with staging by Howard Lindsay, and starring Blanche Yurka. The Squall was then produced for Broadway by A. L. Jones and Morris Green, with new staging by Lionel Atwill, settings by William Castle, special effects by Langdon McCormick, and again starring Blanche Yurka. After a one-night tryout at Mamaroneck, New York, it had its Broadway premiere in November 1926, running for 443 performances, and ending just over a year later.

It was adapted for an early talkie film of the same name in 1929.

== Characters ==
Characters are listed in order of appearance within their scope.

Lead

- Juan Mendez is the son of Jose and Delores, heir to the Mendez wealth.
- Delores Mendez is the middle-aged wife of Jose and mother of Juan. (Note: The character name was a nod to the playwright's sister-in-law, Delores Sarlabous.)
- José Mendez is the middle-aged head of the distinguished Mendez family.
- Nubi is a pretty Spanish Gypsy who speaks in an odd pidgin.

Supporting

- Manuella is the maid in the Mendez household. (Note: The spelling of this name is often given only one "l".)
- Pedro is a hired hand for the Mendez farm, engaged to Manuella.

Featured

- Dona Paca is a tiny old woman who gossips about the new Mendez guest.
- Finito is rotund and short, a foxy young man whose wiles are hid by a lisp.
- Anita is a young blonde girl, who dares to challenge Nubi.
- Padre Molina is the village priest.
- Don Diego is a local notable, who has a wooden left leg.
- El Moro is head of the Spanish Gypsy clan from which Nubi has fled.

== Synopsis ==
This synopsis was compiled from contemporaneous newspaper reviews.

The Mendez family, their servants and retainers, are a content group living on their land in the village of Queano, near Granada. During a squall, a fearful Gypsy girl seeks refuge with the family. Her name is Nubi, and she is being pursued by a large fierce-looking Gypsy called El Moro. He is chieftain of her family group and wants to take her back to them, but the Mendez family hides her and claims she went elsewhere. Nubi persuades Delores Mendez to let her stay. She is striking looking, with curly black hair and large gold hoop earrings, which seem to bedazzle Juan Mendez, and Pedro the hired hand. As a servant, she soon proves worthless. She stands about, hands on hips, bewitching the men and urging them on with promises. She drives a wedge between Pedro and Manuella, while bewitching Juan, and even tempting José. She is causing gossip among the village folk with her wanton behavior. Delores is at a loss what to do. If she throws Nubi out, the men might follow her. Delores prays to the Virgin Mary for help, but is appalled to see Juan come out of Nubi's bedroom in the morning. He has given Nubi a valuable necklace for her favors. But El Moro returns, having been secretly summoned by Delores, carrying a large whip. This time the family yields up Nubi when he tells them she deserted her husband and baby. He drags her off by her hair, and the Mendez family tries to regain their previous contentment.

== Original production ==
=== Background ===
Jean Bart, the nom de plume of Marie Sarlabous, was a French-born writer of film scenarios and operetta librettos. This was her first play to be produced. Her husband, Dr. Emile Sarlabous, (Note: His first name is often given in various forms: Emil, Emile, and Emilio.) was a staff physician for the Metropolitan Opera, a specialist in ear, nose and throat issues. She was fluent in English, Spanish, and Italian besides her native French. Blanche Yurka, who took singing instruction at the Met, came to know her and persuaded A. L. Jones and Morris Green to give her play The Squall a tryout. Jones and Green, who as The Bohemians (Inc.) had produced The Greenwich Village Follies since 1919, were able to get Howard Lindsay to add The Squall to the summer schedule for the Lakewood Players during August 1926. Lindsay also staged the production, with assistance from the author.

=== Cast ===
Principal cast only during the Mamaroneck tryout and the Broadway run.
Role	Actor	Dates	Notes and sources
Juan Mendez	Hoarce Barham	Nov 03, 1926 - Nov 19, 1927	
Delores Mendez	Blanche Yurka	Nov 03, 1926 - Nov 19, 1927	
José Mendez	Lee Baker	Nov 03, 1926 - Nov 19, 1927	
Nubi	Suzanne Caubet	Nov 03, 1926 - May 14, 1927	After seven months playing the role, Caubet decided to take a vacation.
Nubi	Barbara Bulgakov	May 16, 1927 - Nov 19, 1927	Russian-born actress, a graduate of the Moscow Art Theatre, who came to the US with Stanislavski.
Manuella	Mary Fowler	Nov 03, 1926 - Dec 06, 1926	
Manuella	Nedda Harrigan	Dec 07, 1926 - Nov 19, 1927	Harrigan had created this role during the summer tryout in Maine.
Pedro	Hugh Kidder	Nov 03, 1926 - Nov 19, 1927	
Dona Paca	Ida Mulle	Nov 03, 1926 - Nov 19, 1927	
Finito	Romney Brent	Nov 03, 1926 - Feb 19, 1927	
Finito	TBD	Feb 21, 1927 - Nov 19, 1927	
Anita	Dorothy Stickney	Nov 03, 1926 - Dec 09, 1926	Stickney was another performer from the original summer tryout in Maine.
Anita	Grace Alyce Durkin	Dec 10, 1926 - Jan 08, 1927	
Anita	Sylvia Sidney	Jan 10, 1927 - Feb 05, 1927	Sidney was a graduate of the Theater Guild's drama school.
Anita	(Multiple actresses)	Feb 07, 1927 - Nov 19, 1927	The producers made a revolving door out of this role, with a new ingenue every month.
Padre Molina	Charles R. Burrows	Nov 03, 1926 - Nov 19, 1927	
Don Diego	Henry O'Neill	Nov 03, 1926 - Nov 19, 1927	
El Moro	Ali Yousuff	Nov 03, 1926 - Nov 19, 1927	Born in Damascus, he was 6-foot-3-inch (191 cm), weighed 225 pounds (102 kg), and had been educated at Heidelberg.

=== Tryouts ===
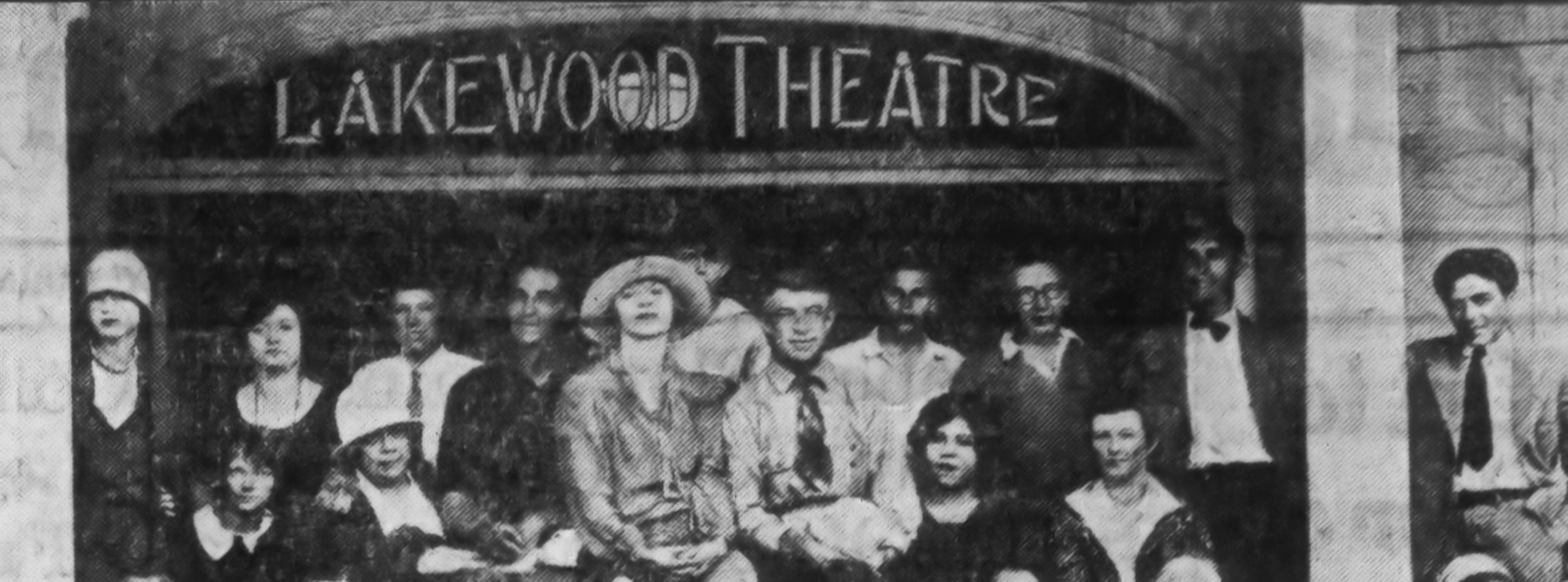

The Squall was first performed at Lakewood Theater in Madison, Maine on August 9, 1926. Supplementing the regular stock company were guest stars Blanche Yurka, Pedro de Cordoba, Hortense Alden, and Murray Alper. The regular company included Arthur Byron, Dorothy Stickney, Nedda Harrigan, Albert Hackett, Walter Connolly, Katheryn Keyes, and Cornelius Van Voorhies. The play was well-received, but the producers were unable to sign all cast members for Broadway.

The producers hired Lionel Atwill to direct the Broadway production of The Squall, and signed new cast members Suzanne Caubet, Harold Barham, Lee Baker, and Mary Fowler. They also decided on a one-night tryout with their new cast at the Mamaroneck Playhouse in Mamaroneck, New York on November 3, 1926. The local reviewer commended the acting and setting, but thought the first act slow to establish what proved to be an interesting story.

=== Broadway premiere and reception ===
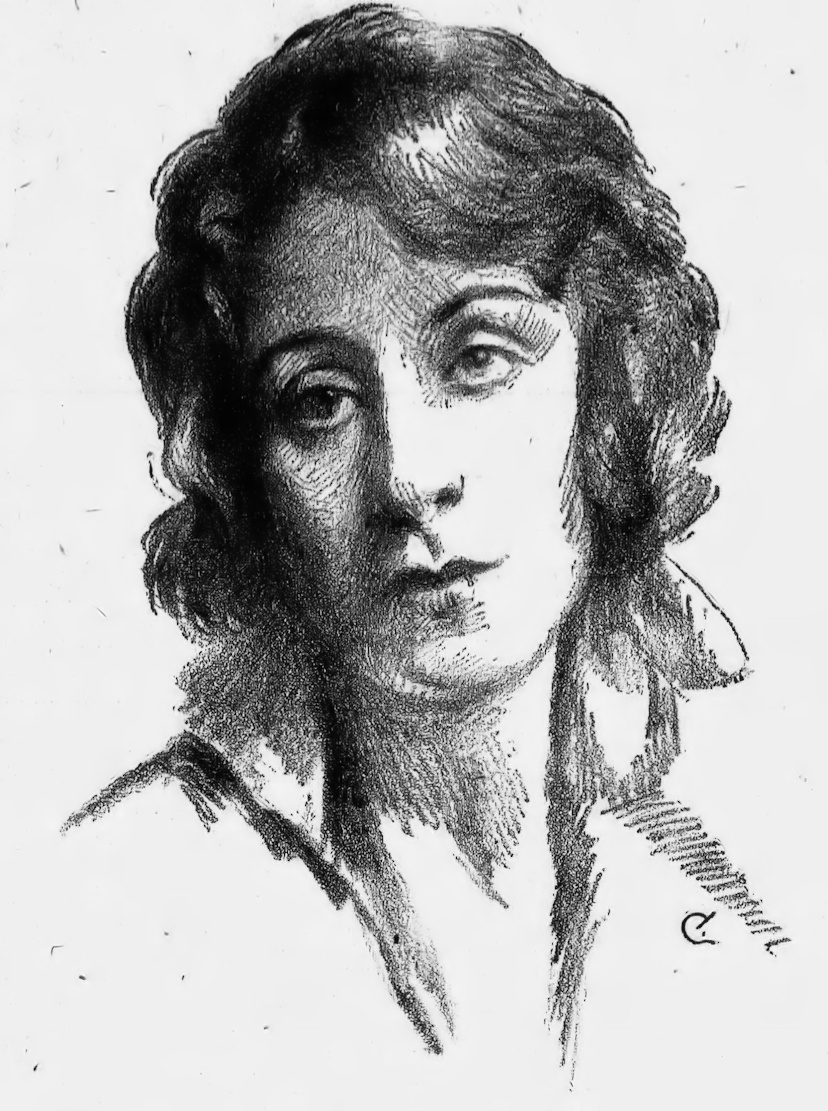
Blanche Yurka

The Squall had its Broadway premiere at the 48th Street Theatre on Armistice Day, November 11, 1926. Ray W. Harper noted the storm effect created by Langdon McCormick, and said "This hectic drama of sex, love, and passion in Spain had many fine moments and then again some tiresome stretches". Arthur Pollock said "The play is nicely calculated trash and ought to prosper". Rowland Field was less cynical, calling the play "absorbing" and praising the performances of Blanche Yurka and Suzanne "Caubert" [sic], while reporting the enthusiastic audience's "prolonged and genuine" applause.

Burns Mantle called The Squall "an actors play", with good principal roles and colorful bit parts. He praised the performances, Langdon McCormick's storm and Lionel Atwill's direction, and concluded by suggesting of the author's first play: "She has no reason to be ashamed of it. Nor any to feel unduly optimistic." Brooks Atkinson called The Squall a "meretricious drama, one of an old, old lineage". He felt the outrageous speech (Note: An actual sample of her dialogue, as quoted by Burns Mantle from the opening night: "Me Nubi. Nubi good girl. Nubi stay with senora". He went on to say that at this point Robert Benchley got up from his seat in the audience and went up the aisle muttering "Me Benchley. Me good boy too. But me no stay see Nubi!" Six months later, as The Squall was performed for the 200th time, the producers sent a large floral wreath to Robert Benchley to mark the occasion.) and actions of Nubi distracted from the fine performance of Blanche Yurka, "who deserves a play commensurate with her ability." He did admire the setting by William Castle, and called the storm effect "elaborate" and "noticeable".

The producers often scheduled extra matinees, and as the run lengthened, began cutting the weekly salaries of performers. When this was done a third time, during June 1927, Blanche Yurka gave notice to the producers. The matter was resolved to her satisfaction, for she continued with the show. The play received renewed national attention during late July 1927, when well-known screenwriter June Mathis died during the performance she was viewing.

=== Broadway closing ===
The Squall closed at the 48th Street Theatre on November 19, 1927, after 443 performances. (Note: This included 441 performances as reported by the Daily News on the morning of November 19, 1927, plus the matinee and evening show from later that day.) The production then started touring, beginning with the Majestic Theatre in Brooklyn, with the original Nubi actress, Suzanne Chaubaye, (Note: She had changed her French surname "Chaubet" to a more phonetic spelling for Anglophone audiences.) returning to that role.

== Adaptations ==
=== Film ===
- The Squall - 1929 film directed by Alexander Korda, who transferred the setting to his native Hungary, starring Myrna Loy, Richard Tucker, Alice Joyce and Loretta Young.

== Bibliography ==
- Jean Bart. The Squall: A Drama in Three Acts. Samuel French, New York, 1932.
