= Meet John Doe =

1941 film by Frank Capra

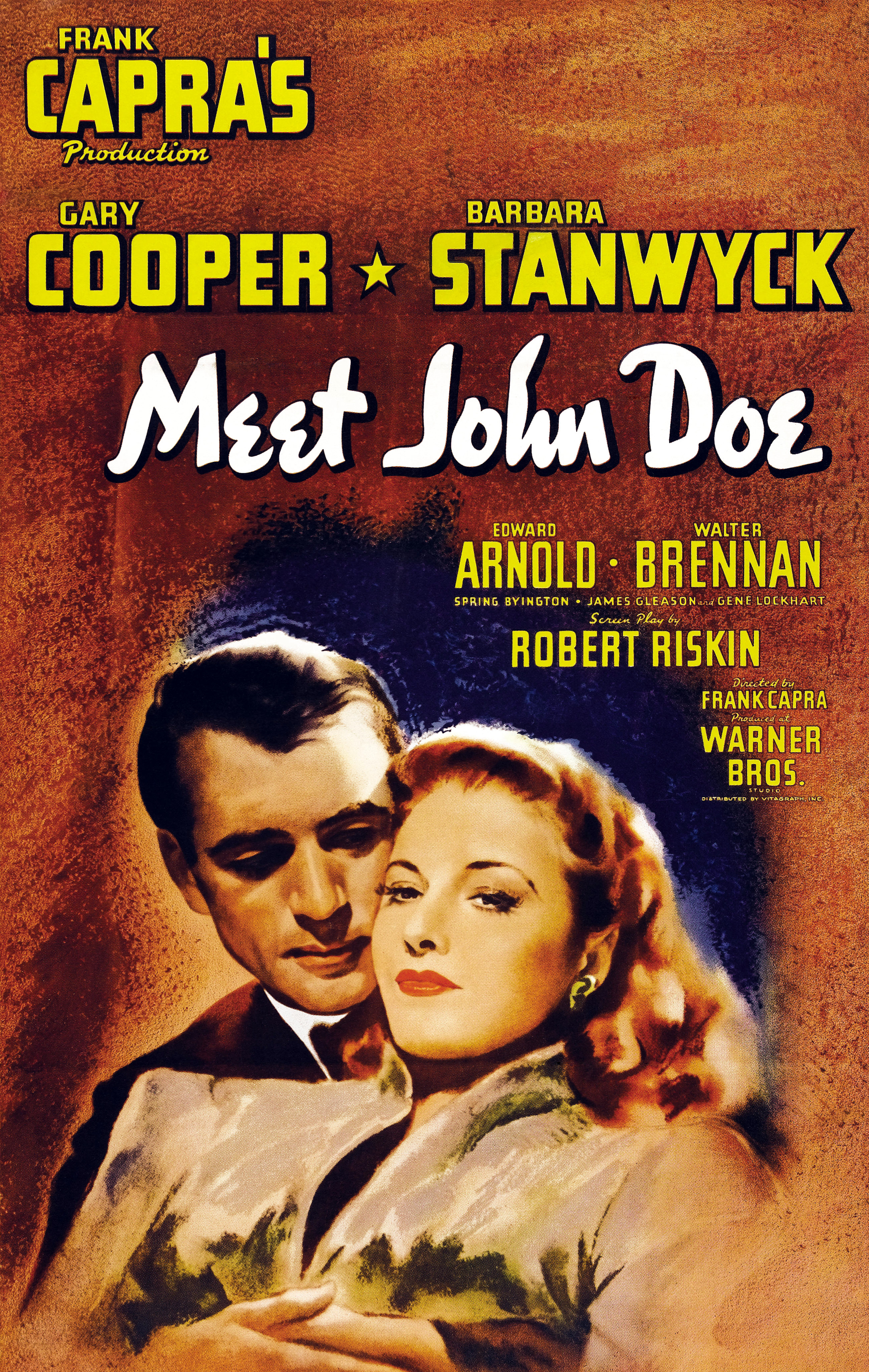
- Theatrical release poster
- Directed by: Frank Capra
- Screenplay by: Robert Riskin
- Story by: Robert Presnell Sr.
- Based on: "A Reputation"; 1922 story in Century Magazine by Richard Connell
- Produced by: Frank Capra
- Starring: Gary Cooper; Barbara Stanwyck; Edward Arnold; Walter Brennan; Spring Byington; James Gleason; Gene Lockhart
- Cinematography: George Barnes
- Edited by: Daniel Mandell
- Music by: Dimitri Tiomkin
- Production company: Frank Capra Productions
- Distributed by: Warner Bros. Pictures
- Release date: May 3, 1941
- Running time: 122 minutes
- Country: United States
- Language: English
- Box office: $1.8 million (initial U.S. release)

Meet John Doe (1941)

Meet John Doe is a 1941 American comedy-drama film directed and produced by Frank Capra, written by Robert Riskin, and starring Gary Cooper, Barbara Stanwyck, Edward Arnold, Walter Brennan, Spring Byington, James Gleason, and Gene Lockhart. The film is about a "grassroots" political campaign created unwittingly by a newspaper columnist with the involvement of a hired homeless man and pursued by the paper's wealthy owner.

The film became a box-office success and was nominated for an Academy Award for Best Story; it was ranked No. 49 in AFI's 100 Years ... 100 Cheers. It was the first of two features Capra made for Warner Bros. Pictures after he left Columbia Pictures, the other being Arsenic and Old Lace (1944).

In 1969, the film entered the public domain in the United States because the claimants did not renew its copyright registration in the 28th year after publication.

== Plot ==
A local newspaper, The Bulletin, is under new management and renamed The New Bulletin, with columnist Ann Mitchell being one of the staffers dismissed to "streamline" the paper, but not before being told to write one final column. Infuriated, Ann prints a letter from a fictional unemployed "John Doe" threatening suicide on Christmas Eve in protest of society's ills. When the letter causes a sensation among readers, and the paper's competition, The Chronicle, suspects a fraud and starts to investigate, editor Henry Connell is persuaded to rehire Ann, who schemes to boost the newspaper's sales by exploiting the fictional John Doe.

From a number of derelicts who show up at the paper claiming to have written the original letter, Ann and Henry hire Long John Willoughby, a former baseball player and tramp in need of money to repair his injured arm, to play the role of John Doe. Ann starts to pen a series of articles in John Doe's name, elaborating on the original letter's ideas of society's disregard for people in need. Willoughby receives $50, a new suit of clothes, and a lavish hotel suite with his tramp friend, the "Colonel", who launches into an extended diatribe against "heelots", people who are trying to sell things, burdening others with ownership, and tying them down with responsibilities that require money to pay for them, until they, too, become heelots.

Proposing to take John Doe nationwide via the radio, Ann is given $100 a week by the Bulletin's publisher, D. B. Norton, to write radio speeches for Willoughby. Meanwhile, Willoughby is offered a $5,000 bribe from The Chronicle to admit the whole thing was a publicity stunt, but ultimately turns it down and delivers the speech Ann has written for him instead. Afterward, feeling conflicted, he runs away, riding the rails with the Colonel until they reach Millville. "John Doe" is recognized at a diner and brought to City Hall, where he is met by soda jerk Bert Hansen, who explains how he was inspired by Willoughby's words to start a "John Doe Club" with his neighbors.

The John Doe philosophy spreads across the country, developing into a broad grassroots movement with the slogan "Be a better neighbor". However, Norton secretly plans to channel support for John Doe into support for his own national political ambitions. When a John Doe rally is scheduled, with John Doe Clubs from across the country in attendance, Norton instructs Mitchell to write a speech for Willoughby in which he announces the foundation of a new political party and endorses Norton as its presidential candidate.

On the night of the rally, Willoughby, who has come to believe in the John Doe philosophy himself, learns of Norton's treachery from a drunken Henry. He denounces Norton and tries to expose the plot at the rally, but his speech is interrupted by hordes of newsboys carrying a special edition of The New Bulletin exposing John Doe as a fake. Norton claims Willoughby had deceived him and the staff of the newspaper, like everyone else, and cuts off the loudspeakers before Willoughby can defend himself.

Despondent at letting his now-angry followers down, Willoughby attempts suicide by jumping from the roof of the City Hall on Christmas Eve, as indicated in the original John Doe letter. Ann, who has fallen in love with John, desperately tries to talk him out of jumping (saying that the first John Doe has already died for the sake of humanity), and Hansen and his neighbors tell him of their plan to restart their John Doe Club. Convinced not to kill himself, John leaves, carrying a fainted Ann in his arms, and Henry turns to Norton and says, "There you are, Norton! The people! Try and lick that!".

== Cast ==
- Gary Cooper as John Doe / Long John Willoughby
- Barbara Stanwyck as Ann Mitchell
- Edward Arnold as D. B. Norton
- Walter Brennan as the Colonel
- Spring Byington as Mrs. Mitchell
- James Gleason as Henry Connell
- Gene Lockhart as Mayor Lovett
- Rod La Rocque as Ted Sheldon
- Irving Bacon as "Beany"
- Regis Toomey as Bert Hansen
- J. Farrell MacDonald as "Sourpuss" (Mr. Smithers)
- Warren Hymer as "Angelface"
- Harry Holman as Mayor Hawkins
- Andrew Tombes as Spencer
- Pierre Watkin as Hammett
- Stanley Andrews as Western
- Mitchell Lewis as Bennett
- Charles Wilson as Charlie Dawson
- Vaughan Glaser as governor
- Sterling Holloway as Dan
- Ann Doran as Mrs. Hansen (uncredited)
- Harry Davenport as former owner of The Bulletin (uncredited)
- Garry Owen as sign painter (uncredited)

== Production ==
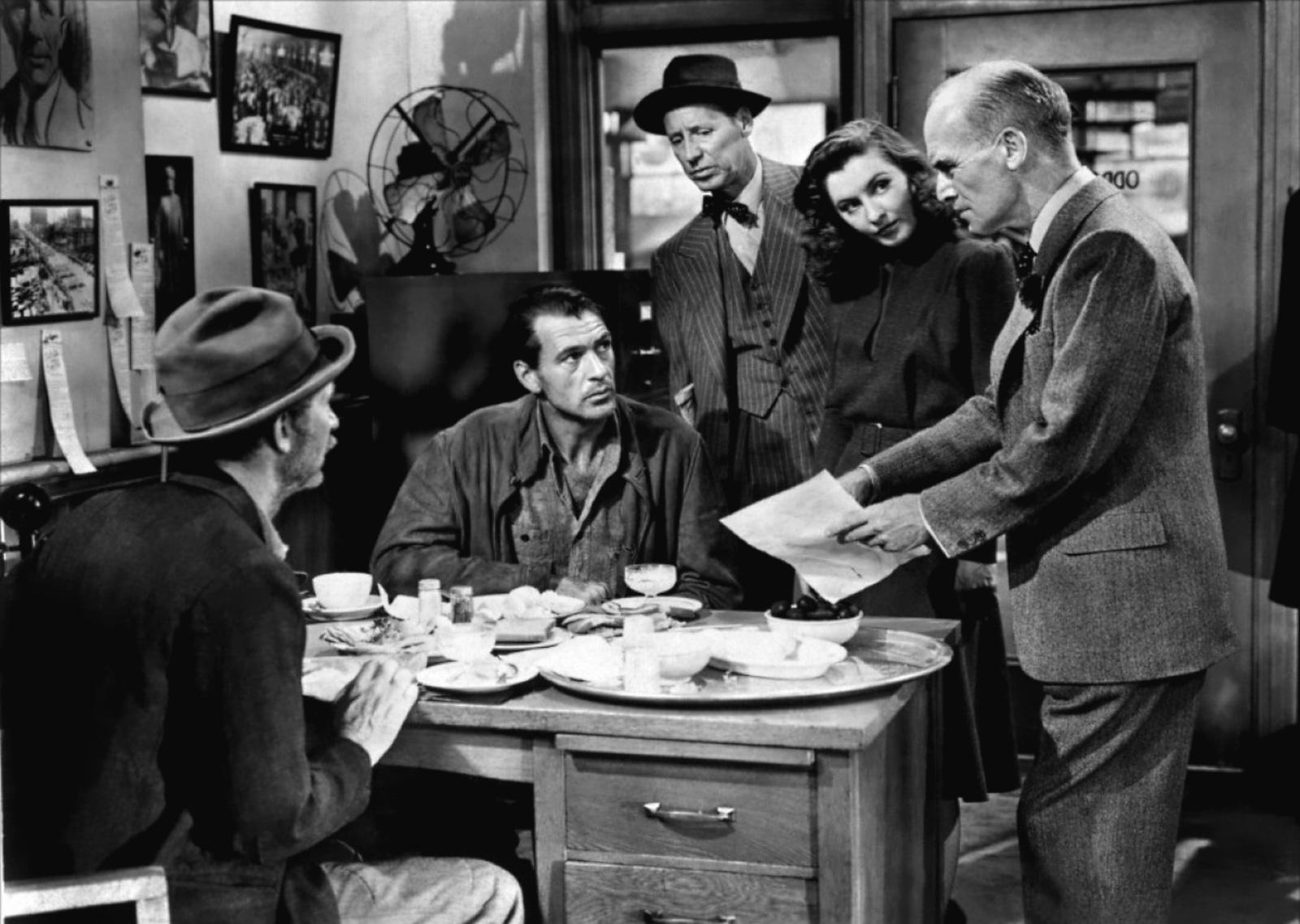
Walter Brennan, Gary Cooper, Irving Bacon, Barbara Stanwyck, and James Gleason in Meet John Doe

The film was screenwriter Robert Riskin's last collaboration with Capra. The screenplay was derived from a 1939 film treatment, titled "The Life and Death of John Doe", written by Richard Connell and Robert Presnell who would go on to be the recipients of the film's sole Academy Award nomination for Best Original Story. The treatment was based upon Connell's 1922 Century Magazine story titled "A Reputation".

Gary Cooper was always Frank Capra's first choice to play John Doe. Cooper had agreed to the part without reading a script for two reasons: He had enjoyed working with Capra on their earlier collaboration, Mr. Deeds Goes to Town (1936), and he wanted to work with Barbara Stanwyck. The role of the hardbitten news reporter, however, was initially offered to Ann Sheridan, but the first choice for the role had been turned down by Warner Bros. Pictures due to a contract dispute, and Olivia de Havilland was similarly contacted, albeit unsuccessfully.

Director Frank Capra later described the film's ending as one of its most challenging aspects. In an interview, he noted that multiple endings were attempted and that the final version was chosen as "the one we were least dissatisfied with." Capra suggested that the difficulty in concluding the story may have stemmed from structural issues earlier in the narrative, stating that if a film cannot be ended satisfactorily, "perhaps the construction somewhere in the story is wrong." He also observed that the film's thematic and motivational elements may have become "tangled", complicating its resolution.

Despite these creative challenges, Capra remarked that the film was financially successful for him and co-writer Robert Riskin, as they independently financed and owned the production, allowing them to profit even though it was not among his biggest box-office hits.

The composer selected was frequent Capra collaborator Dimitri Tiomkin, who also did the scores for Capra's Lost Horizon, Mr. Smith Goes to Washington and It's a Wonderful Life. He later won two music Oscars for the non-Capra film High Noon.

== Reception ==
Bosley Crowther, the film critic for The New York Times wrote that John Willoughby was just the latest of the everyman that Frank Capra had portrayed in earlier films:

With an excellent script by Mr. Riskin—overwritten in many spots, it is true—Mr. Capra has produced a film which is eloquent with affection for gentle people, for the plain, unimpressive little people who want reassurance and faith. Many of his camera devices are magnificent in the scope of their suggestion, and always he tells his story well, with his customary expert spacing of comedy and serious drama. Only space prevents us from enthusing loudly about individual "touches".

In the Variety review, there was a more critical look at the plot:

The synthetic fabric of the story is the weakness of the production, despite the magnificence of the Frank Capra-directed superstructure. But Robert Riskin, who wrote the screenplay from an original story by Richard Connell and Robert Presnell, leaves the audience at the finale with scarcely more than the hope that some day selfishness, fraud and deceit will be expunged from human affairs."

The film is recognized by American Film Institute in these lists:

- 2006: AFI's 100 Years ... 100 Cheers – No. 49

== Adaptations ==
Meet John Doe was dramatized as a radio play on the September 28, 1941 broadcast of The Screen Guild Theater, starring Gary Cooper, Barbara Stanwyck and Edward Arnold in their original roles.

A musical stage version of the film, written by Eddie Sugarman and composed by Andrew Gerle, was produced by Ford's Theatre in Washington, DC, from March 16 to May 20, 2007, featuring Heidi Blickenstaff as Ann Mitchell and James Moye as John Willoughby/John Doe. Donna Lynne Champlin had previously appeared as Ann Mitchell in workshop versions of the show. After an off-Broadway stint, the Chicago production of the musical was presented at the Porchlight Music Theatre from March 5 to April 17, 2011, under the direction of Jim Beaudry, musical direction by Eugene Dizon, featuring Elizabeth Lanza as Ann Mitchell and Karl Hamilton as John Willoughby/John Doe, garnering a Jeff Award nomination for Actress in a Principal Role – Musical for Elizabeth Lanza. Due to this production, R&H Theatricals has licensed the show for future productions.

A Bollywood remake, Main Azaad Hoon, was released in 1989, starring Amitabh Bachchan.

== Restoration and home media ==
In 1945 Capra and Riskin sold all rights in Meet John Doe to Sherman S. Krellberg's Goodwill Pictures, a New York distributor.

While in Goodwill's possession, the original camera negative deteriorated due to poor storage and was eventually destroyed. The Library of Congress created a fresh preservation negative in the 1970s by combining Goodwill's surviving 35mm prints with the Warner Bros. studio print.

Since its copyright was not renewed and it entered the public domain in 1969, the film has received numerous copies on home video for years, sourced from inferior quality prints, while the restored LoC print remains in storage. In 2001 Ken Barnes' Laureate Presentations undertook a digital restoration of the best available European print. It has been released on DVD by Sanctuary (UK) and VCI (US). The LoC print was used for the 2024 high definition Blu-ray released by ClassicFlix in 2024.

== See also ==
- List of Christmas films
