= Robert Presnell Jr. =

American screenwriter (1914–1986)

- Born: July 21, 1914; Chicago, Illinois, U.S.
- Died: June 14, 1986 (aged 71); Los Angeles, California, U.S.
- Occupation: Screenwriter
- Spouse(s): Kay Brown (divorced) Marsha Hunt (m. 1946)
- Children: 2
- Parent: Robert Presnell Sr. (father)

Robert Presnell Jr. (July 21, 1914 – June 14, 1986) was an American screenwriter. He became the director of radio shows such as I Love a Mystery and The Orson Welles Show.

Some of Presnell's notable films include Man in the Attic and Conspiracy of Hearts, which was nominated at the 18th Golden Globe Awards for Best Film Promoting International Understanding. Presnell also wrote several memorable episodes of The Twilight Zone.

== Early life and career ==
Presnell was born in Chicago, the son of Robert Presnell Sr. and his Puerto Rican actress wife, Cecilia Callejo. Aside from being a producer and serving officer in WW2 Pacific theatre, Presnell Sr. was also a screenwriter making his son a second-generation writer.

He started his writing career as a reporter for the Milwaukee Journal. After this stint, Presnell became a freelance writer of articles and short stories for magazines. He then moved to New York City in the late 1930s, where he established a career writing, directing, and producing radio programs.

== Film and television ==
In the mid-1940s, Presnell relocated to Los Angeles, California, where he first started working on radio with Orson Welles and then as a writer of films and television dramas such as the I Love a Mystery series and Cuban Pete (1947). He also co-wrote Hollywood Fights Back, the 1947 radio broadcast in which 60 famous actors and filmmakers spoke out against the Hollywood blacklist. His wife, the actress and activist Marsha Hunt, said in an interview that their involvement in this radio broadcast was held against both of them later on and that despite the existence of a caveat that would have given them an out from being blacklisted, they refused to renounce their position.

In the 1950s, he wrote the screenplays for the movies Man in the Attic (1953), A Life in the Balance (1955), Screaming Eagles (1956), The Rawhide Years (1956), and Under the Sahara Sun (1957). He also wrote episodes for TV series such as The George Sanders Mystery Theater, Lux Video Theatre, Studio One, and The Twilight Zone.

Presnell was credited with the screenplay of the 1960 British film Conspiracy of Hearts, which was directed by Ralph Thomas. It starred Lilli Palmer, Sylvia Syms, Yvonne Mitchell, and Ronald Lewis, and was nominated for a Golden Globe Award. According to one source, however, Presnell served as a “front” for his fellow screenwriter Dalton Trumbo, who was unable to write films under his own name because he was included in the Hollywood blacklist. It is not clear whether Trumbo did contribute to the script since this issue is further complicated by the fact that the film is based on the teleplay by Dale Pitt and that Presnell was announced as the screenwriter in August 1956 for $20,000. The screenplay was completed in April 1957, the same year The Green-Eyed Blonde was released. This film was written by Trumbo and was credited to Sally Stubblefield, who served as his front.

Presnell wrote his wife's 1960 documentary A Call From (later renamed A Call from the Stars), about the international refugee crisis. In the 1960s, he wrote the films Let No Man Write My Epitaph (1960), 13 West Street (1962), and The Third Day (1965). In the 1970s, he wrote the scripts of the so-called TV Movies such as The Secret Night Caller (1975) and Smash-Up on Highway 5 (1976) as well as two episodes of the miniseries Rich Man, Poor Man – Book II.

Presnell served on the board of directors of the Writers Guild of America/West as well as in its arbitration committee. He was also able to complete a novel called Edgell’s Island, which was published by Dial Press in 1951.

== Activism ==
He strongly supported Amnesty International and the anti-nuclear organization SANE. In 1947, he and Hunt became members of the Committee for the First Amendment along with other Hollywood figures such as John Huston, William Wyler, Humphrey Bogart, and Lauren Bacall. The group was founded as a way of supporting the Hollywood Ten, a group of writers and directors who refused to tell the House Committee on Un-American Activities whether they were or had ever been Communist Party members. In 1955, Presnell and Hunt also traveled overseas to support the United Nations' initiatives in Third World countries such as those addressing hunger and promoting world peace.

== Personal life ==
Presnell was first married to Kay Brown, with whom he had one child named Peter. On February 10, 1946, he married the actress Marsha Hunt, to whom he remained married until his death. Presnell met Hunt at a birthday party for Orson Welles. The Presnells also adopted Chon Kai Yin, an orphan from Hong Kong.

He died on June 14, 1986, at the age of 71, at his home in Sherman Oaks, California after suffering heart ailments for many years.

== Credits ==
Film/Television	Notes	Production company
I Love a Mystery	Director (1939–1944)	NBC
The Orson Welles Show	Director (1941–1942)	CBS Radio
Hollywood Fights Back	Writer (1947)	n/a
Edgell's Island	Writer (1951)	Dial Press
Schlitz Playhouse	TV series "Apple of his Eye" (1952)	Meridian Productions
Man in the Attic	Screenplay (1953)	Panoramic Productions, Leonard Goldstein
A Life in the Balance	Screenplay (1955)	Tele-Voz S.A., Panoramic Productions
Screaming Eagles	Screenplay (1956)	Bischoff-Diamond Corporation
The Rawhide Years	Adaptation (1956)	Universal International Pictures
The George Sanders Mystery Theater	TV series "The People vs. Anne Tobin" (1957)	Screen Gems
Lux Video Theater	TV series "The softest Music" (1957)	J. Walter Thompson Agency
Legend of the Lost	Screenplay (1957)	Batjac Productions, Dear Film Produzione
Studio One in Hollywood	TV series "The Left-Handed Welcome" (1958)	CBS Television Network
Wink of an Eye	uncredited (1958)	Ivan Tors Productions
Conspiracy of Hearts	Screenplay (1960)	The Rank Organisation
The Twilight Zone	TV series "The Chaser" (1960)	CBS Television Network
First Person	TV series "At the Railing" (1960)	CBC
Let No Man Write My Epitaph	Screenplay (1960)	Columbia Pictures Corporation
13 West Street	Screenplay (1962)	Ladd Enterprises
Follow the Sun	TV series "A Ghost in Her Gazebo" (1962)	20th Century Fox Television
The Eleventh Hour	TV series "A Full Moon Every Night" (1964)	Arena Productions, MGM Television
Mr. Novak	TV series "The Tender Twigs" (1965)	MGM Television
The Third Day	Screenplay (1965)	Warner Bros.
The Virginian	TV series "The Crooked Path" (1968)	NBC, Reveu Studios, Universal Television
Ritual of Evil	TV movie (1970)	Universal Pictures, Universal Television
Bracken's World	TV series: "Don't You Cry for Susannah" (1969); "Preview in Samarkand" (1970)	20th Century Fox Television
McCloud	TV series "Somebody's Out to Get Jennie" (1971)	Glen A. Larson Productions, Universal Television
Banacek	TV series "No Sign of the Cross" (1972)	Universal Television
All My Darling Daughters	TV movie (1972)	Groverton Productions, Universal Television
Norman Corwin Presents	TV series "A Matter of Life and Death" (1972)	Group W Productions, Arjo Productions, CBC
The Secret Night Caller	TV movie (1975)	Charles Fries Productions, Penthouse Video
Rich Man, Poor Man - Book II	TV series: "Chapter III" (1976); "Chapter VII" (1976)	Universal Television
Smash-Up on Interstate 5	TV movie (1976)	Filmways Television
King's Crossing	TV series "One Afternoon" (1982)	Lorimar Productions
