= The Secret Night Caller =

1975 American television film

- Genre: Drama
- Written by: Robert Presnell Jr.
- Directed by: Jerry Jameson
- Starring: Robert Reed; Hope Lange; Sylvia Sidney; Robin Mattson
- Country of origin: United States
- Original language: English

Production
- Running time: 90 min.
- Production companies: Chuck Fries Productions, Inc. NBC Entertainment

Original release
- Network: NBC
- Release: February 18, 1975

The Secret Night Caller, is a 1975 American television film directed by Jerry Jameson.

== Plot ==
Husband, father and IRS tax agent Fred Durant, despite being a respected suburbanite, is often plagued by lewd thoughts. To satisfy his thoughts, in the evening, he anonymously calls women and releases his perverse thoughts on them. During one of these calls, Charlotte, a coworker who works in Fred's office hears these calls and is so shocked by them that she winds up hospitalized after a car accident. After this, Fred confesses his lewd desires to a psychiatrist.

After being emasculated by his wife and mother, Fred empowers himself with obscene phone calls. Later, he attacks his wife and a stripper who shames him. In the final act, Fred drunkenly babbles about his regrets and his sexless marriage prior to exploding with rage.

== Production ==
It was released in February 18, 1975 on NBC.

== Reception ==
Steven Puchalski of Shock Cinema Magazine criticized the script's psychology, stating that it was "all too simplistic" and called the finale a "mess of bad decisions and violence." However, he did praise Robert Reed's performance as Durant, saying "Damn, I didn't think Reed had it in him!". He also stated, "you almost begin to sympathize with this disturbed schmuck." when referring to Durant's mental breakdown. Cranky Lesbian also praised Reed's performance, stating it was "wonderfully sensitive" and "tightly controlled". She criticized the film's tonal shifts, noting that although the first half was "relatively amusing," the second half became "just plain dark".

Lisa Marie Bowman of The Shattered Lens noted that Durant was meant to come across as being the exact opposite of Mike Brady of The Brady Bunch, stating that "whereas Mike Brady was the perfect father, Freddy is cold, distant, and repressed". She stated that although Fred was surrounded by a "fine" supporting cast, it was "impossible not to associate Robert Reed with the show". A reporter of The Evening News also noted the contrast, stating that the role of Durant was "offbeat casting for Reed".
