= Robert Presnell Sr. =

American journalist and filmmaker

- Born: April 29, 1894; Lake View, Iowa, U.S.
- Died: February 12, 1969 (aged 74); Burbank, California, U.S.
- Occupations: Journalist, screenwriter, filmmaker
- Children: Robert Presnell Jr.

Robert Richard Presnell Sr. (April 29, 1894 – February 12, 1969) was an American journalist, screenwriter, and filmmaker who worked on Hollywood films, made war propaganda films for the military during World War II, and worked on documentaries. He was the father of Robert Presnell Jr.

Presnell was born in Lake View, Iowa. He served in the signal corps during World War II. He lauded the value and experiences of war time filmmakers.

At the 14th Academy Awards, he was nominated for an Academy Award in the category Best Story for the film Meet John Doe.

His third marriage was to actress Cecilia Callejo.

== Theater ==
- The Urgent Air a play in three acts
- Weep No More, a comedy drama adapted from an Italian play

== Filmography ==
=== Writer ===
- The Big Pond (1930), co-wrote screenplay
- Terror Aboard (1933), co-wrote screenplay
- Money and the Woman (1940)
- Meet John Doe (1941), based on "A Reputation" a 1922 story in Century Magazine by Richard Connell. Academy Award nominee for best original story
- The Guilty (1947), based on based on "Two Men in a Furnished Room" a 1941 story in Detective Fiction Weekly by Cornell Woolrich

=== Producer ===
- Left Over Ladies (1931)
- Massacre (1934)
- Midnight Alibi (1934)
- The Girl on the Front Page (1936)
- Four Days' Wonder (1936)
- Girl Overboard (1937)
- When Love Is Young (1937)
- Night Key (1937)
- Carnival Queen (1937)
- That's My Story (1937)
- For You I Die (1947)
- Sofia (1948)
- Girl on the Run (1953)
