= Passport to Alcatraz =

1940 film

- Directed by: Lewis D. Collins
- Written by: Albert DeMond
- Produced by: Larry Darmour
- Starring: Jack Holt; Noah Beery; Cecilia Callejo
- Cinematography: James S. Brown Jr.
- Edited by: Dwight Caldwell
- Music by: Lee Zahler
- Production company: Larry Darmour Productions
- Distributed by: Columbia Pictures
- Release date: June 6, 1940
- Running time: 60 minutes
- Country: United States
- Language: English

Passport to Alcatraz is a 1940 American thriller film directed by Lewis D. Collins and starring Jack Holt, Noah Beery and Cecilia Callejo.

== Cast ==
- Jack Holt as George Hollister
- Noah Beery as Ray Nolan
- Cecilia Callejo as Karol Roy
- Maxie Rosenbloom as Hank Kircher
- C. Henry Gordon as Leon Fenten
- Guy Usher as Thomas L. Lindsey - District Attorney
- Clay Clement as Drexel Stuyvesunt
- Ivan Lebedeff as Bogen
- Ben Welden as Bender
- Robert Fiske as Reed
- Harry Cording as Jeffers
