= Cecilia Callejo =

American actress (1907–2003)

- Cecilia Callejo, from a 1938 publicity photo
- Born: Cecilia Lucila Callejo Correa; October 31, 1907; Manati, Puerto Rico
- Died: August 18, 2003 (aged 95); Tujunga, California, U.S.
- Resting place: San Fernando Mission Cemetery
- Other names: Cecilia Callejo Y Correa Presnell, Cecelia Callejo
- Occupation: Actress
- Years active: 1937–1949
- Spouse: Robert Presnell Sr. (1939–1969; his death)
- Relatives: Robert Presnell Jr. (stepson)

Cecilia Lucila Callejo Correa (October 31, 1907 – August 18, 2003), known as Cecilia Callejo, was an American actress and dancer, born in Puerto Rico. She appeared in films, including It's a Wonderful World (1939), Passport to Alcatraz (1940), and The Cisco Kid Returns (1945).

== Early life ==
Callejo was born in Manatí, Puerto Rico and raised in New York, one of the twelve children of composer and musicologist Fernando Callejo Ferrer and his wife Trinidad, a pianist. She studied dance with La Argentina. Musicians Olga Samaroff and Leopold Stokowski helped her make connections in Hollywood.

== Career ==
Callejo appeared in films in the 1930s and 1940s, including Outlaw Express (1938), The Renegade Ranger (1938), Dramatic School (1938), Verbena Tragica (Block Party, 1939), It's a Wonderful World (1939), Passport to Alcatraz (1940), The Falcon in Mexico (1944), Marriage is a Private Affair (1944), and The Cisco Kid Returns (1945). In 1948, she coached Jennifer Jones on her Cuban accent for We Were Strangers (1949).

On stage, Callejo danced on a program with Ruth St. Denis and others in 1933, and at a benefit show in Los Angeles in 1937. She appeared in a 1939 Los Angeles production of Desert Song. She had one Broadway credit, in the original cast of the mystery melodrama The Cat Screams (1942).

== Personal life ==
Callejo married screenwriter Robert Presnell Sr. in 1939, as his third wife; he died in 1969. She died in Tujunga, California in 2003, aged 95 years.
