= Verbena Tragica =

- Directed by: Charles Lamont
- Written by: Jean Bart; Miguel de Zárraga
- Produced by: Jaime del Amo
- Starring: Fernando Soler; Luana Alcañiz; Juan Torena; Pilar Arcos; Cecilia Callejo; Romualdo Tirado; Carlos Villarías; Danton Ferrero
- Production company: Cantabria Films
- Distributed by: Columbia Pictures
- Release date: 1939
- Running time: 75 min.
- Language: Spanish

Verbena Trágica (Tragic Festival, also known as Block Party) is a 1939 film directed by Charles Lamont. The film was made in 1938 in the Spanish language only, unusual for the time but most likely due to the film's themes of adultery and revenge.

In 1996, the film was deemed to be "culturally, historically, or aesthetically significant" by the United States Library of Congress and selected for preservation in the National Film Registry.

== Plot ==
On the eve of Columbus Day festivities in New York, the boxer Mateo Vargas is released early from a jail term he served after he struck a police officer. He returns home for a surprise reunion with his family, but his wife Blanca faints. Mateo learns from her doctor that she is pregnant. Mateo is shocked, and knows that he cannot be the father. His trainer wants him to return to the boxing ring, but Mateo is too preoccupied with Blanca's infidelity. While he was in jail, Blanca had been seeing Claudio, the fiancé of Mateo's sister Lola. When Lola tells her suspicions to her mother, she slaps Lola. Vargas confronts Blanca about her pregnancy, but she refuses to name the father. Mateo becomes obsessed with finding his wife's lover.

== Cast ==
- Mateo Vargas – Fernando Soler
- Blanca – Luana de Alcaňiz
- Claudio – Juan Torena
- Mamita – Pilar Arcos
- Lola – Cecilia Callejo
- Pepito – Jorge Mari
- Manuel – Carlos Villarías
- José Perez – Romualdo Tirado
- Luis – Sergio de Karlo
- Tensita – Leonor Turich
