= Jean Bart (writer) =

American dramatist (c.1876–1955)

- Born: Marie Antoinette Vilardell c.1876 France
- Died: March 6, 1955; Manhattan, New York, U.S.
- Other names: Marie Sarlabous, Marie de Sarlabous
- Occupations: Scenarist and playwright
- Years active: 1915 - 1945
- Known for: The Squall
- Spouse: Emile Joseph Sarlabous (m. 1900–1931)
- Children: 1
- Relatives: Joseph Fields (son-in-law)

Jean Bart (c.1876–1955; pseudonym of Marie Antoinette Sarlabous) was a French-born American playwright and screenwriter. She began writing silent film scenarios under her married name in 1915, but after America entered the Great War she adopted as a pen name that of the French naval hero, Jean Bart. Her greatest success came with the long-running Broadway melodrama, The Squall (1926). She had two other plays produced on Broadway by 1932, and continued writing scenarios and screenplays up through 1945.

== Biography ==
As Marie Antoinette Vilardell, she was born in France sometime during 1876 or 1877. According to multiple US Census returns, her father was born in Spain and her mother in Belgium, while her first language was French. She was fluent in English, Spanish, and Italian, besides her native French.

She married Dr. Emile Joseph Sarlabous (Note: His first name is often given in various forms: Emil, Emile, and Emilio.) on June 14, 1900, at the St. Peter's Episcopal Church in the Chelsea neighborhood of Manhattan. Sarlabous was from Cuba, the son of the French Consul General there and a Cuban woman. He came to the United States for training as a doctor, gaining his M.D. from New York University in 1883. He became a naturalized US citizen in 1884. The marriage, under the then prevailing concept of coverture, automatically granted her the legal standing of her husband, and so she become a naturalized US citizen. The couple had one child, Germaine Emilie Sarlabous, born in Manhattan, who married Joseph Fields.

She died March 6, 1955, in New York City, with The New York Times obituary giving only her stage name and citing her age as 75.

== Works ==
=== As Maria de Sarlabous ===
- The Sin of Napoleon (1915 scenario) with Andreas de Segurola for Mirror Films, Inc.
- A Prince in a Pawnshop (1916 scenario) with Andreas de Segurola for Greater Vitagraph.
- Grandma Knew Best (1918 operetta book) with music by Gabrielle Sibella.

=== As Jean Bart ===
- The Flaming Omen (1917 film)
- The Squall (1926 play; film version 1929)
- Man Who Reclaimed His Head (play; film version 1934)
- Verbena trágica aka Tragic Festival (1939 film)
- The Mad Empress (1939 film)
- Strange Confession (1945 film)
