= Blondie (film series) =

American comedy film series based on the comic strip Blondie

Poster for Blondie, the first film in the series.

The Blondie film series is an American comedy film series based on the comic strip of the same name, created by Chic Young. The series featured Penny Singleton as Blondie Bumstead and Arthur Lake as Dagwood Bumstead. Concurrent with the films, the same cast reprised their roles in the Blondie radio series.

Columbia Pictures produced the films from 1938 to 1943, and popular demand brought them back in 1945. Columbia later reissued the Blondie features, beginning with the first film in the series.

Columbia used the series to showcase many of its contract players. Rita Hayworth was featured in Blondie on a Budget; Glenn Ford in Blondie Plays Cupid, Larry Parks and Janet Blair in Blondie Goes to College, Shemp Howard in Blondie Knows Best, and Adele Jergens in Blondie's Anniversary. Other roles were taken by Columbia contractees Doris Houck, Bruce Bennett, Lloyd Bridges, Ann Doran, Stanley Brown, Richard Fiske, Bud Jamison, Eddie Laughton, John Tyrrell, Alyn Lockwood, Jimmy Lloyd, Walter Soderling, Gay Nelson, and Ross Ford.

Faithfulness to the comic strip was a major concern of the creators of the film series. Little touches were added that were iconic to the strip, like the appearance of Dagwood's famous sandwiches - and the running gag of Dagwood colliding with the mailman amid a flurry of letters (which preceded the title sequence in the TV versions distributed by King Features). The films were typical of family-fare situational comedies of the period, and are endearingly funny in a low-key way. As the series progressed, the Bumstead children grew from toddlers to young adults onscreen. Larry Simms as Baby Dumpling (later known as Alexander) reprised his role in all the films, and Danny Mummert as Alvin Fuddle appeared in more than twenty of the films. Daughter Cookie was played by three different child actresses, beginning in 1942 with her first appearance (as an infant) in Blondie's Blessed Event, the eleventh entry in the series. Daisy had pups in the twelfth episode, Blondie for Victory (1942). Rounding out the regular supporting cast, character actor Jonathan Hale played Dagwood's irascible boss, J.C. Dithers. The Bumsteads' neighbors, the Woodleys, were oddly missing from the series. The Woodleys were in the last film, Beware of Blondie.

== Films ==
Twenty-eight films were produced by Columbia Pictures between 1938 and 1950:

1. Blondie (1938)
2. Blondie Meets the Boss (1939)
3. Blondie Takes a Vacation (1939)
4. Blondie Brings Up Baby (1939)
5. Blondie on a Budget (1940)
6. Blondie Has Servant Trouble (1940)
7. Blondie Plays Cupid (1940)
8. Blondie Goes Latin (1941)
9. Blondie in Society (1941)
10. Blondie Goes to College (1942)
11. Blondie's Blessed Event (1942)
12. Blondie for Victory (1942)
13. It's a Great Life (1943)
14. Footlight Glamour (1943)
15. Leave It to Blondie (1945)
16. Life with Blondie (1945)
17. Blondie's Lucky Day (1946)
18. Blondie Knows Best (1946)
19. Blondie's Big Moment (1947)
20. Blondie's Holiday (1947)
21. Blondie in the Dough (1947)
22. Blondie's Anniversary (1947)
23. Blondie's Reward (1948)
24. Blondie's Secret (1948)
25. Blondie's Big Deal (1949)
26. Blondie Hits the Jackpot (1949)
27. Blondie's Hero (1950)
28. Beware of Blondie (1950)
