= Blondie (1938 film) =

1938 comedy film

- Directed by: Frank R. Strayer
- Written by: Richard Flournoy
- Based on: Blondie by Chic Young
- Produced by: Robert Sparks
- Starring: Penny Singleton; Arthur Lake
- Cinematography: Henry Freulich
- Edited by: Gene Havlick
- Music by: Leigh Harline; Ben Oakland
- Production company: King Features Syndicate
- Distributed by: Columbia Pictures (theatrical release); King Features Entertainment
- Release date: November 30, 1938
- Running time: 70 min.
- Country: United States
- Language: English

Blondie is a 1938 American comedy film directed by Frank Strayer, based on the comic strip of the same name, created by Chic Young. The screenplay was written by Richard Flournoy. The plot involves the Bumsteads' fifth anniversary, Dagwood trying to get a raise, and Blondie trying to buy new furniture.

This is the first of 28 films based on the comic strip; Columbia Pictures produced them from 1938 to 1943, and popular demand brought them back in 1945. When the Blondie film series came to an end with Beware of Blondie in 1950, it was announced as being replaced with a series of Gasoline Alley movies. However, only two such films were made, Gasoline Alley (1951) and Corky of Gasoline Alley (1951). Columbia then reissued the Blondie features, beginning with the first film in the series.

Columbia used the series to showcase many of its contract players. Rita Hayworth was featured in Blondie on a Budget; Glenn Ford in Blondie Plays Cupid, Larry Parks and Janet Blair in Blondie Goes to College, Shemp Howard in Blondie Knows Best, and Adele Jergens in Blondie's Anniversary. Other roles were taken by Columbia contractees Doris Houck, Bruce Bennett, Lloyd Bridges, Ann Doran, Stanley Brown, Richard Fiske, Bud Jamison, Eddie Laughton, John Tyrrell, Alyn Lockwood, Jimmy Lloyd, Walter Soderling, Gay Nelson, and Ross Ford.

== Plot summary ==
Dagwood Bumstead is a good-natured but scatterbrained young salesman at the Dithers Construction company office, with a wife, young son, and dog. He often arrives at work barely on time, after clumsily colliding on foot with the mail carrier.

In this pilot episode, Blondie secretly orders new furniture on credit for their anniversary, not realizing Dagwood is broke because he had helped out a needy friend. Mr. Dithers sends Dagwood to a hotel with orders to have a guest there, Mr. Hazlip, sign a valuable construction contract, but the reluctant Hazlip has the hotel clerk tell Dagwood he is not in.

While lounging on a lobby couch, Dagwood and another gentleman notice that the hotel's vacuum cleaner is broken, and they sneak it into the other man's room where the two of them bond while wasting hours, for fun, trying to repair it, although it's none of their business.

Blondie phones and mistakenly thinks the man's daughter, whom she's never met, is Dagwood's paramour, and asks for a divorce. Meanwhile, Blondie's parents and amorous ex-boyfriend visit her, and the new furniture is repossessed by movers in front of their eyes.

Dagwood, though unlicensed, borrows the parents' car without permission, and collides with a policeman, who notices the stolen vacuum cleaner in it bearing the hotel's name. In court, Blondie pleads with the judge not to jail her husband. To everyone's surprise, the vacuum cleaner gentleman is revealed as the valuable client Mr. Hazlip whom Dagwood had been trying to contact. He willingly signs the Dithers contract, and Blondie negotiates a raise and promotion for Dagwood.

== Cast ==
- Penny Singleton as Blondie Bumstead
- Arthur Lake as Dagwood Bumstead
- Larry Simms as Alexander "Baby Dumpling" Bumstead
- Gene Lockhart as Clarence Percival "C.P." Hazlip
- Jonathan Hale as J.C. Dithers
- Gordon Oliver as Chester Franey
- Danny Mummert as Alvin Fuddle
- Kathleen Lockhart as Mrs. Miller (Blondie's mother)
- Ann Doran as Elsie Hazlip
- Dorothy Moore as Dot Miller (Blondie's sister)
- Fay Helm as Mrs. Fuddle
- Emory Parnell as Police Desk Sergeant
- Ian Wolfe as Judge
- Irving Bacon as Mr. Beazley, Letter Carrier
- Walter Soderling as Morgan
- Dick Curtis as Daily Gazette Reporter
- Edgar Dearing as Hotel Policeman
- Richard Fiske as Nelson, Dithers' Employee
- James Flavin as Policeman in Accident
- Bud Jamison as Repossessor
- Charles Lane as Furniture Salesperson
- David Newell as First Draftsperson
- Emory Parnell as Police Desk Sergeant
- John Rand as Gardener

== Films ==
Twenty-eight films were produced by Columbia Pictures between 1938 and 1950:

1. Blondie (1938)
2. Blondie Meets the Boss (1939)
3. Blondie Takes a Vacation (1939)
4. Blondie Brings Up Baby (1939)
5. Blondie on a Budget (1940)
6. Blondie Has Servant Trouble (1940)
7. Blondie Plays Cupid (1940)
8. Blondie Goes Latin (1941)
9. Blondie in Society (1941)
10. Blondie Goes to College (1942)
11. Blondie's Blessed Event (1942)
12. Blondie for Victory (1942)
13. It's a Great Life (1943)
14. Footlight Glamour (1943)
15. Leave It to Blondie (1945)
16. Life with Blondie (1945)
17. Blondie's Lucky Day (1946)
18. Blondie Knows Best (1946)
19. Blondie's Big Moment (1947)
20. Blondie's Holiday (1947)
21. Blondie in the Dough (1947)
22. Blondie's Anniversary (1947)
23. Blondie's Reward (1948)
24. Blondie's Secret (1948)
25. Blondie's Big Deal (1949)
26. Blondie Hits the Jackpot (1949)
27. Blondie's Hero (1950)
28. Beware of Blondie (1950)

== Preservation ==
Blondie was preserved and restored by the UCLA Film and Television Archive. The restoration's funding was provided by the Packard Humanities Institute. The restoration premiered at the UCLA Festival of Preservation in 2022.
