= Jack Rice =

American actor (1893–1968)

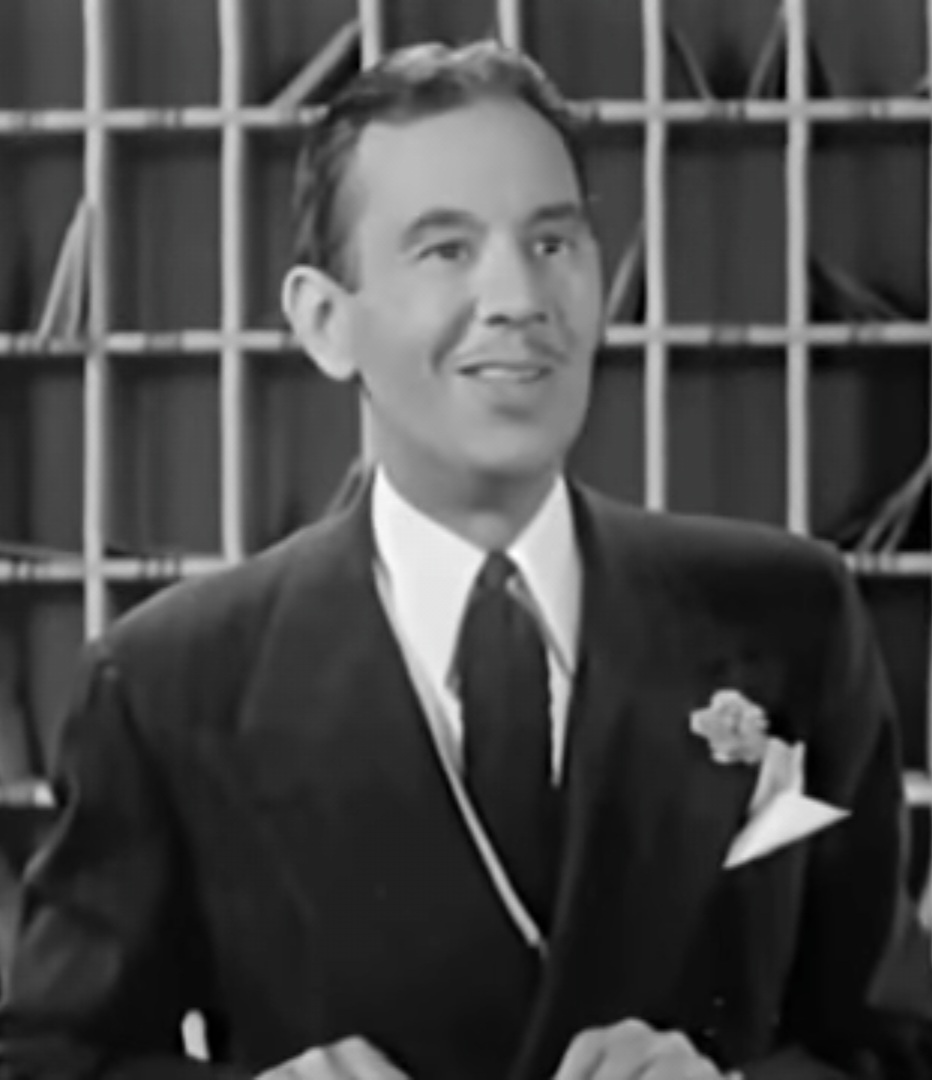
- Rice in Niagara Falls (1941)
- Born: Earl Clifford Rice; May 14, 1893; Grand Rapids, Michigan, U.S.
- Died: December 14, 1968 (aged 75); Woodland Hills, Los Angeles, California, U.S.
- Resting place: Valhalla Memorial Park Cemetery
- Occupation: Actor
- Years active: 1920–1963

Jack Rice (born Earl Clifford Rice; May 14, 1893 – December 14, 1968) was an American actor best known for appearing as the scrounging, freeloading brother-in-law in Edgar Kennedy's series of short domestic comedy films at the RKO studio, and also as "Ollie" (a.k.a. "Oliver Merton" and "Oliver Shaw") in around a dozen of Columbia Pictures's series of the Blondie comic strip.

== Death ==
Born in Grand Rapids, Michigan, Rice died in Woodland Hills at the age of 75. He is buried in Valhalla Memorial Park Cemetery.

== Selected filmography ==
- No Marriage Ties (1933) – Newspaper Office Worker (uncredited)
- Morning Glory (1933) – Newspaperman (uncredited)
- Flying Down to Rio (1933) – Yankee Clipper (uncredited)
- His Greatest Gamble (1934) – Gambling Casino Patron (uncredited)
- The Girl from Missouri (1934) – Party Guest Dancing with Countess (uncredited)
- Lady by Choice (1934) – Nightclub Patron (uncredited)
- Kid Millions (1934) – Ship's Passenger (uncredited)
- Lightning Strikes Twice (1934) – Hotel Desk Clerk (uncredited)
- Break of Hearts (1935) – New Year's Eve Celebrant (uncredited)
- Woman Wanted (1935) – Man Walking With Cane in Hotel (uncredited)
- Hi, Gaucho! (1935) – Pasquale – Horse Thief (uncredited)
- Annie Oakley (1935) – Bit Man in Saloon (uncredited)
- Tough Guy (1936) – Percy (uncredited)
- Love on a Bet (1936) – Passenger Waiting for Washroom (uncredited)
- The Farmer in the Dell (1936) – Charlie (uncredited)
- Silly Billies (1936) – Cavalry Officer (uncredited)
- Murder on a Bridle Path (1936) – Violet's Hotel Manager (uncredited)
- The Last Outlaw (1936) – Card Player (uncredited)
- Rhythm on the Range (1936) – Train Station Smoocher (uncredited)
- Dummy Ache (1936, Short) – Florence's Brother
- The Bride Walks Out (1936) – New Year's Eve Emcee (uncredited)
- Swing Time (1936) – Wedding Guest (uncredited)
- Walking on Air (1936) – Sponsor (uncredited)
- Mummy's Boys (1936) – Second Officer (uncredited)
- The Plough and the Stars (1936) – Minor Role (uncredited)
- Shall We Dance (1937) – Hotel Desk Clerk (uncredited)
- Easy Living (1937) – Man in Ball's Outer Office (uncredited)
- Stage Door (1937) – Playwright (uncredited)
- She Married an Artist (1937) – Attendant (uncredited)
- Lady Behave! (1937) – Clerk (uncredited)
- Wise Girl (1937) – Actor in Department Store Window (uncredited)
- I Met My Love Again (1938) – Professor George B. Stockwell (uncredited)
- Arson Gang Busters (1938) – Bradbury
- Crime Ring (1938) – Goshen's Employee (uncredited)
- Carefree (1938) – Man with Walking Cane (uncredited)
- The Mad Miss Manton (1938) – Doctor (uncredited)
- Little Orphan Annie (1938) – Bugs MacIntosh
- Twelve Crowded Hours (1939) – Professor Busby (uncredited)
- The Flying Irishman (1939) – Airplane Owner Selling It to Corrigan (uncredited)
- The Rookie Cop (1939) – Jewelry Store Owner (uncredited)
- Five Little Peppers and How They Grew (1939) – Mr. Barker (uncredited)
- Those High Grey Walls (1939) – Bruised-Hand Convict (uncredited)
- Sabotage (1939) – Minor Role (uncredited)
- Mr. Smith Goes to Washington (1939) – Lang (uncredited)
- Blondie Brings Up Baby (1939) – Detective with Mason (uncredited)
- Money to Burn (1939) – Thorne
- The Shadow (1940, Serial) – Taylor (uncredited)
- Danger on Wheels (1940) – Parker
- Five Little Peppers at Home (1940) – Bainbridge (uncredited)
- Turnabout (1940) – Second Photographer (uncredited)
- Passport to Alcatraz (1940) – Detective (uncredited)
- We Who Are Young (1940) – Savoy-Carlton Hotel Clerk (uncredited)
- The Lady in Question (1940) – Gaston (uncredited)
- Foreign Correspondent (1940) – Donald (uncredited)
- He Stayed for Breakfast (1940) – Marianne's Chauffeur (uncredited)
- The Lone Wolf Keeps a Date (1940) – Salesman Helping Lanyard (uncredited)
- Ellery Queen, Master Detective (1940) – Rogers' Assistant (uncredited)
- Adventure in Washington (1940) – Announcer (uncredited)
- Men of the Timberland (1941) – MacGregor's Secretary
- Broadway Limited (1941) – Haughty Reporter (uncredited)
- You'll Never Get Rich (1941) – 5th Avenue Jewelry Salesman (uncredited)
- Niagara Falls (1941) – Hotel Clerk
- New York Town (1941) – Oliver (uncredited)
- Brooklyn Orchid (1942) – Hotel Desk Clerk (uncredited)
- Yokel Boy (1942) – Teller (uncredited)
- Take a Letter, Darling (1942) – Salesman (uncredited)
- A Desperate Chance for Ellery Queen (1942) – Railroad Ticket Clerk (uncredited)
- Moonlight Masquerade (1942) – Hotel Clerk (uncredited)
- Enemy Agents Meet Ellery Queen (1942) – Railway Ticket Agent (uncredited)
- The Secret Code (1942, Serial) – Fred, Jensen's Clerk [Chs.2,4]
- Lucky Legs (1942) – Jewelry Salesman (uncredited)
- Reveille with Beverly (1943) – Davis (uncredited)
- Two Weeks to Live (1943) – Hotel Clerk (uncredited)
- She Has What It Takes (1943) – Kimball
- Good Morning, Judge (1943) – Hotel Clerk (uncredited)
- Gildersleeve's Bad Day (1943) – Hotel Clerk Charlie (uncredited)
- Good Luck, Mr. Yates (1943) – Steve (uncredited)
- Gals, Incorporated (1943) – Partridge (uncredited)
- Petticoat Larceny (1943) – Radio Actor (uncredited)
- Honeymoon Lodge (1943) – Surprised Man in Train Station (uncredited)
- Passport to Suez (1943) – Hotel Night Clerk (uncredited)
- So This Is Washington (1943) – Golf Hotel Desk Clerk (uncredited)
- The Adventures of a Rookie (1943) – Jim – Father of Party Guest (uncredited)
- So's Your Uncle (1943) – Designer
- Dangerous Blondes (1943) – Scott (uncredited)
- Crazy House (1943) – Dentist (uncredited)
- A Scream in the Dark (1943) – Desk Clerk at the Harvard Arms (uncredited)
- Campus Rhythm (1943) – Company Rep with Flowers (uncredited)
- Swingtime Johnny (1943) – Bill
- What a Woman! (1943) – Tailor (uncredited)
- Week-End Pass (1944) – Jenkins
- Casanova in Burlesque (1944) – Emory, the Dress Designer (uncredited)
- Hat Check Honey (1944) – C.B.
- Cover Girl (1944) – Reporter (uncredited)
- Hey, Rookie (1944) – Highbrow (uncredited)
- Lady, Let's Dance (1944) – Given
- Louisiana Hayride (1944) – Hotel Clerk (uncredited)
- Ever Since Venus (1944) – Butler (uncredited)
- The Merry Monahans (1944) – Ham Actor (uncredited)
- San Diego, I Love You (1944) – Hotel Clerk (uncredited)
- Goin' to Town (1944) – Clark
- The Mark of the Whistler (1944) – Mailman (uncredited)
- Bowery to Broadway (1944) – Quartette Member (uncredited)
- Hi, Beautiful (1944) – Board Member (uncredited)
- Carolina Blues (1944) – Jerry (uncredited)
- Practically Yours (1944) – Courturier (uncredited)
- Under Western Skies (1945) – Neil Mathews
- Her Lucky Night (1945) – Percy
- Leave It to Blondie (1945) – Ollie Shaw (uncredited)
- Eve Knew Her Apples (1945) – Hotel Clerk (uncredited)
- Boston Blackie Booked on Suspicion (1945) – Mr. Obie (uncredited)
- The Naughty Nineties (1945) – Waiter (uncredited)
- Radio Stars on Parade (1945) – Theater Usher (uncredited)
- Sunset in El Dorado (1945) – Mr. Hollingsworth (uncredited)
- Life with Blondie (1945) – Ollie Shaw (uncredited)
- The Stork Club (1945) – Stork Club Captain #2 (uncredited)
- Because of Him (1946) – Florist (uncredited)
- Meet Me on Broadway (1946) – Grannis (uncredited)
- Blondie's Lucky Day (1946) – Ollie Shaw (uncredited)
- The Runaround (1946) – Information Clerk (uncredited)
- Blondie Knows Best (1946) – Ollie Shaw (uncredited)
- The Best Years of Our Lives (1946) – Apartment Desk Clerk (uncredited)
- Vacation in Reno (1946) – Mr. Shark (uncredited)
- Blondie's Big Moment (1947) – Oliver "Ollie" Merton
- The Pilgrim Lady (1947) – Hotel Clerk
- Blondie's Holiday (1947) – Ollie Shaw
- A Likely Story (1947) – Secretary to the Senator (uncredited)
- Living in a Big Way (1947) – Court Stenographer (uncredited)
- Dark Delusion (1947) – Floorwalker (uncredited)
- They Won't Believe Me (1947) – Tour Conductor (uncredited)
- The Hucksters (1947) – Clerk – Selling Ties (uncredited)
- Cass Timberlane (1947) – Vincent Osprey – Arthur Olliford's Attorney (uncredited)
- Her Husband's Affairs (1947) – Slocum (uncredited)
- It Had to Be You (1947) – Floorwalker (uncredited)
- Blondie's Anniversary (1947) – Ollie Shaw
- The Bride Goes Wild (1948) – Reporter (uncredited)
- The Return of the Whistler (1948) – George Sawyer (uncredited)
- My Dog Rusty (1948) – Jack, the Photographer (uncredited)
- Blondie's Reward (1948) – Ollie Merton
- Blondie's Secret (1948) – Ollie Merton
- Blondie's Big Deal (1949) – Ollie Merton
- Take Me Out to the Ball Game (1949) – Room Clerk (uncredited)
- The Barkleys of Broadway (1949) – Ticket Man (uncredited)
- Take One False Step (1949) – Good Humor Man (uncredited)
- The Sickle or the Cross (1949) – Radio Engineer
- The Good Humor Man (1950) – Roger, Bridegroom (uncredited)
- Beware of Blondie (1950) – Ollie Shaw
- Shakedown (1950) – Floorwalker (uncredited)
- Counterspy Meets Scotland Yard (1950) – Power Company Clerk
- Corky of Gasoline Alley (1951) – Ames (uncredited)
- Aaron Slick from Punkin Crick (1952) – Hotel Clerk (uncredited)
- The Pride of St. Louis (1952) – Voorhees (uncredited)
- The Brigand (1952) – Tailor (uncredited)
- Stars and Stripes Forever (1952) – Mr. Jones (scenes deleted)
- The Silver Whip (1953) – Clyde Morrison, Silver City Telegrapher (uncredited)
- The Marksman (1953) – Clerk
- Ransom! (1956) – George's Assistant (uncredited)
- Crashing Las Vegas (1956) – Wiley
- Too Much, Too Soon (1958) – Druggist (uncredited)
- The 30 Foot Bride of Candy Rock (1959) – Booster (uncredited)
- That Touch of Mink (1962) – Customer at Automat (uncredited)
- Son of Flubber (1963) – 2nd Juror (uncredited) (final film role)
