= Daisy (dog actor) =

Canine actor

- Born: Spooks; 1937
- Died: 1960 (aged 22–23)
- Occupation: Canine actor
- Years active: 1938–1954

Daisy (originally named Spooks) was a canine actor who appeared in more than 50 Hollywood films during the 1930s and 1940s. He was especially well known for appearing in the Blondie franchise.

== Biography ==
Daisy—a cocker spaniel–poodle-terrier mix—was originally named Spooks because his owners noted his timidness as a pup. Born around 1937, he was owned by dog trainer Rennie Renfro, who bought him for $3. He also learned tricks from legendary trainer Rudd Weatherwax.

Daisy was known for his expressive face and trick gestures (averting his eyes; putting his paw in his mouth in panic; leaping across the screen like a flying projectile, etc.). Besides his work in the Blondie comedies, Daisy also appeared with Laurel and Hardy and The Three Stooges, among other stars. Daisy is the main character in two 1945 comedy features: Life with Blondie and Hollywood and Vine. Reportedly, Renfro and Daisy made $1,000 a week, and Renfro used the money to buy them a house in Toluca Lake, California. He was also noted to have had a five-year feud with actress Rita Hayworth. His last known film appearance came in 1954, in the Columbia Pictures comedy short Kids Will Be Kids.

Daisy and his "pups" had their own dog food brand that they promoted in public appearances.

== Selected filmography ==
- Blondie (1938)
- Blondie Meets the Boss (1939)
- Blondie Takes a Vacation (1939)
- Blondie Brings Up Baby (1939)
- Blondie on a Budget (1940)
- Blondie Has Servant Trouble (1940)
- Blondie Plays Cupid (1940)
- Blondie Goes Latin (1941)
- Blondie in Society (1941)
- Blondie Goes to College (1942)
- Blondie's Blessed Event (1942)
- Blondie for Victory (1942)
- It's a Great Life (1943)
- Footlight Glamour (1943)
- Leave It to Blondie (1945)
- Life with Blondie (1945)
- Blondie's Lucky Day (1946)
- Blondie Knows Best (1946)
- Blondie's Big Moment (1947)
- Blondie's Holiday (1947) (uncredited)
- Blondie in the Dough (1947)
- Blondie's Anniversary (1947)
- Blondie's Reward (1948)
- Fighting Back (1948)
- The Valiant Hombre (1948)
- Blondie's Secret (1948)
- Blondie's Big Deal (1949)
- Blondie Hits the Jackpot (1949)
- Blondie's Hero (1950)
- Beware of Blondie (1950)

== See also ==
- List of individual dogs
