= Jerome Cowan =

American actor (1897–1972)

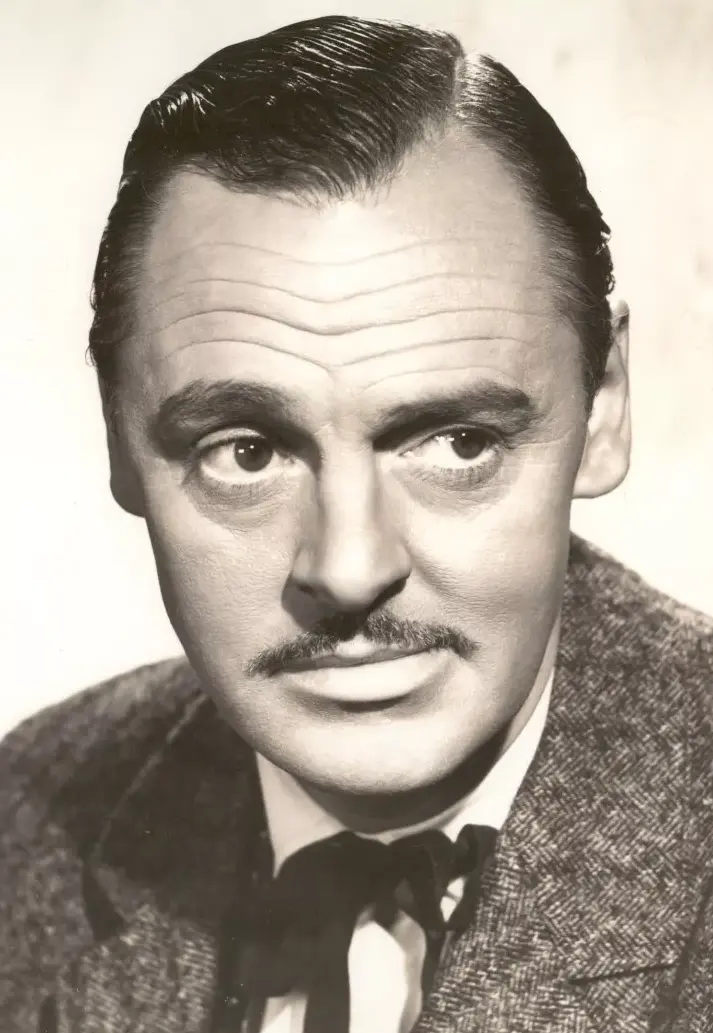
- Cowan in 1940
- Born: Jerome Palmer Cowan; October 6, 1897; New York City, U.S.
- Died: January 24, 1972 (aged 74); Encino, Los Angeles, California, U.S.
- Occupation: Actor
- Years active: 1923–1959 (stage); 1936–1971 (film)
- Spouse: Helen Dodge (m. 1928)
- Children: 2

Jerome Palmer Cowan (October 6, 1897 – January 24, 1972) was an American stage, film, and television actor.

== Early life ==
Cowan was born in New York City, the son of William Cowan, a confectioner of Scottish descent, and Julia Cowan, née Palmer.

== Career ==
=== Stage ===
Cowan's Broadway debut was in We've Got to Have Money (1923). His other Broadway credits include Frankie and Johnnie (1930), Just to Remind You (1931), Rendezvous (1932), The Little Black Book (1932), Marathon (1933), Both Your Houses (1933), As Thousands Cheer (1933), Ladies' Money (1934), Paths of Glory (1935), Boy Meets Girl (1935), My Three Angels (1953), Lunatics and Lovers (1954), Rumple (1957), and Say, Darling (1958).

=== Film ===
Cowan was spotted by Samuel Goldwyn and was given a film contract, his first film being Beloved Enemy.

He appeared in more than one hundred films, but is probably best remembered for two roles in classic films: Miles Archer, the doomed private eye partner of Sam Spade in The Maltese Falcon and Thomas Mara, the hapless district attorney who has to prosecute Santa Claus in Miracle on 34th Street.

Cowan also played Dagwood Bumstead's boss Mr. Radcliffe in several installments of Columbia Pictures' Blondie series. He also appeared in Deadline at Dawn, June Bride, and High Sierra.

=== Television ===
Cowan starred in Not for Publication on the DuMont Television Network in 1952. In 1959 he played Horatio Styles in the episode "Winter Song" of The Alaskans, with Roger Moore. That same year, he made two guest appearances in Perry Mason, starring Raymond Burr. He played murdered playwright Ernest Royce in "The Case of the Lost Last Act" and then Victor Latimore in "The Case of the Artful Dodger." He also appeared in The Twilight Zone episode "The Sixteen-Millimeter Shrine" and guest-starred on Richard Diamond, Private Detective.

In the 1960–1961 television season, Cowan starred as John Larsen, the owner of Comics, Inc., and the boss of Paul Morgan, a young cartoonist portrayed by Tab Hunter in The Tab Hunter Show. In 1962, he guest starred on Mr. Smith Goes to Washington. He also appeared on Daniel Boone and Going My Way, starring Gene Kelly.

In 1964 and 1965, Cowan appeared as the demanding Herbert Wilson in The Tycoon. Earlier in 1963, he appeared on The Real McCoys in its final season on CBS.

In 1968 Cowan played a movie producer on Gomer Pyle - U.S.M.C.

== Personal life and death ==
Cowan was married to the former Helen Dodge. On January 24, 1972, Cowan died of a heart attack at Encino Hospital Medical Center in Encino, California at age 74. He was survived by his wife and two daughters.

== Recognition ==
Cowan has a star at 6251 Hollywood Boulevard in the Television section of the Hollywood Walk of Fame. It was dedicated on February 8, 1960.

== Filmography ==
1. Beloved Enemy (1936) as Tim O'Rourke
2. You Only Live Once (1937) as Dr. Hill
3. Shall We Dance (1937) as Arthur Miller
4. New Faces of 1937 (1937) as Robert Hunt
5. Walter Wanger's Vogues of 1938 (1937) as W. Brockton
6. The Hurricane (1937) as Captain Nagle
7. The Goldwyn Follies (1938) as Director
8. There's Always a Woman (1938) as Nick Shane
9. St. Louis Blues (1939) as Ivan DeBrett
10. The Saint Strikes Back (1939) as Cullis
11. East Side of Heaven (1939) as Claudius De Wolfe
12. Exile Express (1939) as Paul Brandt
13. The Gracie Allen Murder Case (1939) as Daniel Mirche
14. She Married a Cop (1939) as Bob Adams
15. The Old Maid (1939) as Joe Ralston
16. The Great Victor Herbert (1939) as Barney Harris
17. Wolf of New York (1940) as Cosgrave
18. Castle on the Hudson (1940) as Ed Crowley
19. Framed (1940) as Monty de Granville
20. Ma! He's Making Eyes at Me (1940) as Ted Carter
21. Torrid Zone (1940) as Bob Anderson
22. City for Conquest (1940) as 'Dutch'
23. The Quarterback (1940) as Townley
24. Meet the Wildcat (1940) as Digby Vanderhood III
25. Melody Ranch (1940) as Tommy Summerville
26. Street of Memories (1940) as Mr. Gower
27. Victory (1940) as Martin Ricardo
28. High Sierra (1941) as Healy
29. The Round up (1941) as Wade McGee
30. The Great Lie (1941) as Jock Thompson
31. Affectionately Yours (1941) as Cullen
32. Singapore Woman (1941) as Jim North
33. Too Many Blondes (1941) as Ted Bronson
34. Out of the Fog (1941) as Assistant D.A.
35. Kisses for Breakfast (1941) as Lucius Lorimer
36. Rags to Riches (1941) as Marshall Abbott
37. Kiss the Boys Goodbye (1941) as Bert Fisher
38. One Foot in Heaven (1941) as Dr. Horrigan
39. The Maltese Falcon (1941) as Miles Archer
40. The Bugle Sounds (1942) as Mr. Nichols
41. A Gentleman at Heart (1942) as Finchley
42. Mr. and Mrs. North (1942) as Ben Wilson
43. Frisco Lil (1942) as Vince Warren
44. The Girl from Alaska (1942) as Ravenhill
45. Moontide (1942) as Dr. Frank Brothers
46. Thru Different Eyes (1942) as Jim Gardner
47. Joan of Ozark (1942) as Phillip Munson
48. Street of Chance (1942) as Bill Diedrich
49. Who Done It? (1942) as Marco Heller
50. No Place for a Lady (1943) as Eddie Moore
51. Ladies' Day (1943) as Updyke (banker)
52. Mission to Moscow (1943) as Spendler (uncredited)
53. Silver Spurs (1943) as Jerry Johnson
54. Hi'ya, Sailor (1943) as Lou Asher
55. Find the Blackmailer (1943) as D.L. Trees
56. The Crime Doctor's Strangest Case (1943) as Mallory Cartwright
57. The Song of Bernadette (1943) as Emperor Louis Napoleon III
58. Sing a Jingle (1944) as Andrews
59. Mr. Skeffington (1944) as Edward Morrison
60. South of Dixie (1944) as Bill 'Brains' Watson
61. Minstrel Man (1944) as Bill Evans
62. Crime by Night (1944) as Sam Campbell
63. Guest in the House (1944) as Mr. Hackett
64. Fog Island (1945) as Kavanaugh
65. The Crime Doctor's Courage (1945) as Jeffers 'Jeff' Jerome
66. G. I. Honeymoon (1945) as Ace Renaldo
67. Blonde Ransom (1945) as Ice Larson
68. The Jungle Captive (1945) as Detective W.L. Harrigan
69. Hitchhike to Happiness (1945) as Tony Riggs
70. Divorce (1945) as Jim Driscoll
71. Behind City Lights (1945) as Perry Borden
72. Getting Gertie's Garter (1945) as Billy
73. One Way to Love (1946) as A.J. Gunther
74. My Reputation (1946) as George Van Orman
75. Deadline at Dawn (1946) as Lester Brady
76. Claudia and David (1946) as Brian O'Toole
77. The Kid from Brooklyn (1946) as Fight Announcer
78. Murder in the Music Hall (1946) as George Morgan
79. Night in Paradise (1946) as Scribe
80. One Exciting Week (1946) as Al Carter
81. Deadline for Murder (1946) as Lynch
82. Mr. Ace (1946) as Peter Craig
83. Flight to Nowhere (1946) as Gerald Porter
84. Blondie Knows Best (1946) as Charles Peabody
85. Blondie's Big Moment (1947) as George M. Radcliffe (uncredited)
86. The Perfect Marriage (1947) as Addison Manning
87. The Unfaithful (1947) as Prosecuting Attorney
88. Blondie's Holiday (1947) as George M. Radcliffe
89. Miracle on 34th Street (1947) as Dist. Atty. Thomas Mara
90. Riffraff (1947) as Walter F. Gredson
91. Cry Wolf (1947) as Sen. Caldwell
92. Driftwood (1947) as Mayor Snyder
93. Blondie in the Dough (1947) as George Radcliffe
94. Dangerous Years (1947) as Weston
95. Blondie's Anniversary (1947) as George M. Radcliffe
96. Arthur Takes Over (1948) as George Bradford
97. So This Is New York (1948) as Francis Griffin
98. Blondie's Reward (1948) as George M. Radcliffe
99. Wallflower (1948) as Robert 'Bob' James
100. Night Has a Thousand Eyes (1948) as Whitney Courtland
101. June Bride (1948) as Carleton Towne
102. Blondie's Secret (1948) as George Radcliffe
103. Life of St. Paul Series (1949) as Demetrius
104. Blondie's Big Deal (1949) as George M. Radcliffe
105. The Fountainhead (1949) as Alvah Scarret
106. The Girl from Jones Beach (1949) as Mr. Graves – Ruth's Attorney
107. Scene of the Crime (1949) as Arthur Webson
108. Blondie Hits the Jackpot (1949) as George Radcliffe
109. Always Leave Them Laughing (1949) as Elliott Montgomery
110. Joe Palooka Meets Humphrey (1950) as Belden
111. Young Man with a Horn (1950) as Phil Morrison
112. Peggy (1950) as Fred Collins
113. When You're Smiling (1950) as Herbert Reynolds
114. The Fuller Brush Girl (1950) as Harvey Simpson
115. The West Point Story (1950) as Mr. Jocelyn
116. Dallas (1950) as Matt Coulter
117. The Fat Man (1951) as Police Lieutenant Stark
118. Criminal Lawyer (1951) as Walter Medford
119. Disk Jockey (1951) as Marley
120. Magnificent Adventure (1952)
121. The System (1953) as Barry X. Brady
122. Have Rocket, Will Travel (1959) as J.P. Morse
123. Visit to a Small Planet (1960) as George Abercrombie
124. Private Property (1960) as Ed Hogate
125. All in a Night's Work (1961) as Sam Weaver
126. Pocketful of Miracles (1961) as Mayor
127. Critic's Choice (1963) as Joe Rosenfield
128. Black Zoo (1963) as Jerry Stengel
129. The Patsy (1964) as Business Executive (uncredited)
130. John Goldfarb, Please Come Home! (1965) as Ambassadaor Brinkley
131. Frankie and Johnny (1966) as Joe Wilbur (uncredited)
132. Penelope (1966) as Bank Manager
133. The Gnome-Mobile (1967) as Dr. Ramsey
134. The Comic (1969) as Lawrence
135. Gomer Pyle - U.S.M.C. (1968) as Dan Curtis
