= Aaron Stell =

American film editor (1911–1996)

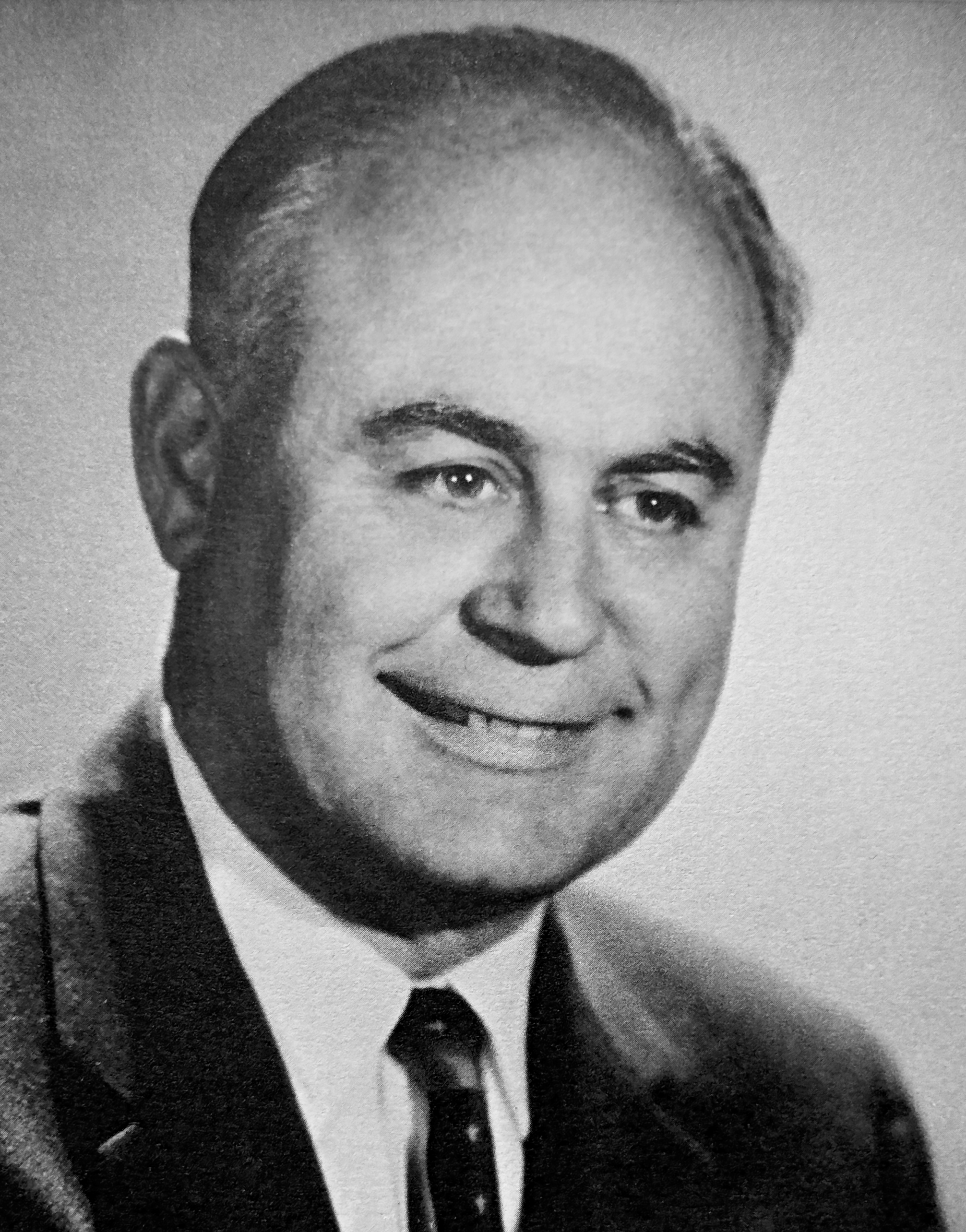
- Born: March 26, 1911; Pennsylvania, United States
- Died: January 7, 1996 (aged 84); Los Angeles, California, United States
- Occupation: Film editor

Aaron Stell (March 26, 1911 – January 7, 1996) was an American film editor with one hundred feature film credits and many additional credits for his television work. He is best known for his work on Touch of Evil (directed by Orson Welles-1958), To Kill a Mockingbird (directed by Robert Mulligan-1962), and Silent Running (directed by Douglas Trumbull-1972).

== Early life ==
Aaron Stell was born on March 26, 1911. After graduating from Los Angeles High School, he worked as a postmaster for Fox Film in the late 1920s.

== Career ==
Stell's earliest editing career was for Columbia Pictures, where he worked at from 1943 to 1955. He then worked for other Hollywood studios for the rest of his career. Touch of Evil, which was directed by Orson Welles, proved difficult for Stell; he was not the initial editor but instead chosen for re-editing, and he noted that Welles became "ill, depressed, and unhappy with the studio's impatience" in the process.

Stell had been selected as a member of the American Cinema Editors. He was nominated for the American Cinema Editors Eddie Award for To Kill a Mockingbird (1962). He was also nominated for Eddies for his television work on an episode of Ben Casey (1961) and on the mini-series Guyana Tragedy: The Story of Jim Jones (1980). In 1996 he shared the American Cinema Editors Career Achievement Award with Desmond Marquette.

== Personal life and death ==
Since the early 1940s, Stell worked as an oil painter. By 1964, he has painted over 50 paintings. Stell died in Los Angeles at age 84.

== Selected filmography ==
Editor
Year	Film	Director	Notes	Other notes
1943	Cowboy in the Clouds	Benjamin H. Kline	First collaboration with Benjamin H. Kline	
1944	Cowboy Canteen	Lew Landers	First collaboration with Lew Landers	
1944	Sundown Valley	Benjamin H. Kline	Second collaboration with Benjamin H. Kline	
1944	She's a Soldier Too	William Castle	First collaboration with William Castle	
1944	Swing in the Saddle	Lew Landers	Second collaboration with Lew Landers	
1944	Cowboy from Lonesome River	Benjamin H. Kline	Third collaboration with Benjamin H. Kline	
1944	Cyclone Prairie Rangers	Benjamin H. Kline	Fourth collaboration with Benjamin H. Kline	
1944	Saddle Leather Law	Benjamin H. Kline	Fifth collaboration with Benjamin H. Kline	
1945	I Love a Mystery	Henry Levin		
1945	Sagebrush Heroes	Benjamin H. Kline	Sixth collaboration with Benjamin H. Kline	
1945	Sing Me a Song of Texas	Vernon Keays	First collaboration with Vernon Keays	
1945	Rough Ridin' Justice	Derwin Abrahams	First collaboration with Derwin Abrahams	
1945	The Return of the Durango Kid	Derwin Abrahams	Second collaboration with Derwin Abrahams	
1945	Boston Blackie's Rendezvous	Arthur Dreifuss	First collaboration with Arthur Dreifuss	
1945	Rustlers of the Badlands	Derwin Abrahams	Third collaboration with Derwin Abrahams	
1945	Outlaws of the Rockies	Ray Nazarro	First collaboration with Ray Nazarro	
1945	Blazing the Western Trail	Vernon Keays	Second collaboration with Vernon Keays	Uncredited
1945	Prison Ship	Arthur Dreifuss	Second collaboration with Arthur Dreifuss	
1946	Frontier Gunlaw	Derwin Abrahams	Fourth collaboration with Derwin Abrahams	
1946	Blondie's Lucky Day	Abby Berlin	First collaboration with Abby Berlin	
1946	It's Great to Be Young	Del Lord	First collaboration with Del Lord	
1946	Blondie Knows Best	Abby Berlin	Second collaboration with Abby Berlin	
1946	Terror Trail	Ray Nazarro	Second collaboration with Ray Nazarro	
1946	Alias Mr. Twilight	John Sturges	First collaboration with John Sturges	
1946	Singin' in the Corn	Del Lord	Second collaboration with Del Lord	
1947	Millie's Daughter	Sidney Salkow	First collaboration with Sidney Salkow	
1947	Bulldog Drummond at Bay	Sidney Salkow	Second collaboration with Sidney Salkow	
1947	Sport of Kings	Robert Gordon		
1947	The Son of Rusty	Lew Landers	Third collaboration with Lew Landers	
1947	The Last Round-Up	John English	First collaboration with John English	
1948	The Sign of the Ram	John Sturges	Second collaboration with John Sturges	
1948	Song of Idaho	Ray Nazarro	Third collaboration with Ray Nazarro	
1948	Jungle Jim	William Berke	First collaboration with William Berke	
1948	Loaded Pistols	John English	Second collaboration with John English	
1949	Riders of the Whistling Pines	John English	Third collaboration with John English	
1949	The Lost Tribe	William Berke	Second collaboration with William Berke	
1949	Rim of the Canyon	John English	Fourth collaboration with John English	
1950	Blondie's Hero	Edward Bernds	First collaboration with Edward Bernds	
1950	The Palomino	Ray Nazarro	Third collaboration with Ray Nazarro	
1950	Beauty on Parade	Lew Landers	Fourth collaboration with Lew Landers	
1950	Customs Agent	Seymour Friedman	First collaboration with Seymour Friedman	
1950	On the Isle of Samoa	William Berke	Third collaboration with William Berke	
1950	Rookie Fireman	Seymour Friedman	Second collaboration with Seymour Friedman	
1950	Chain Gang	Lew Landers	Fifth collaboration with Lew Landers	
1950	The Tougher They Come	Ray Nazarro	Fourth collaboration with Ray Nazarro	
1950	Counterspy Meets Scotland Yard	Seymour Friedman	Third collaboration with Seymour Friedman	
1951	Gasoline Alley	Edward Bernds	Second collaboration with Edward Bernds	
1951	The Big Gusher	Lew Landers	Sixth collaboration with Lew Landers	
1951	Chain of Circumstance	Will Jason		
1951	The Barefoot Mailman	Earl McEvoy		
1952	The Sniper	Edward Dmytryk	First collaboration with Edward Dmytryk	
1952	A Yank in Indo-China	Wallace Grissell		
1952	Brave Warrior	Spencer Gordon Bennet	First collaboration with Spencer Gordon Bennet	
1952	Eight Iron Men	Edward Dmytryk	Second collaboration with Edward Dmytryk	
1953	Jack McCall, Desperado	Sidney Salkow	Third collaboration with Sidney Salkow	
1953	Ambush at Tomahawk Gap	Fred F. Sears	First collaboration with Fred F. Sears	
1953	The Juggler	Edward Dmytryk	Third collaboration with Edward Dmytryk	
1954	Massacre Canyon	Fred F. Sears	Second collaboration with Fred F. Sears	
1954	The Outlaw Stallion	Fred F. Sears	Third collaboration with Fred F. Sears	
1954	The Law vs. Billy the Kid	William Castle	Second collaboration with William Castle	
1954	Human Desire	Fritz Lang		
1954	The Black Dakotas	Ray Nazarro	Fifth collaboration with Ray Nazarro	
1955	Creature with the Atom Brain	Edward L. Cahn		
1955	Devil Goddess	Spencer Gordon Bennet	Second collaboration with Spencer Gordon Bennet	
1955	Hell's Horizon	Tom Gries		
1956	The Bold and the Brave	Lewis R. Foster		
1956	5 Steps to Danger	Henry S. Kesler		
1957	Fear Strikes Out	Robert Mulligan	First collaboration with Robert Mulligan	
1957	Beginning of the End	Bert I. Gordon		
1957	Time Limit	Karl Malden		
1958	Touch of Evil	Orson Welles		
1958	The Proud Rebel	Michael Curtiz		
1958	Tarzan's Fight for Life	H. Bruce Humberstone		
1958	Lonelyhearts	Vincent J. Donehue		
1959	The Giant Gila Monster	Ray Kellogg	First collaboration with Ray Kellogg	
1959	The Killer Shrews	Ray Kellogg	Second collaboration with Ray Kellogg	
1960	My Dog, Buddy	Ray Kellogg	Third collaboration with Ray Kellogg	
1960	Wake Me When It's Over	Mervyn LeRoy		
1961	The Secret Ways	Phil Karlson		
1962	Six Black Horses	Harry Keller		
1962	To Kill a Mockingbird	Robert Mulligan	Second collaboration with Robert Mulligan	
1963	Love with the Proper Stranger	Robert Mulligan	Third collaboration with Robert Mulligan	
1965	Baby the Rain Must Fall	Robert Mulligan	Fourth collaboration with Robert Mulligan	
1965	Inside Daisy Clover	Robert Mulligan	Fifth collaboration with Robert Mulligan	
1966	Not with My Wife, You Don't!	Norman Panama		
1967	Welcome to Hard Times	Burt Kennedy	First collaboration with Burt Kennedy	
1968	The Stalking Moon	Robert Mulligan	Sixth collaboration with Robert Mulligan	
1969	Flareup	James Neilson		
1970	The Grasshopper	Jerry Paris		
1972	Silent Running	Douglas Trumbull		
1972	The Trial of the Catonsville Nine	Gordon Davidson		
1973	Your Three Minutes Are Up	Douglas Schwartz		
1973	Willie Dynamite	Gilbert Moses		
1974	The Take	Robert Hartford-Davis		
1975	Lepke	Menahem Golan		
1975	Cornbread, Earl and Me	Joseph Manduke		
1975	The Four Deuces	William H. Bushnell		
1976	The Killer Inside Me	Burt Kennedy	Second collaboration with Burt Kennedy	
1986	Native Son	Jerrold Freeman		

Director
Year	Film	Notes
1964	The Gallant One	Also writer and producer
2004	Remnants of Auric Healing	

Shorts

Editor
Year	Film	Director
1948	Go Chase Yourself	Jules White
1952	Corny Casanovas	Jules White
1952	He Cooked His Goose	Jules White

TV movies

Editor
Year	Film	Director
1970	But I Don't Want to Get Married!	Jerry Paris
1970	Wild Women	Don Taylor
1970	Crowhaven Farm	Walter Grauman
1972	The Couple Takes a Wife	Jerry Paris
1973	Fade In	Jud Taylor
1975	The Trial of Chaplain Jensen	Robert Day
1975	Shell Game	Glenn Jordan
1976	One of My Wives Is Missing	Glenn Jordan
1977	Night Terror	E. W. Swackhamer
1977	The Amazing Howard Hughes	William A. Graham
1978	Deadman's Curve	Richard Compton
1978	Steel Cowboy	Harvey Laidman
1978	One in a Million: The Ron LeFlore Story	William A. Graham
1979	Can You Hear the Laughter? The Story of Freddie Prinze	Burt Brinckerhoff
1979	Orphan Train	William A. Graham
1980	Guyana Tragedy: The Story of Jim Jones	William A. Graham
1980	Rage!	William A. Graham
1980	My Kidnapper, My Love	Sam Wanamaker
1981	Isabel's Choice	Guy Green
1981	Incident at Crestridge	Jud Taylor
1982	A Question of Honor	Jud Taylor
1982	American Eagle	William A. Graham

TV pilots

Editor
Year	Film	Director
1965	My Island Family	Henry Koster
1977	The Displaced Person	Glenn Jordan

TV series

Editor
Year	Title	Notes
1954	Ford Theatre	4 episodes
1954	Father Knows Best	2 episodes
1954−55	The Adventures of Rin-Tin-Tin	6 episodes
1956	The People's Choice	3 episodes
1956	The Count of Monte Cristo	9 episodes
1957	The New Adventures of Charlie Chan	2 episodes
1959	Death Valley Days	2 episodes
1963	Ben Casey	1 episode
1970	The Most Deadly Game	1 episode
1977	The Amazing Howard Hughes	2 episodes
1977	The Amazing Spider-Man	1 episode
1977	Space Academy	1 episode
1978	The Paper Chase	1 episode
1980	Guyana Tragedy: The Story of Jim Jones	2 episodes
1985	Otherworld	1 episode
