= Abby Berlin =

American film and TV director

- Born: August 7, 1907; New York City, New York, United States
- Died: August 19, 1965 (aged 58); North Hollywood, Los Angeles, California, United States
- Occupation: Director
- Years active: 1928–65
- Spouses: Jean Berlin (19??-November 7, 1939; her death); Iris Meredith

Abby Berlin (August 7, 1907 — August 19, 1965) was best known as a director of feature films and television productions. He began on Broadway and Vaudeville as part of a comedy team with Ken Brown in the 1920s. By 1939, he had moved to Hollywood, where he worked as an assistant director, before getting his opportunity to direct his own films with 1945's Leave It to Blondie. He was married at least twice, his first wife, Jean, committed suicide after arguing with him; his second wife was B-movie actress Iris Meredith.

== Life and career ==
Berlin was born in New York City on August 7, 1907. By the late 1920s, he had teamed up Ken Brown as a comedy song/dance duo, who performed on both Broadway and on the Vaudeville circuit. The team had garnered the nickname the "Two Knights of Knonsense".

In the 1930s, he moved to Hollywood, and was working as an assistant director on films by the end of the decade, many of them in the Blondie franchise. His first film as 1939's Blondie Takes a Vacation. Over the next six years, he would assist on nineteen movies. Outside of the Blondie films, he would work on such notable productions as Go West, Young Lady (1941), City Without Men (1943), Sahara (1943), What a Woman! (1943), The Boy from Stalingrad (1943), The Impatient Years (1944), and A Song to Remember (1945).

In 1945, he was given the opportunity to helm his own picture, Leave It to Blondie. It was the first film after Columbia re-booted the series. He directed a total of twelve feature films, nine of which were in the Blondie franchise. His other features included the romantic comedy, Father Is a Bachelor (1950; co-directed with Norman Foster), which stars William Holden and Coleen Gray; and the 1950 crime drama, Double Deal.

With the advent of television, Berlin moved to the small screen, where he directed on numerous series, including Blondie, Lassie, and The Ann Sothern Show. His direction of William Bendix in transforming the radio program to the small screen, was credited with making The Life of Riley a success.

In 1965, he would return to the big screen one last time, as an assistant director on The Great Sioux Massacre.

== Personal life ==
Berlin was married at least twice. During the 1930s, he married actress Jean Berlin. Just as he was beginning his directing career, in November 1939, the couple had an argument. Afterwards, Jean committed suicide by poisoning herself. Later, in 1943, he married Iris Meredith, when the two eloped to Yuma, Arizona while he was working on Sahara. The two remained married until his death. On August 19, 1965, Berlin died shortly after working on The Great Sioux Massacre, before it opened in September.

== Filmography ==
(Per AFI database)

- Blondie Brings Up Baby (1939) – Assistant director
- Blondie Takes a Vacation (1939) – Assistant director
- The Stranger from Texas (1939) – Assistant director
- So You Won't Talk (1940) – Assistant director
- Blondie Has Servant Trouble (1940) – Assistant director
- Blondie Plays Cupid (1940) – Assistant director
- Blondie Goes Latin (1941) – Assistant director
- Blondie in Society (1941) – Assistant director
- Go West, Young Lady (1941) – Assistant director
- Her First Beau (1941) – Assistant director
- Two Latins from Manhattan (1941) – Assistant director
- Blondie for Victory (1942) – Assistant director
- Blondie Goes to College (1942) – Assistant director
- Blondie's Blessed Event (1942) – Assistant director
- Meet the Stewarts (1942) – Assistant director
- City Without Men (1943) – Assistant director
- Dangerous Blondes (1943) – Assistant director
- Sahara (1943) – Assistant director
- What a Woman! (1943) – Assistant director
- The Boy from Stalingrad (1943) – Assistant director
- The Impatient Years (1944) – Assistant director
- Ever Since Venus (1944) – Assistant director
- Leave It to Blondie (1945) – Director
- A Song to Remember (1945) – Assistant director
- Life with Blondie (1945) – Director
- Blondie Knows Best (1946) – Director
- Blondie's Lucky Day (1946) – Director
- Blondie in the Dough (1947) – Director
- Blondie's Anniversary (1947) – Director
- Blondie's Big Moment (1947) – Director
- Blondie's Holiday (1947) – Director
- Blondie's Reward (1948) – Director
- Mary Ryan, Detective (1950) – Director
- Double Deal (1950) – Director
- Father Is a Bachelor (1950) – Director
- The Great Sioux Massacre (1965) – Assistant director
