= The Big Show-Off =

1945 film by Howard Bretherton

- Directed by: Howard Bretherton
- Screenplay by: László Vadnay; Richard Weil
- Produced by: Claude Spence (associate producer); Sydney M. Williams (producer)
- Starring: See below
- Cinematography: Jack Greenhalgh
- Distributed by: Republic Pictures
- Release date: 22 January 1945
- Running time: 79 minutes
- Country: United States
- Language: English

The Big Show-Off is a 1945 American comedy film directed by Howard Bretherton and distributed by Republic Pictures. It teams Arthur Lake before his return to the Blondie film series and Dale Evans, most frequently seen with her husband Roy Rogers.

== Plot ==
Nightclub pianist Sandy Elliott is madly in love with nightclub singer June Mayfield, who ignores his existence, preferring the obnoxious Wally Porter, the nightclub emcee. Sandy follows June to discover to his disgust that she is a big fan of professional wrestling. Sandy's friend Joe the night club owner decides to make the shy Sandy attractive to June by paying a thug to disrupt June's singing, then being thrown out by Sandy. Joe adds fuel to June's new, smoldering love for Sandy by making her promise not to tell a secret: that Sandy is really the masked wrestler known as "The Devil".

== Cast ==
- Arthur Lake as Sandy Elliott, Shy Pianist
- Dale Evans as June Mayfield, Night Club Singer
- Lionel Stander as Joe Bagley, Club Owner
- George Meeker as Wally Porter, Club MC
- Paul Hurst as The Devil, Masked Wrestling Champion
- Marjorie Manners as Mitzi
- Sammy Stein as Boris the Bulgar, Wrestler
- Louis Adlon as Muckenfuss
- Dan Tobey as Wrestling Announcer
- Douglas Wood as Dr. Dinwiddle
- Emmett Lynn as Hobo
- Sherry Cameron as Dancer, Cameron and Kirby Team
- Klayton Kirby as Dancer, Cameron and Kirby Team
- Anson Weeks as Orchestra Leader

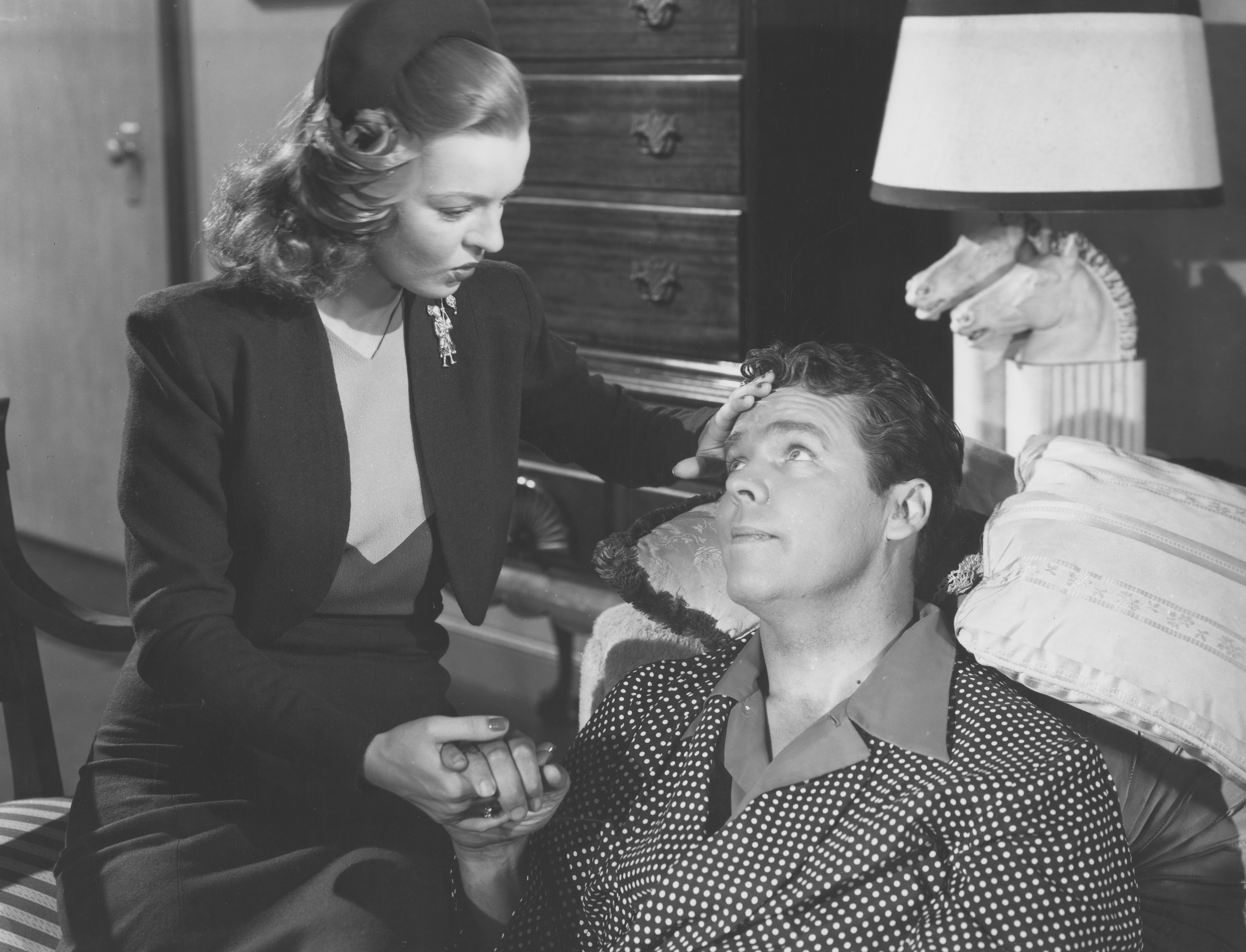
Evans and Lake in the film

== Soundtrack ==
- Dale Evans with the Anson Weeks Orchestra - "There's Only One You" (Written by Dale Evans)
- Dale Evans with the Anson Weeks Orchestra - "Cleo From Rio" (Written by Dave Oppenheim and Roy Ingraham)
- Sherry Cameron and Klayton Kirby with the Anson Weeks Orchestra - "Memories of Old Vienna"
- "Hoops My Dear" (Written by Dave Oppenheim)
