= Marjorie Ann Mutchie =

American actress

- Occupation: Child actor
- Years active: 1943-1950

Marjorie Ann Mutchie (sometimes credited as Marjorie Kent) is a former American child actress who gained fame for playing the role of Cookie Bumstead in the Blondie film series in the 1940s. She retired from show business after the Blondie movies came to an end.

== Selected filmography ==
- It's a Great Life (1943)
- Footlight Glamour (1943)
- Leave It to Blondie (1945)
- Life with Blondie (1945)
- Blondie's Lucky Day (1946)
- Blondie Knows Best (1946)
- Blondie's Big Moment (1947)
- Blondie's Holiday (1947)
- Blondie in the Dough (1947)
- Blondie's Anniversary (1947)
- Blondie's Reward (1948)
- Blondie's Secret (1948)
- Blondie's Big Deal (1949)
- Blondie Hits the Jackpot (1949)
- Blondie's Hero (1950)
- Beware of Blondie (1950)
