= Blondie Hits the Jackpot =

1949 film

- Film poster
- Directed by: Edward Bernds
- Written by: Jack Henley
- Based on: comic strip Blondie by Chic Young
- Produced by: Ted Richmond
- Starring: Penny Singleton; Arthur Lake; Larry Simms; Marjorie Ann Mutchie
- Cinematography: Vincent J. Farrar
- Edited by: Henry Batista
- Production company: King Features Syndicate
- Distributed by: Columbia Pictures
- Release date: September 28, 1949
- Running time: 66 minutes
- Country: United States
- Language: English

Blondie Hits the Jackpot is a 1949 American comedy film directed by Edward Bernds and starring Penny Singleton, Arthur Lake, Larry Simms, and Marjorie Ann Mutchie. It is the 26th of the 28 Blondie films.

== Plot ==
Dagwood is hired on a construction crew raising a new office building. After stumbling through several careless mishaps and pratfalls while handling construction materials, he overhears a foreman order a workman to patch a badly cracked steel girder rather than replace it. Racing to a pay telephone, Dagwood calls Blondie and asks her to contact the property's owner, who unfortunately has an unlisted phone number. The owner is finally located and races to the site in time to fire the foreman and give Dagwood a major promotion.

== Cast ==
- Penny Singleton as Blondie
- Arthur Lake as Dagwood
- Larry Simms as Baby Dumpling
- Marjorie Ann Mutchie as Cookie
- Daisy as Daisy the Dog
- Jerome Cowan as Mr. Radcliffe
- Lloyd Corrigan as J.B. Hutchins
- Ann Carter as Louise Hutchins
- Danny Mummert as Alvin Fuddle
- James Flavin as Brophy
