= Blondie's Hero =

1950 film

- Film poster
- Directed by: Edward Bernds
- Written by: Jack Henley
- Based on: comic strip Blondie by Chic Young
- Produced by: Ted Richmond
- Starring: Penny Singleton; Arthur Lake; Larry Simms; Marjorie Ann Mutchie
- Cinematography: Vincent J. Farrar; Henry Freulich
- Edited by: Richard Fantl
- Music by: Mischa Bakaleinikoff; John Leipold
- Production company: King Features Syndicate
- Distributed by: Columbia Pictures
- Release date: March 9, 1950
- Running time: 67 minutes
- Country: United States
- Language: English

Blondie's Hero is a 1950 American comedy film directed by Edward Bernds and starring Penny Singleton, Arthur Lake, Larry Simms and Marjorie Ann Mutchie. It is the penultimate entry of the series of 28 Blondie films, which ended with Beware of Blondie, released later in 1950.

== Plot summary ==
After Dagwood accidentally enlists in the U.S. Army Reserve, Blondie accompanies him to basic training camp.

== Cast ==
- Penny Singleton as Blondie
- Arthur Lake as Dagwood
- Larry Simms as Baby Dumpling
- Marjorie Ann Mutchie as Cookie
- Daisy as Daisy the Dog
- William Frawley as Marty Greer
- Danny Mummert as Alvin Fuddle
- Joe Sawyer as Sergeant Gateson
- Teddy Infuhr as Danny Gateson
- Alyn Lockwood as Mary Reynolds
- Iris Adrian as Mae
- Frank Jenks as Tim Saunders
