= Blondie's Secret =

1948 film

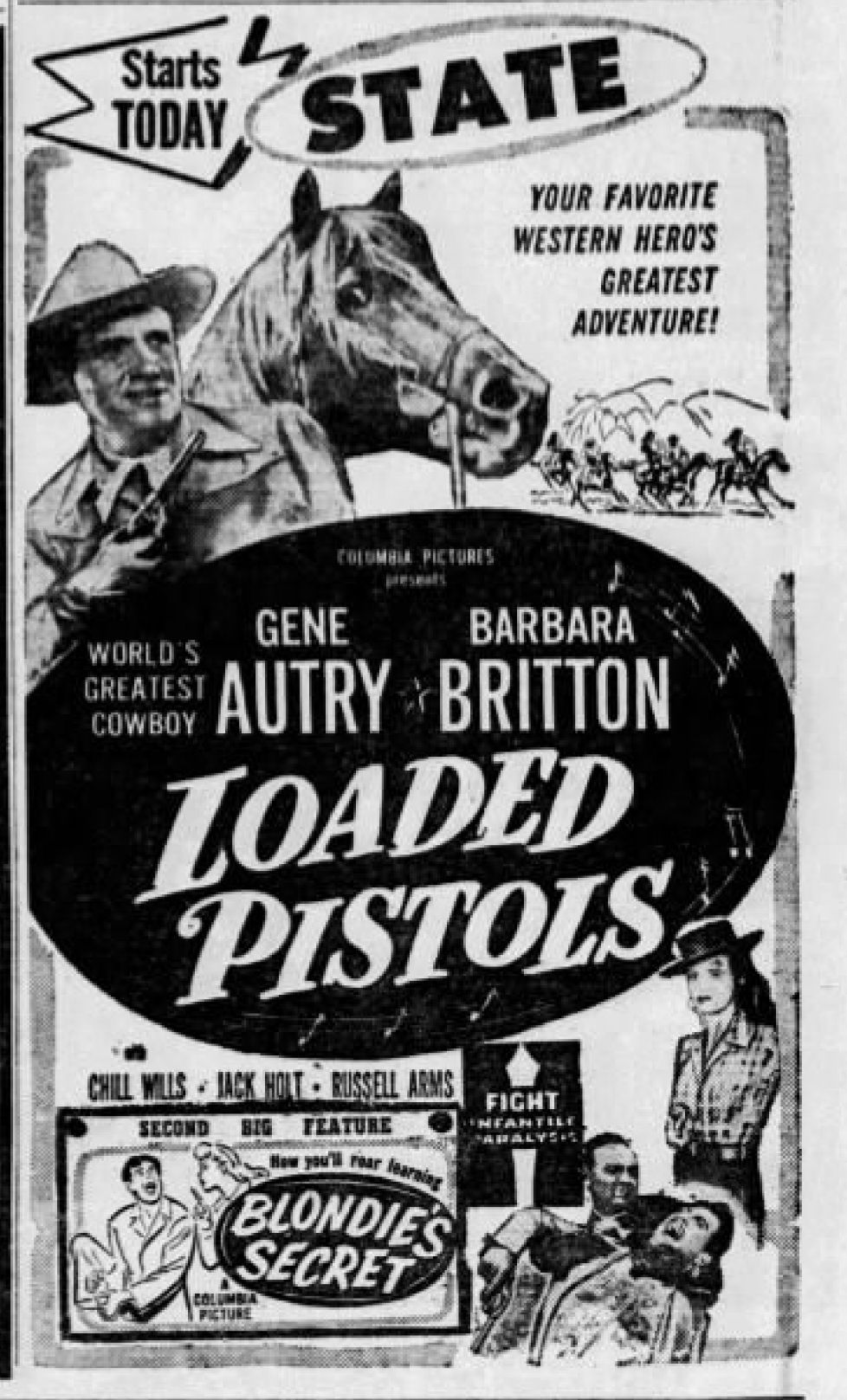
- Blondie's Secret listed as second attraction in newspaper advertisement
- Directed by: Edward Bernds
- Screenplay by: Jack Henley
- Based on: comic strip Blondie by Chic Young
- Produced by: Burt Kelly
- Starring: Penny Singleton; Arthur Lake; Larry Simms; Marjorie Ann Mutchie
- Cinematography: Vincent J. Farrar
- Edited by: Richard Fantl
- Production company: King Features Syndicate
- Distributed by: Columbia Pictures
- Release dates: December 20, 1948 (New York City); December 23, 1948 (United States)
- Running time: 68 minutes
- Country: United States
- Language: English

Blondie's Secret is a 1948 American comedy film directed by Edward Bernds and starring Penny Singleton, Arthur Lake, Larry Simms, and Marjorie Ann Mutchie. It is the twenty-fourth of the 28 Blondie films.

== Plot ==
Dagwood prepares for a long-delayed vacation with the family. His boss Mr. Radcliffe has promised the Bumsteads that there will be no more postponements for their holiday. But when something comes up that requires Dagwood's presence, Radcliffe conspires with another employee to steal Blondie and Dagwood's luggage so that they'll have to stay in town. And that's only the beginning of the frantic fun.

== Cast ==
- Penny Singleton as Blondie
- Arthur Lake as Dagwood
- Larry Simms as Baby Dumpling
- Marjorie Ann Mutchie as Cookie
- Daisy as Daisy the Dog
- Jerome Cowan as Mr. Radcliffe
- Thurston Hall as Mr. Whiteside
- Jack Rice as Ollie Merton
- Danny Mummert as Alvin Fuddle
- Frank Orth as Mr. Philpotts
- Alyn Lockwood as Mary
- Eddie Acuff as Mr. Beasley
