= Larry Simms =

American actor (1934–2009)

- Born: Larry Lee Simms; October 1, 1934; Los Angeles, California, U.S.
- Died: June 17, 2009 (aged 74); Chonburi, Thailand
- Years active: 1937–1951
- Known for: It's a Wonderful Life

Larry Lee Simms (October 1, 1934 – June 17, 2009) was an American aerospace engineer and former child actor who appeared in 36 films between 1937 and 1951. He was best-known for playing Alexander "Baby Dumpling" Bumstead in the Blondie film series.

== Early life ==
Larry Simms was born October 1, 1934, in Santa Monica, California. His mother was Mrs. Margaret Mildred Simms. He worked as a child model from the age of two and was discovered by a Hollywood talent scout when he appeared in a 1937 Saturday Evening Post advertisement.

When Simms was 5 years old a judge rejected his maternal grandmother's request that she receive 10 percent of his salary for serving as his business manager. The judge approved a contract of $200 per week with Columbia Pictures. His ruling allowed $55 per week to be allocated for Simms's maintenance and support and for taxes to be taken out of the salary. The rest was to be divided between his mother and a trust fund.

== Career ==
His first film was The Last Gangster (1937), where he played Edward G. Robinson's young son. Simms became known for his appearances as Alexander "Baby Dumpling" Bumstead in the popular Blondie film series starring Penny Singleton and Arthur Lake. Between 1938 and the end of the series in 1950, Simms appeared as Alexander in 28 films earning at one point $750 a week. In 1946, Simms joined the cast of the Blondie radio program, portraying Alexander there as he had in movies.

Simms occasionally acted outside of the Blondie series, most notably in two Frank Capra films. He played one of the sons of Governor Hopper (Guy Kibbee) in Mr. Smith Goes to Washington (1939) and Pete Bailey, the oldest child of James Stewart's George Bailey in It's a Wonderful Life (1946). He retired from show business to join the Navy (he appeared in uniform as himself in the Columbia Screen Snaphots short Hollywood Grows Up), then studied aeronautical engineering at California Polytech. He later worked at the Jet Propulsion Laboratory (JPL) in Pasadena, California and around the world as an engineer until his retirement from aeronautical engineering.

== Death ==
Simms and his wife resided in Thailand prior to his death (on June 17 at age 74) in 2009.

== Filmography ==
- The Last Gangster (1937) - Joe Krozac Jr. as a Baby (uncredited)
- Blondie (1938) - Baby Dumpling
- Blondie Meets the Boss (1939) - Baby Dumpling
- Blondie Takes a Vacation (1939) - Baby Dumpling Bumstead
- Mr. Smith Goes to Washington (1939) - Hopper Boy #4
- Blondie Brings Up Baby (1939) - Alexander 'Baby Dumpling' Bumstead
- Blondie on a Budget (1940) - Baby Dumpling Bumstead
- Blondie Has Servant Trouble (1940) - Baby Dumpling
- Blondie Plays Cupid (1940) - Baby Dumpling
- Blondie Goes Latin (1941) - Baby Dumpling Bumstead
- Blondie in Society (1941) - Baby Dumpling
- Blondie Goes to College (1942) - Alexander 'Baby Dumpling' Bumstead
- Blondie's Blessed Event (1942) - Baby Dumpling (Alexander) Bumstead
- The Gay Sisters (1942) - Austin
- Blondie for Victory (1942) - Baby Dumpling
- It's a Great Life (1943) - Alexander Bumstead / Baby Dumpling
- Footlight Glamour (1943) - Alexander Bumstead
- Leave It to Blondie (1945) - Alexander Bumstead
- Life with Blondie (1945) - Alexander Bumstead
- Blondie's Lucky Day (1946) - Alexander Bumstead
- Blondie Knows Best (1946) - Alexander Bumstead
- It's a Wonderful Life (1946) - Pete Bailey
- Blondie's Big Moment (1947) - Alexander Bumstead
- Blondie's Holiday (1947) - Alexander Bumstead
- Golden Earrings (1947) - Horace - Pageboy (uncredited)
- Song of Love (1947) - Prince Albert (uncredited)
- Blondie in the Dough (1947) - Alexander Bumstead
- Blondie's Anniversary (1947) - Alexander Bumstead
- Blondie's Reward (1948) - Alexander Bumstead
- Blondie's Secret (1948) - Alexander Bumstead
- Blondie's Big Deal (1949) - Alexander Bumstead
- Madame Bovary (1949) - Justin
- Blondie Hits the Jackpot (1949) - Alexander Bumstead
- Blondie's Hero (1950) - Alexander Bumstead
- Beware of Blondie (1950) - Alexander Bumstead
- Her First Romance (1951) - Military Boy (uncredited) (final film role)
- Screen Snapshots Series 33, Hollywood Grows Up (1954, Documentary short) - Himself

== Bibliography ==
- John Holmstrom, The Moving Picture Boy: An International Encyclopaedia from 1895 to 1995, Norwich, Michael Russell, 1996, p. 190.
