= 16 Fathoms Deep =

1948 American adventure film directed by Irving Allen

Sixteen Fathoms Deep
- Directed by: Irving Allen
- Written by: Max Trell; Forrest Judd; Eustace L. Adams (story)
- Produced by: Irving Allen; James S. Burkett; Arthur Lake
- Starring: Lloyd Bridges; Lon Chaney Jr. Arthur Lake
- Cinematography: Jack Greenhalgh
- Edited by: Charles Craft
- Music by: René Garriguenc; Lucien Moraweck
- Production company: Irving Allen Productions
- Distributed by: Monogram Pictures
- Release date: July 25, 1948
- Running time: 82 minutes
- Country: United States
- Language: English

16 Fathoms Deep (sometimes written as Sixteen Fathoms Deep) is a 1948 American adventure film directed by Irving Allen and starring Lloyd Bridges, Lon Chaney Jr. and Arthur Lake. It is a remake of the 1934 film of the same title in which Chaney had also starred.

== Plot ==
Ray Douglas (Bridges), fresh out of the Navy, arrives in Tarpon Springs, Florida hoping to find work as a sponge diver. Looking for work, he meets Mr. Demitri (Chaney), who runs the sponge auction, but also gives loans to needy fishermen, using the leverage to eventually take their boats. Meanwhile, Pete (Lake) is a photographer taking pictures of the locals for "the big magazines". Demitri's assistant Simi (Tanis Chandler) is in love with diver Alex (Eric Feldary), but Mr. Demitri has designs on her of his own. Despite her warnings, Alex takes a loan from Demitri to buy his own boat, hiring on Ray, as well as the former owner, Capt. Athos (John Qualen) and his son George (Dickie Moore). He also hires Pete as the ship's cook and a diver named Nick (Ian MacDonald), who is working for Demitri to spoil the trip.

== Cast ==
- Lon Chaney Jr. as Mr. Demitri (billed as Lon Chaney)
- Arthur Lake as Pete
- Lloyd Bridges as Ray Douglas
- Eric Feldary as Alex
- Tanis Chandler as Simi
- John Qualen as Capt. Athos
- Ian MacDonald as Nick
- Dickie Moore as George
- Harry Cheshire as Uncle Mike
- John Bleifer as Capt. Briakos

== Production ==
The film was shot on location in Tarpon Springs, Florida. It was to be shot in Ansco Color, a form of color stock. It was intended to film only some footage in Florida and the rest in California but the footage would not match so it had to be shot entirely in Florida.

Acting as co-producer (as well as playing comic relief on-screen), this was Arthur Lake's only foray behind the camera for a feature film.

== Bibliography ==
- Smith, Don G. Lon Chaney, Jr.: Horror Film Star, 1906–1973. McFarland, 2004.
