= Blondie in Society =

1941 film by Frank R. Strayer

- Film poster
- Directed by: Frank R. Strayer
- Screenplay by: Karen DeWolf
- Story by: Eleanore Griffin
- Based on: comic strip Blondie by Chic Young
- Produced by: Robert Sparks
- Starring: Penny Singleton; Arthur Lake; Larry Simms
- Cinematography: Henry Freulich
- Edited by: Charles Nelson
- Music by: M. W. Stoloff
- Production company: King Features Syndicate
- Distributed by: Columbia Pictures
- Release date: June 17, 1941
- Running time: 76 minutes
- Country: United States
- Language: English

Blondie in Society is a 1941 American comedy film directed by Frank R. Strayer and starring Penny Singleton, Arthur Lake, and Larry Simms. It is the ninth of the 28 features in the Blondie film series released by Columbia Pictures.

== Plot ==
Dagwood is given a Great Dane in lieu of repayment for a personal loan he made to an old buddy. The dog, named "Chin-Up," has a voracious appetite, incurs veterinary bills, and roams around stealing food from several neighbors, causing them to sign a petition to evict the Bumsteads. Blondie is sad that she now cannot afford a hair permanent, buy their first washing machine, or their son a bicycle. Different people involved disagree on whether Chin-Up is valuable or worthless. Despite Chin-Up's undisciplined nature, Blondie finally enters him in a major dog contest, where he wins a $500 prize, although there is confusion whether the dog's rightful owner is the Bumsteads, Mr. Dithers, a kennel owner, or a building client (William Frawley) who Chin-Up had been promised to. Blondie along with a boy scout choir at the dog show, sings the inspirational song Trees.

== Cast ==
- Penny Singleton as Blondie
- Arthur Lake as Dagwood
- Larry Simms as Baby Dumpling
- Daisy as Daisy the Dog
- Robert Mitchell Boy Choir as selves
- Jonathan Hale as J.C. Dithers
- Danny Mummert as Alvin Fuddle
- William Frawley as Waldo Pincus
- Edgar Kennedy as Veterinarian Doctor
- Chick Chandler as Cliff Peters
- Irving Bacon as Mailman
- Bill Goodwin as Announcer
