= Blondie's Reward =

1948 film

- Film poster
- Directed by: Abby Berlin
- Written by: Edward Bernds
- Based on: comic strip Blondie by Chic Young
- Produced by: Burt Kelly
- Starring: Penny Singleton; Arthur Lake; Larry Simms; Marjorie Ann Mutchie
- Cinematography: Vincent J. Farrar
- Edited by: Al Clark
- Music by: Mischa Bakaleinikoff
- Production company: King Features Syndicate
- Distributed by: Columbia Pictures
- Release date: June 3, 1948
- Running time: 66 minutes
- Country: United States
- Language: English

Blondie's Reward is a 1948 American comedy film directed by Abby Berlin and starring Penny Singleton, Arthur Lake, Larry Simms, and Marjorie Ann Mutchie. It is the twenty-third of the 28 Blondie films.

== Plot ==
Dagwood purchases the wrong real estate property and Mr. Dithers promptly demotes him to office boy. Dagwood's substitute is sent to deliver blueprints to the estate home of a wealthy client, Mr. Dixon, and gets into a fistfight with Dixon's unwanted son-in-law. The delighted Dixon mistakenly thinks the substitute was Dagwood, and asks Dagwood for a personal boxing lesson, as a pleased Mr. Dithers restores Dagwood to his former position. Meanwhile, two swindlers come to the Bumstead's house to have him sign over a deed to what Dagwood doesn't realize is a valuable property. Alexander and his friend had overheard the swindlers plotting, and they try to interrupt the transaction, but are shooed away and have to take comical measures to stop the signing.

== Cast ==
- Penny Singleton as Blondie
- Arthur Lake as Dagwood
- Larry Simms as Baby Dumpling
- Marjorie Ann Mutchie as Cookie
- Daisy as Daisy the Dog
- Jerome Cowan as Mr. Radcliffe
- Gay Nelson as Alice Dickson
- Ross Ford as Ted Scott
- Danny Mummert as Alvin Fuddle
- Paul Harvey as John D. Dickson
- Frank Jenks as Ed Vance
- Chick Chandler as Bill Cooper
- Jack Rice as Ollie Merton
- Eddie Acuff as Mr. Johnson
- Frank Sully as Officer Carney
- Myron Healey as Cluett Day
- Chester Clute as Leroy J. Blodgett
