= Double Deal (1950 film) =

1950 film directed by Abby Berlin

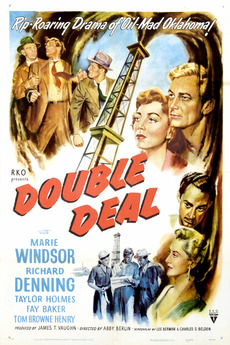
- Poster for the film
- Directed by: Abby Berlin
- Screenplay by: Lee Berman; Charles S. Belden
- Story by: Don McGuire
- Produced by: James T. Vaughn
- Starring: Marie Windsor; Richard Denning; Fay Baker
- Cinematography: Frank Redman
- Edited by: Robert Swink
- Music by: Constantin Bakaleinikoff
- Production companies: Bel-Air Productions; RKO Radio Pictures
- Distributed by: RKO Radio Pictures
- Release date: December 1, 1950 (USA)
- Running time: 65 minutes
- Country: United States
- Language: English

Double Deal is a 1950 American crime drama film directed by Abby Berlin from a screenplay by Lee Berman and Charles S. Belden, based on an original story by Don McGuire. The film stars Marie Windsor and Richard Denning.

== Plot ==
After a dice game one night in the Oklahoma oil town of Richfield, out-of-work engineer Buzz Doyle is broke. Another gambler, Reno Sebastian, has been cleaned out too, but hostess Terry Miller tips them off that her boss Walter Karns, the big winner, was cheating with loaded dice.

Reno has a ranch and an oil well that has not yet produced. He invites Buzz to come work for him, and Terry, who is close to Reno, thinks that it is a good idea because Reno must strike oil within 45 days or the well will belong to his sister Lilli, as stipulated in their father's will.

Lilli has hated Reno ever since he killed her fiancé during a fight while they were gambling. Lilli is ruthlessly determined to obtain all of his holdings. She even tries to seduce Buzz into abandoning Reno and working for her, and when that fails, Lilli threatens that something bad will happen to Buzz if he stands in her way. The corrupt Karns is in love with Lilli and will do her bidding.

Reno is found dead in Buzz's hotel room. Buzz is initially a suspect but is cleared. In his will, Reno left his ranch to Terry, not to his sister. To sort out what is entitled to Reno's survivors, Terry and Buzz seek the advice of Corpus P. Mills, a tipsy attorney who represented Reno's and Lilli's father before he died.

Lilli is found dead directly after a contentious meeting with Terry, who becomes a suspect because she now stands to inherit the ranch and the oil well. Mills convinces the authorities that Terry is not guilty and that, considering the apparent pattern of the murders, she is more likely to be the next victim.

When Terry is escorted home by a police officer, a sober Mills intercepts and kidnaps her. When they arrive at his place, it soon becomes clear that, from the start, Mills has been masterminding a scheme. He had once held leases on all the rich land in the area, and when the leases expired, the land was parcelled to people such as Reno and Lilli.

Mills admits to both killings and reveals to Terry how Reno's will stipulates that if something happens to her, which it will as he completes his plan, the properties return to Mills. Walter Karns has been hiding in the house and now reveals himself to inform Mills that he saw him murder Lilli. Mills shoots Karns, killing him.

Unaware of recent events and believing Terry to still be a suspect in Lilli's murder, Buzz arrives to ask Mills for help. Before letting Buzz in, Mills forces Terry into the basement and covers up the death of Karns. He then convinces Buzz that Terry is not in any trouble and that she is waiting for Buzz back at the hotel.

Thanks to a tip-off from an unlikely source, Buzz discovers Karns' body and Terry. A fight ensues, the police arrive and Mills is brought to justice. Terry and Buzz finally strike oil.

== Cast ==
- Marie Windsor as Terry Miller
- Richard Denning as Buzz Doyle
- Fay Baker as Lilli Sebastian
- Carleton Young as Reno Sebastian
- James Griffith as Walter Karns
- Taylor Holmes as Corpus Mills

The film was Denning's first after finishing the radio show My Favorite Husband, on which he had costarred with Lucille Ball.

This was Windsor's first starring role after ten years of playing bad girls in films.

== Production ==
The film was the first produced by the new company of Bel Air Productions. Filming began in July 1950 at RKO Studios. While completely shot on the RKO lot, the film was not financed by the studio, which only handled distribution.

During production, Denning was injured by a blow to the back, which left him immobile for approximately half a minute. The picture was filmed in a total of nine days, and production was completed by the middle of August.

== Reception ==
Harrison's Reports called Double Deal a "weak melodrama" and felt that the plot was illogical, the acting weak and the direction heavy-handed.

A review in Motion Picture Daily also commented on the script's lack of logic and the quality of the acting, although it praised the performances by Fay Baker and Richard Denning.
