= Blondie in the Dough =

1947 film by Abby Berlin

- Film poster
- Directed by: Abby Berlin
- Screenplay by: Arthur Marx; Jack Henley
- Story by: Arthur Marx
- Based on: comic strip Blondie by Chic Young
- Produced by: Burt Kelly
- Starring: Penny Singleton; Arthur Lake; Larry Simms; Marjorie Ann Mutchie
- Cinematography: Vincent J. Farrar
- Edited by: Henry Batista
- Music by: Mischa Bakaleinikoff
- Production company: King Features Syndicate
- Distributed by: Columbia Pictures
- Release date: October 16, 1947
- Running time: 69 minutes
- Country: United States
- Language: English

Blondie in the Dough is a 1947 American comedy film directed by Abby Berlin and starring Penny Singleton, Arthur Lake, Larry Simms, and Marjorie Ann Mutchie. It is 21st of the 28 Blondie films.

== Plot ==
Dagwood and his boss are frantically searching for an eccentric cookie tycoon in order to sign him to a contract. Unknown to them, Blondie has already met him and the man is enjoying himself making cookies in Blondie's kitchen while Dagwood is at work.

== Cast ==
- Penny Singleton as Blondie
- Arthur Lake as Dagwood
- Larry Simms as Baby Dumpling
- Marjorie Ann Mutchie as Cookie
- Daisy as Daisy the Dog
- Jerome Cowan as George Radcliffe
- Hugh Herbert as Llewellyn Simmons
- Clarence Kolb as J.T. Thorpe
- Danny Mummert as Alvin Fuddle
- William Forrest as Bob Dixon
- Eddie Acuff as Mr. Beasley
- Norman Phillips Jr. as Ollie Shaw
- Kernan Cripps as Harry Baxter
- Fred F. Sears as Quinn
- Alyn Lockwood as Mary
