= Blondie's Big Moment =

1947 film

- Film poster
- Directed by: Abby Berlin
- Written by: Connie Lee
- Based on: comic strip Blondie by Chic Young
- Produced by: Burt Kelly
- Starring: Penny Singleton; Arthur Lake; Larry Simms; Marjorie Ann Mutchie
- Cinematography: Allen G. Siegler
- Edited by: Jerome Thoms
- Music by: Mischa Bakaleinikoff
- Production company: King Features Syndicate
- Distributed by: Columbia Pictures
- Release date: January 9, 1947
- Running time: 69 minutes
- Country: United States
- Language: English

Blondie's Big Moment is a 1947 American comedy film directed by Abby Berlin and starring Penny Singleton, Arthur Lake, Larry Simms, and Marjorie Ann Mutchie. It is the 19th of the 28 Blondie films.

== Plot ==
Dagwood is eager to make a good impression on his new boss Mr.Radcliffe, but he begins the relationship by ruining his boss' new suit with jelly stains. Things do not improve much from then on.

== Cast ==
- Penny Singleton as Blondie
- Arthur Lake as Dagwood
- Larry Simms as Alexander Bumstead (aka Baby Dumpling)
- Marjorie Ann Mutchie as Cookie
- Daisy as Daisy the Dog
- Anita Louise as Miss Gary
- Jerome Cowan as George M. Radcliffe
- Danny Mummert as Alvin Fuddle
- Jack Rice as Ollie Merton
- Jack Davis as Mr. Greenleaf
- Johnny Granath as Slugger
