= Footlight Glamour =

1943 film

- Directed by: Frank R. Strayer
- Written by: Karen DeWolf; Connie Lee
- Based on: comic strip Blondie by Chic Young
- Produced by: Frank R. Strayer
- Starring: Penny Singleton; Arthur Lake; Larry Simms
- Cinematography: Philip Tannura
- Edited by: Richard Fantl
- Music by: John Leipold
- Production company: King Features Syndicate
- Distributed by: Columbia Pictures
- Release date: September 30, 1943
- Running time: 68 minutes
- Country: United States
- Language: English

Footlight Glamour is a 1943 black-and-white film and the 14th of the 28 Blondie films. It is one of only two movies in the series that did not feature "Blondie" in the title (the other, It's a Great Life, was released earlier that year). It was the last film in the "Blondie" series for:

- Frank R. Strayer as producer/director, and
- Irving Bacon as the Bumsteads' hapless mailman, who would be replaced by Eddie Acuff.

== Plot summary ==
Dagwood is hired to work at a new tool manufacturing plant, but things become unusual when Blondie casts the daughter of the rich owner of the plant in a play.

== Cast ==
- Penny Singleton as Blondie
- Arthur Lake as Dagwood
- Larry Simms as Baby Dumpling
- Ann Savage as Vicki Wheeler
- Jonathan Hale as J.C. Dithers
- Irving Bacon as Mr. Crum
- Marjorie Ann Mutchie as Cookie
- Danny Mummert as Alvin Fuddle
- Daisy as Daisy the Dog
- Stanley Brown as Ollie Shaw
