= Beware of Blondie =

1950 film

- Theatrical release poster
- Directed by: Edward Bernds
- Screenplay by: Jack Henley
- Story by: Jack Henley
- Based on: comic strip Blondie by Chic Young
- Produced by: Milton Feldman
- Starring: Penny Singleton; Arthur Lake; Larry Simms; Marjorie Ann Mutchie
- Cinematography: Vincent J. Farrar; Henry Freulich
- Edited by: Richard Fantl
- Music by: Mischa Bakaleinikoff; John Leipold
- Production company: King Features Syndicate
- Distributed by: Columbia Pictures
- Release date: August 10, 1950
- Running time: 64 minutes
- Country: United States
- Language: English

Beware of Blondie is a 1950 American comedy film directed by Edward Bernds, the final installment in Columbia's series of 28 Blondie films over the course of 12 years.

== Plot ==
Mr. Dithers takes a vacation and leaves Dagwood in charge of the office. He arrives exhausted, having worked late on his tax return and being awakened by garbage collectors. Dagwood is recognized the next day taking an attractive female business client to lunch at a French restaurant. Blondie learns of this, is jealous and insists that Dagwood start eating only from a lunchbox. However, remembering Mr. Dithers' insistence that he land the business contract, Dagwood takes the client out a second time and follows her to her apartment afterward, where she tries to seduce him. Blondie finally exposes the woman as a dangerous swindler.

== Cast ==
- Penny Singleton as Blondie
- Arthur Lake as Dagwood
- Larry Simms as Baby Dumpling
- Marjorie Ann Mutchie as Cookie
- Daisy as Daisy the Dog
- Adele Jergens as Toby Clifton
- Dick Wessel as Policeman
- Jack Rice as Ollie Shaw
- Alyn Lockwood as Mary
- Emory Parnell as Herb Woodley
- Isabel Withers as Harriet Woodley
- Danny Mummert as Alvin Fuddle
- Douglas Fowley as Adolph
- William E. Green as Samuel P. Dutton
- Edward Earle as Mr. J.C. Dithers (uncredited)
