= Go West, Young Lady =

1941 film by Frank R. Strayer

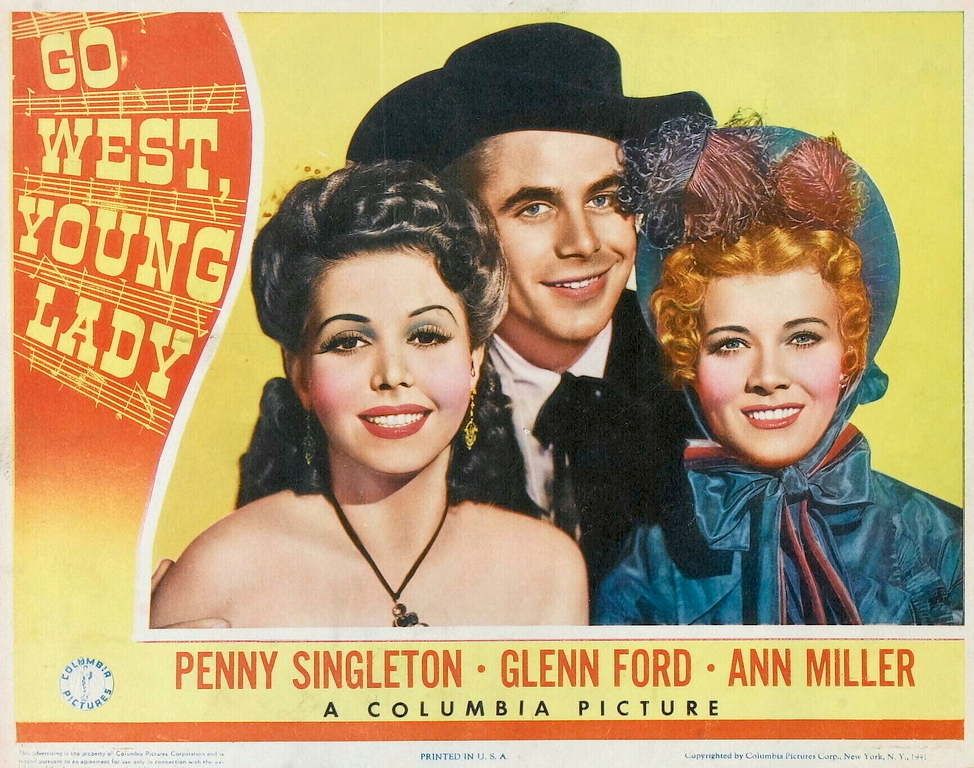
- Theatrical release poster
- Directed by: Frank R. Strayer
- Written by: Karen DeWolf
- Produced by: Robert Sparks
- Starring: Penny Singleton; Glenn Ford; Ann Miller
- Cinematography: Henry Freulich
- Edited by: Gene Havlick
- Production company: Columbia Pictures
- Distributed by: Columbia Pictures
- Release date: November 27, 1941
- Running time: 70 minutes
- Country: United States
- Language: English

Go West, Young Lady is a 1941 American comedy Western film directed by Frank R. Strayer and starring Penny Singleton, Glenn Ford and Ann Miller. It was produced and distributed by Columbia Pictures.

== Plot ==
The town of Headstone eagerly awaits the arrival of their new sheriff, hoping that he will vanquish the dreaded outlaw Killer Pete, who has robbed them repeatedly and murdered the last four sheriffs. Meanwhile, on the stage bound for Headstone, Tex Miller, the new sheriff, is making small talk with fellow passenger and former seminary student Belinda "Bill" Pendergast when the stage is attacked by a band of Indians. Bill shoots them off their horses and then calmly explains to the astonished Tex that her father always wanted a son and taught her to handle a gun.

Back in town, Killer Pete and his gang rob the Crystal Palace saloon. After the outlaws abscond with the money, Judge Harmon hands saloon owner Jim Pendergast a letter from his recently deceased brother Joe, asking Jim to take care of Joe's progeny Bill. Jim insists that Bill be appointed as the new sheriff until the stage arrives and he discovers that Bill is a girl. Bill scandalizes the women of the town when she insists on living above the saloon with her uncle.

Weeks later, Tex visits Bill and asks her to marry him. She sends him to her uncle to ask permission, and in Tex's absence, Killer Pete enters the saloon with guns blazing. Upset that the sound of gunfire has caused a pie baking in her oven to fall, Bill goes downstairs and throws the pie at the outlaw, but misses and hits Tex, who has come running. Blinded by the pie, the sheriff is unable to pursue the bandits, who hijack a carriage that is tied up outside the saloon. Unknown to the outlaws, Judge Harmon and Hank, the deputy, are hiding in the back of the carriage. Later, Killer Pete visits his girlfriend Lola, a singer and dancer at the saloon. The outlaw then removes his disguise and is revealed to be Tom Hannegan, a respected and wealthy rancher.

Lola, jealous of Bill, demands that Jim send his niece back East. After Bill informs Lola that she intends to remain, Lola quits, so Bill decides to take her place onstage. Embarrassed by his niece's unladylike performance, Jim orders her to return East immediately. Jim relents, however, when Tex asks for his niece's hand in marriage. Jim consents to the union and Tex rushes to tell Bill the good news, but is met by another pie in the face when Bill berates the pie for spoiling her engagement and then throws it. That night, Judge Harmon and Hank return from their buggy ride, having captured one of the bandits. After locking him in jail, they meet Hannegan and tell that they have captured bandit Dave Watson, who revealed the location of the gang's hideout. Soon after, Hannegan shoots Dave in his jail cell. He then arranges for Chief Big Thunder Cloud and his tribe to ambush the posse when they ride to the hideout. In the posse's absence, Hannegan and his gang plan to loot the town.

After Tex and the others ride out, Bill begins to pack her suitcase and goes to Lola's dressing room to retrieve her costume. When Bill's dog Waffles uncovers Hannegan's disguise there, Bill tricks Lola into revealing Hannegan's plans. The two women fight and after Bill subdues Lola, the women of the town denounce her for being unfeminine. Bill tells them of the planned robbery and ambush, and recruits Bertha, one of the wives, to warn the posse. When Hannegan and his gang enter the saloon, Bill and the women pelt them with pans and brooms. By the time the posse arrives, the women have captured the outlaws, and Bill accidentally flattens Tex with a frying pan. Tex tells her he will just have to get used to it.

== Cast ==
- Penny Singleton as Belinda 'Bill' Pendergast
- Glenn Ford as Sheriff Tex Miller
- Ann Miller as Lola
- Charles Ruggles as Jim Pendergast
- Allen Jenkins as Deputy Hank
- Onslow Stevens as Tom Hannegan
- Jed Prouty as Judge Harmon
- Edith Meiser as Mrs. Hinkle
- Bob Wills and his Texas Playboys
- Chief Many Treaties as Chief Big Thunder

== Bibliography ==
- Fetrow, Alan G. Feature Films, 1940-1949: a United States Filmography. McFarland, 1994.
- San Antonio Rose: The Life and Music of Bob Wills by Charles Townsend
- The motion picture guide by Jay Robert Nash, Stanley Ralph Ross
