= Leave It to Blondie =

1945 film by Abby Berlin

- Directed by: Abby Berlin
- Written by: Connie Lee
- Based on: comic strip Blondie by Chic Young
- Produced by: Burt Kelly
- Starring: Penny Singleton; Arthur Lake; Larry Simms; Marjorie Ann Mutchie
- Cinematography: Franz Planer
- Edited by: Al Clark
- Production company: King Features Syndicate
- Distributed by: Columbia Pictures
- Release date: February 22, 1945
- Running time: 74 minutes
- Country: United States
- Language: English

Leave It to Blondie is a 1945 American comedy film directed by Abby Berlin and starring Penny Singleton, Arthur Lake and Larry Simms. It was fifteenth of the twenty-eight in the series of Blondie films released by Columbia Pictures.

== Plot summary ==
The Bumsteads have $100 left over from their budget and decide to donate it to charity. Unfortunately, they both unknowingly donate the money, leaving them $100 short.

Alvin decides to help them out by submitting a song written by a relative of Bumstead's to a songwriting contest. Mr. Dithers gets involved when it comes out that the whole thing can help him get a real estate deal.

Meanwhile, Blondie worries about a fortune she overheard involving Dagwood getting involved with some brunette. Dagwood's song is a finalist, and he has to train to sing it on the radio. The woman helping him is a brunette.

== Cast ==
- Penny Singleton as Blondie
- Arthur Lake as Dagwood
- Larry Simms as Baby Dumpling
- Marjorie Ann Mutchie as Cookie
- Daisy as Daisy the Dog
- Marjorie Weaver as Rita Rogers
- Jonathan Hale as J.C. Dithers
- Chick Chandler as Eddie Baxter
- Danny Mummert as Alvin Fuddle
- Maude Eburne as Magda
- Eddie Acuff as Mailman
- Eula Morgan as Laura Meredith
