= Arthur Lake (actor) =

American actor (1905–87)

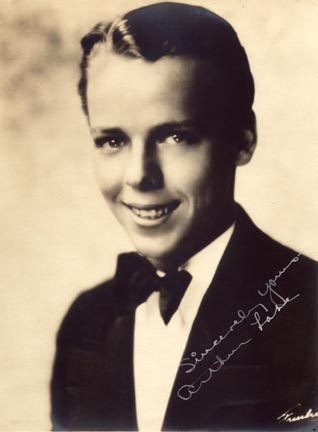
- Lake in 1920s
- Born: Arthur William Silverlake; April 17, 1905; Corbin, Kentucky, U.S.
- Died: January 9, 1987 (aged 81); Indian Wells, California, U.S.
- Resting place: Hollywood Forever Cemetery
- Occupations: Actor, Singer
- Years active: 1917–1957
- Spouse: Patricia Lake (m. 1937)
- Children: Arthur Patrick Lake; Marion Rose Lake
- Relatives: Florence Lake (sister)

Arthur William Lake (né Silverlake, April 17, 1905 – January 9, 1987) was an American actor known best for bringing Dagwood Bumstead, the bumbling husband of Blondie, to life in film, radio, and television.

== Early life and career ==
Arthur William (Silverlake) Lake was born on April 17, 1905, in Corbin, Kentucky, when his father Arthur Adolph Silverlake (né Timberlake) and uncle Archie Glenn Silverlake (né Timberlake) were touring with a circus in an aerial act known as "The Flying Silverlakes". The Silverlake surname was itself a stage name: Lake's father and uncle, born Timberlake, adopted "Silverlake" as a flashier name for their circus aerial act. His mother, Edith Goodwin (née Edith Blanche Fautch) was an actress. His parents later appeared in vaudeville in a skit "Family Affair", traveling throughout the South and Southwest United States. Arthur first appeared on stage as a baby in Uncle Tom's Cabin; his sister Florence and he became part of the act in 1910. Their mother took the children to Hollywood to get into films, and Arthur made his screen debut in the silent Jack and the Beanstalk (1917). Florence became a successful actress achieving a degree of fame as one of the screen wives of comedian Edgar Kennedy.

== As Dagwood in Blondie ==
Arthur Lake is best known for portraying Dagwood Bumstead, the husband of the title character of the Blondie comic strip, in 28 Blondie features produced by Columbia Pictures between 1938 and 1950, co-starring Penny Singleton as Blondie and Larry Simms as Baby Dumpling (later known as Alexander). Lake also played Dagwood on the radio series, which ran concurrently with the film series from 1938 to 1950, earning Lake a star on the Hollywood Walk of Fame at 6646 Hollywood Blvd. (Many of the actors on the radio show noted Lake's commitment to the program, stating that on the day of the broadcast, Lake became Dagwood Bumstead.)

Far from feeling bitter about being typecast, Lake continued to embrace the role. He played Dagwood in a short-lived 1957 Blondie TV series, and often gave speeches to Rotary clubs and other civic organizations (eagerly posing for pictures with a Dagwood sandwich), well into the 1960s and beyond. He died in 1987.

== Other screen work ==
In 1943 Columbia discontinued the Blondie series and dismissed Penny Singleton but retained Arthur Lake—leading men were hard to find during wartime. Lake starred in comedy features for Columbia, Republic Pictures, and United Artists during this hiatus. He also lent his voice to a series of military cartoons produced by Warner Bros. for the U. S. Navy in 1945; Lake played "Mr. Hook," a hapless sailor learning the value of war bonds.

Popular demand caused Columbia to reinstate the Blondie pictures in 1945, reuniting Lake with Singleton until the series finally ended in 1950.

Arthur Lake dabbled in film production in 1948, in partnership with independent filmmaker Irving Allen, who had won the Academy Award for his short subject Climbing the Matterhorn, released by Monogram Pictures. Lake and Allen collaborated on a feature-length undersea adventure, 16 Fathoms Deep, starring Lloyd Bridges and Lon Chaney Jr., and featuring Arthur Lake in a comedy-relief role. Monogram released the film and billed Lake as the star in its advertising. The ambitious "Arthur Lake Production," filmed on location in Tarpon Springs, Florida, was photographed in color and received good reviews and reception, but it was Lake's only venture behind the cameras.

== Filmography ==
Year	Title	Role	Notes
1917	Jack and the Beanstalk		
1922	The Bride's Play	Boy Throwing Roses	
1925	California Straight Ahead	Camper	Uncredited
1925	Sporting Life	Peggy's Admirer in Audience	
1926	Skinner's Dress Suit	Tommy	
1927	Cradle Snatchers	Oscar	
1927	The Irresistible Lover	Jack Kennedy	
1928	The Count of Ten	Betty's Brother	
1928	Stop That Man!	Tommy O'Brien	
1928	Harold Teen	Harold Teen	
1928	Lilac Time	The Unlucky One	
1928	The Air Circus	Speed Doolittle	
1929	On with the Show!	Harold Astor	
1929	Tanned Legs	Bill	
1929	Dance Hall	Tommy Flynn	
1929	Night Owls	Arthur	
1930	Cheer Up and Smile	Eddie Fripp	
1930	She's My Weakness	Tommy Mills	
1931	Indiscreet	Buster Collins	
1933	Midshipman Jack	Allen Williams	
1934	The Winnah!	Arthur	Short
1934	Girl o' My Dreams	Bobby Barnes	
1934	The Silver Streak	Crawford	
1935	Women Must Dress	Janet's Friend	
1935	Orchids to You	Joe	
1936	New Shoes	Boy	Short, Uncredited
1936	I Cover Chinatown	Insurance Salesman	
1937	23 1/2 Hours Leave	Sgt. Turner	
1937	Topper	Elevator boy / bell hop	
1937	Annapolis Salute	Tex Clemens	
1937	Exiled to Shanghai	Bud	
1937	True Confession	Attendant	Uncredited
1938	Everybody's Doing It	Waldo	
1938	Double Danger	Roy West	
1938	There Goes My Heart	Flash Fisher	
1938	Blondie	Dagwood Bumstead	
1939	Blondie Meets the Boss	Dagwood Bumstead	
1939	Blondie Takes a Vacation	Dagwood Bumstead	
1939	Blondie Brings Up Baby	Dagwood Bumstead	
1940	Blondie on a Budget	Dagwood Bumstead	
1940	Blondie Has Servant Trouble	Dagwood Bumstead	
1940	Blondie Plays Cupid	Dagwood Bumstead	
1941	Blondie Goes Latin	Dagwood Bumstead	
1941	Blondie in Society	Dagwood Bumstead	
1942	Blondie Goes to College	Dagwood Bumstead	
1942	Blondie's Blessed Event	Dagwood Bumstead	
1942	Blondie for Victory	Dagwood Bumstead	
1942	Daring Young Man	Dagwood Bumstead	
1943	It's a Great Life	Dagwood Bumstead	
1943	Footlight Glamour	Dagwood Bumstead	
1944	The Ghost That Walks Alone	Eddie Grant	
1944	Sailor's Holiday	'Marblehead' Tomkins	
1944	Three Is a Family	Archie Whittaker	
1945	The Big Show-Off	Sanford 'Sandy' Elliott	
1945	The Return of Mr. Hook	Mr. Hook	uncredited
1945	Tokyo Woes	Mr. Hook	uncredited
1945	The Good Egg	Mr. Hook	uncredited
1945	Leave It to Blondie	Dagwood Bumstead	
1945	Life with Blondie	Dagwood Bumstead	
1946	Blondie's Lucky Day	Dagwood Bumstead	
1946	Blondie Knows Best	Dagwood Bumstead	
1947	Blondie's Big Moment	Dagwood Bumstead	
1947	Blondie's Holiday	Dagwood Bumstead	
1947	Blondie in the Dough	Dagwood Bumstead	
1947	Blondie's Anniversary	Dagwood Bumstead	
1948	Blondie's Reward	Dagwood Bumstead	
1948	Sixteen Fathoms Deep	Pete	
1948	Blondie's Secret	Dagwood Bumstead	
1949	Blondie's Big Deal	Dagwood Bumstead	
1949	Blondie Hits the Jackpot	Dagwood Bumstead	
1950	Blondie's Hero	Dagwood Bumstead	
1950	Beware of Blondie	Dagwood Bumstead	

== Personal life ==
Lake became very friendly with newspaper tycoon William Randolph Hearst and his mistress Marion Davies. He was a frequent guest at the beach house of Davies, where he met Patricia Van Cleeve, Davies's niece. Lake and Van Cleeve married at San Simeon in 1937. They had two children, Arthur Patrick Lake (born March 1, 1943) and Marion Rose Lake (born October 6, 1944). Arthur Patrick Lake died in a car accident in 1994. Their grandson is Arthur David Lake, known in skateboarding as Arthur Lake III, a surfer and mason in Hawaii.

Patricia Lake's parentage was the subject of much gossip and speculation. However, at the time of her death, Patricia Lake reportedly admitted to being the daughter of Davies and Hearst. Arthur Lake was bequeathed half of Marion Davies's $20,000,000 estate when she died in 1961. This fueled the rumors of an arranged marriage between Van Cleeve and him, providing a method of inheritance without acknowledging her parentage.

In his book about the Black Dahlia murder case, author Donald H. Wolfe asserts that Arthur Lake was questioned by the Los Angeles Police Department as a suspect, having been acquainted with the victim through her volunteer work at the Hollywood Canteen. No charges were filed and Lake was one of many persons of interest in a case that remains unsolved.

Lake died of a heart attack in Indian Wells, California, on January 9, 1987. He is interred in the Hollywood Forever Cemetery, in the Douras family mausoleum, along with actress Marion Davies and her husband, Horace G. Brown. Lake's widow Patricia was interred there upon her death in 1993.
