= Blondie's Big Deal =

1949 film

- Film poster
- Directed by: Edward Bernds
- Written by: Lucile Watson Henley
- Based on: comic strip Blondie by Chic Young
- Produced by: Ted Richmond
- Starring: Penny Singleton; Arthur Lake; Larry Simms; Marjorie Ann Mutchie
- Cinematography: Vincent J. Farrar
- Edited by: Henry Batista
- Music by: Mischa Bakaleinikoff
- Production company: King Features Syndicate
- Distributed by: Columbia Pictures
- Release date: March 10, 1949
- Running time: 66 minutes
- Country: United States
- Language: English

Blondie's Big Deal is a 1949 American comedy film directed by Edward Bernds and starring Penny Singleton, Arthur Lake, Larry Simms, Marjorie Ann Mutchie. It is the twenty-fifth of the 28 Blondie films.

== Plot ==
Dagwood accidentally invents a non flammable paint. Con men visit Blondie and, while her back is turned, switch cans of it for ordinary paint, hoping to have the special paint formula analyzed. Dagwood unwittingly paints his boss Mr. Radcliffe's barn with the wrong paint as a test; and with Mr. Radcliffe watching, sets the barn on fire, only to have it burn down, disgracing Dagwood. Blondie then, using an assumed name, is hired as a secretary in the con men's office, where she records their incriminating conversation. As she is about to leave and take back Dagwood's valuable paint, they seize the paint and tie her to a chair as prisoner, but she is soon rescued by a visitor. She rushes to Mr. Radcliffe's office, where the con men are in the process of selling him Dagwood's nonflammable paint, which they claim is their invention. She then plays the incriminating recording, exposing them and having them arrested.

== Cast ==
- Penny Singleton as Blondie
- Arthur Lake as Dagwood
- Larry Simms as Baby Dumpling
- Marjorie Ann Mutchie as Cookie
- Daisy as Daisy the Dog
- Collette Lyons as Norma Addison
- Wilton Graff as Joe Dillon
- Ray Walker as Harry Slack
- Stanley Andrews as Mr. Forsythe
- Mason Alan Dinehart as Rollo
- Eddie Acuff as Mr. Beasley
- Jack Rice as Ollie Merton
- Chester Clute as Ramsey
- George Lloyd as Fire Chief
- Alyn Lockwood as Mary
- Danny Mummert as Alvin Fuddle
