= Blondie Knows Best =

1946 film

- Film poster
- Directed by: Abby Berlin
- Screenplay by: Edward Bernds; Al Martin
- Story by: Edward Bernds
- Based on: comic strip Blondie by Chic Young
- Produced by: Burt Kelly
- Starring: Penny Singleton; Arthur Lake; Larry Simms; Marjorie Ann Mutchie
- Cinematography: Philip Tannura; Charles Lawton Jr.
- Edited by: Aaron Stell
- Music by: Alexander Steinert
- Production company: King Features Syndicate
- Distributed by: Columbia Pictures
- Release date: October 17, 1946
- Running time: 69 minutes
- Country: United States
- Language: English

Blondie Knows Best is a 1946 American comedy film directed by Abby Berlin and starring Penny Singleton, Arthur Lake, Larry Simms, and Marjorie Ann Mutchie. It is the eighteenth of the 28 Blondie films. Songs featured in Gilda, released by Columbia Pictures the same year, are played by the orchestra during a nightclub scene.

== Plot ==
Dagwood is under the threat of a lawsuit by a rival firm. But their choice as a process server is the terminally nearsighted Shemp Howard, who repeatedly fails to serve the summons.

== Cast ==
- Penny Singleton as Blondie
- Arthur Lake as Dagwood
- Larry Simms as Baby Dumpling
- Marjorie Ann Mutchie as Cookie
- Daisy as Daisy the Dog
- Steven Geray as Dr. Schmidt
- Jonathan Hale as J.C. Dithers
- Shemp Howard as Jim Gray
- Jerome Cowan as Charles Peabody
- Danny Mummert as Alvin Fuddle
- Ludwig Donath as Dr. Titus
- Arthur Loft as Mr. Conroy
- Jean Willes as Dr. Titus's Nurse / Receptionist
- Edwin Cooper as David Armstrong
