= Blondie Brings Up Baby =

1939 film by Frank R. Strayer

- Film poster
- Directed by: Frank R. Strayer
- Screenplay by: Gladys Lehman
- Story by: Robert Chapin; Karen DeWolf; Richard Flourney (uncredited)
- Based on: comic strip Blondie by Chic Young
- Produced by: Robert Sparks
- Starring: Penny Singleton; Arthur Lake; Larry Simms
- Cinematography: Henry Freulich
- Edited by: Otto Meyer
- Music by: George Bassman; Leigh Harline; Gregory Stone
- Color process: Black and white
- Production company: King Features Syndicate
- Distributed by: Columbia Pictures
- Release date: November 8, 1939
- Running time: 68 minutes
- Country: United States
- Language: English

Blondie Brings Up Baby is a 1939 American comedy film directed by Frank R. Strayer and starring Penny Singleton, Arthur Lake, Larry Simms. It is the fourth of 28 films based on the comic strip.

== Plot summary ==
Blondie is convinced by a salesman that Baby Dumpling is a genius with an IQ of 168. She enrolls him in kindergarten where he immediately gets into a fight resulting in a black eye. Later, Baby Dumpling skips school to play with Daisy. Blondie and Dagwood report to the police that Baby Dumpling and Daisy are missing. Meanwhile, Daisy is picked up by the dog catcher and taken to the pound where she is adopted by the nurse of a rich little girl who uses a wheelchair. Baby Dumpling spots Daisy inside the gates of the mansion and begins to play with Daisy and the girl. They are spotted. While adults argue about letting the children play together, Baby Dumpling and the little girl wander off with Daisy. The children are found playing on a swing where the little girl demonstrates she has been encouraged to walk. The nurse states, "Weak children can be taught by strong children and strong children learn compassion."

Dagwood shows his architectural model to the girl's father who decides to purchase the building. As a result, Dagwood, who had been fired by Mr. Dithers earlier, is promised a nice bonus.

== Cast ==
- Penny Singleton as Blondie
- Arthur Lake as Dagwood
- Larry Simms as Baby Dumpling
- Daisy, also known as Spooks, as Daisy the Dog
- Danny Mummert as Alvin Fuddle
- Jonathan Hale as J.C. Dithers
- Robert Middlemass as Abner Cartwright
- Olin Howland as Encyclopedia Salesman
- Fay Helm as Mrs. Fuddle
- Peggy Ann Garner as Melinda Mason
- Roy Gordon as Mr. Mason
- Grace Stafford as Miss White
- Helen Jerome Eddy as Miss Ferguson
- Irving Bacon as Mailman
