= Penny Singleton =

American actress (1908–2003)

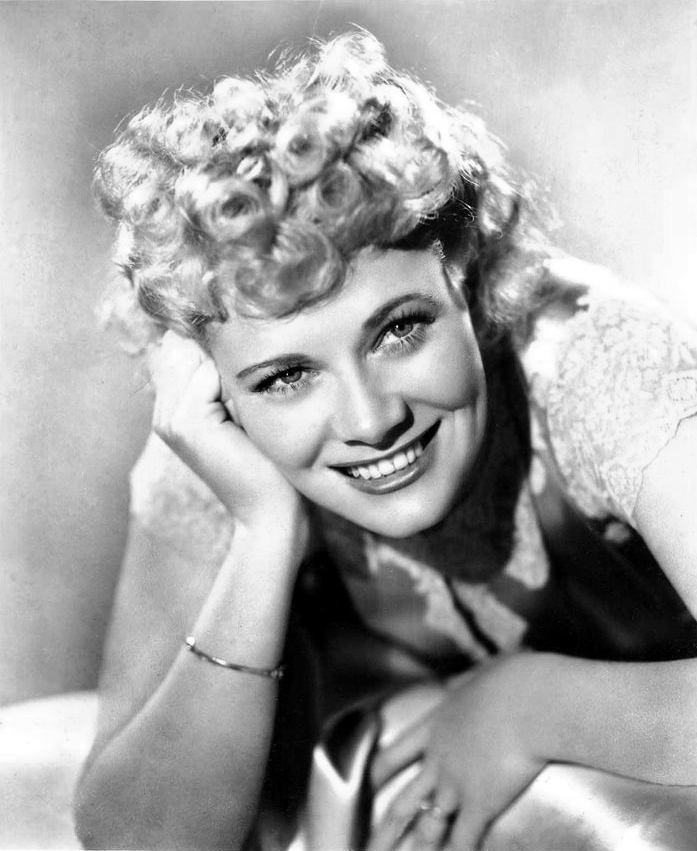
- Singleton in 1938
- Born: Mariana Dorothy McNulty; September 15, 1908; Philadelphia, Pennsylvania, U.S.
- Died: November 12, 2003 (aged 95); Los Angeles, California, U.S.
- Resting place: San Fernando Mission Cemetery
- Occupations: Actress; labor leader
- Years active: 1925–1990
- Political party: Republican
- Spouses: Laurence Scroggs Singleton (m. 1937; div. 1939) Robert Sparks (m. 1941; died 1963)
- Children: 2

Penny Singleton (born Mariana Dorothy McNulty, September 15, 1908 – November 12, 2003) was an American actress and labor leader. During her six decade career on stage, screen, radio and television, Singleton appeared as the comic-strip heroine Blondie Bumstead in a series of 28 motion pictures from 1938 until 1950 and the popular Blondie radio program from 1939 until 1950. Singleton also provided the voice of Jane Jetson in the animated series The Jetsons from 1962 to 1963.

Singleton served two terms as president of the American Guild of Variety Artists (AGVA), becoming the first woman to serve as president of an AFL-CIO union. She testified before a Senate subcommittee in 1962 on the union's treatment of women variety workers, and led a strike of the Radio City Rockettes in 1967.

== Early life ==
Singleton was born in Philadelphia, Pennsylvania. She began performing professionally as a child, and only completed sixth grade in her schooling.

== Career ==
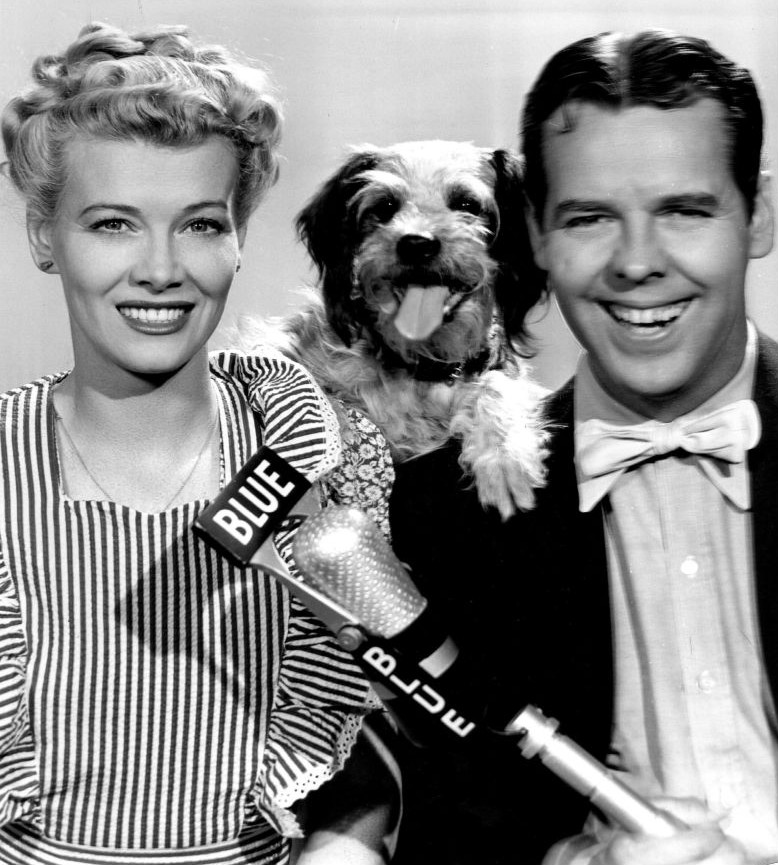
Singleton as Blondie and Arthur Lake as Dagwood Bumstead, from a 1944 publicity photograph

Singleton sang at a silent movie theater, and toured in vaudeville as part of an act called "The Kiddie Kabaret". She sang and danced with Milton Berle, whom she had known since childhood, and actor Gene Raymond, and appeared on Broadway in Jack Benny's The Great Temptations. She also toured nightclubs and in roadshows of plays and musicals.

In 1930, as Dorothy McNulty, she had a featured role as Flo in Good News, performing The Varsity Drag.

Singleton appeared as a brunette nightclub singer in After the Thin Man, credited as Dorothy McNulty. She was cast opposite Arthur Lake (as Dagwood) in the feature film Blondie in 1938, based on the comic strip by Chic Young. They repeated their roles on a radio comedy beginning in 1939 and in guest appearances on other radio shows. As Dagwood and Blondie Bumstead, they proved so popular that a succession of 27 sequels was made from 1938 until 1950, with the radio show ending the same year. Singleton's husband Robert Sparks produced 12 of these sequels. Also in 1950, she had her own program, The Penny Singleton Show, on NBC radio.

Singleton held top billing in Go West, Young Lady (1941), over her male co-star, Glenn Ford. Only two other female stars (Dorothy Page and Jane Frazee) were top-billed singing cowgirls at the time.

One of her last live-action roles was as Jessica Fletcher's Aunt Mildred on the Murder, She Wrote episode "The Perfect Foil" (1986).

She provided the voice of Jane Jetson in the 1962–63 animated series, The Jetsons. From 1985 to 1987, Singleton reprised her role for the new seasons of The Jetsons. She also voiced Jane in The Jetsons Meet the Flintstones (1987), Rockin' with Judy Jetson (1988) and Jetsons: The Movie (1990) before retiring from acting.

== Labor activism ==
Singleton was active in union affairs as a vocal member and president of the American Guild of Variety Artists (AGVA). She was elected head of AGVA in 1958–1959, and again in 1969–1970. Her union membership was suspended in 1962, when she was accused of slandering some of the union's officers, and she countersued. Singleton was reinstated as a union member in 1963, after the dispute reached a legal settlement.

She testified on the exploitation of women in variety work, and the union's shortcomings in representing those workers, before a United States Senate subcommittee in 1962. "I charge here and now that the exotic and strip artists have been abandoned and made outcasts by the very union to which they pay dues for representation and protection," she announced to the subcommittee.

In 1967, she led a successful month-long strike by the Radio City Rockettes for better working conditions. During her presidency, she led negotiations with the Disney on Parade (DOP) show (NAWAL Productions) during a variety artists' strike in the 1970 Disney on Parade show – a joint venture between Walt Disney and NBC, and one of the most successful touring arena shows ever, with tours all over the world. With over 100 cast members, she led a slowdown in the performance in Hershey, Pennsylvania, followed by a walkout in Ft. Wayne, Indiana, and a settlement the next week in Houston, Texas.

The issue was purportedly that the 16" support stage used by the dancers was cut from the show to reduce trucking costs. The stage, which was laid down on the arena floor without the support, caused the dancers to reportedly get shin splints. The strike was settled and the show went on in Houston.

== Personal life ==
Singleton married Laurence Scroggs Singleton, a dentist, in 1937; although they divorced in 1939, she kept his surname. She remarried, to Robert C. Sparks, a Marine Corps officer and film producer, in 1941. They remained wed until his death in 1963. Singleton had two daughters.

Singleton was a charter member of the Hollywood Republican Committee and campaigned for Republicans Thomas E. Dewey in 1948 and Richard Nixon in 1960.

== Death ==
Singleton died on November 12, 2003, at the age of 95 of respiratory failure in Sherman Oaks, California. She was buried at San Fernando Mission Cemetery.

== Legacy ==
For her contributions to both radio and the motion-picture industry, in 1960, Singleton was honored with two stars during her induction to the Hollywood Walk of Fame. Her star for radio is located at 6811 Hollywood Boulevard, and her film star is at 6547 Hollywood Boulevard.

== Filmography ==
=== Features ===
Credited as Dorothy McNulty 1930–1937

- Belle of the Night (1930)
- Good News (1930) – Flo
- Love in the Rough (1930) – Virgie
- Howd' Ya Like That? (1934) – Dancer
- After the Thin Man (1936) – Polly Byrnes
- Vogues of 1938 (1937) – Miss Violet Sims
- Sea Racketeers (1937) – Florence Riley
- Swing Your Lady (1938) – Cookie
- Outside of Paradise (1938) – Colleen Kerrigan
- Men Are Such Fools (1938) – Nancy
- Racket Busters (1938) – Gladys Christie
- Mr. Chump (1938) – Betty Martin
- Boy Meets Girl (1938) – Peggy
- Secrets of an Actress (1938) – Miss Reid
- Garden of the Moon (1938) – Miss Calder
- The Mad Miss Manton (1938) – Frances Glesk
- Hard to Get (1938) – Hattie
- Blondie (1938) – Blondie
- Blondie Meets the Boss (1939) – Blondie
- Blondie Takes a Vacation (1939) – Blondie
- Blondie Brings Up Baby (1939) – Blondie
- Blondie on a Budget (1940) – Blondie
- Blondie Has Servant Trouble (1940) – Blondie
- Blondie Plays Cupid (1940) – Blondie
- Blondie Goes Latin (1941) – Blondie
- Blondie in Society (1941) – Blondie
- Go West, Young Lady (1941) – Belinda Pendergast
- Blondie Goes to College (1942) – Blondie
- Blondie's Blessed Event (1942) – Blondie
- Blondie for Victory (1942) – Blondie
- It's a Great Life (1943) – Blondie
- Footlight Glamour (1943) – Blondie
- Leave It to Blondie (1945) – Blondie
- Life with Blondie (1945) – Blondie
- Young Widow (1946) – Peg Martin
- Blondie's Lucky Day (1946) – Blondie
- Blondie Knows Best (1946) – Blondie
- Blondie's Big Moment (1947) – Blondie
- Blondie's Holiday (1947) – Blondie
- Blondie in the Dough (1947) – Blondie
- Blondie's Anniversary (1947) – Blondie
- Blondie's Reward (1948) – Blondie
- Blondie's Secret (1948) – Blondie
- Blondie's Big Deal (1949) – Blondie
- Blondie Hits the Jackpot (1949) – Blondie
- Blondie's Hero (1950) – Blondie
- Beware of Blondie (1950) – Blondie
- The Best Man (scenes deleted, 1964)
- Jetsons: The Movie (1990) – Jane Jetson (voice) (final film role)

Sourced, to 1964, from TV Guide

=== Short subjects ===
- Belle of the Night (1930)
- Campus Cinderella (1938)
- Screen Snapshots Series 19, No. 1 (1939)

=== Television credits ===
- Pulitzer Prize Playhouse (1950) – Wilhelmina
- Frances Farmer Presents (1958) – Belinda Pendergast
- The Quick Draw McGraw Show (1959) – The Cattle Battle Rattled – Wife
- The Jetsons (1962–1963, 1985–1987) – Jane Jetson (voice)
- Death Valley Days (1963) – Maggie Franklin
- The Twilight Zone (1964) – Sounds and Silences – Mrs. Flemington
- Murder, She Wrote (1986) – "The Perfect Foil" – Aunt Mildred
- Rockin' with Judy Jetson (1988) – Jane Jetson (voice)
- The Jetsons Meet the Flintstones (1987) – Jane Jetson (voice)
- Hanna-Barbera's 50th: A Yabba Dabba Doo Celebration (1989) – Jane Jetson (voice)
- The Funtastic World of Hanna-Barbera (1990) – Jane Jetson (voice)

=== Stage work ===
- Sky High (1925)
- Sweetheart Time (1926)
- The Great Temptations (1926)
- Good News (1928) (replacement for Zelma O'Neal)
- Hey Nonny Nonny! (1932)
- Call Me Madam (1959)
- Never Too Late (1964)
- No, No, Nanette (1971) (replacement for Ruby Keeler)
- No, No, Nanette (1974)
- Little Me (1983)

=== Theme parks ===
- The Funtastic World of Hanna-Barbera (1990) – Jane Jetson (voice)
