= Life with Blondie =

1945 film by Abby Berlin

- Directed by: Abby Berlin
- Screenplay by: Connie Lee
- Based on: comic strip Blondie by Chic Young
- Produced by: Burt Kelly
- Starring: Penny Singleton; Arthur Lake; Larry Simms; Marjorie Ann Mutchie
- Cinematography: L. William O'Connell
- Edited by: Jerome Thoms
- Music by: Mischa Bakaleinikoff
- Production company: King Features Syndicate
- Distributed by: Columbia Pictures
- Release date: December 13, 1945
- Running time: 69 minutes
- Country: United States
- Language: English

Life with Blondie is a 1945 American black-and-white domestic comedy film and the 16th of the 28 Blondie films. It was the return of Dagwood and Blondie after Columbia Picture's 1943 decision to cancel the series met with protest.

== Plot summary ==
A photograph of the Bumstead's dog, Daisy, is unexpectedly chosen by servicemen as their favorite pinup model, instead of a girl's picture. Numerous photographers then clamor to use Daisy on magazine covers and in advertising campaigns. Excited neighbors of the Bumsteads line up to get Daisy's "paw print." Daisy earns more money than Dagwood, and monopolizes most of Blondie's time and attention. Dagwood and the children feel neglected and overlooked. Mr. Dithers is irritated when Dagwood takes short breaks from his work to mind the children while Blondie is gone. At one point, baby Cookie crawls out onto a towering, precarious window ledge at Dagwood's office. Later, Daisy's photographer, after having a male model cancel, asks a reluctant Dagwood to substitute and model bathing suits with a group of flirtatious bathing beauties, which angers Blondie (as well as making Dagwood late returning to his office). Dagwood turns down representatives of a gangster who come to the house wanting to buy Daisy, and then return later to kidnap the dog, making Dagwood fight them.

== Cast ==
- Penny Singleton as Blondie
- Arthur Lake as Dagwood
- Larry Simms as Baby Dumpling
- Marjorie Ann Mutchie as Cookie
- Daisy as Daisy the Dog
- Jonathan Hale as J.C. Dithers
- Ernest Truex as Theodore Glassby
- Marc Lawrence as Pete
- Veda Ann Borg as Hazel
- Ray Walker as Anthony
- Jack Rice as Ollie Shaw
- Lester Dorr as John
