= Blondie's Lucky Day =

1946 film directed by Abby Berlin

- Film poster
- Directed by: Abby Berlin
- Screenplay by: Connie Lee
- Based on: comic strip Blondie by Chic Young
- Produced by: Burt Kelly
- Starring: Penny Singleton; Arthur Lake; Larry Simms; Marjorie Ann Mutchie
- Cinematography: L. William O'Connell
- Edited by: Aaron Stell
- Production company: King Features Syndicate
- Distributed by: Columbia Pictures
- Release date: April 4, 1946
- Running time: 69 minutes
- Country: United States
- Language: English

Blondie's Lucky Day is a 1946 American comedy film directed by Abby Berlin and starring Penny Singleton, Arthur Lake, Larry Simms, Marjorie Ann Mutchie. It is the 17th of the 28 Blondie films.

== Plot summary ==
While his boss, Mr. Dithers, is out of the office, Dagwood takes the initiative to hire a woman architect (a former WAC). Mr. Dithers has a client, a land-developer, who wants to build a theater—and Dagwood's new hire develops a set of design blueprints for the project.

Mr. Dithers returns, and argues with Dagwood, particularly over the hiring of the woman—refusing to even look at her design. Blondie arrives, defends the woman and her husband (Dagwood). She winds up demanding that Mr. Dithers back down, and demands a raise for her husband. In a comically confused exchange between the four, Mr. Dithers winds up firing both Dagwood and the woman architect.

Blondie decides that Dagwood—with the woman architect—will start his own business: "Bumstead Construction." However, they have no clients, and struggle to find any. Dagwood decides to pitch their services to Mr. Dithers' theater-developer—in direct competition with Mr. Dithers. However, Mr. Dithers' is a men's club colleague of the developer, and has an advantage of personal friendship.

Dagwood visits the developer's office, to make his pitch.

However, unbeknownst to Dagwood, the developer has just had a visit from his mooching idle-playboy son, whom the developer scolds and cuts off from the family wealth—terminating his son's line of credit at local clubs and restaurants. While the developer departs into his adjoining "gym", for a massage, the son remains for a while, lounging in his father's office.

At this point Dagwood arrives, and enters the developer's office, and starts talking with the man's son—mistaking him as the developer. The bum son—hungry and broke—lets Dagwood invite him to a business lunch, and leads Dagwood, over several days and evenings, on a series of dining excursions to costly gourmet restaurants and night clubs, at Dagwood's expense. The bum son continues to let Dagwood think he is the developer, so Dagwood continues to indulge him, hoping to win the theater contract.

Blondie and the woman architect join the men for these outings, and the developer's son falls in love with the woman architect (who returns the affection). Eventually, the developer's son develops a conscience, and confesses his deception to all, and helps them scheme a way into seeing the evasive developer.

Results include the developer lulled into nearly hypnotic relaxation by Dagwood, who then puts the woman's blueprints in front of the developer, who notes their excellent quality, before relaxing into unconsciousness by Dagwood's massage. Dagwood accidentally causes the same to two others.

The office secretary arrives in the gym to find Dagwood standing over three seemingly-dead "victims," and calls police. They arrive, and start to attack Dagwood. Blondie arrives with the architect, and intervenes. Mr. Dithers drops by for a visit, and finds the mayhem, and "disloyal" Bumstead, just as the developer regains consciousness.

(Spoiler alert: the next paragraph reveals the ending)

The developer realizes that the "Bumstead Construction" blueprints are superior to those of his buddy, Mr. Dithers—creating a quandary for him: loyalty or quality? Comical quarreling ensues, but ultimately a compromise is reached: Mr. Dithers re-hires Dagwood (and apparently the woman architect), and offers their design services to the developer, and all ends happily (with a raise for Dagwood, at Blondie's insistence).

== Cast ==
- Penny Singleton as Blondie
- Arthur Lake as Dagwood
- Larry Simms as Baby Dumpling
- Marjorie Ann Mutchie as Cookie
- Daisy as Daisy the Dog
- Bob Haymes as Jonathan Butler Jr.
- Angelyn Orr as Sgt. McDermott
- Jonathan Hale as J.C. Dithers
- Frank Jenks as Mailman
- Paul Harvey as Jonathan Butler
- Charles Arnt as Mayor Denby
