= Danny Mummert =

American film and television actor

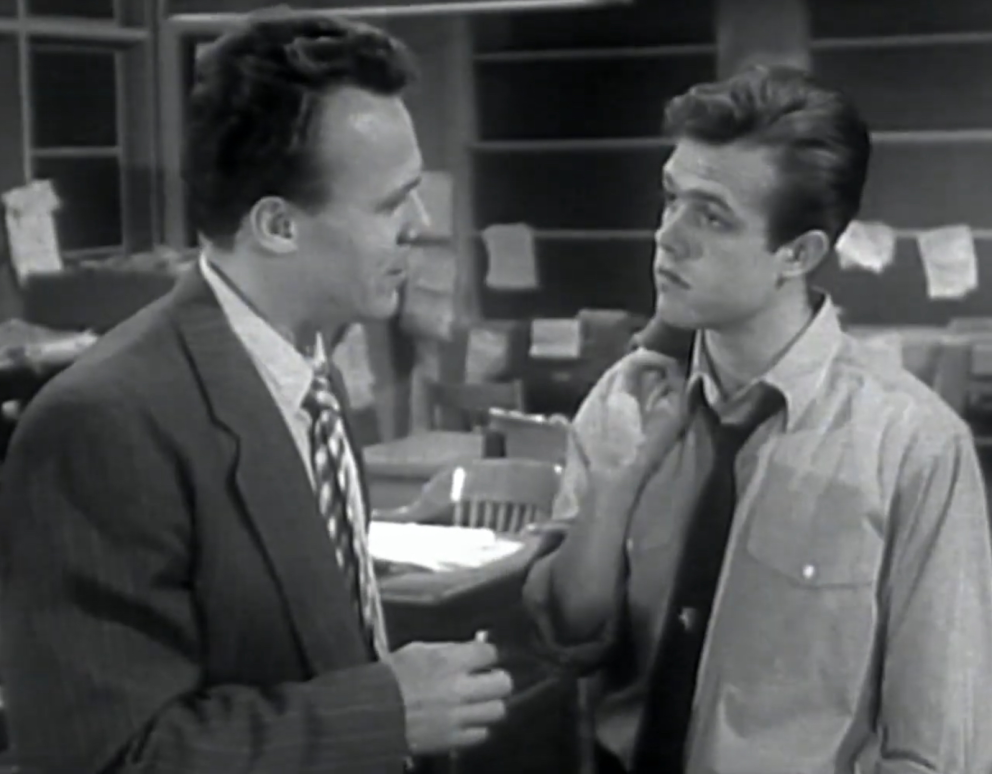
- Mummert (right) with Jay Douglas in Medic, 1955
- Born: Dan Easton Mummert; February 20, 1934; Dallas, Texas, U.S.
- Died: August 10, 1974 (aged 40); Oklahoma, U.S.
- Occupations: Film and television actor

Dan Easton Mummert (February 20, 1934 – August 10, 1974) was an American film and television actor. He was best known for playing Alvin Fuddle in the Blondie film series.

== Life and career ==
Mummert was born in Dallas, Texas, the son of Winifred Mummert. He began his screen career in 1938 after he was signed to a contract by Columbia Pictures, playing Alvin Fuddle in the film Blondie, the first film of the Blondie film series, starring Penny Singleton. He played the same character in more than twenty Blondie films.

Later in his career, Mummert guest-starred in television programs including This Is the Life, Hopalong Cassidy, Peter Gunn, Medic and The Adventures of Wild Bill Hickok. He also appeared in films such as Beautiful but Broke, My Sister Eileen, Meet the Stewarts, Thunder Over the Prairie, It's a Wonderful Life and The Happy Years. During his screen career, he served in the United States Army for two years, under the name Dan Easton.

Mummert retired from acting in 1963, last appearing in the film Island of Love. After retiring from acting, he worked as a photographer, and was a director for television commercials.

== Death ==
Mummert committed suicide on August 10, 1974 in Oklahoma, at the age of 40.
