= Chic Young =

American comic strip cartoonist (1901–1973)

- Chic Young "researching" at the beach in the 1930s with models Jane Lane and Gretchen Davidson
- Born: Murat Bernard Young; January 9, 1901; Chicago, Illinois, U.S.
- Died: March 14, 1973 (aged 72); St. Petersburg, Florida, U.S.
- Occupation: Cartoonist
- Known for: Blondie, Dumb Dora
- Spouse: Athel Lindorff (m. 1927)
- Children: 3, including Dean Young
- Relatives: Lyman Young (brother)

Murat Bernard "Chic" Young (January 9, 1901 – March 14, 1973) was an American cartoonist who created the comic strip Blondie. His 1919 William McKinley High School Yearbook cites his nickname as Chicken, source of his familiar pen name and signature. According to King Features Syndicate, Young had a daily readership of 52 million. Stan Drake, who drew Blondie in the 1980s and 1990s, stated that Young "has to go down in history as one of the geniuses of the industry."

== Comic strips ==
Born in Chicago, Illinois, Young began drawing with the encouragement of his mother, who was an artist. Although his father James was a shoe salesman who didn't think much of artists, all of the children in the family were creative: Walter was a painter, daughter Jamar entered the commercial art field and Lyman, Chic's older brother, drew the Tim Tyler's Luck comic strip for King Features. It was Lyman who spurred Chic to constantly draw.

Chic Young grew up in a German-Lutheran neighborhood on the south side of St. Louis. After graduating from high school in St. Louis, he returned to Chicago where he worked as a stenographer while taking night classes at the Art Institute of Chicago. In 1921, he learned that the Newspaper Enterprise Association was seeking an artist to do a comic strip about an attractive young woman. He headed for Cleveland and earned a weekly salary of $22 (equivalent to $400 in 2025) while drawing The Affairs of Jane about a struggling film actress who dreamed of graduating from low-budget pictures to stardom. The short-lived strip, which began in 1921 on Halloween, came to a conclusion five months later on March 18, 1922. In the NEA art department, Young worked near cartoonist Gene Ahern, and the two often played pranks on each other. When a call came from King Features' J. Gortatowski offering an annual salary of $10,000 (equivalent to $181,000 in 2025), Young thought it was a prank and turned down the job. Looking for work later, he applied to Gortatowski and learned the call was legitimate.

After six months in Cleveland, Young left for New York where he created another female flapper strip, Beautiful Bab, which the Bell Syndicate began distributing on July 15, 1922. It ran for only four months but landed him a job in the art department of King Features Syndicate, mainly as an assistant to cartoonist Jack Callahan, adopting his drawing and storytelling styles. In 1924, he began Dumb Dora, about brunette Dora who "wasn't as dumb as she looked."

In 1927, Young married professional harpist Athel Lindorff (d. 1979). In the spring of 1930, after six years of Dumb Dora's increasing popularity, Young requested more money and strip ownership. This action led to changes, and Paul Fung took over Dumb Dora in April 1930 when Young dropped it to create a new strip.

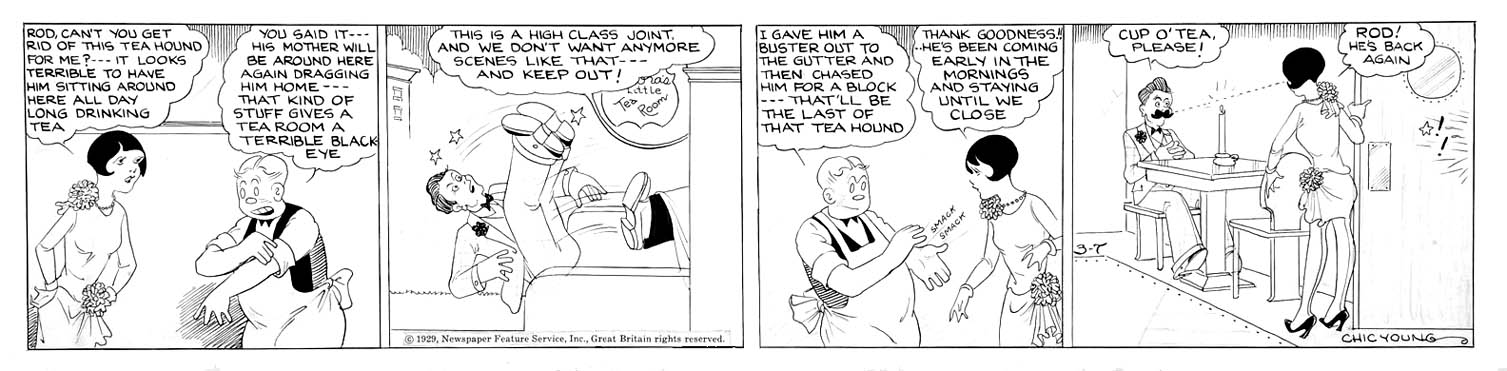
Chic Young's Dumb Dora (March 7, 1929)

== Blondie ==
In the summer of 1930, working in his studio in Great Neck, Long Island, Young created Blondie. When it debuted September 8, 1930, it quickly became the most popular comic strip in America, gaining even more readers when Blondie and Dagwood married in 1933, followed by the 1934 birth of Baby Dumpling (later known as Alexander). When his first son, Wayne, died of diphtheria in 1937, Young took a year's hiatus; the experience made it difficult for him to draw Baby Dumpling. After Young and his wife spent a year traveling in Europe, he began Blondie once again, quelling rumors that he might not return to the strip.

With films, radio, television and products, the strip became a licensing and media bonanza that made Young a wealthy man. During his lifetime, he produced more than 15,000 Blondie strips. Described by former King Features president Joseph Connelly as "the greatest story teller of his kind since the immortal Charles Dickens," Young at his peak received more fan mail than any other cartoonist. His other works include the strip Colonel Potterby and the Duchess, which ran as a topper strip on the Blondie page from 1935 through 1963.

Young worked with several assistants, including Alex Raymond and Ray McGill. Alex Raymond's younger brother, Jim Raymond, who began as Young's assistant in 1935, took over all the art in 1950 when Young's eyesight began to fail.

As of June 2021, Blondie was written by Chic Young's son, Dean Young, and illustrated by John Marshall.

Blondie (October 25, 1951)

== Personal life ==
Living in suburban New Rochelle, New York, Chic and Athel had two other children, Dean Young and Jeanne. In 1939, Young relocated his family to California to be more closely involved with the popular Blondie film series for Columbia Pictures. In the early 1950s, the entire family vacationed in Paris, and a few years later, they moved to Florida, prompting his comment, "We reside on a little island off the west coast of Florida, where the porpoises and pelicans entertain me while I work on the strip. Hobbies? Oh, fishing, golf, very amateurish Oriental cooking and such nonsense."

Young died of a pulmonary embolism on March 14, 1973, at the Apollo Medical Center in St. Petersburg, Florida, at the age of 72. He had been in ill health for some time, remaining near his home in Clearwater Beach, Florida.

== Awards ==
Chic Young received the National Cartoonists Society's Reuben Award for Blondie in 1948, only one of many awards.
