= Irving Bacon =

American actor (1893–1965)

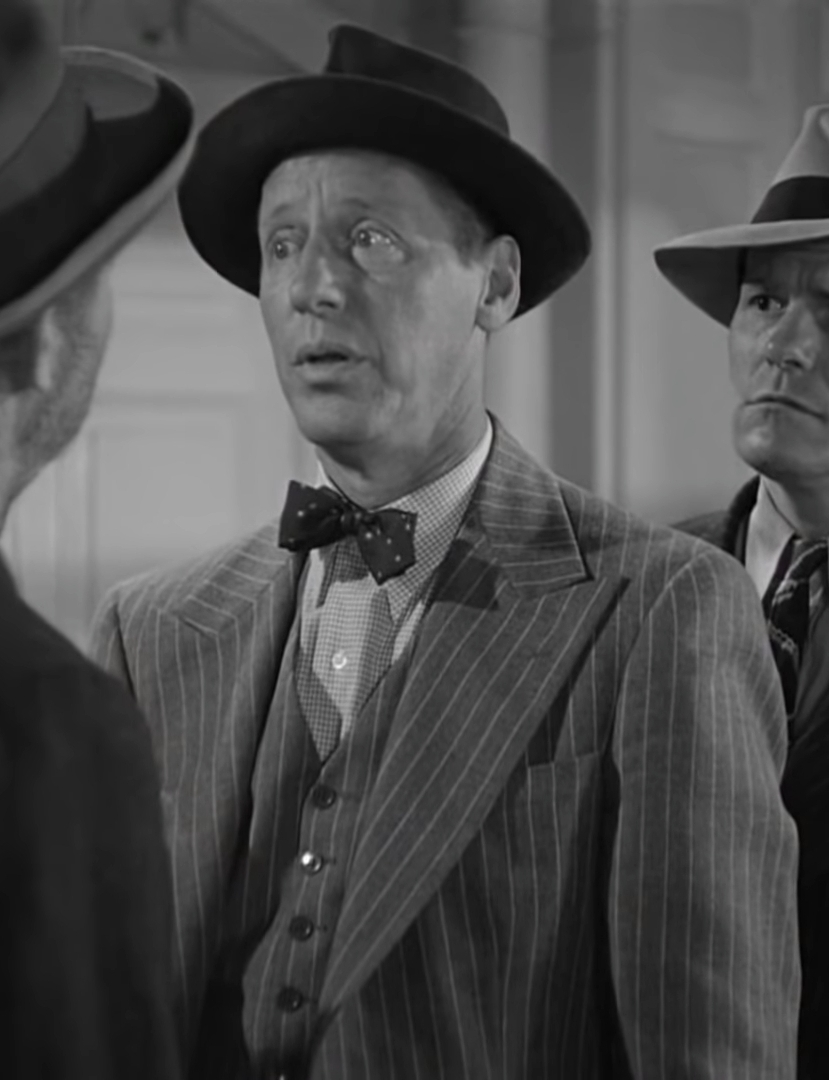
- Bacon in Meet John Doe (1941)
- Born: Irving Ernest Bacon; September 6, 1893; Saint Joseph, Missouri, U.S.
- Died: February 5, 1965 (aged 71); Hollywood, Los Angeles, California, U.S.
- Occupation: Actor
- Years active: 1912–1960
- Spouses: Freda Lee Scofield (m. 1921; died 1928) Margaret (Peggy) Beaver (m. 1930; div. 1934) Alice Bernice Peters (m. 1937)
- Children: 3

Irving Ernest Bacon (September 6, 1893 – February 5, 1965) was an American character actor who appeared in almost 500 films.

== Early years ==
Bacon was the son of entertainers Millar West Bacon (who was a teenager) and Myrtle Vane. He was born in St. Joseph, Missouri, and grew up in San Diego, California. His parents divorced in 1900. His father remarried, to Lena Ann Davis in Spokane later that year.

== Career ==
Bacon played on the stage for a number of years before getting into films in 1912 in Mack Sennett productions. The actor returned to the Sennett studio in 1924, and appeared frequently in Sennett's silent and sound comedies as a supporting actor. By 1933, Bacon was so well established as a utility player that he was pressed into service to replace Andy Clyde—wearing Clyde's "old man" costume and makeup—in a Sennett comedy.

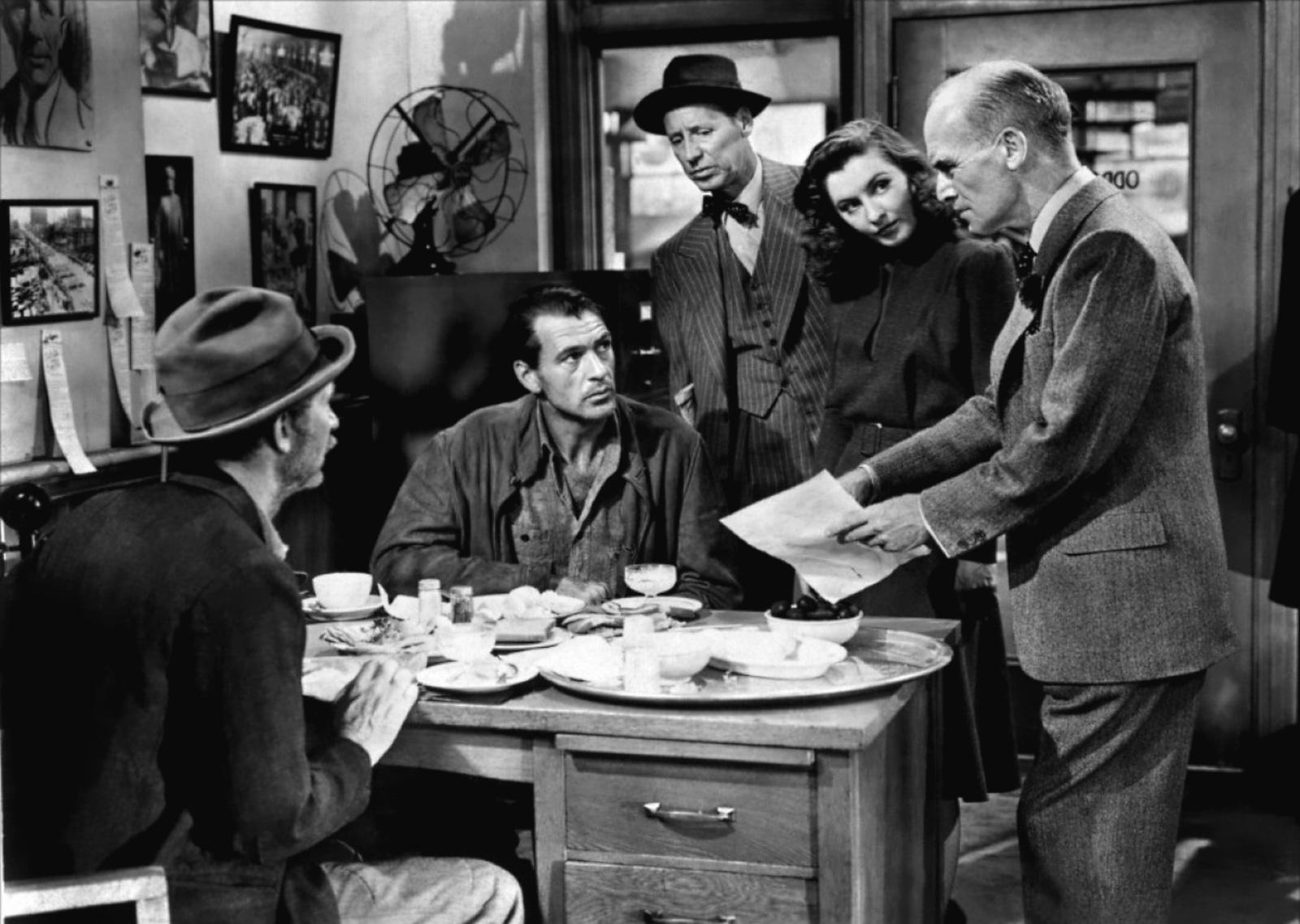
From Meet John Doe (1941), L-R: Walter Brennan, Gary Cooper, Irving Bacon, Barbara Stanwyck and James Gleason

Bacon often played comical "average guys" in scores of feature films; in 1939 alone he appeared in three dozen features. Today's audiences may know him as the soda jerk in the W. C. Fields comedy Never Give a Sucker an Even Break, the wily wagon driver in the Bing Crosby-Fred Astaire musical Holiday Inn, the angry motel guest in the Oscar-winning short Star in the Night, and Glenn Miller's father in The Glenn Miller Story. His most familiar role was as Mr. Beasley, the weary postman in Columbia Pictures' Blondie film series. During the 1950s, Bacon worked steadily in a number of television sitcoms, most notably I Love Lucy, in which he appeared in two episodes, one of which cast him as Ethel Mertz's father.

== Personal life ==
He worked as a Carburetor and Magneto Machinist for the San Diego Battery and Ignition Company according to his 1917 WWI draft Registration Card."

Bacon was married to Freda Lee Scoville until her death in 1928; they had a son and a daughter. In June 1930, Bacon married Margaret Beaver; they had a son, Frank. They were divorced in 1934. In 1937, he wed, lastly, Alice Bernice Peters. He died on February 5, 1965, aged 71, in Hollywood.

== Filmography ==
Film
Year	Title	Role	Notes
1923	Anna Christie	Minor Role	Uncredited
1927	California or Bust	Wade Rexton	
1927	His First Flame	Man Who Jumps Out of Window	Uncredited
1927	The Girl from Everywhere	The Casting Director	
1928	Three Sinners		Uncredited
1928	The Head Man	Mayor	
1928	The Good-Bye Kiss	Col. Von Stein	
1929	Tide of Empire	Townsman	Uncredited
1929	Two Sisters	Chumley	
1929	Side Street	Henchman Slim	Uncredited
1929	The Saturday Night Kid	McGonigle	Uncredited
1929	Half Way to Heaven	Slim	
1930	Burning Up	Yokel Driver	Uncredited
1930	Street of Chance	Harry	
1930	Night Work	Bit	Uncredited
1930	Second Honeymoon	Waiter	Uncredited
1931	Scandal Sheet	Reporter Kent	Uncredited
1931	Fighting Caravans	Mustachioed Barfly	Uncredited
1931	It Pays to Advertise	Photographer	Uncredited
1931	The Vice Squad	Masher	Uncredited
1931	Big Business Girl	Waiter	Uncredited
1931	Alias – the Bad Man	Ranger Repeater	
1931	Bad Girl	Expectant Father	Uncredited
1931	Branded Men	Ramrod	
1931	Her Majesty, Love	Hotel Valet	Uncredited
1931	Ladies of the Big House	Juror	Uncredited
1932	Union Depot	Depot Hotel Waiter	Uncredited
1932	No One Man	Henry - License Clerk	
1932	The Big Timer	Slim Dugan	Uncredited
1932	This Is the Night	Sparks	
1932	The Strange Case of Clara Deane	Rural Service Station Attendant	Uncredited
1932	Week-End Marriage	Grocery Clerk	Uncredited
1932	Million Dollar Legs	Secretary of War	Uncredited
1932	Madame Racketeer	Gus, the Desk Clerk	Uncredited
1932	The Big Broadcast	Prisoner	
1932	They Call It Sin	First Hotel Clerk	Uncredited
1932	I Am a Fugitive from a Chain Gang	Bill - Barber	Uncredited
1932	If I Had a Million	China Shop Salesman	Uncredited
1932	Central Park	Oscar	Uncredited
1932	Lawyer Man	Court Guard	Uncredited
1932	The Match King	Messenger with Bracelet	Uncredited
1933	File 113	Lagors	
1933	Hello, Everybody!	Radio Announcer	Uncredited
1933	He Learned About Women	Stage Door Man	
1933	Sing, Bing, Sing	Helen's father	Short
1933	The Keyhole	Grover - Brooks' Chauffeur	Uncredited
1933	The Mind Reader	Reporter	Uncredited
1933	Central Airport	Amarillo Weatherman	Uncredited
1933	Song of the Eagle	Assistant Burgher / Photographer	Uncredited
1933	Lilly Turner	Earle Yokum	Uncredited
1933	Trouble Busters	Deputy	Uncredited
1933	Private Detective 62	Cab Driver	
1933	I Love That Man	Prison Doctor	Uncredited
1933	Laughing at Life	Construction Engineer Surveyor	Uncredited
1933	Double Harness	Crab Counterman	Uncredited
1933	Lady for a Day	Pool Hall Dupe	Uncredited
1933	Golden Harvest	Rev. Dr. Simmons	Uncredited
1933	Ann Vickers	Waiter	Uncredited
1933	The Bowery	Hick	Uncredited
1933	Tillie and Gus	Nosy Man at Gambling Table	Uncredited
1933	Big Executive	Storekeeper	Uncredited
1933	Female	Gas Station Attendant	Uncredited
1933	Sitting Pretty	Dice Player	Uncredited
1933	Lone Cowboy	Zeke	Uncredited
1933	Shadows of Sing Sing	Highbrow	
1934	Eight Girls in a Boat	Messenger	Uncredited
1934	Miss Fane's Baby Is Stolen	Joel Prentiss	
1934	Massacre	Secretary	Uncredited
1934	Six of a Kind	Hotel Desk Clerk in Philipsburg	Uncredited
1934	It Happened One Night	Gas Station Attendant	Uncredited
1934	George White's Scandals	Hick	Uncredited
1934	House of Mystery	Police Insp. Ned Pickens	
1934	Honor of the Range	Townsman	Uncredited
1934	Merry Wives of Reno	Cook	(scenes deleted)
1934	Now I'll Tell	Gambling House Attendant	Uncredited
1934	Money Means Nothing	Navy Secretary	(scenes deleted)
1934	The Hell Cat	Regan	
1934	Hat, Coat, and Glove	Coat Salesman	Uncredited
1934	Friends of Mr. Sweeney	Hat Attendant	Uncredited
1934	You Belong to Me	Stage Manager	
1934	The Pursuit of Happiness	Bijah	
1934	No Ransom	Heinie	
1934	By Your Leave	Harry	Uncredited
1934	The President Vanishes	Gray Shirt Garage Attendant	Uncredited
1934	Ready for Love	Milkman	Uncredited
1934	Broadway Bill	Hamburger Stand Owner	Uncredited
1934	Babbitt	Harry - Bartender	Uncredited
1934	Little Men	Silas	Uncredited
1934	The Gay Bride	Weight-Guesser	Uncredited
1934	West of the Pecos	Court	
1935	Romance in Manhattan	Counterman	Uncredited
1935	Murder on a Honeymoon	Man With Pelican	Uncredited
1935	Private Worlds	McLean (male nurse)	
1935	I'll Love You Always	Theater Manager	Uncredited
1935	It's a Small World	Cal	
1935	Goin' to Town	Cowboy	Uncredited
1935	Mary Jane's Pa	Clerk Getting Tied Up	Uncredited
1935	The Glass Key	Waiter	Uncredited
1935	Men Without Names	Town Character	Uncredited
1935	Manhattan Moon	Lunch Man	
1935	The Murder Man	Merry-Go-Round Operator	Uncredited
1935	Bright Lights	Postal Worker	Uncredited
1935	The Farmer Takes a Wife	Mr. Vernoy	Uncredited
1935	Welcome Home	Cornelius	Uncredited
1935	Page Miss Glory	Waiter	Uncredited
1935	The Affair of Susan	Cabby	Uncredited
1935	Diamond Jim	Passenger	Uncredited
1935	Redheads on Parade	Entwhistle	Uncredited
1935	Wanderer of the Wasteland	Bartender #1	
1935	Here Comes Cookie	Thompson	
1935	The Virginia Judge	Gus Skinner	
1935	Powdersmoke Range	Gun Store Proprietor	
1935	It's a Great Life	Slim	Uncredited
1935	Two-Fisted	Brick Briggs	
1935	She Couldn't Take It	Man at Toll Gate	Uncredited
1935	Bad Boy	Butcher	Uncredited
1935	Ship Cafe	Slim	
1935	Millions in the Air	Mr. Perkins	
1935	Man of Iron	Jake - a Factory Worker	Uncredited
1935	Hitch Hike Lady	Ed Simpson	
1936	Timothy's Quest	Henry - the Drunken Wagon Driver	Uncredited
1936	Drift Fence	Windy Watkins, Traft Foreman	
1936	The Trail of the Lonesome Pine	Mailman	
1936	The Music Goes 'Round	Stuttering Man	Uncredited
1936	Love on a Bet	Farmer on Hay Wagon	Uncredited
1936	Petticoat Fever	Carl	
1936	The Singing Kid	Maine Driver	Uncredited
1936	Mr. Deeds Goes to Town	Frank	Uncredited
1936	Forgotten Faces	Pretty	
1936	Nobody's Fool	Chauffeur	Uncredited
1936	Three Cheers for Love	Rider - Dance Director	
1936	San Francisco	Picnicker	Uncredited
1936	Rhythm on the Range	Rodeo Announcer	Uncredited
1936	The Bride Walks Out	Hugh's Chauffeur	Uncredited
1936	Earthworm Tractors	Taxicab Driver	
1936	A Son Comes Home	Hamburger Stand Proprietor	Uncredited
1936	To Mary – with Love	Chauffeur	
1936	Pepper	Fireworks Salesman	Uncredited
1936	China Clipper	Charlie - the Janitor	Uncredited
1936	Hollywood Boulevard	Gus - Trocadero Bartender	
1936	The Texas Rangers	David's Father	Uncredited
1936	Lady Be Careful	Happy	
1936	Wives Never Know	Dr. Mumford	Uncredited
1936	Murder with Pictures	Keough	
1936	Valiant Is the Word for Carrie	Drug Store Clerk	
1936	The Big Broadcast of 1937	Property Man	
1936	Hopalong Cassidy Returns	Peg Leg Holden	
1936	The Plainsman	Hysterical Trooper	Uncredited
1936	Arizona Mahoney	Smokey	
1936	Let's Make a Million	Jerry	
1937	Dangerous Number	Detective	Uncredited
1937	Internes Can't Take Money	Jeff	
1937	A Star Is Born	Station Agent	Uncredited
1937	They Gave Him a Gun	Tall Soldier	Uncredited
1937	There Goes My Girl	Policeman Guarding Front Entrance	Uncredited
1937	Angel's Holiday	Fingerprint Expert	Uncredited
1937	The Jones Family in Big Business	Mr. Kinney - Man with Toothache	Uncredited
1937	Sing and Be Happy	Palmer	Uncredited
1937	Marry the Girl	Happy Elmer	
1937	Topper	Hotel Clerk	Uncredited
1937	Exclusive	Dr. Boomgarten	
1937	Walter Wanger's Vogues of 1938	Curson - Accountant	Uncredited
1937	Big City	Jim Sloane	
1937	It's Love I'm After	Elevator Operator	Uncredited
1937	Merry-Go-Round of 1938	Organist	Uncredited
1937	Big Town Girl	Gas Station Attendant	
1937	Every Day's a Holiday	Quartet member	
1937	True Confession	The Coroner	
1938	City Girl	Porter	Uncredited
1938	Midnight Intruder	Evans - The Reitter Chauffeur	
1938	The Big Broadcast of 1938	Prisoner Playing Harmonica	Uncredited
1938	The First Hundred Years	Wilkins	
1938	Mr. Moto's Gamble	Sheriff Tuttle	Uncredited
1938	Tip-Off Girls	Sam	
1938	College Swing	Minor Role	(scenes deleted)
1938	Kentucky Moonshine	Palace Hotel Clerk	
1938	Professor Beware	Painter	Uncredited
1938	Tropic Holiday	Sol Grunnion	Uncredited
1938	Passport Husband	Counterman	Uncredited
1938	Racket Busters	Counter Man	Uncredited
1938	The Amazing Dr. Clitterhouse	Foreman of jury	
1938	The Chaser	Harvey, Streetcar Conductor	
1938	Letter of Introduction	Reporter	Uncredited
1938	The Texans	Pvt. Collins	Uncredited
1938	Sing You Sinners	Lecturer on Seals	
1938	Give Me a Sailor	The Druggist	Uncredited
1938	Spawn of the North	Cannery Official	Uncredited
1938	You Can't Take It with You	Henry - the Head Waiter	Uncredited
1938	The Mad Miss Manton	Mr. Spengler - the Process Server	Uncredited
1938	There Goes My Heart	Mr. Dobbs	
1938	The Sisters	Robert Forbes	
1938	Exposed	Crankpool (process server #2)	
1938	Hard to Get	Gas Station Attendant	Uncredited
1938	The Cowboy and the Lady	Chester - Smith's Secretary	Uncredited
1938	Strange Facees	Meggs	Uncredited
1938	Blondie	Mr. Beazley - the Mailman	Uncredited
1938	Up the River	Phil	Uncredited
1938	Sweethearts	Assistant Director	Uncredited
1939	They Made Me a Criminal	Speed - Gas Station Attendant	Uncredited
1939	The Lone Wolf Spy Hunt	Patrol Sergeant at Italian Restaurant	Uncredited
1939	Boy Slaves	Store Clerk	Uncredited
1939	Made for Each Other	Newark Radio Operator	Uncredited
1939	The Adventures of Huckleberry Finn	Tad	Uncredited
1939	The Arizona Wildcat		
1939	You Can't Cheat an Honest Man	Jailer	Uncredited
1939	Nancy Drew... Reporter	Tracy	Uncredited
1939	Tail Spin	Storekeeper	Uncredited
1939	The Oklahoma Kid	Hotel Clerk	
1939	Blondie Meets the Boss	1st Mailman	Uncredited
1939	The Spirit of Culver	Clerk	Uncredited
1939	Inside Story	Gas Station Attendant	Uncredited
1939	The Lady's from Kentucky	Information Clerk	Uncredited
1939	Big Town Czar	Real Estate Man	Uncredited
1939	Lucky Night	Conductor	
1939	Torchy Runs for Mayor	Hubert Ward	
1939	The Gracie Allen Murder Case	Hotel Clerk	
1939	Bachelor Mother	Clerk at Exchange Window	Uncredited
1939	Second Fiddle	Harvey Vaughan	
1939	News Is Made at Night	Mike - Fingerprint Man	Uncredited
1939	Indianapolis Speedway	Fred Haskill	
1939	Blondie Takes a Vacation	Mailman	
1939	Behind Prison Gates	Convict in Prison Yard	Uncredited
1939	I Stole a Million	Simpson	
1939	Rio	'Mushy'	
1939	On Your Toes	Second Stage Manager	Uncredited
1939	Hollywood Cavalcade	Clerk	
1939	Pack Up Your Troubles	Doughboy	Uncredited
1939	At the Circus	Telegraph Clerk	Uncredited
1939	The Housekeeper's Daughter	Woodbury	Uncredited
1939	Heaven with a Barbed Wire Fence	Sheriff Clem Diggers	
1939	Blondie Brings Up Baby	Mailman	
1939	Too Busy to Work	Gilligan	
1939	Gone With the Wind	Corporal	
1939	Hollywood Slaves		
1940	The Man Who Wouldn't Talk	Paul Gillis	
1940	His Girl Friday	Gus	Uncredited
1940	Brother Rat and a Baby	Hospital Official	Uncredited
1940	The Grapes of Wrath	Driver	
1940	Dr. Ehrlich's Magic Bullet	Becker	
1940	Broadway Melody of 1940	Soda Jerk	Uncredited
1940	Blondie on a Budget	Mailman	
1940	Star Dust	Jefferson Hotel Desk Clerk	
1940	The Doctor Takes a Wife	Sam Appleby - Gas Station Attendant	Uncredited
1940	Edison, the Man	Sheriff	Uncredited
1940	Lillian Russell	Soldier	
1940	On Their Own		
1940	You Can't Fool Your Wife	Lippincott, GBG & P Clerk	
1940	Love, Honor and Oh-Baby!	Cab Driver	
1940	Sailor's Lady	Storekeeper	Uncredited
1940	Manhattan Heartbeat	Sweeney	
1940	Blondie Has Servant Trouble	Mailman	
1940	Gold Rush Maisie	Harry Gilpin	
1940	The Return of Frank James	Bystander	
1940	Young People	Otis	
1940	The Howards of Virginia	Tom Norton	
1940	Dreaming Out Loud	Wes Stillman	
1940	Blondie Plays Cupid	Mailman	
1940	She Couldn't Say No	Abner	
1940	Flight Command	Taxi Driver	(scenes deleted)
1940	Michael Shayne, Private Detective	Fisherman	
1940	Jennie	Real Estate Broker	
1941	Four Mothers	Cigar Store Proprietor	Uncredited
1941	The Wild Man of Borneo	Wagon Driver	Uncredited
1941	Western Union	Barber	
1941	Back Street	Skeet	Uncredited
1941	Tobacco Road	Teller	
1941	Blondie Goes Latin	Mailman	Uncredited
1941	Murder Among Friends	Service Station Attendant	Uncredited
1941	A Girl, a Guy, and a Gob	Mr. Albert Merney	
1941	The Lone Wolf Takes a Chance	Projectionist	Uncredited
1941	Meet John Doe	Beany	
1941	Barnacle Bill	Deck hand	Uncredited
1941	Ride on Vaquero	Jailer Smoky	
1941	Too Many Blondes	Radio Station Manager Twitchell	
1941	Million Dollar Baby	Income Tax Man	Uncredited
1941	Blondie in Society	Mailman	
1941	Caught in the Draft	Cogswell	
1941	Accent on Love	Mr. Smedley	
1941	Our Wife	Doorman	Uncredited
1941	It Started with Eve	Raven	
1941	Never Give a Sucker an Even Break	The Soda Jerk	
1941	Great Guns	Postman	
1941	Henry Aldrich for President	Mr. McCloskey	
1941	Moon Over Her Shoulder	Conrad - Taxi Driver	
1941	They Died with Their Boots On	Uniform Salesman	Uncredited
1941	Look Who's Laughing		(scenes deleted)
1941	Skylark	Ferryman	(scenes deleted)
1941	Cadet Girl	Train conductor	
1941	Remember the Day	Cecil	
1942	Freckles Comes Home	Constable Caleb Weaver	
1942	Young America	Bart Munson	
1942	The Bashful Bachelor	Sheriff / Fire Chief	
1942	Blondie's Blessed Event	Mr. Crumb	
1942	The Great Man's Lady	Parson	Uncredited
1942	The Spoilers	Hotel Manager	Uncredited
1942	Sweetheart of the Fleet	Standish	
1942	Lady in a Jam	Motel Proprietor	Uncredited
1942	Thru Different Eyes	Stu Johnson	
1942	Holiday Inn	Gus	
1942	Footlight Serenade	Stagehand	
1942	Blondie for Victory	Mr. Crumb, Former Mailman	
1942	Pardon My Sarong	Gas Station Proprietor	Uncredited
1942	Give Out, Sisters	Dr. Howard	
1942	Between Us Girls	Soda Clerk	
1942	Get Hep to Love	Mr. Hardwicke	
1942	Daring Young Man	Crumb	Uncredited
1942	Star Spangled Rhythm	New England Farmer - 'Old Glory' Number	Uncredited
1943	Happy Go Lucky	First Reporter	Uncredited
1943	Shadow of a Doubt	Station Master	
1943	The Amazing Mrs. Holliday	Ticket Agent	Uncredited
1943	Two Weeks to Live	Omar Tennyson Gimpel	
1943	Dixie Dugan	Mr. Kelly	
1943	King of the Cowboys	Alf Cluckus	
1943	A Stranger in Town	Orrin Todds	
1943	Follow the Band	Peterson	
1943	Action in the North Atlantic	Bartender	Uncredited
1943	The Desperadoes	Dan Walters	
1943	It's a Great Life	Mailman	
1943	Mister Big	Jimmy, Malt Shop Proprietor	
1943	Hers to Hold	Dr. Bacon	
1943	This Is the Army	Waiter	Uncredited
1943	The Good Fellows	'Gas' Man	Uncredited
1943	So's Your Uncle	Dempster	
1943	Top Man	School Principal	Uncredited
1943	Footlight Glamour	Mr. Crum	
1943	My Kingdom for a Cook	Sheriff	Uncredited
1943	Girl Crazy	John	Uncredited
1943	In Old Oklahoma	Ben	Alternative title: War of the Wildcats
1943	Gung Ho!	Harry the Hamburger Man	Uncredited
1943	A Guy Named Joe	Cpl. Henderson	Uncredited
1943	What a Woman!	Newsman	Alternative title: The Beautiful Cheat
1944	Chip Off the Old Block	Prof. Frost	
1944	Week-End Pass	Sheriff Todd	
1944	Knickerbocker Holiday	Peter Van Stoon	Uncredited
1944	Her Primitive Man	Track Man	
1944	Pin Up Girl	Janitor at Navy Dept.	Uncredited
1944	The Story of Dr. Wassell	Missionary	Uncredited
1944	Song of the Open Road	Man Saying 'Let's Go Pick Oranges'	Uncredited
1944	Since You Went Away	Bartender at Cocktail Lounge	Uncredited
1944	Wing and a Prayer	Sailor Projectionist	Uncredited
1944	Casanova Brown	Hotel Manager	
1944	Heavenly Days	Tower, the Butler	
1944	The Thin Man Goes Home	Tom	
1944	Can't Help Singing	Bath House Barber	Uncredited
1945	Under Western Skies	Sheriff James Whitcolm Wyatt	
1945	Roughly Speaking	Customer in Music Shop	Uncredited
1945	Patrick the Great	Mr. Merney	
1945	Out of This World	Irving Krunk	
1945	Hitchhike to Happiness	Dennis Colby	
1945	Guest Wife	Nosey Stationmaster	
1945	Week-End at the Waldorf	Sam Skelly	
1945	Spellbound	Railway Gateman	Uncredited
1946	One Way to Love	Train Conductor	
1946	Night Train to Memphis	Rainbow	
1946	Wake Up and Dream	Toll Gate Attendant	
1947	My Brother Talks to Horses	Mr. Piper	
1947	Monsieur Verdoux	Pierre Couvais	
1947	Saddle Pals	Thaddeus Bellwether	
1947	Dear Ruth	Delivery Man	
1947	The Bachelor and the Bobby-Soxer	Melvin	Alternative title: Bachelor Knight (UK)
1947	High Wall	Gas Station Owner	Uncredited
1948	Rocky	Bert Hillman	
1948	Albuquerque	Dave Walton	
1948	Adventures in Silverado	Jake Willis	
1948	State of the Union	Buck Swanson	
1948	The Velvet Touch	Albert	
1948	Good Sam	Tramp	
1948	Moonrise	Judd Jenkins	
1948	Family Honeymoon	Mr. Webb	
1948	Words and Music	Hollywood Realtor	Uncredited
1948	Whispering Smith	Telegrapher	Uncredited
1948	California's Golden Beginning		Short
1949	Dynamite	Jake	
1949	John Loves Mary	George Beachwood	Uncredited
1949	The Green Promise	Mr Larkins	
1949	El Paso	Stage Passenger	Uncredited
1949	The Big Cat	Matt Cooper - Mailman	
1949	Manhandled	Sgt. Fayle	
1949	Night Unto Night	Real Estate Agent	(scenes deleted)
1949	It's a Great Feeling	RR Information Clerk	
1949	The House Across the Street	Jury Foreman	Uncredited
1949	Dear Wife	Mike Man	
1949	Sons of New Mexico	Chris Dobbs	
1950	Woman in Hiding	"Pops" Link	
1950	Wabash Avenue	Harlan	Uncredited
1950	Riding High	Hamburger Man	
1950	The Happy Years	Mr. Conover	Uncredited
1950	Never a Dull Moment	Tunk Johnson	Uncredited
1950	Born to Be Bad	Jewelry Salesman	
1950	Emergency Wedding	Filbert - Mechanic	
1950	Mr. Music	Benson, Jewelry Clerk	Uncredited
1951	Cause for Alarm!	Joe Carston	
1951	Katie Did It	Conductor	
1951	Here Comes the Groom	Baines, Butler	
1951	Honeychile	Abner	
1951	Desert of Lost Men	Sheriff Skeeter Davis	
1952	Room for One More	Mayor Michael J. Kane	
1952	Rose of Cimarron	Sheriff	
1952	O. Henry's Full House	Ebenezer Dorset	(segment "The Ransom of Red Chief"), Uncredited
1953	Kansas Pacific	Casey	
1953	Fort Ti	Sgt. Monday Wash	
1953	Sweethearts on Parade	Sheriff Doolittle	
1953	Devil's Canyon	Old Guard	
1954	The Glenn Miller Story	Mr. Miller	
1954	Duffy of San Quentin	Doc Sorin	
1954	Ma and Pa Kettle at Home	John Maddocks	
1954	Black Horse Canyon	Doc	
1954	A Star Is Born	Graves	
1955	Run for Cover	Scotty	
1955	At Gunpoint	Al Ferguson	
1955	Hidden Guns	Doc Carter	
1956	Dakota Incident	Tully Morgan	
1958	Ambush at Cimarron Pass	Judge Stanfield	
1958	Fort Massacre	Charlie	
1958	Fort Apache		
Television
Year	Title	Role	Notes
1951	The Bigelow Theatre		1 episode
1952	I Love Lucy	Mr. Willoughby	1 episode
1953	The Ford Television Theatre		1 episode
1954	Four Star Playhouse	Hamilton Carter	1 episode
1954–1955	My Little Margie	Mr. Townsend - Roberta's father	2 episodes
1955	The George Burns and Gracie Allen Show	Charlie Irwin, Sr.	1 episode
1955	Jane Wyman Presents The Fireside Theatre	Dad	1 episode
1955	I Love Lucy	Will Potter (Ethel's Father)	1 Episode
1956	Cavalcade of America	Patton	1 episode
1956–1957	December Bride	Andyi	2 episodes
1957	The Gale Storm Show	Crackers	1 episode
1958	The Real McCoys	Howard Anderson	1 episode
1958	The Donna Reed Show	Mayor Webster	1 episode
1960	Laramie	Tooey	1 episode
