= Murray Alper =

American actor (1904–1984)

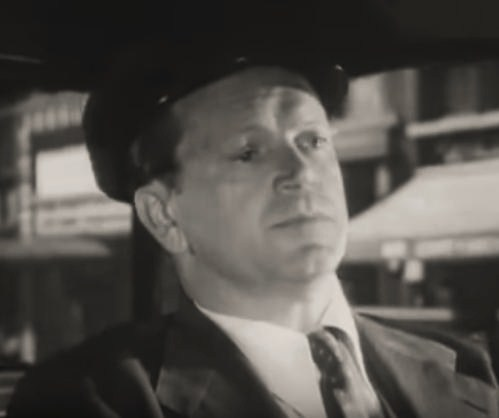
- Alper in Angel on My Shoulder (1946)
- Born: January 11, 1904; New York City, U.S.
- Died: November 16, 1984 (aged 80); Los Angeles, California, U.S.
- Resting place: Hollywood Forever Cemetery
- Occupation: Actor
- Years active: 1927–1969

Murray Alper (January 11, 1904 – November 16, 1984) was an American actor. He appeared in numerous television series, films, and Broadway productions.

== Biography ==
Born in New York City in 1904, Alper worked on Broadway from 1927 to 1940 in a number of shows including The Wild Man of Borneo, This is New York, Broadway Boy, Sailor Beware!, and Every Man for Himself.

Alper appeared in more than 200 films and TV series from the 1930s to the end of the 1960s. Quite often his work was uncredited and he never received a top billing in one of his movies. His first known screen credit was in The Royal Family of Broadway (1930) a part he had already played on Broadway in 1927/28.

His signature character was a chatty taxi driver, which he played at least 20 times, most notably in The Maltese Falcon (1941) as a friendly cabbie who drives Sam Spade, played by Humphrey Bogart, during a mid-film wild goose chase, as well as in such other well-known films as The Big Broadcast of 1937, Lady in the Dark and Angel on My Shoulder. His biggest role should have been the part of Gus Smith in the Alfred Hitchcock film Lifeboat in 1943. Due to his becoming ill right before the start of shooting in August, he was replaced by actor William Bendix. However, he worked for Hitchcock on three other movies: Mr. & Mrs. Smith (1941), again as a cabbie, Saboteur (1942), and Strangers on a Train (1951).

Frequently seen in comedies, Alper was featured in the Three Stooges films Tricky Dicks (1953) and The Outlaws Is Coming (1965). One of Alper's least characteristic roles was the judo instructor in Jerry Lewis' The Nutty Professor (1963).

== Selected filmography ==
- The Royal Family of Broadway (1930) - McDermott
- The Girl Habit (1931) - Hood
- Little Big Shot (1935) - Doré's Henchman #22
- Navy Wife (1935) - Sam (uncredited)
- The Public Menace (1935) - Stiglitz
- Hands Across the Table (1935) - Cabbie (uncredited)
- Seven Keys to Baldpate (1935) - Max the Monk
- The Milky Way (1935) - Cabbie with Little Agnes (uncredited)
- Two in Revolt (1936) - Andy
- Panic on the Air (1936) - Martin Danker
- Murder on a Bridle Path (1936) - Taxi Driver (uncredited)
- High Tension (1936) - Chuck
- Lady Be Careful (1936) - Mattie
- The Big Broadcast of 1937 (1936) - Taxi Driver (uncredited)
- Winterset (1936) - Louie (uncredited)
- After the Thin Man (1936) - The Kid (uncredited)
- Sea Devils (1937) - Seaman Brown
- When's Your Birthday? (1937) - Dustin's Trainer (uncredited)
- 23 1/2 Hours Leave (1937) - Sergeant Schultz
- You Can't Buy Luck (1937) - Chauffeur Spike Connors
- Riding on Air (1937) - Gunner in Mob Plane (uncredited)
- The Singing Marine (1937) - Marine (uncredited)
- Escape by Night (1937) - Horace 'Red' Graham
- That's My Story (1937) - Blackie
- Big Town Girl (1937) - Marty
- Change of Heart (1938) - Plumber (uncredited)
- Island in the Sky (1938) - Blackie - Doyle's Henchman (uncredited)
- Cocoanut Grove (1938) - Concessionaire (uncredited)
- Gold Diggers in Paris (1938) - Taxi Driver (uncredited)
- Passport Husband (1938) - Baggage Man (uncredited)
- Keep Smiling (1938) - Projectionist 'Shorty' (uncredited)
- The Arkansas Traveler (1938) - Hobo, Frogeyes
- Young Dr. Kildare (1938) - Blue Swan Waiter (uncredited)
- Submarine Patrol (1938) - Orderly in Maitland's Office (uncredited)
- The Cowboy and the Lady (1938) - Cowboy at Ranch (uncredited)
- Next Time I Marry (1938) - Joe
- Road Demon (1938) - Hap Flynn
- King of the Underworld (1939) - Eddie
- The Great Man Votes (1939) - Tri-County Distribution Truck Driver (uncredited)
- Tail Spin (1939) - Albuquerque Mechanic (uncredited)
- Twelve Crowded Hours (1939) - Louie Allen
- Rose of Washington Square (1939) - Eddie, Candy Butcher (uncredited)
- It's a Wonderful World (1939) - Newspaper Man at Ferry Landing (uncredited)
- Bachelor Mother (1939) - Dance Floor Gatekeeper at 'The Pink Slipper' (uncredited)
- Stop, Look and Love (1939) - Pete (uncredited)
- The Roaring Twenties (1939) - Fletcher's Mechanic (uncredited)
- Another Thin Man (1939) - Larry, a Father (uncredited)
- The Night of Nights (1939) - Muggins
- The Big Guy (1939) - Williams
- The Lone Wolf Strikes (1940) - Pete (uncredited)
- Black Friday (1940) - Bellhop
- Double Alibi (1940) - Joe, Counterman (uncredited)
- I Can't Give You Anything But Love, Baby (1940) - Nails
- My Favorite Wife (1940) - Yosemite Bartender (uncredited)
- Turnabout (1940) - Masseur
- Gambling on the High Seas (1940) - Louie
- Sailor's Lady (1940) - Sailor (uncredited)
- Manhattan Heartbeat (1940) - Mechanic
- Blondie Has Servant Trouble (1940) - Taxi Driver (uncredited)
- Lucky Partners (1940) - Orchestra Leader (uncredited)
- The Bride Wore Crutches (1940) - Izzy (uncredited)
- City for Conquest (1940) - Taxi Driver (uncredited)
- East of the River (1940) - Dink Rogers, Blackjack Player (uncredited)
- Street of Memories (1940) - Taxicab Driver (uncredited)
- Mr. & Mrs. Smith (1941) - Harold, Taxi Driver (uncredited)
- Affectionately Yours (1941) - Blair
- Out of the Fog (1941) - Drug Store Soda Jerk (uncredited)
- Caught in the Draft (1941) - Make-Up Man (uncredited)
- Sergeant York (1941) - But! Boy (uncredited)
- Bullets for O'Hara (1941) - Singing Messenger (uncredited)
- My Life with Caroline (1941) - Jenkins
- Manpower (1941) - Lineman (uncredited)
- Navy Blues (1941) - Sailor in Storeroom (uncredited)
- The Maltese Falcon (1941) - Frank Richman, taxi driver
- Down Mexico Way (1941) - Flood
- Married Bachelor (1941) - Sleeper
- Dangerously They Live (1941) - Miller, Psychopathic Ward Guard (uncredited)
- You're in the Army Now (1941) - Supply Man: Hats (uncredited)
- Call Out the Marines (1942) - Military Policeman (uncredited)
- Obliging Young Lady (1942) - Pickup Driver with Red (uncredited)
- The Lady Is Willing (1942) - Joe Quig
- Saboteur (1942) - Truck Driver
- My Favorite Spy (1942) - Kay's 1st Taxi Driver (uncredited)
- Yankee Doodle Dandy (1942) - Wise Guy (uncredited)
- Powder Town (1942) - Joe, Cab Driver (uncredited)
- The Big Shot (1942) - Quinto, a Convict
- Escape from Crime (1942) - Fingerprint Man's Assistant (uncredited)
- The Gay Sisters (1942) - Elevator Operator (uncredited)
- Mug Town (1942) - Shorty
- No Time for Love (1943) - Moran (uncredited)
- Lady Bodyguard (1943) - Attendant (uncredited)
- The Hard Way (1943) - Joe Duglatz (uncredited)
- Air Force (1943) - Butch, Demolition Squad Corporal (uncredited)
- Good Morning, Judge (1943) - Charlie Martin (uncredited)
- Bombardier (1943) - Little Boy, Spy (uncredited)
- Hers to Hold (1943) - Smiley, the Foreman
- This Is the Army (1943) - Soldier (uncredited)
- The Good Fellows (1943) - Cummings (uncredited)
- Larceny with Music (1943) - Cab Driver
- Corvette K-225 (1943) - Jones
- Swing Fever (1943) - Burly Attentant (uncredited)
- Lady in the Dark (1944) - Taxicab Driver (uncredited)
- Once Upon a Time (1944) - Soldier Leaving Theatre (uncredited)
- The Eve of St. Mark (1944) - Sergeant Kriven
- Roger Touhy, Gangster (1944) - Ralph Burke (uncredited)
- Wing and a Prayer (1944) - Benjamin K. 'Benny 'O'Neill
- Moonlight and Cactus (1944) - Slugger
- Something for the Boys (1944) - Army Desk Sergeant (uncredited)
- Army Wives (1944) - Mike
- God Is My Co-Pilot (1945) - Sergeant Altonen (uncredited)
- The Power of the Whistler (1945) - Joe Blainey, Elite Bakery Truck Driver (uncredited)
- The Horn Blows at Midnight (1945) - Tony, the Hotel Bell Captain (uncredited)
- Honeymoon Ahead (1945) - Spike
- They Were Expendable (1945) - 'Slug' Mahan T.M. 1c
- Up Goes Maisie (1946) - Mitch O'Hara
- The Phantom Thief (1946) - Eddie Alexander, Chauffeur
- Angel on My Shoulder (1946) - Jim, Taxicab Driver (uncredited)
- Gallant Bess (1946) - Johnny
- The Long Night (1947) - Mac, Bartender (uncredited)
- The Gangster (1947) - Eddie (uncredited)
- Slippy McGee (1948) - Red
- Sleep, My Love (1948) - Drunk (uncredited)
- The Return of October (1948) - Little Max (uncredited)
- Let's Live a Little (1948) - 2nd Cabbie (uncredited)
- Blondie's Secret (1948) - Larry
- Force of Evil (1948) - Comptroller (uncredited)
- Take Me Out to the Ball Game (1949) - Zalinka (uncredited)
- Any Number Can Play (1949) - Taxi Driver (uncredited)
- Abbott and Costello Meet the Killer, Boris Karloff (1949) - Joe, Reporter (uncredited)
- Free for All (1949) - McGuinness
- On the Town (1949) - Cab Company Owner (uncredited)
- Blonde Dynamite (1950) - John Zero 'Dynamite' Bacchuss
- Appointment with Danger (1950) - Goddard's Taxi Driver (uncredited)
- Kill the Umpire (1950) - Fireman (uncredited)
- The Gunfighter (1950) - Townsman at Funeral (uncredited)
- David Harding, Counterspy (1950) - Customer (uncredited)
- Gasoline Alley (1951) - Giffin, Salesman / Con Man (uncredited)
- Navy Bound (1951) - Seaman 'Warthog' Novak
- Lullaby of Broadway (1951) - Joe the Bartender (uncredited)
- Fighting Coast Guard (1951) - Medic / Interne (uncredited)
- Strangers on a Train (1951) - Boatman (uncredited)
- Let's Go Navy! (1951) - Sailor with Nuramo tattoo
- Lost Continent (1951) - Air Police Sergeant
- The Steel Fist (1952) - Nicholas
- Here Come the Marines (1952) - Corporal Stacy
- Because You're Mine (1952) - Supply Sergeant (uncredited)
- Army Bound (1952) - Military Police Sergeant
- No Holds Barred (1952) - Barney
- The Jazz Singer (1952) - Taxi Driver (uncredited)
- Jalopy (1953) - Red Baker
- Trouble Along the Way (1953) - Bus Driver (uncredited)
- Murder Without Tears (1953) - Jim, the Bartender
- Arena (1953) - Medic (uncredited)
- Vice Squad (1953) - Cop (uncredited)
- Devil's Canyon (1953) - Driver-Guard (uncredited)
- Three Sailors and a Girl (1953) - Marine (uncredited)
- Highway Dragnet (1954) - Ice Cream Truck Driver
- Tanganyika (1954) - Paul Duffy (uncredited)
- Security Risk (1954) - Mike
- Jungle Gents (1954) - Fats Lomax (uncredited)
- Alfred Hitchcock Presents (1955) (Season 1 Episode 7: "Breakdown") - Lloyd
- Women's Prison (1955) - Mae's Boyfriend (uncredited)
- The Big Tip Off (1955) - Dan Curry, Gambler
- Las Vegas Shakedown (1955) - House Manager
- Jail Busters (1955) - Gus
- The McConnell Story (1955) - Sergeant (uncredited)
- Slightly Scarlet (1956) - Hood (uncredited)
- Chain of Evidence (1957) - Charlie (uncredited)
- Hold That Hypnotist (1957) - Gale
- Calypso Joe (1957) - Transfer Man
- Baby Face Nelson (1957) - Alex, Bank Guard
- The Geisha Boy (1958) - GI in Korea (uncredited)
- The Young Philadelphians (1959) - Diner Counterman (uncredited)
- Say One for Me (1959) - Otto (uncredited)
- Alfred Hitchcock Presents (1960) (Season 5 Episode 19: "Not the Running Type") - Sergeant Ed Carmody
- The Leech Woman (1960) - Drunk (uncredited)
- Ocean's 11 (1960) - Deputy (uncredited)
- The Ladies Man (1961) - Butcher (scenes deleted)
- Walk on the Wild Side (1962) - Diner in Teresina's Cafe (uncredited)
- What Ever Happened to Baby Jane? (1962) - Projectionist (uncredited)
- It's Only Money (1962) - 2nd Cop on Pier (uncredited)
- Papa's Delicate Condition (1963) - Gambler (uncredited)
- The Nutty Professor (1963) - Gym Attendant (uncredited)
- The Three Stooges Go Around the World in a Daze (1963) - Gus
- The Patsy (1964) - Bowler (uncredited)
- The Disorderly Orderly (1964) - Patient (uncredited)
- The Munsters (1964) - "Tin-Can man"
- The Alfred Hitchcock Hour (1965) (Season 3 Episode 18: "The Trap") - Cabbie
- The Outlaws Is Coming (1965) - Chief Crazy Horse
- The Adventures of Bullwhip Griffin (1967) - Police Officer (uncredited)
- The Big Mouth (1967) - Ed, Motorcycle Officer (uncredited)
- Where Were You When the Lights Went Out? (1968) - Passenger (uncredited)
- Hook, Line & Sinker (1969) - Member, Board of Inquiry (uncredited) (final film role)
