= Blondie Meets the Boss =

1939 film by Frank R. Strayer

- Directed by: Frank R. Strayer
- Written by: Richard Flournoy (screenplay); Kay Van Riper
- Based on: comic strip Blondie by Chic Young
- Produced by: Robert Sparks
- Starring: Penny Singleton; Arthur Lake
- Cinematography: Henry Freulich
- Edited by: Gene Havlick
- Music by: Leigh Harline
- Production company: King Features Syndicate
- Distributed by: Columbia Pictures
- Release date: March 9, 1939 (US)
- Running time: 75 minutes
- Country: United States
- Language: English

Blondie Meets the Boss is a 1939 American comedy film directed by Frank R. Strayer and starring Penny Singleton and Arthur Lake. Based on the Chic Young comic strip of the same name, the film is the second in the Blondie series, which eventually grew to 28 films.

== Plot ==
A frustrated Dagwood resigns his office job, but Blondie is fortunately able to take over his position. Dagwood leaves their toddler unattended at home to go on a short fishing trip with a friend at a cabin, and is uneasy and skittish when he finds his friend has brought along two attractive young women. Adding to the chaos, after Dagwood returns home, Blondie's sister and her boyfriend come to stay with them in order to enter a jitterbug championship at the nightclub Mr. Dithers needs for a building project. Dagwood, on short notice, substitutes in the dance contest after his sister-in-law's boyfriend backs out, and performs amazing acrobatic dance steps. A jealous Blondie, seeing pictures of the fishing trip, packs her bags with the intention of leaving Dagwood, but changes her mind. In the confusion, they neglect to buy Mr. Dithers the nightclub, which actually turns out to be fortuitous.

== Cast ==
- Penny Singleton as Blondie Bumstead
- Arthur Lake as Dagwood Bumstead
- Larry Simms as Baby Dumpling Bumstead
- Jonathan Hale as J.C Dithers
- Danny Mummert as Alvin
- Daisy as Daisy the Dog
- Dorothy Moore as Dot Miller
- Don Beddoe as Marvin Williams
- Dorothy Comingore as Francine Rogers
- Stanley Brown as Ollie Shaw
- Joel Dean as Freddie Turner
- Richard Fiske as Nelson
- Inez Courtney as Betty Lou Wood
- Patti Lacey as featured swing dancer
- Ray Hirsch as featured swing dancer
- Skinnay Ennis as himself
- Barbara Kent as Jitterbugger (*UK actress born 1921, not silent star Barbara Kent)
- Eddie Acuff as Pots and Pans Peddler
- Irving Bacon as 1st Letter Carrier
- George Chandler as Laundry Worker
- Wallis Clark as Henry W. Philpot
- William B. Davidson as Older Man in Café
- Edgar Dearing as Officer McGuire
- Jay Eaton as Wilson
- Walter Soderling as Morgan
- Sarah Edwards as Salesperson
- Edward Gargan as Garden Café Doorperson
- David Newell as Sanders
- Walter Sande as 2nd Letter Carrier
- Grady Sutton as Camera Store Clerk

== Production ==
Production for the film took place in December 1938 to January 1939, and had the working title Blondie Steps Out.
