= Blondie Plays Cupid =

1940 film by Frank R. Strayer

- Directed by: Frank R. Strayer
- Written by: Charles M. Brown; Karen DeWolf
- Based on: comic strip Blondie by Chic Young
- Produced by: Robert Sparks
- Starring: Penny Singleton; Arthur Lake
- Cinematography: Henry Freulich
- Edited by: Gene Milford
- Music by: Leigh Harline; M. W. Stoloff
- Production company: Columbia Pictures
- Distributed by: Columbia Pictures
- Release date: October 31, 1940
- Running time: 68 minutes
- Country: United States
- Language: English

Blondie Plays Cupid is a 1940 American comedy film starring Penny Singleton and Arthur Lake and directed by Frank R. Strayer. Also in the cast is Glenn Ford. It is the seventh of the 28 Blondie films.

== Plot summary ==
Blondie catches her husband, Dagwood Bumstead, possessing illegal fireworks, and he tries to make up for this by taking her, their son, and dog to Aunt Hannah's ranch for Fourth of July celebrations. The ranch is a peaceful place in the country, but trouble starts already on the way over there, when the Bumsteads board the wrong train, lose their baggage, and have to hitchhike most of the way.

The young couple that picks them up, Millie and Charlie, are on their way to get married and elope together, without their parents' consents. The Bumsteads have to accompany the young couple to court and the wedding ceremony, but the wedding is interrupted by Millie's father, Mr. Tucker, storming in with a shotgun.

Mr. Tucker then takes the car, with Dagwood, his son, and their dog still in it, and drives off. Charlie is forced to take Blondie to Aunt Hannah's ranch, and she encourages him to have another go at marrying Millie and elope. Unfortunately he twists his ankle on the way, and a reluctant Dagwood has to take his place and go and fetch Millie from her (and her father's) home.

Dagwood accidentally climbs through the window to Millie's father's bedroom, and is held at gunpoint. He flees head over heels and is chased around the property. His son discovers what he thinks is some kind of fireworks and lights it, but it is in fact a dynamite stick. When the dynamite explodes it rips up a hole in the ground, and in doing so, opens up an oil well.

Millie's father is so happy over the new source of income that he consents to Charlie marrying his daughter after all, and the Bumsteads finish their weekend holiday at the hospital, in peace and quiet.

== Cast ==
Player	Role
Penny Singleton	Blondie Bumstead
Arthur Lake	Dagwood Bumstead
Larry Simms	Alexander 'Baby Dumpling' Bumstead
Daisy	Herself
Jonathan Hale	J.C. Dithers
Danny Mummert	Alvin Fuddle
Irving Bacon	Mailman
Glenn Ford	Charlie
Luana Walters	Millie
Will Wright	Mr. Tucker
Spencer Charters	Uncle Abner Henderson
Leona Roberts	Aunt Hannah Henderson
Stanley Brown	Ollie Shaw (uncredited)
Mary Jane Carey	Mary, the Secretary (uncredited)
Tommy Dixon	Saunders (uncredited)
Jay Eaton	Kirk (uncredited)
Richard Fiske	Nelson (uncredited)
Si Jenks	Newton 'Newt' Banks, Justice of the Peace (uncredited)
Charles Lane	Train Conductor (uncredited)
Rex Moore	Newsboy (uncredited)
John Tyrrell	Reed, a Workman (uncredited)
