= Blondie Goes to College =

1942 film

- Video cover
- Directed by: Frank R. Strayer
- Screenplay by: Lou Breslow
- Story by: Clyde Bruckman; Warren Wilson
- Based on: comic strip Blondie by Chic Young
- Produced by: Robert Sparks
- Starring: Penny Singleton; Arthur Lake
- Cinematography: Henry Freulich
- Edited by: Otto Meyer
- Music by: M. W. Stoloff
- Distributed by: Columbia Pictures
- Release date: January 15, 1942
- Running time: 74 minutes
- Country: United States
- Language: English

Blondie Goes to College is a 1942 American comedy film directed by Frank R. Strayer. The film is a part of the Blondie series, starring Penny Singleton in the title role. It is the tenth of twenty-eight Blondie movies starring Penny Singleton and Arthur Lake.

== Plot ==
Dagwood Bumstead (Arthur Lake) takes his family to a college football game and decides that he wants to go back to college.

Blondie (Penny Singleton) tries to convince Mr. Dithers to talk Dagwood out of it, but Dithers recommends him to go to get it out of his system. While talking to Mr. Dithers, Blondie tells him that she is pregnant, but that she has not told Dagwood yet since he has enough on his mind.

He goes to school with his wife, but married couples are not allowed. They decide to pretend they aren't a couple, living separately.

A dilemma starts when Laura Wadsworth (Janet Blair) begins to flirt with Dagwood, while Big Man on Campus Rusty Bryant (Larry Parks) does the same with Blondie. Meanwhile, Baby Dumpling goes to a local military school.

Blondie sings "Do I Need You", a song by Sammy Cahn and Saul Chaplin, written for this film.

== Cast ==
- Penny Singleton as Blondie Bumstead, aka Blondie Smith
- Arthur Lake as Dagwood 'Daggie' Bumstead
- Janet Blair as Laura Wadsworth
- Larry Simms as Baby Dumpling Bumstead
- Jonathan Hale as J.C. Dithers
- Adele Mara as Babs Connelly
- Danny Mummert as Alvin Fuddle
- Larry Parks as Rusty Bryant
- Lloyd Bridges as Ben Dixon
- Andrew Tombes as J.J 'Snookie' Wadsworth
- Sid Melton as Mouse
