= Blondie for Victory =

1942 film by Frank R. Strayer

- Directed by: Frank R. Strayer
- Written by: Karen DeWolf; Connie Lee
- Based on: comic strip Blondie by Chic Young
- Produced by: Robert Sparks
- Starring: Penny Singleton; Arthur Lake
- Cinematography: Henry Freulich
- Edited by: Al Clark
- Music by: John Leipold
- Distributed by: Columbia Pictures
- Release date: 6 August 1942
- Running time: 71 min.
- Country: United States
- Language: English

Blondie for Victory is a 1942 American comedy film directed by Frank R. Strayer and starring Penny Singleton and Arthur Lake. It is the 12th entry in the Blondie series of 28 films.

== Plot ==
Blondie Bumstead forms a civilian defense group, Housewives of America, by persuading her housewife neighbors to join. But the forming of the group creates trouble in her own household.

Blondie's husband, Dagwood, isn't happy with coming home every night finding a note saying that his wife is at a meeting with the housewives. And her son, Baby, is left on his own all the time. The family dog, Daisy, roams freely around the house with no one to look after it. The household is falling apart, and the same goes for all the other households in the neighborhood. The other husbands are experiencing very similar situations. they blame Blondie for all this, since she is the one who started the Housewives of America. They go to Dagwood and demand that he act to put an end to the commotion, and get his wife to dissolve the group entirely.

In another different turn of events, Dagwood's boss, J.C. Dithers, has been thrown out of his home, which is to be used by a delegation of soldiers visiting the area. Dithers flees the scene and takes up camp at a nearby hotel, and comes visiting Dagwood in his home. When Dithers is at the Bumstead house, a soldier from the delegation by the name of Herschel Smith comes to look for his host. Seeing the soldier and aware of Dagwood's predicament, Dithers comes up with a plan to disband the Housewives of America once and for all. He urges Dagwood to borrow the soldier's uniform, and go to the camp where the women's group are staying overnight on a training mission. Dagwood is to inform Blondie that he has enlisted in the army.

When Dagwood arrives to the camp all the women are already gone, except for Blondie. The women were scared off by an odd-looking man who was sneaking around the camp, believing that he indeed was a spy, trying to perform an act of sabotage on the nearby dam. Seeing Dagwood in his dashing uniform overwhelms Blondie and makes her realize that her rightful place is in her home, as support of her brave husband going off to war.

Sitting in his underwear at Dagwood's house, Herschel gets the message that he is to report back to active duty. He gets desperate to get his uniform back right away and sets out in search of Dagwood. Herschel arrives at the Housewives of America camp just as Blondie is about to renounce her membership in the group. Following behind him are Dithers and two M.P.s, who are looking for their AWOL soldier.

The M.P.s mistake Dagwood for their lost soldier and begin to chase him, as he runs for the woods and up the mountainside. Running toward the dam, Dagwood catches sight of a little suspicious looking man, climbing up the dam with a parcel under his arm. Dagwood assumes the parcel contains a bomb, and that the man is about to blow up the dam. He starts chasing the man to stop the sabotage, forgetting about his own predicament for a moment. He catches up and struggles with the man for control over the parcel. Just when he gains control over the package, Blondie, Dithers and the two soldiers arrive at the scene.

When they open the package, it turns out it only contained some rationed sugar that the man tried to stow away. However, the soldiers are so impressed by Dagwood's heroics that they forgive him his unlawful wearing of a military uniform. Dagwood returns to his home with his wife and isn't bothered anymore by the Housewives of America.

== Cast ==
- Penny Singleton as Blondie Bumstead
- Arthur Lake as Dagwood Bumstead
- Larry Simms as Alexander "Baby Dumpling" Bumstead
- Majelle White as "Cookie" Bumstead
- Stuart Erwin as Pvt. Herschel Smith
- Jonathan Hale as J.C. Dithers
- Danny Mummert as Alvin Fuddle
- Edward Gargan as Sergeant
- Minta Durfee as Housewife
- Unbilled players include Eddie Acuff, Irving Bacon, Don Beddoe, Russell Hicks, Blanche Payson and Mary Young
