= Jonathan Hale =

Canadian-born film and television actor (1891–1966)

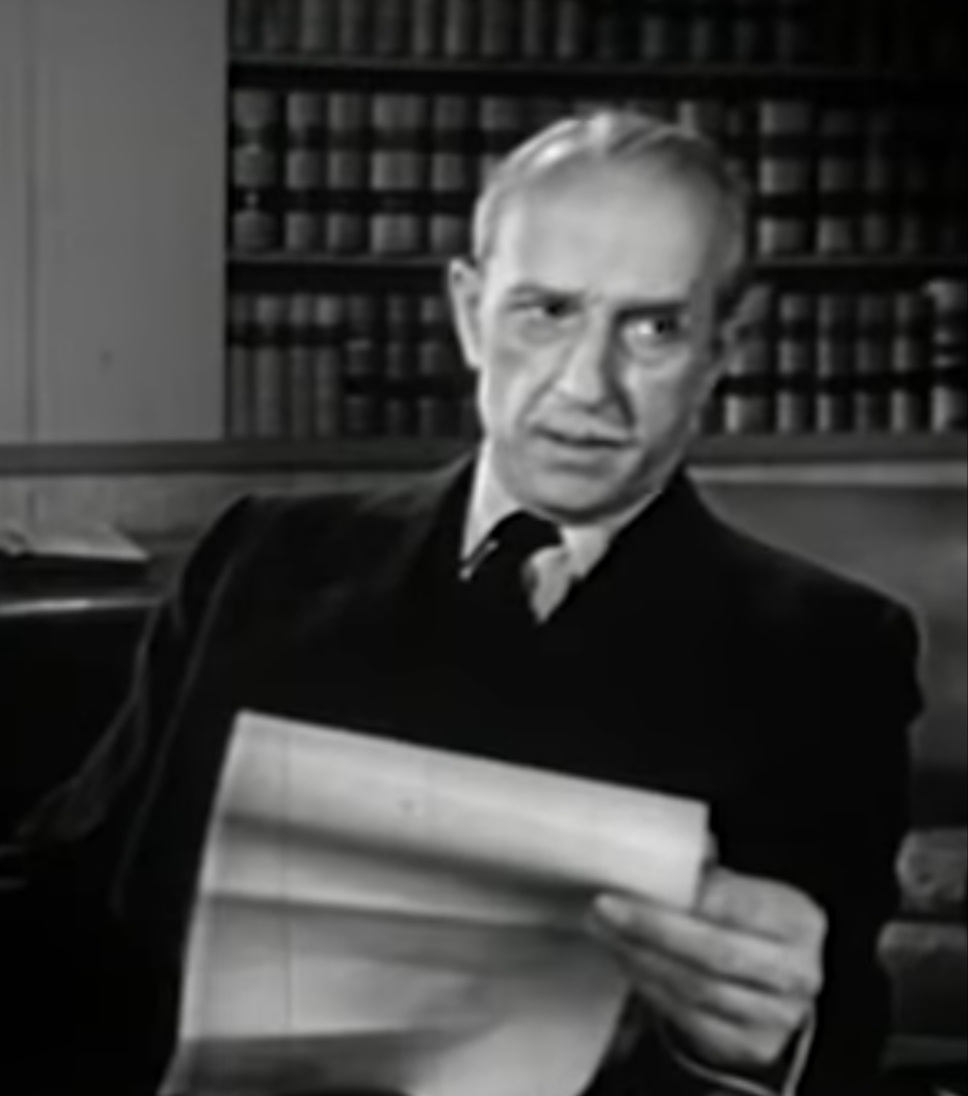
- Hale in Three Husbands (1951)
- Born: Jonathan Hatley; March 21, 1891; Hamilton, Ontario, Canada
- Died: February 28, 1966 (aged 74); Los Angeles, California, U.S.
- Resting place: Valhalla Memorial Park Cemetery in North Hollywood, California
- Occupation: Actor
- Years active: 1934–1965

Jonathan Hale (born Jonathan Hatley; March 21, 1891 – February 28, 1966) was a Canadian-born film and television actor.

== Life and career ==
Hale was born in Hamilton, Ontario, Canada. Before his acting career, Hale worked in the Diplomatic Corps. Hale is most well known as Dagwood Bumstead's boss, Julius Caesar Dithers, in the Blondie film series in the 1940s. He is also notable for playing Inspector Fernack in several installments of The Saint film series.

In 1950, he made two appearances in The Cisco Kid as Barry Owens. He also appeared in two episodes of Adventures of Superman: "The Evil Three", in which he played a murderous "Southern Colonel"-type character, and "Panic in the Sky", in which he played the lead astronomer at the Metropolis Observatory. Other television programs on which Hale appeared include Crossroads, The Loretta Young Show, Brave Eagle, Schlitz Playhouse, The Joey Bishop Show, Our Miss Brooks and Walt Disney's Disneyland: "A Tribute to Joel Chandler Harris".

== Death ==
Hale committed suicide on February 28, 1966, at the age of 74. He was found dead that evening in his room at the Motion Picture & Television Country House and Hospital in Woodland Hills, Los Angeles, California. Hale had taken his own life with a .38 caliber pistol, which was found near his body. He was interred at Valhalla Memorial Park Cemetery in North Hollywood, California. His grave went unmarked for more than four decades, until a proper headstone was erected by donations from the "Dearly Departed" fan-based group in 2013; he is now honored with the inscription, "We Remembered You".

== Selected filmography ==
- Housewife (1934) as Doctor (uncredited)
- The Case of the Howling Dog (1934) as Courtroom Spectator (uncredited)
- A Lost Lady (1934) (uncredited)
- Gentlemen Are Born (1934) as Second Broker (uncredited)
- Lightning Strikes Twice (1934) as Capt. Hobart Nelson
- A Night at the Ritz (1935) as Director (uncredited)
- One New York Night (1935) as Mr. Stokes (uncredited)
- G Men (1935) as Congressman (uncredited)
- Let 'Em Have It (1935) as Microscopic Expert (uncredited)
- Public Hero No. 1 (1935) as Prison Board Member (uncredited)
- The Raven (1935) as Bedside Dr. at Jerry's Right (uncredited)
- Alice Adams (1935) as Mr. Palmer
- Page Miss Glory (1935) as Husband at Train Station (uncredited)
- Navy Wife (1935) as Norton (uncredited)
- Three Kids and a Queen (1935) as Gangster (uncredited)
- A Night at the Opera (1935) as Stage Manager in Opera Box Who Announces Gottlieb's Disappearance (uncredited)
- The Calling of Dan Matthews (1935) as Club Owner (uncredited)
- Too Tough to Kill (1935) as Chairman of the Board (uncredited)
- If You Could Only Cook (1935) as Henry Brown - Member of Board of Directors (uncredited)
- Three Live Ghosts (1936) as Detective Bolton
- Charlie Chan's Secret (1936) as Warren T. Phelps
- You May Be Next (1936) as Army Officer (uncredited)
- The Voice of Bugle Ann (1936) as District Attorney
- Sutter's Gold (1936) as Prosecuting Attorney (uncredited)
- Too Many Parents (1936) as Judge
- The Singing Kid (1936) as Dr. Brown (uncredited)
- Panic on the Air (1936) as Johnson (uncredited)
- The Case Against Mrs. Ames (1936) as Judge at First Trial
- Educating Father (1936) as Fred Humphrey
- Fury (1936) as Defense Attorney
- Parole! (1936) as Parole Board Member (uncredited)
- Spendthrift (1936) as Attorney (uncredited)
- 36 Hours to Kill (1936) as Conductor
- Charlie Chan at the Race Track (1936) as Warren Fenton
- China Clipper (1936) as State Department Official (uncredited)
- Down the Stretch (1936) as Secretary M.L. Lyon (uncredited)
- The Devil Is a Sissy (1936) as Judge Holmes
- The Magnificent Brute (1936) as Official (uncredited)
- Easy to Take (1936) as Mr. Hardy (uncredited)
- The Plainsman (1936) as Major (uncredited)
- The Accusing Finger (1936) as Special Prosecutor
- Born to Dance (1936) as Hector the Columnist (uncredited)
- Flying Hostess (1936) as Kendall
- Happy Go Lucky (1936) as J. Lansing Bennett
- Sinner Take All (1936) as Dr. Harrison (uncredited)
- Mysterious Crossing (1936) as Garland - Banker (uncredited)
- You Only Live Once (1937) as District Attorney (uncredited)
- She's Dangerous (1937) as Charles Fitzgerald
- Man of the People (1937) as Carter Spetner
- Outcast (1937) as Judge (uncredited)
- A Doctor's Diary (1937) as Mr. Williams (uncredited)
- Sea Devils (1937) as Court-Martial President (uncredited)
- John Meade's Woman (1937) as Mr. Melton
- Racketeers in Exile (1937) as Alden Parker
- The Man Who Found Himself (1937) as Dr. Tom Smythe (uncredited)
- A Star Is Born (1937) as Judge George J. Parris (uncredited)
- You Can't Buy Luck (1937) as Prosecutor (uncredited)
- Wings Over Honolulu (1937) as Judge Advocate (uncredited)
- Charlie Chan at the Olympics (1937) as Hopkins
- The League of Frightened Men (1937) as Alexander Drummond
- This Is My Affair (1937) as Judge
- Midnight Madonna (1937) as Stuart Kirkland
- Saratoga (1937) as Frank Clayton
- Danger – Love at Work (1937) as Parsons
- Madame X (1937) as Hugh Fariman Sr
- Carnival Queen (1937) as Robert Jacoby
- Big Town Girl (1937) as Hershell
- Exiled to Shanghai (1937) as J.B. Willet
- Arsène Lupin Returns (1938) as F.B.I. Special Agent
- Mad About Music (1938) as Prosecutor, Film Within a Film (uncredited)
- The First Hundred Years (1938) as Judge Parker
- Her Jungle Love (1938) as J.C. Martin
- Judge Hardy's Children (1938) as John Lee
- Over the Wall (1938) as Governor
- Island in the Sky (1938) as Prison Warden Matthews (uncredited)
- Yellow Jack (1938) as Major General Leonard Wood
- Gangs of New York (1938) as Warden
- The Saint in New York (1938) as Inspector Henry Fernack
- Wives Under Suspicion (1938) as Allison
- Crime Ring (1938) as Bank President (uncredited)
- Men with Wings (1938) as Long (uncredited)
- Letter of Introduction (1938) as Lou Woodstock
- Boys Town (1938) as John Hargraves
- Fugitives for a Night (1938) as Police Captain
- Breaking the Ice (1938) as Kane
- Tarnished Angel (1938) as Detective Sgt. Edward Cramer
- Blondie (1938) as J.C. Dithers
- Road Demon (1938) as Anderson
- The Duke of West Point (1938) as Colonel Early
- There's That Woman Again (1938) as Rolfe Davis
- Stand Up and Fight (1939) as Colonel Webb
- Wings of the Navy (1939) as Commandant
- Tail Spin (1939) as Racing Official Starter (uncredited)
- Blondie Meets the Boss (1939) as Dithers
- The Saint Strikes Back (1939) as Inspector Henry Fernack
- The Story of Alexander Graham Bell (1939) as President of Western Union
- In Name Only (1939) as Dr. Ned Gateson
- In Old Monterey (1939) as Stevenson
- Fugitive at Large (1939) as Prison Warden (uncredited)
- Thunder Afloat (1939) as Admiral Girard
- Blondie Brings Up Baby (1939) as J.C. Dithers
- The Amazing Mr. Williams (1939) as Mayor
- Barricade (1939) as Assistant Secretary of State
- The Big Guy (1939) as Jack Lang
- The Saint's Double Trouble (1940) as Inspector Henry Fernack
- Johnny Apollo (1940) as Dr. Brown
- The Saint Takes Over (1940) as Inspector Henry Fernack
- Private Affairs (1940) as George Gilkin
- We Who Are Young (1940) as Braddock
- Blondie Has Servant Trouble (1940) as J.C. Dithers
- Dulcy (1940) as Homer Patterson
- Melody and Moonlight (1940) as Otis Barnett
- Blondie Plays Cupid (1940) as J.C. Dithers
- The Saint in Palm Springs (1941) as Inspector Henry Fernack
- Flight from Destiny (1941) as District Attorney
- Blondie Goes Latin (1941) as Mr. J.C. Dithers
- The Great Swindle (1941) as Swann
- Strange Alibi (1941) as Police Chief Sprague
- Her First Beau (1941) as Mr. Harris
- Blondie in Society (1941) as J.C. Dithers
- Ringside Maisie (1941) as Dr. Kramer
- The Pittsburgh Kid (1941) as Max Ellison
- The Bugle Sounds (1942) as Brigadier-General
- Blondie Goes to College (1942) as J.C. Dithers
- Joe Smith, American (1942) as Blake McKettrick
- The Lone Star Ranger (1942) as Judge [John] Longstreth
- Blondie's Blessed Event (1942) as J.C. Dithers
- Miss Annie Rooney (1942) as Mr. White
- Flight Lieutenant (1942) as Joseph Sanford
- Calling Dr. Gillespie (1942) as Frank Marshall Todwell
- Blondie for Victory (1942) as J.C. Dithers
- The Amazing Mrs. Holliday (1943) as Ferguson
- Hangmen Also Die! (1943) as Dedic
- It's a Great Life (1943) as J.C. Dithers
- Nobody's Darling (1943) as Jason Rhodes
- Footlight Glamour (1943) as J.C. Dithers
- Sweet Rosie O'Grady (1943) as Mr. Fox
- Jack London (1943) as Kerwin Maxwell
- There's Something About a Soldier (1943) as General Sommerton
- This Is the Life (1944) as Dr. Plum
- The Black Parachute (1944) as King Stephen
- Since You Went Away (1944) as Second Train Conductor (uncredited)
- My Buddy (1944) as Senator Henry
- End of the Road (1944) as Gregory McCune
- Dead Man's Eyes (1944) as Dr. Welles
- And Now Tomorrow (1944) as Dr. Sloane (uncredited)
- Hollywood Canteen (1944) as Mr. Brodel (uncredited)
- Leave It to Blondie (1945) as J.C. Dithers
- G. I. Honeymoon (1945) as Colonel Hammerhead Smith
- The Phantom Speaks (1945) as Owen McAllister
- Divorce (1945) as Judge Conlon
- Allotment Wives (1945) as Brig. General H. N. Gilbert
- Man Alive (1945) as Osborne
- Dakota (1945) as Col. Wordin
- The Strange Mr. Gregory (1945) as Defense Attorney Blair
- Life with Blondie (1945) as J.C. Dithers
- Gay Blades (1946) as Whittlesey
- Riverboat Rhythm (1946) as Colonel Edward Beeler
- Blondie's Lucky Day (1946) as J.C. Dithers
- The Cat Creeps (1946) as Walter Elliot
- The Walls Came Tumbling Down (1946) as Captain Griffin
- Easy to Wed (1946) as Hector Boswell
- Angel on My Shoulder (1946) as Citizens for Better Government Chairman (uncredited)
- Blondie Knows Best (1946) as J.C. Dithers
- Rolling Home (1946) as Henry Kane
- Wife Wanted (1946) as Philip Conway
- The Strange Mr. Gregory (1946) as Blair
- The Beginning or the End (1947) as Dr. Vannevar Bush
- The Ghost Goes Wild (1947) as Max Atterbury
- The Vigilantes Return (1947) as Judge Holden
- Black Gold (1947) as Senator Watkins
- Her Husband's Affairs (1947) as Gov. Fox
- High Wall (1947) as Emory Garrison
- Rocky (1948) as Kenneth Forrester
- Call Northside 777 (1948) as Robert Winston - Governor's Aide (uncredited)
- King of the Gamblers (1948) as Sam Hyland
- Silver River (1948) as Major Spencer
- Tap Roots (1948) as General Johnston (uncredited)
- Michael O'Halloran (1948) as Judge Schaffner
- Johnny Belinda (1948) as Dr. Horace M. Gray (uncredited)
- Disaster (1948) as Police Commissioner Jerome
- Rose of the Yukon (1949) as Gen. Butler
- Tell It to the Judge (1949) as Judge Allan J. Brooks
- State Department: File 649 (1949) as Director-General
- Stampede (1949) as Varick
- The Fountainhead (1949) as Guy Francon (uncredited)
- A Dangerous Profession (1949) as Roger Lennert, Lucy's Attorney (uncredited)
- The Baron of Arizona (1950) as Governor
- Federal Agent at Large (1950) as James Goodwin
- Triple Trouble (1950) as Judge
- Three Husbands (1950) as Edward Wurdeman, Attorney at Law
- Short Grass (1950) as Charlie Bissel
- Insurance Investigator (1951) as Russell James
- Strangers on a Train (1951) as Mr. Antony
- Rodeo King and the Senorita (1951) as Dr. Sands
- Let's Go Navy! (1951) as Captain
- The Tall Target (1951) as Passenger from Carolina (uncredited)
- Sunny Side of the Street (1951) as Cyrus Pelley
- Scandal Sheet (1952) as Frank Madison
- Carbine Williams (1952) as Judge Henry P. Lane (uncredited)
- Young Man with Ideas (1952) as Stanley Rickson (uncredited)
- Son of Paleface (1952) as Gov. Freeman (uncredited)
- The Steel Trap (1952) as Tom Bowers
- Taxi (1953) as Mr. Barker (uncredited)
- Kansas Pacific (1953) as Sherman Johnson
- The Flaming Urge (1953) as Mr. Chalmers
- Duffy of San Quentin (1954) as Boyd
- She Couldn't Say No (1954) as John Bentley (uncredited)
- Men of the Fighting Lady (1954) as Home Movie Commentator (uncredited)
- Cattle Queen of Montana (1954) (uncredited)
- The Night Holds Terror (1955) as Bob Henderson
- Jaguar (1956) as Dr. Powell
- The Three Outlaws (1956) as Pinkerton
