= Blondie Takes a Vacation =

1939 film by Frank R. Strayer

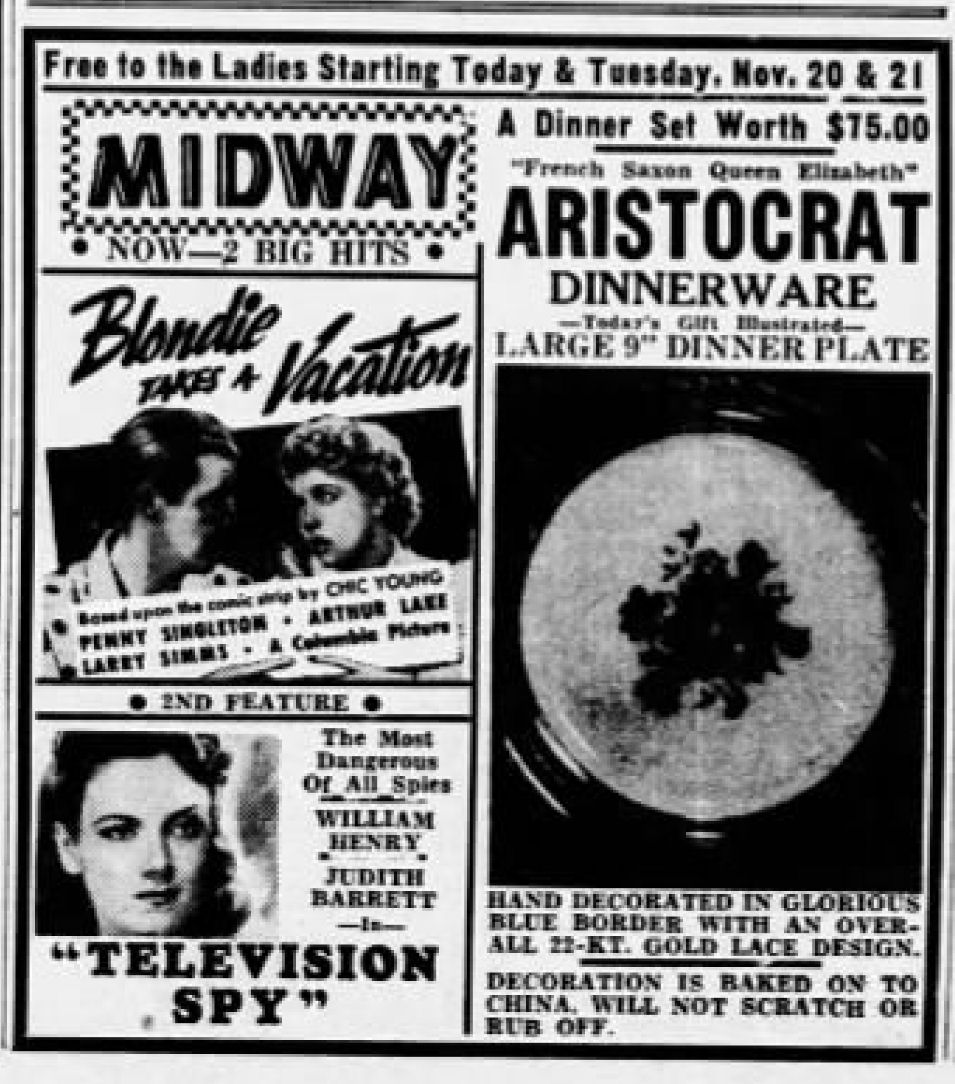
- Blondie Takes a Vacation & Television Spy 1939 ads
- Directed by: Frank R. Strayer
- Screenplay by: Richard Flournoy
- Story by: Karen DeWolf; Robert Chapin
- Based on: comic strip Blondie by Chic Young
- Produced by: Robert Sparks
- Starring: Penny Singleton; Arthur Lake; Larry Simms
- Cinematography: Henry Freulich
- Edited by: Viola Lawrence
- Music by: M. W. Stoloff
- Production company: King Features Syndicate
- Distributed by: Columbia Pictures
- Release date: July 20, 1939 (US)
- Running time: 69 minutes
- Country: United States
- Language: English

Blondie Takes a Vacation is a 1939 American black-and-white comedy film directed by Frank R. Strayer and starring Penny Singleton, Arthur Lake, and Larry Simms. The film is based on Chic Young's comic strip of the same name.

This was the third of 28 films based on the comic strip; Columbia Pictures produced them from 1938 to 1943.

== Plot ==
The Bumsteads finally take a vacation at a mountain lake, but discover the failing hotel is about to be foreclosed on for lack of business, and its utilities cut off. Dagwood generously pitches in with schemes to help the elderly and bewildered proprietors attract more business.

== Cast ==
- Penny Singleton as Blondie
- Arthur Lake as Dagwood
- Larry Simms as Baby Dumpling
- Daisy as Daisy the Dog
- Danny Mummert as Alvin Fuddle
- Donald Meek as Jonathan N. Gillis
- Donald MacBride as Harvey Morton
- Thomas W. Ross as Matthew Dickerson
- Elizabeth Dunn as Mrs. Emily Dickerson
- Robert Wilcox as John Larkin
- Harlan Briggs as Mr. Holden
- Irving Bacon as Letter Carrier
- Arthur Aylesworth as Sheriff Weaver
- Wade Boteler as Engineer
- Harry Harvey Sr. as Poker Player
- Arthur Housman as Tipsy Train Traveler
- Milton Kibbee as Grocery Creditor
- Christine McIntyre as Resort Singer-'Love in Bloom'
- Robert McKenzie as Plumbing Creditor
- Dave Willock as Hotel Desk Clerk

== Production ==
Production for the film took place in May 1939 to June 1939.
