= Blondie on a Budget =

1940 film by Frank R. Strayer

- Directed by: Frank R. Strayer
- Written by: Richard Flournoy; Charles M. Brown
- Based on: comic strip Blondie by Chic Young
- Produced by: Robert Sparks
- Starring: Penny Singleton; Arthur Lake; Rita Hayworth; Danny Mummert
- Cinematography: Henry Freulich
- Edited by: Gene Havlick
- Music by: Leigh Harline
- Production company: Columbia Pictures
- Distributed by: Columbia Pictures
- Release date: February 29, 1940
- Running time: 72 minutes
- Country: United States
- Language: English

Blondie on a Budget is a 1940 American comedy film directed by Frank R. Strayer and starring Penny Singleton, Arthur Lake and Rita Hayworth. It is the fifth entry into the long-running Blondie series of films, which ran between 1938 and 1950.

== Plot ==
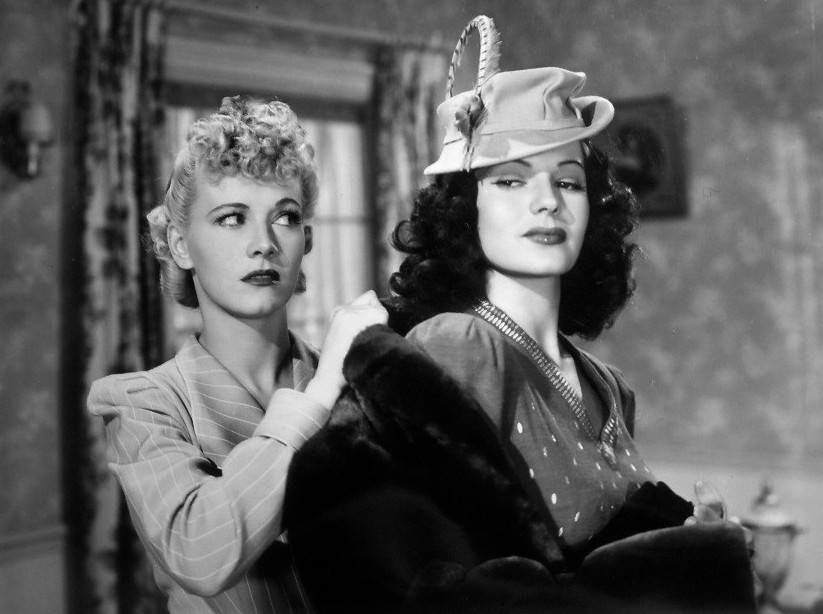
Penny Singleton and Rita Hayworth in Blondie on a Budget

Blondie Bumstead is having trouble balancing the family budget, particularly as she wants to buy a new fur coat. Her husband Dagwood also needs money for the membership fee of a fishing club he wants to join. Blondie becomes jealous when she finds Dagwood with an overfamiliar old friend, Joan Forrester, and begins to suspect that they are having an affair. After Dagwood wins money in a competition he decides to buy Blondie a fur coat, but uses Joan to try it on for size. Blondie sees them in the shop together and mistakenly thinks he is buying it for Joan. She decides to leave Dagwood for good, only to have a last minute change of heart.

== Cast ==
- Penny Singleton as Blondie Bumstead
- Arthur Lake as Dagwood Bumstead
- Rita Hayworth as Joan Forrester
- Danny Mummert as Alvin Fuddle
- Larry Simms as Baby Dumpling Bumstead
- Don Beddoe as Marvin Williams
- John Qualen as Mr. Ed Fuddle
- Fay Helm as Mrs. Fuddle
- Irving Bacon as Mailman
- Thurston Hall as Brice
- William Brisbane as Theatre Manager
- Emory Parnell as Policeman Dempsey
- Willie Best as Newspaper Boy

== Bibliography ==
- Young, Nancy K. & Young, William H. World War II and the Postwar Years in America: A Historical and Cultural Encyclopedia. ABC-CLIO, 2010.
