= Shut My Big Mouth =

1942 film directed by Charles Barton

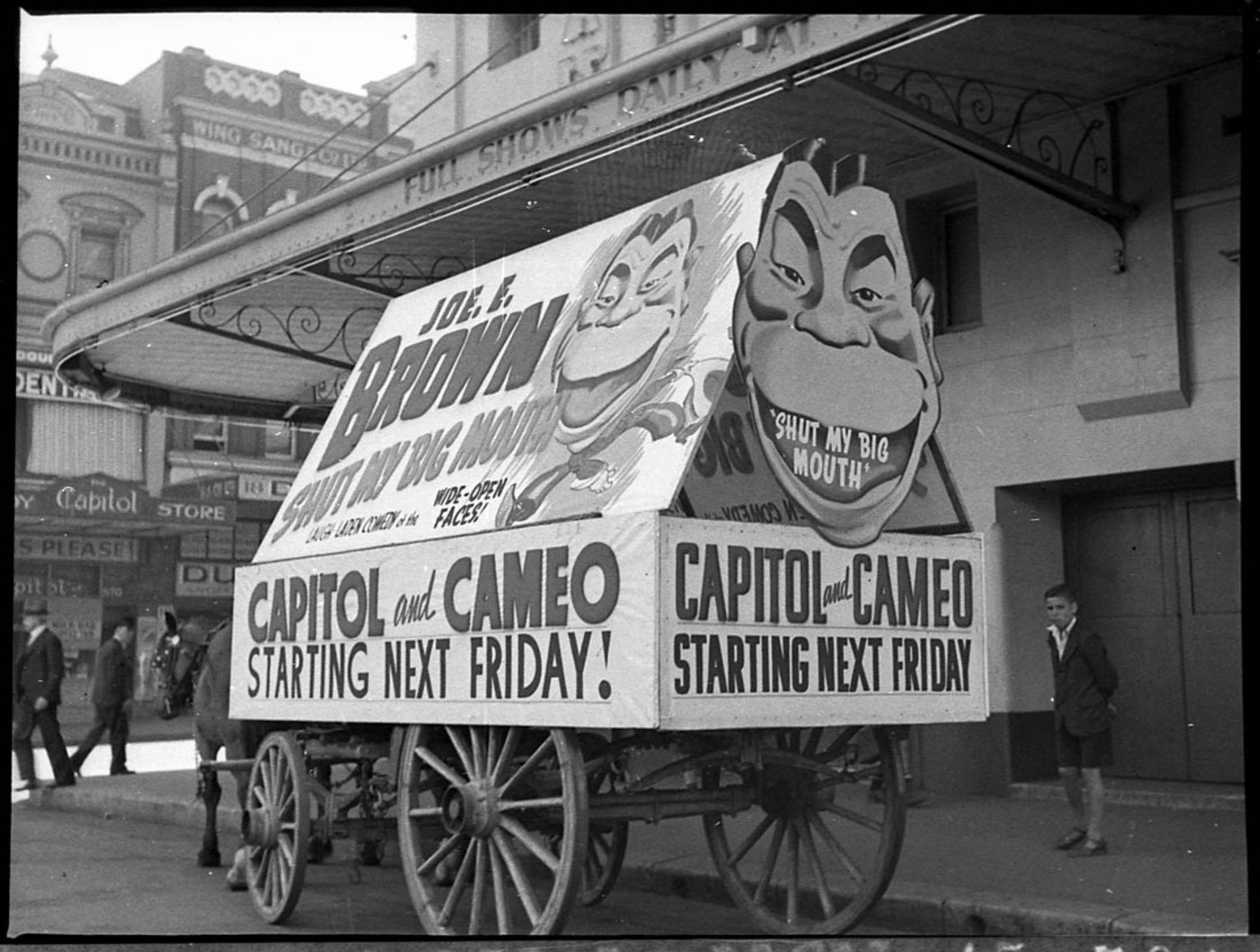
- 1945 advertisement for film in Australia
- Directed by: Charles Barton
- Screenplay by: Oliver Drake; Karen DeWolf; Francis Martin
- Story by: Oliver Drake
- Produced by: Robert Sparks
- Starring: Joe E. Brown
- Cinematography: Henry Freulich
- Edited by: Gene Havlick
- Music by: John Leipold
- Production company: Columbia Pictures
- Distributed by: Columbia Pictures
- Release date: February 19, 1942
- Running time: 71 minutes
- Country: United States
- Language: English

Shut My Big Mouth is a 1942 American comedy Western film directed by Charles Barton and starring Joe E. Brown.

== Plot ==
A shy horticulturist becomes involved with a local criminal in the old west.

== Cast ==
- Joe E. Brown as Wellington Holmes
- Adele Mara as Elena Conchita Montoya
- Victor Jory as Buckskin Bill
- Fritz Feld as Robert Oglethorpe
- Don Beddoe as Hill
- Lloyd Bridges as Skinny
- Forrest Tucker as Red
- Will Wright as Long
- Russell Simpson as Mayor Potter
- Pedro de Cordoba as Don Carlos Montoya
- Joan Woodbury as Maria
- Ralph Peters as Butch
- Joe McGuinn as Hank
- Noble Johnson as Chief Standing Bull
- Chief Thundercloud as Indian Interpreter (as Chief Thunder Cloud)
