= It's a Great Life (1943 film) =

1943 film by Frank R. Strayer

- Directed by: Frank R. Strayer
- Screenplay by: Connie Lee; Karen DeWolf
- Based on: It's a Great Life by Chic Young
- Produced by: Frank R. Strayer
- Starring: Penny Singleton; Arthur Lake; Larry Simms
- Cinematography: L. William O'Connell
- Edited by: Al Clark
- Music by: M. W. Stoloff
- Production company: King Features Syndicate
- Distributed by: Columbia Pictures
- Release date: May 27, 1943
- Running time: 68 minutes
- Country: United States
- Language: English

It's a Great Life is a 1943 black-and-white film and is the 13th of the 28 Blondie films. It is one of only two movies in the series that did not feature "Blondie" in the title (the other, Footlight Glamour, was released later the same year).

== Plot ==
At home, Dagwood Bumstead mishears his boss, Mr. Dithers, giving him an order on the phone. He is to negotiate a price to buy a certain house from its owner (who also has a horse for sale). With the bedlam in the house, Mr. Dithers has to raise his voice to be heard. Dagwood only clearly hears the end of the call when Dithers states he is "getting a little hoarse." Dagwood aims to please his boss.

At the seller's, he overhears the seller on the phone about to accept an offer. Dagwood thinks it's about the horse, and buys Reggie.

The seller will not take Reggie back. Complications ensue when Dagwood tries to sell him. (The horse is rather intelligent; he and the Bumsteads have also grown fond of each other.)

== Cast ==
- Penny Singleton as Blondie
- Arthur Lake as Dagwood
- Larry Simms as Baby Dumpling
- Daisy as Daisy the Dog
- Reggie as Reggie the Horse
- Hugh Herbert as Timothy Brewster
- Jonathan Hale as J.C. Dithers
- Danny Mummert as Alvin Fuddle
- Alan Dinehart as Collender Martin
- Douglas Leavitt as Bromley
- Stanley Brown as Ollie Shaw
- Irving Bacon as Mailman
- Marjorie Ann Mutchie as Cookie
- Emory Parnell as Policeman
- Ray Walker as Salesman
