= Blondie Goes Latin =

1941 film by Frank R. Strayer

- Directed by: Frank R. Strayer; Robert Sparks
- Written by: Richard Flournoy; Karen DeWolf
- Based on: comic strip Blondie by Chic Young
- Produced by: Robert Sparks
- Starring: Penny Singleton; Arthur Lake; Tito Guízar
- Cinematography: Henry Freulich
- Edited by: Gene Havlick
- Music by: Leo Arnaud
- Production company: King Features Syndicate
- Distributed by: Columbia Pictures
- Release date: February 27, 1941
- Running time: 68 minutes
- Country: United States
- Language: English

Blondie Goes Latin, also known as Conga Swing, is a 1941 American comedy film directed by Frank R. Strayer and Robert Sparks and starring Penny Singleton, Arthur Lake, and Larry Simms. It is the eighth of the Blondie films. The film showcases musical numbers of Kirby Grant, Ruth Terry, Tito Guizar, with Arthur Lake displaying his drum skills, Penny Singleton her singing and dancing prowess.

== Plot ==
Mr. Dithers generously invites the three Bumsteads to go with him on an ocean cruise to Latin America and "not think about business." As they are on the ship ready to leave, a telegram arrives from a buyer anxious to meet very soon to purchase a property the Dithers company has had on sale for a long time. Because Dithers badly needs to relax from stress, it is decided that just Dagwood alone should return home to meet with the client. However, before Dagwood can debark, the drummer of the ship's dance band is taken ill, so Dagwood, despite his protests, is recruited to take his place. He dresses as a woman while drumming, so his family and Dithers won't recognize him. Meanwhile, a handsome Latin gentleman on board shows Blondie attention and dines with her. In the end, Dagwood's remaining on the ship turns out to be fortuitous, as the client buying the property is revealed as a con man.

== Cast ==
- Penny Singleton as Blondie Bumstead
- Arthur Lake as Dagwood Bumstead
- Larry Simms as Baby Dumpling Bumstead
- Daisy as Daisy
- Ruth Terry as Lovey Nelson, the Singer
- Danny Mummert as Alvin Fuddle
- Jonathan Hale as Mr. J.C. Dithers
- Janet Burston as Little Girl Singer and Piano Player
- Kirby Grant as Hal Trent, Orchestra Leader
- Tito Guízar as Manuel Rodríguez

== Soundtrack ==
- You Don't Play a Drum, You Beat It
  - Music and Lyrics by Chet Forrest and Bob Wright
  - Played by Kirby Grant and Orchestra with Arthur Lake on drums
  - Sung by Ruth Terry an orchestra quartet
  - Reprised at the end by the orchestra and Penny Singleton
- I Hate Music Lessons
  - Music and Lyrics by Chet Forrest and Bob Wright
  - Played on piano by Janet Burston
  - Sung by Janet Burston and Larry Simms
- Solteiro e melhor
  - Music and Lyrics by Ruben Sores and Felisberto Silva
  - English Lyrics by William Morgan
  - Played by Kirby Grant and Orchestra with Tito Guízar on guitar
  - Sung in Spanish by Tito Guízar
- Querida
  - Music and Lyrics by Chet Forrest and Bob Wright
  - Played by Kirby Grant and Orchestra with Tito Guízar on guitar
  - Sung in Spanish by Tito Guízar
  - Reprised by Tito Guízar and Penny Singleton singing in English
  - Reprised again by Penny Singleton at the end
- You Can Cry On My Shoulder
  - Music and Lyrics by Chet Forrest and Bob Wright
  - Played by Kirby Grant and Orchestra with Arthur Lake on drums
  - Sung by Ruth Terry an orchestra quartet
- Brazilian Cotillion
  - Music and Lyrics by Chet Forrest and Bob Wright
  - Played by Kirby Grant and Orchestra
  - Sung by Tito Guízar, Penny Singleton and the orchestra quartet
  - Danced to by Tito Guízar and Penny Singleton
  - Reprised at the end with Penny Singleton dancing with Arthur Lake and Larry Simms dancing with Janet Burston

== Bibliography ==
- Young, Nancy K. & Young, William H. World War II and the Postwar Years in America: A Historical and Cultural Encyclopedia. ABC-CLIO, 2010.
