= Murder at Midnight (1931 film) =

1931 film

- Directed by: Frank R. Strayer
- Written by: Scott Darling (dialogue); Scott Darling (story); Frank R. Strayer (story)
- Produced by: Phil Goldstone (producer)
- Starring: Aileen Pringle; Alice White; Hale Hamilton; Brandon Hurst
- Cinematography: William Rees
- Edited by: John Rawlins
- Music by: Val Burton
- Distributed by: Tiffany Pictures
- Release date: September 1, 1931
- Running time: 69 minutes
- Country: United States
- Language: English

Murder at Midnight (a.k.a. The Monster Kills) is a 1931 American pre-Code murder mystery whodunnit directed by Frank R. Strayer.

== Plot ==
A murder during a game of charades at a society party leads the police to begin the hunt through the guest-list for a motive and culprit, involving a changed will and booby-trapped telephones. The killer strikes several more times to conceal his or her identity, until all is revealed.

== Cast ==
- Aileen Pringle as Esme Kennedy
- Alice White as Millie Scripps
- Hale Hamilton as Phillip Montrose
- Robert Elliott as Inspector Taylor
- Clara Blandick as Aunt Julia Gray Kennedy
- Brandon Hurst as Lawrence
- Leslie Fenton as Walter Grayson
- William Humphrey as Colton
- Tyrell Davis as The Englishman
- Kenneth Thomson as Jim Kennedy
- Robert Ellis as Duncan Channing

== Post production ==
A film within a film with the same title, Murder at Midnight, and similar plot is featured in The Mirror Crack'd (1980).

== Preservation status ==
- A print is preserved in the Library of Congress collection Packard Campus for Audio-Visual Conservation. A working/alternative title is The Monster Kills.
