= Frank R. Strayer =

Actor, film writer, director and producer

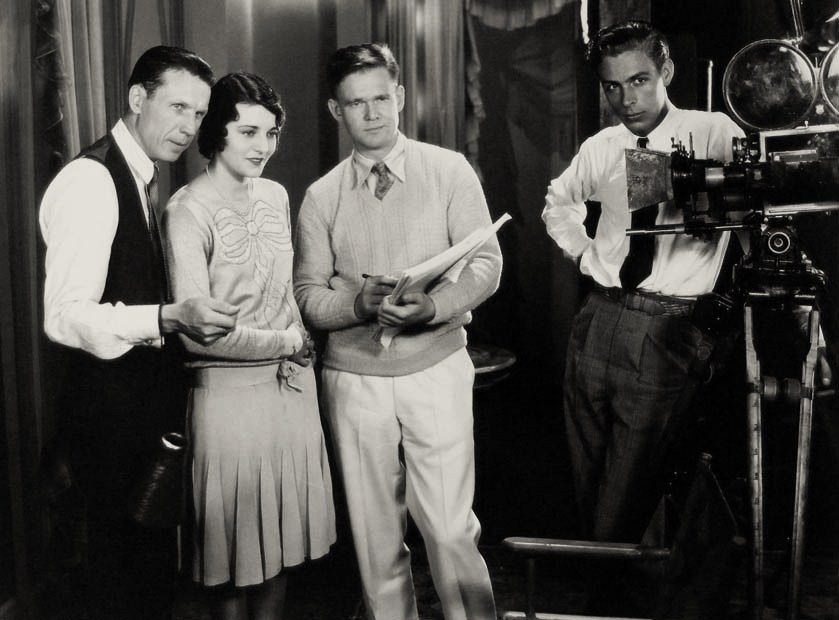
- Frank Strayer (left) on the set of Moran of the Marines (1928)
- Born: Frank Raymond Strayer; September 21, 1891
- Died: February 3, 1964 (aged 72)
- Occupations: Actor; Film writer Film director Film producer
- Years active: 1920s-1950s

Frank Raymond Strayer (September 21, 1891 – February 3, 1964) was an actor, film writer, director and producer. He was active from the mid-1920s until the early 1950s and directed 14 of the series of Blondie (1938) movies.

== Biography ==
Strayer attended Carnegie Tech and then the Pennsylvania Military Academy. After graduating, he served in the Navy during World War I and after the war found work at Metro Studios, which would later become MGM. While there, he worked as an assistant director and also acted in a number of films. During the 1920s, he moved to Columbia Pictures and became a successful writer, director and producer.

== Filmography ==
=== Writer ===
- The Man Who (1921)
- By Appointment Only (1933)
- Murder at Midnight (1931)

=== Director ===
Strayer is credited with having directed 86 films. These include 14 movies in a series based on the Blondie and Dagwood comic strip, dramas such as Manhattan Tower (1931), starring Mary Brian and James Hall, and several horror films, including The Monster Walks (1932). Unless otherwise noted, credits below are as listed in the AFI database.

- An Enemy Of Men (1925)
- The Fate of a Flirt (1925)
- The Lure of the Wild (1925)
- Rose of the World (1925)
- Steppin' Out (1925)
- Sweet Rosie O'Grady (1926)
- When the Wife's Away (1926)
- Pleasure Before Business (1927)
- The Bachelor's Baby (1927)
- Now We're in the Air (1927)
- Rough House Rosie (1927)
- Just Married (1928)
- Moran of the Marines (1928)
- Partners in Crime (1928)
- Acquitted (1929)
- The Fall of Eve (1929)
- Borrowed Wives (1930)
- Let's Go Places (1930)
- Anybody's Blonde (1931)
- Caught Cheating (1931)
- Dragnet Patrol (1931)
- Soul of the Slums (1931)
- Murder at Midnight (1931)
- The Monster Walks (1932)
- Dynamite Denny (1932)
- Manhattan Tower (1932)
- The Crusader (1932)
- Tangled Destinies (1932)
- Gorilla Ship (1932)
- Love in High Gear (1932)
- Behind Stone Walls (1932)
- La melodía prohibida (1933)
- El rey de los gitanos (1933)
- The Vampire Bat (1933)
- In the Money (1933)
- By Appointment Only (1933)
- Dance Girl Dance (1933)
- Las fronteras del amor (1934)
- La cruz y la espada (1934)
- Fugitive Road (1934)
- In Love with Life (1934)
- The Ghost Walks (1934)
- Cross Streets (1934)
- Fifteen Wives (1934)
- Port of Lost Dreams (1934)
- One in a Million (1934)
- Twin Husbands (1934)
- Condemned to Live (1935)
- Public Opinion (1935)
- Death from a Distance (1935)
- Symphony of Living (1935)
- Society Fever (1935)
- Sea Spoilers (1936)
- Hitch Hike to Heaven (1936)
- Laughing at Trouble (1936)
- Murder at Glen Athol (1936)
- The Jones Family in Big Business (1937)
- Off to the Races (1937)
- Borrowing Trouble (1937)
- Hot Water (1937)
- Blondie! (1938)
- Blondie Brings Up Baby (1939)
- Blondie Meets the Boss (1939)
- Blondie Takes a Vacation (1939)
- Blondie Has Servant Trouble (1940)
- Blondie on a Budget (1940)
- Blondie Plays Cupid (1940)
- Blondie Goes Latin (1941)
- Blondie in Society (1941)
- Go West, Young Lady (1941)
- Blondie for Victory (1942)
- Blondie Goes to College (1942)
- Blondie's Blessed Event (1942)
- Daring Young Man (1942)
- Footlight Glamour (1943)
- It's a Great Life (1943)
- Mama Loves Papa (1945)
- Senorita from the West (1945)
- I Ring Doorbells (1946)
- Messenger of Peace (1947)
- Reaching from Heaven (1948)
- The Sickle or the Cross (1949)
- The Pilgrimage Play (1949)
- Venture of Faith (1951)

=== Producer ===
- Footlight Glamour (1943)
- It's a Great Life (1943)

=== Actor ===
- The Man Who (1921)
