= Karen DeWolf =

American screenwriter (1904–1989)

- Born: Muriel Valentine Quack; February 14, 1904; New York, New York, U.S.
- Died: July 20, 1989 (aged 85); Encino, Los Angeles, California, U.S.
- Occupations: Screenwriter, author
- Spouses: John; Warfield Wells (divorced) Conrad Wells (divorced) Eric DeWolf: Dennis Grady

Karen DeWolf (1904–1989), sometimes known as Gypsy Wells, was an American screenwriter and novelist credited on over 50 films during her 20+ years in Hollywood. She's best known for her work on Columbia's Blondie films, in addition to movies like Nine Girls and Johnny Allegro. She also wrote a book, Take the Laughter, in 1940.

== Biography ==
=== Early life ===
DeWolf was born Muriel Valentine Quack, the only child of Hugh Quack and Florence Morrow in Manhattan. After her family moved west, she graduated from high school in Alameda, California.

She had dreams of becoming an actress, and caused quite a stir at 17 by posing in a swimsuit for a photo that ended up on the cover of National Police Gazette. (After being suspended, DeWolf would tell her principal she had never agreed for those photos—which were taken with the intent of furthering her ambition to be an actress—to be used in that manner.)

She briefly gave up her Hollywood dreams, however, when she married her first husband, real estate developer John Warfield Wells, at age 19. At this time, she assumed the stage name Gypsy Wells and performed in the San Francisco Bay Area as a dancer. The marriage would soon end in divorce.

=== Hollywood career ===
After moving to Hollywood, DeWolf married cinematographer Abraham Fried, aka Conrad Wells, in 1926, but the pair separated in the late 1920s, shortly before Wells died in a freak plane accident in 1930 on the set of Such Men Are Dangerous. Soon after, she married Eric DeWolf, president of the California Etchers' Association.

When DeWolf first arrived in Hollywood, she hoped to be an actress, but she eventually discovered a love for screenwriting. She slipped a script to director Lowell Sherman on set one day, and he brought her on as an editor and dialogue director. From there, she worked her way into writing rooms, gaining work on a number of franchises, including the Charlie Chan films, the Jones Family films, and the Blondie films. She never did make an appearance on film as an actress.

=== Blacklisting ===
Though one source indicates she was blacklisted during the McCarthy era for alleged Communist ties, DeWolf worked steadily in Hollywood as a writer (and using her established name) through 1958, well past the blacklist's height (and McCarthy's 1957 death). After 1953, all of DeWolf's credits were for TV, including over 30 episodes of The Ford Television Theatre.

=== Personal life ===
DeWolf was married four times: first to John Warfield Wells, then to Conrad Wells, then to Eric DeWolf, and then to Dennis Grady.

== Selected filmography ==
- Silver Lode (1954)
- Appointment in Honduras (1953)
- Count the Hours! (1953)
- When You're Smiling (1950)
- Holiday in Havana (1949)
- Johnny Allegro (1949)
- Make Believe Ballroom (1949)
- Slightly French (1949)
- Adventures of Casanova (1948)
- Bury Me Dead (1947)
- Stepchild (1947)
- The Cockeyed Miracle (1946)
- Getting Gertie's Garter (1945)
- Nine Girls (1944)
- Footlight Glamour (1943)
- It's a Great Life (1943)
- Daring Young Man (1943)
- Blondie for Victory (1942)
- Meet the Stewarts (1942)
- Blondie's Blessed Event (1942)
- Shut My Big Mouth (1942)
- Go West, Young Lady (1941)
- Tillie the Toiler (1941)
- Blondie in Society (1941)
- Her First Beau (1941)
- Blondie Goes Latin (1941)
- Blondie Plays Cupid (1940)
- Pioneers of the West (1940)
- Saga of Death Valley (1939)
- Blondie Brings Up Baby (1939)
- Blondie Takes a Vacation (1939)
- Everybody's Baby (1939)
- Always in Trouble (1938)
- Passport Husband (1938)
- Safety in Numbers (1938)
- Walking Down Broadway (1938)
- Borrowing Trouble (1937)
- Checkers (1937)
- Hot Water (1937)
- Love in a Bungalow (1937)
- Dangerous Holiday (1937)
- Bulldog Edition (1936)
- Doughnuts and Society (1936)
- Condemned to Live (1935)
- Society Fever (1935)
- The Love Captive (1934)
- The Countess of Monte Cristo (1934)
