= Stanley Brown (actor) =

Canadian film actor

- Born: Stanley Dumond Brown; August 18, 1914; Calgary, Alberta, Canada
- Died: September 29, 2001 (aged 87); West Los Angeles, California, U.S.
- Education: University of California, Los Angeles
- Occupation: Film actor

Stanley Dumond Brown (August 18, 1914 – September 29, 2001), known professionally as Stanley Brown and Brad Taylor, was a Canadian film actor. He was best known for playing Ollie Shaw in the Blondie film series.

== Life and career ==
Brown was born in Calgary, Alberta. He attended the University of California, Los Angeles, graduating in 1936. He began his screen career in 1937, he appeared in the film Speed to Spare. In the same year, he appeared in the film Double or Nothing. In 1938, he appeared in the films Having Wonderful Time, You Can't Take It with You, The Colorado Trail, Juvenile Court, Girls' School, The Lady Objects, Adventure in Sahara, Blondie, Rio Grande and Smashing the Spy Ring.

Later in his career, Brown played Ollie Shaw in the Blondie films Blondie Meets the Boss, Blondie Plays Cupid, Blondie in Society, Blondie's Blessed Event, Footlight Glamour and It's a Great Life. In 1941, he starred as Harrison Carey in the film Harvard, Here I Come, starring along with Maxie Rosenbloom, Arline Judge, Marie Wilson and Don Beddoe. He appeared in numerous films such as The Man with Nine Lives, Bedtime Story, Redhead from Manhattan, Boston Blackie Goes Hollywood, Arizona, Blazing Six Shooters, I Was a Prisoner on Devil's Island, Confessions of Boston Blackie, The Fighting Buckaroo and Redhead from Manhattan.

Brown retired from acting in 1945, starring as Steve Ames in his final film Swingin' on a Rainbow, where he was credited as Brad Taylor.

== Death ==
Brown died on September 29, 2001, at the Nazareth House in West Los Angeles, California, at the age of 87. His body was cremated.
