= The First Hundred Years (film) =

1938 film by Richard Thorpe

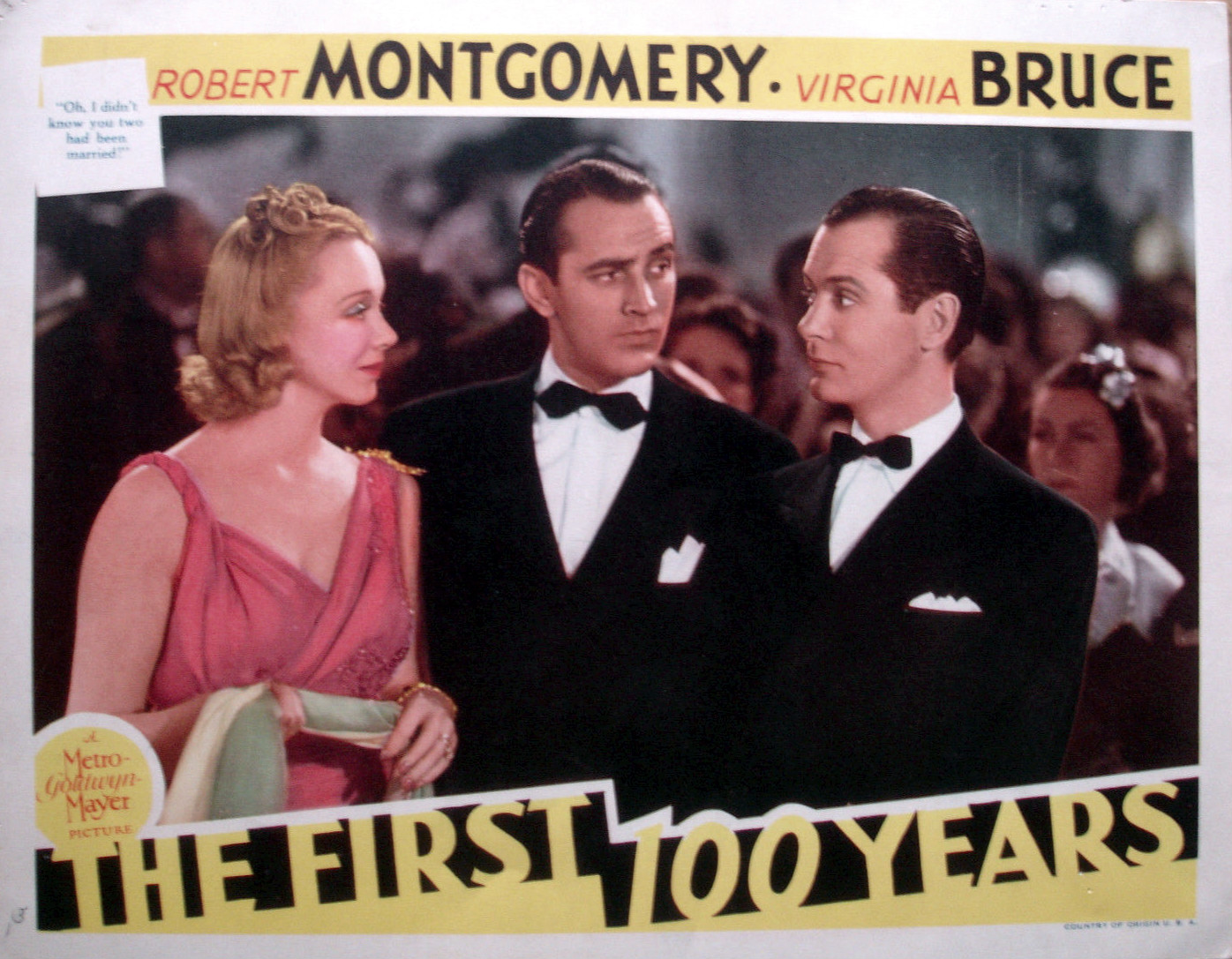
- Lobby card
- Directed by: Richard Thorpe
- Screenplay by: Melville Baker
- Story by: Norman Krasna
- Produced by: Norman Krasna
- Starring: Robert Montgomery; Virginia Bruce; Warren William
- Cinematography: Joseph Ruttenberg
- Edited by: Conrad A. Nervig
- Music by: William Axt
- Distributed by: Metro-Goldwyn-Mayer
- Release date: March 12, 1938 (United States)
- Running time: 73 minutes
- Country: United States
- Language: English

The First Hundred Years is a 1938 American comedy-drama film directed by Richard Thorpe. The film stars Robert Montgomery, Virginia Bruce, and Warren William.

== Cast ==
- Robert Montgomery as David Conway
- Virginia Bruce as Lynn Conway
- Warren William as Harry Borden
- Binnie Barnes as Claudia Weston
- Alan Dinehart as Samuel Z. Walker
- Harry Davenport as Uncle Dawson
- Nydia Westman as Midge
- Donald Briggs as William Regan
- Jonathan Hale as Judge Parker
- E. E. Clive as Chester Blascomb
- Lee Bowman as George Wallace
- Torben Meyer as Karl
- Bodil Rosing as Martha
- Irving Bacon as Wilkins
- Barbara Bedford as Sadie (uncredited)
