= Her First Beau =

1941 film directed by Theodore Reed

- Lobby card for the film
- Directed by: Theodore Reed
- Written by: Gladys Lehman; Karen DeWolf
- Based on: June Mad; 1939 play by Florence Ryerson and Colin Clements
- Produced by: B. B. Kahane
- Starring: Jane Withers; Jackie Cooper; Edith Fellows; Josephine Hutchinson; William Tracy; Martha O'Driscoll; Edgar Buchanan
- Cinematography: George Meehan
- Edited by: Charles Nelson
- Music by: M. W. Stoloff
- Production company: Columbia Pictures
- Distributed by: Columbia Pictures
- Release date: May 8, 1941 (US)
- Running time: 77 minutes
- Country: United States
- Language: English

Her First Beau is a 1941 American comedy drama film directed by Theodore Reed and starring Jane Withers, Jackie Cooper and Edith Fellows . The film was produced by Columbia Pictures, and the screenplay was written by Gladys Lehman and Karen DeWolf based on the 1939 play June Mad by Florence Ryerson and Colin Clements, which was adapted in turn from their 1930 novel This Awful Age.

== Plot ==
Fifteen-year-old Penelope "Penny" Woods dreams of being a writer, only she's concerned that she needs more life experience to work into her stories. She takes a liking to her uncle's friend Roger, a dashing but conceited college student who seems to have it all, and dreams of a big grown-up romance, but eventually his true colors are revealed. In the end, she realizes she'd rather spend time with her longtime friend Chuck, who's following his dream of being an aeronautical engineer.

== Cast ==
- Jane Withers as Penny Wood
- Jackie Cooper as Chuck Harris
- Edith Fellows as Milly Lou
- Josephine Hutchinson as Mrs. Wood
- William Tracy as Mervyn Roberts
- Martha O'Driscoll as Julie Harris
- Edgar Buchanan as Elmer Tuttle
- Una O'Connor as Effie
- Jonathan Hale as Mr. Harris
- Kenneth Howell as Roger Van Vleck
- Addison Richards as Tom Wood
