= Daring Young Man =

1942 film directed by Frank R. Strayer

- Theatrical poster for the film
- Directed by: Frank R. Strayer
- Written by: Karen DeWolf; Connie Lee
- Produced by: Robert Sparks
- Starring: Joe E. Brown; Marguerite Chapman; William Wright
- Cinematography: Franz F. Planer
- Edited by: Al Clark
- Music by: M. W. Stoloff; John Leipold
- Production company: Columbia Pictures
- Release date: October 8, 1942 (US)
- Running time: 73 minutes
- Country: United States
- Language: English

Daring Young Man is a 1942 American comedy film directed by Frank R. Strayer, which stars Joe E. Brown, Marguerite Chapman, and William Wright. Brown plays the dual roles of a failure turned champion bowler, Jonathan Peckinpaw, and his own grandmother. The original screenplay was written by Karen DeWolf and Connie Lee. The supporting cast features Claire Dodd, Lloyd Bridges, and a cameo appearance by Arthur Lake as Dagwood Bumstead.

== Plot ==
Jonathan Peckinpaw is a struggling proprietor of an air conditioning store. When his store is destroyed by an explosion in the shop next door, set off by Nazi spies, his failure is complete. He attempts to enlist in the Army, Navy, Marines, and Air Corps. Due to his lack of physical stature, he is refused by each service. His friend, the newspaper reporter Ann Minter, attempts to help him build up his physique by taking up bowling. However, he is terrible at it. Peckinpaw's grandmother is a die-hard gambler, and introduces her grandson to Sam Long, another gambler. Unbeknownst to everyone, Long has developed a sure fire way to cheat at bowling: a radio-controlled bowling ball. He claims to be able to teach Peckinpaw how to bowl in an incredibly short period of time. Using the radio-controlled ball, Peckinpaw becomes an overnight bowling phenomenon, and Long cleans up on the gambling activity betting against him.

The Nazi spies, Hans Mueller, Karl Rankin, and Marlene Frederick, who blew up the building next to Peckinpaw's store, are attempting to signal their counterparts offshore. However, something is interfering with their short wave signals. They discover that the interference is coming from the radio signals Long uses to control the bowling ball. They befriend Long and Peckinpaw, and use Long's radio to send coded messages to their comrades. The FBI tracks down the signals to the bowling alley, and attempt to capture the spies. In the confusion, the spies escape, but the radio-controlled ball is revealed. The FBI rushes off after the spies, and Long quietly slips away, leaving Peckinpaw alone to deal with a hostile crowd upset over the cheating scam. They attack him and send him to the hospital.

Minter visits him in the hospital, and despises him for the cheating scam. However, Peckinpaw convinces her that he knew nothing about the radio-controlled ball, and simply thought he was bowling well. Minter eventually believes him, and helps him escape from the hospital. He knows where the spies are hiding out, and gets them to chase him, leading them directly into the custody of the FBI. Right after the spies are arrested Peckinpaw receives his orders from the War Department, requesting that he report for duty.

== Cast ==
- Joe E. Brown as Jonathan Peckinpaw/Grandma
- Marguerite Chapman as Ann Minter
- William Wright as Sam Long
- Roger Clark as Ted Johnson
- Claire Dodd as Marlene Frederick
- Lloyd Bridges as Hans Mueller
- Don Douglas as Karl Rankin
- Frank Sully as Luke
- Eddie Laughton as Fogarty
- Robert Emmett Keane as Bowling alley manager)
- Robert Middlemass as Drummond
- Ben Carter as Pinky
- William Forrest as Bill White
- Charles Wagenheim as Fritz
- Arthur Lake as Dagwood Bumstead (cameo appearance)

== Production ==
The picture was originally titled Brownie, and production was announced in the beginning of June, naming Joe E. Brown as the star and Frank Strayer as the director. By the end of June Marguerite Chapman was announced as the female lead in the film, and the title was changed to Daring Young Man. Filming on the picture took place from June 24 - July 24, 1942. Shortly after filming began, it was revealed that Claire Dodd had joined the cast, and Robert Sparks was producing. Eddie Laughton was added to the cast in early July, as the stooge to Brown's character. Laughton had made a name for himself as a mime in vaudeville, and so had never uttered a word on stage. During the filming of Daring Young Man although he appeared in 85 scenes, he once again never had a word to utter in public. The production ran into difficulty using local bowling alleys to film in, as they were kept busy by off-duty defense workers. To alleviate the problem, the studio built its own bowling alley for the production. By the end of August it was announced that the cast included Joe E. Brown, Marguerite Chapman, Roger Clark, William Wright, Don Douglas, Claire Dodd, Lloyd Bridges, William Forrest, Eddie Laughton, Frank Sully, Ben Carter, and Robert Middlemass. The crew of Strayer as director, Sparks as producer, Abby Berlin as assistant director, Planer as cinematographer, Clark as editor, and Lodge Cunningham in charge of sound was also announced. On September 19 the release date was announced as October 8, The picture was released on that date. The Legion of Decency gave the film an "A-1" rating, meaning that it was suitable for all audiences.

== Reception ==
Harrison's Reports gave the film a good review, especially complimenting the performance of Joe E. Brown. They felt that while the film was "silly", it was very funny. The Motion Picture Herald did not like the film as much as Harrison's, feeling that only fans of Joe E. Brown would enjoy it. They felt the comedy routines were hackneyed, although they felt that the direction got as much out of the script and actors as it could.
