= Society Fever =

1935 film by Frank R. Strayer

- Directed by: Frank R. Strayer
- Written by: Karen DeWolf
- Produced by: Maury M. Cohen
- Starring: Lois Wilson; Lloyd Hughes; Hedda Hopper
- Cinematography: M.A. Anderson
- Edited by: Roland D. Reed
- Production company: Invincible Pictures
- Distributed by: Chesterfield Pictures
- Release date: June 23, 1935
- Running time: 66 minutes
- Country: United States
- Language: English

Society Fever is a 1935 American romantic comedy film directed by Frank R. Strayer and starring Lois Wilson, Lloyd Hughes and Hedda Hopper. The film entered the public domain in 1964, because its copyright was not renewed.

== Plot ==
A mother starts to get worried when she finds out that some wealthy friends have been invited to dinner with her somewhat screwball family.

== Cast ==
- Lois Wilson as Portia Prouty
- Lloyd Hughes as Graham Smith
- Hedda Hopper as Mrs. Vandergriff
- Guinn 'Big Boy' Williams as Edgar Prouty
- Grant Withers as Ronald Dawson
- Marion Shilling as Victoria Vandergriff
- George Irving as Mr. Vandergriff
- Sheila Terry as Lucy Prouty
- Maidel Turner as Mrs. Prouty
- Lois January as Julie Prouty
- Erville Alderson as Uncle Andy
- Kathryn Sheldon as Minnie
- Reginald Sheffield as Lord Michael
- Shirley Hill as Marjorie Vandergriff
- Lew Kelly as Hanly
- Anthony Marsh as Alan Prouty
- Richard Hemingway as Bob Miller
- Robert McKenzie as Bill Collector

== Bibliography ==
- Michael R. Pitts. Poverty Row Studios, 1929–1940: An Illustrated History of 55 Independent Film Companies, with a Filmography for Each. McFarland & Company, 2005.
