= Blondie Has Servant Trouble =

1940 film by Frank R. Strayer

- Directed by: Frank R. Strayer
- Written by: Richard Flournoy; Albert Duffy
- Based on: comic strip Blondie by Chic Young
- Produced by: Robert Sparks
- Starring: Penny Singleton; Arthur Lake
- Cinematography: Henry Freulich
- Edited by: Gene Havlick
- Music by: Leigh Harline
- Production company: King Features Syndicate
- Distributed by: Columbia Pictures
- Release date: July 25, 1940
- Running time: 70 minutes
- Country: United States
- Language: English

Blondie Has Servant Trouble is a 1940 American comedy film directed by Frank R. Strayer and starring Penny Singleton and Arthur Lake. It is sixth of the series of 28 Blondie movies.

== Plot summary ==
Blondie proves to be a real nuisance to her husband Dagwood and causes domestic disturbance in the Bumstead home, when she insists on getting a maid. Dagwood is forced to take the request seriously, and asks his boss, J.C. Dithers, for a raise. As a rule, Dithers refuses the raise, but instead he offers Dagwood and his family a two-week stay at a country house, complete with servants. The house is the size of a palace, formerly owned by Batterson, a newly deceased magician. With the consent of his wife, Dagwood accepts the offer, and they prepare for take off to the country.

They arrive at the empty house during a terrible thunderstorm, and find out from a local that the place definitely is haunted in some way. When they enter the house they realize that the house truly must be haunted, since it shows definite signs of a poltergeist living there with chairs starting to move around. A man named Horatio Jones is in fact responsible for the haunting by moving the chairs, covered by a white blanket. He has been ordered to do this as an initiation to a lodge he is trying to get membership in.

The haunting continues later in the night when two more persons, Anna and Eric Vaughn, arrive and pretends to be servants, and start a series of frightening events, like sliding panels and moving shadows. Later Anna and Horation disappear from the house, and Dagwood finds a newspaper clipping with a picture of Eric. He reads that his servant is responsible for plunging a knife into the back of an attorney, claiming that he stole Eric's inventions and gave them to Batterson, the former owner of the house. The clip also says that Eric claims to be the rightful heir to the estate and the house.

When Blondie hears about this she regrets that she asked for servants in the first place. Dagwood sets out to catch Eric, and succeeds just in time to prevent the man from stabbing his own wife Blondie in the back. When the press hears about the events that lead to Eric's capture, they name Dagwood a hero, and he finally gets his raise from his boss.

== Cast ==
- Penny Singleton as Blondie Bumstead
- Arthur Lake as Dagwood Bumstead
- Larry Simms as Baby Dumpling Bumstead
- Danny Mummert as Alvin Fuddle
- Jonathan Hale as J.C. Dithers
- Arthur Hohl as Eric Vaughn
- Esther Dale as Anna Vaughn
- Irving Bacon as Mr. Crumb, the Mailman
- Ray Turner as Horatio Jones
- Walter Soderling as Morgan
- Fay Helm as Mrs. Fuddle
