= Lady Be Careful =

1936 film by Theodore Reed

- Directed by: Theodore Reed
- Screenplay by: Dorothy Parker; Alan Campbell; Harry Ruskin
- Produced by: Theodore Reed
- Starring: Lew Ayres; Mary Carlisle; Benny Baker; Buster Crabbe; Grant Withers; Irving Bacon
- Cinematography: Henry Sharp
- Edited by: Hugh Bennett
- Music by: John Leipold
- Production company: Paramount Pictures
- Distributed by: Paramount Pictures
- Release date: September 4, 1936
- Running time: 72 minutes
- Country: United States
- Language: English

Lady Be Careful is a 1936 American drama film directed by Theodore Reed and written by Dorothy Parker, Alan Campbell, and Harry Ruskin, adapted from the play by Kenyon Nicholson and Charles Knox Robinson. The film stars Lew Ayres, Mary Carlisle, Benny Baker, Buster Crabbe, Grant Withers, and Irving Bacon. The film was released on September 4, 1936, by Paramount Pictures.

== Cast ==
- Lew Ayres as Chester aka Dynamite
- Mary Carlisle as Billie 'Stonewall' Jackson
- Benny Baker as Barney
- Buster Crabbe as Jake
- Grant Withers as Lt. Loomis
- Irving Bacon as Happy
- Barbara Barondess as Dode
- Sheila Bromley as Hazel
- Wilma Francis as Bernice
- Ethel Sykes as Dancer
- Murray Alper as Mattie
- Jack Chapin as Herb
- Wesley Barry as Texas
- Nick Lukats as Tim
- Purnell Pratt as Father
- Jack Adair as Sydney
- Josephine McKim as Alice
- Robert Cummings, as First Officer
- Jennifer Gray as Girl in Sailboat
- Bobbie Koshay as Girl in Sailboat
- Irene Bennett as Girl in Sailboat
- Ellen Drew as Girl in Sailboat
- Louise Stanley as Girl in Sailboat
