= Meet the Stewarts =

1942 film directed by Alfred E. Green

- Theatrical poster for the film
- Directed by: Alfred E. Green
- Screenplay by: Karen DeWolf
- Based on: Candy Takes a Job, a.k.a. Something Borrowed; 1941 Ladies' Home Journal by Elizabeth Dunn
- Produced by: Robert Sparks
- Starring: William Holden; Frances Dee
- Cinematography: Henry Freulich
- Edited by: Al Clark
- Music by: Leo Shuken; M. W. Stoloff
- Production company: Columbia Pictures
- Release date: May 28, 1942 (US)
- Running time: 73 minutes
- Country: United States
- Language: English

Meet the Stewarts is a 1942 American romantic comedy film directed by Alfred E. Green, which stars William Holden and Frances Dee. It was Holden's final film prior to his entering military service for World War II, and he was granted a temporary deferment in order to complete filming. The working title of the picture was Something Borrowed.

== Plot ==
A socialite accustomed to luxury has to live on her middle-class husband's salary.

== Cast ==
- William Holden as Michael "Mike" Stewart
- Frances Dee as Candace "Candy" Goodwin
- Grant Mitchell as Mr. [Pierce] Goodwin
- Marjorie Gateson as Mrs. Goodwin
- Anne Revere as Geraldine Stewart
- Roger Clark as Ted Graham
- Danny Mummert as John Goodwin
- Ann Gillis as Jane Goodwin
- Margaret Hamilton as Willametta
- Don Beddoe as Taxi driver
- Mary Gordon as Mrs. Stewart
- Edward Gargan as Moving man
- Tom Dugan as Moving man
