= The Big Guy =

1939 film by Arthur Lubin

- Directed by: Arthur Lubin
- Written by: Lester Cole
- Produced by: Burt Kelly
- Starring: Victor McLaglen; Jackie Cooper
- Cinematography: Elwood Bredell
- Edited by: Philip Cahn
- Music by: Hans J. Salter; Frank Skinner
- Production company: Universal Pictures
- Distributed by: Universal Pictures
- Release date: December 22, 1939 (United States)
- Running time: 78 minutes
- Country: United States
- Language: English

The Big Guy is a 1939 American drama crime film directed by Arthur Lubin starring Victor McLaglen and Jackie Cooper.

== Plot ==
A prison warden (Victor McLaglen) can either keep loot for his family or save an innocent youth (Jackie Cooper) condemned to die.

== Cast ==
- Victor McLaglen as Warden Bill Whitlock
- Jackie Cooper as Jimmy Hutchins
- Ona Munson as Mary Whitlock
- Peggy Moran as Joan Lawson
- Edward Brophy as Dippy
- Jonathan Hale as Jack Lang
- Russell Hicks as Lawson
- Wallis Clark as District Attorney
- Alan Davis as Joe
- Murray Alper as Williams
- Edward Pawley as Buckhart
- George McKay as Buzz Miller

== Production ==
Universal had been looking for a project to team Victor McLaglen and Jackie Cooper for some months. This was the script chosen. It was originally called No Power On Earth and it was announced in September 1939.

Filming started in October 1939 and ended in November. Lubin's work on the film got him the job of Black Friday which started shooting in December.
