= Big Town Girl =

1937 film by Alfred L. Werker

- Theatrical release poster
- Directed by: Alfred L. Werker
- Screenplay by: Lou Breslow; Robert Ellis; Helen Logan; John Patrick
- Story by: Frances Whiting Reid; Darrell Ware
- Produced by: Milton Feld
- Starring: Claire Trevor; Donald Woods; Alan Dinehart; Alan Baxter; Murray Alper; Spencer Charters
- Cinematography: Lucien N. Andriot
- Edited by: Hanson T. Fritch
- Production company: 20th Century Fox
- Distributed by: 20th Century Fox
- Release date: December 3, 1937
- Running time: 66 minutes
- Country: United States
- Language: English

Big Town Girl is a 1937 American drama film directed by Alfred L. Werker and written by Lou Breslow, Robert Ellis, Helen Logan and John Patrick. The film stars Claire Trevor, Donald Woods, Alan Dinehart, Alan Baxter, Murray Alper and Spencer Charters. The film was released on December 3, 1937, by 20th Century Fox.

== Plot ==
About to serve a 20-year prison sentence for a bank robbery, Jim Mead escapes. He tracks down estranged wife Peggy Melville, a singer, but she flees, moves to a new town and changes her name to Fay Loring, taking a job at a department store.

A publicist, Larry Edwards, overhears her singing in the store one day and thinks he can make her a star. He accidentally gets Fay fired, so she takes him up on his offer. Unwilling to show her face in public, for fear Mead will find her, Fay performs as the "Masked Countess," using a fake French accent.

Mark Tracey, a reporter, becomes determined to find out the masked woman's true identity. A stormy relationship develops between them. Mark prints a story with a photograph, and Mead recognizes a ring on the singer's finger.

When the reporter brings along an immigration official demanding to see the French countess's papers, Fay runs away. In a rural area she crashes her car. Mark, in pursuit, is asked at a gas station if he can give a ride to a "big town girl" who crashed her car. Without her mask, Fay is unrecognized by Mark. As romantic sparks develop between them, Mead turns up and the two men fight. The cops apprehend Mead just in time.

Back at the nightclub, the Masked Countess tries to kiss Mark, but he refuses. Fay, delighted by his loyalty, reveals herself to him at last.

== Cast ==
- Claire Trevor as Fay Loring
- Donald Woods as Mark Tracey
- Alan Dinehart as Larry Edwards
- Alan Baxter as James Mead
- Murray Alper as Marty
- Spencer Charters as Isaiah Wickenback
- Maurice Cass as Mr. Huff
- Irving Bacon as Gas Station Attendant
- George Chandler as Red Evans
- Lillian Yarbo as Scarlett (uncredited)
- Jonathan Hale as Hershell
- Ray Walker as Norton
