= Blondie's Blessed Event =

1942 film by Frank R. Strayer

- Film poster
- Directed by: Frank R. Strayer
- Screenplay by: Connie Lee; Karen DeWolf; Richard Flourney
- Based on: comic strip Blondie by Chic Young
- Produced by: Robert Sparks
- Starring: Penny Singleton; Arthur Lake; Larry Simms
- Cinematography: Henry Freulich
- Edited by: Charles Nelson
- Music by: John Leipold
- Production company: King Features Syndicate
- Distributed by: Columbia Pictures
- Release date: April 9, 1942
- Running time: 69 minutes
- Country: United States
- Language: English

Blondie's Blessed Event is a 1942 American comedy film directed by Frank R. Strayer and starring Penny Singleton, Arthur Lake, and Larry Simms. It is the 11th of the Blondie films. It was the first to feature the character of Cookie.

== Plot ==
Blondie gives birth to a baby daughter, Cookie, at the hospital. Dagwood is clumsy at doing housework in her absence. He is then sent to Chicago to attend an architects convention, where he meets an eccentric but impoverished hotel-room neighbor. The man claims to be a playwright and mooches Dagwood's meal while writing a speech, which Dagwood then delivers at the convention. Unfortunately, the speech urges homeowners to design their own homes rather than hire architects. The man follows Dagwood home and takes over the running of their household, including hiring a maid, and browbeating Mr. Dithers into giving Dagwood a raise. Blondie finally demands that he leave.

== Cast ==
- Penny Singleton as Blondie
- Arthur Lake as Dagwood
- Larry Simms as Baby Dumpling
- Daisy as Daisy the Dog
- Jonathan Hale as J.C. Dithers
- Danny Mummert as Alvin Fuddle
- Hans Conried as George Wickley
- Stanley Brown as Ollie Shaw
- Irving Brown as Mr. Crumb
- Mary Wickes as Sarah Miller
- Norma Jean Wayne as Cookie (uncredited)
