= Passport Husband =

1938 film by James Tinling

- Directed by: James Tinling
- Screenplay by: Karen DeWolf; Robert Chapin
- Story by: Hilda Stone
- Produced by: Sol M. Wurtzel
- Starring: Stuart Erwin; Pauline Moore; Douglas Fowley; Joan Woodbury; Robert Lowery; Harold Huber
- Cinematography: Edward Snyder
- Edited by: Nick DeMaggio
- Production company: 20th Century Fox
- Distributed by: 20th Century Fox
- Release date: July 15, 1938
- Running time: 72 minutes
- Country: United States
- Language: English

Passport Husband is a 1938 American comedy film directed by James Tinling and written by Karen DeWolf and Robert Chapin. The film stars Stuart Erwin, Pauline Moore, Douglas Fowley, Joan Woodbury, Robert Lowery and Harold Huber. The film was released on July 15, 1938, by 20th Century Fox.

== Plot ==
Conchita Montez is a beauty from South America, but is being pursued by some gangsters and in risk of getting deported, so she makes the moves on Henry, a waiter who's in love with her and quickly marries him.

== Cast ==
- Stuart Erwin as Henry Cabot
- Pauline Moore as Mary Jane Clayton
- Douglas Fowley as Tiger Martin
- Joan Woodbury as Conchita Montez
- Robert Lowery as Ted Markson
- Harold Huber as Blackie Bennet
- Edward Brophy as Spike
- Paul McVey as H.C. Walton
- Lon Chaney Jr. as Bull
- Joe Sawyer as Duke Selton
