= Dagwood Bumstead =

- Dagwood Bumstead and his Dagwood sandwich

Publication information
- Publisher: King Features Syndicate
- First appearance: September 8, 1930
- Created by: Chic Young

Dagwood Bumstead is a main character in cartoonist Chic Young's long-running comic strip Blondie. He debuted in the first strip on September 8, 1930.

He was originally heir to the Bumstead Locomotive fortune, but was disowned when he married the title character Blondie née Boopadoop, a flapper whom his family saw as below his class. He has since worked hard at J. C. Dithers Construction Company as office manager to support his family. The Bumsteads' first baby, Alexander, was originally named Baby Dumpling. The name of his daughter, Cookie, was chosen by readers in a national contest. The family circle is rounded out by Daisy the dog. The origin of both Dagwood's last name and Daisy's name came from Chic Young's long-time friend Arthur Bumstead and his dog, Daisy.

== Characteristics ==
His favorite things in life include his wife Blondie, his kids, naps on the sofa, long baths, and food. Dagwood is famous for concocting tall, multilayered sandwiches topped with an olive on a toothpick, and the term "Dagwood sandwich" has entered American English. Dagwood often made these sandwiches late at night.

Dagwood frequently has problems with door-to-door salesmen, rude telemarketers and store salespeople, crashing into the mailman (Mr. Beasley) as he rushes from home, getting ready before the carpool leaves without him, getting to work on time, his boss J. C. Dithers, and Cookie's many dates. He is often suspicious of her dates and keeps a close watch on them when they come to the house. Other characters in his universe include Elmo Tuttle, a pesky little neighborhood kid who wanders in and out of the Bumstead house; next-door neighbors Herb and Tootsie Woodley; Lou, the sarcastic cook in a local diner; and Mr. Dithers' domineering wife, Cora. Dagwood's birthday is July 20, or April 21, or February 15.

== Appearances in other media ==
Over the years, Dagwood has appeared not only in daily newspapers, but also in comic books, Big Little Books, Whitman novels for children and other print materials, as well as radio, film, and television. Arthur Lake played Dagwood in the Blondie film series (1938–50), radio series and the short-lived 1957 TV series. Hal Le Roy portrayed Dagwood in the pilot for the 1957 series. Will Hutchins played him in the 1968 TV series. He made several cameo appearances in Garfield Gets Real, alongside Grimmy from Mother Goose and Grimm. Dagwood and his wife also made a cameo appearance in a Garfield strip originally published on April 1, 1997. In a fourth wall break, Garfield refers to this as "moving to a different comic strip" as part of the comic strip switcheroo that day, which also saw Garfield make a cameo in that day's Blondie strip. Dagwood made another appearance in Garfield comic strips on August 20, 2005, to invite Jon and Garfield for Blondie and his anniversary party.

Dagwood also made a cameo appearance in the 1946 cartoon Hollywood Canine Canteen, where his wife Blondie and he (named Dogwood in this short) are portrayed as anthropomorphic dogs working in a snack bar. Sara Berner and Paul Corley voiced these characters, respectively.

In the song "Homemade Mummy", alternative rapper Aesop Rock briefly refers to Dagwood.
