= Henry Freulich =

American cinematographer (1906–85)

- Born: April 14, 1906; New York City, United States
- Died: December 4, 1985 (aged 79); Los Angeles, California, United States
- Occupation: Cinematographer
- Spouse: Kay Harris

Henry Freulich (April 14, 1906 – December 4, 1985) was an American cinematographer for 31 years. He was married to the actress Kay Harris.

== Early life and career ==
Freulich was born in New York City, the son of photographer Jacob "Jack" Freulich, 1880-1936. He began his career as a cameraman with Lon Chaney's The Hunchback of Notre Dame in 1922.

While at Columbia Pictures in 1934, he was cinematographer for It Happened One Night with Clark Gable and Claudette Colbert. He worked on over a hundred Three Stooges films. In 1963, he shot a record (which he shared with Harry Neumann) 11 films. He worked in television later in his career. His career continued until 1969.

== Death ==
Freulich died in Los Angeles, California, on December 4, 1985.

== Partial filmography ==
- Men of the Night (1934)
- That's Gratitude (1934)
- Behind the Evidence (1935)
- One Way Ticket (1935)
- The Lone Wolf Returns (1935)
- Unknown Woman (1935)
- Meet Nero Wolfe (1936)
- Shakedown (1936)
- It's All Yours (1937)
- Murder in Greenwich Village (1937)
- Good Girls Go to Paris (1939)
- Blondie Takes a Vacation (1939)
- The Lone Wolf Strikes (1940)
- Tillie the Toiler (1941)
- Meet the Stewarts (1942)
- Stand By All Networks (1942)
- The Son of Rusty (1947)
- Sport of Kings (1947)
- Mr. District Attorney (1947)
- Thunderhoof (1948)
- Law of the Barbary Coast (1949)
- Kazan (1949)
- Not Wanted (1949)
- Rusty Saves a Life (1949)
- Prison Warden (1949)
- The Iroquois Trail (1950)
- Corky of Gasoline Alley (1951)
- Bonanza Town (1951)
- The Miami Story (1954)
- New Orleans Uncensored (1955)
- Chicago Syndicate (1955)
- Inside Detroit (1956)
- Reprisal! (1956)
- The Houston Story (1956)
- Return to Warbow (1958)

== See also ==
- List of cinematographers
- List of people from New York
