= Tillie the Toiler (disambiguation) =

Tillie the Toiler is a newspaper comic strip created by cartoonist Russ Westover.

Tillie the Toiler may refer to:

- Tillie the Toiler (1927 film), American silent comedy film directed by Hobart Henley
- Tillie the Toiler (1941 film), American comedy directed by Sidney Salkow
