= Shirley Patterson =

Canadian-born actress (1922–1995)

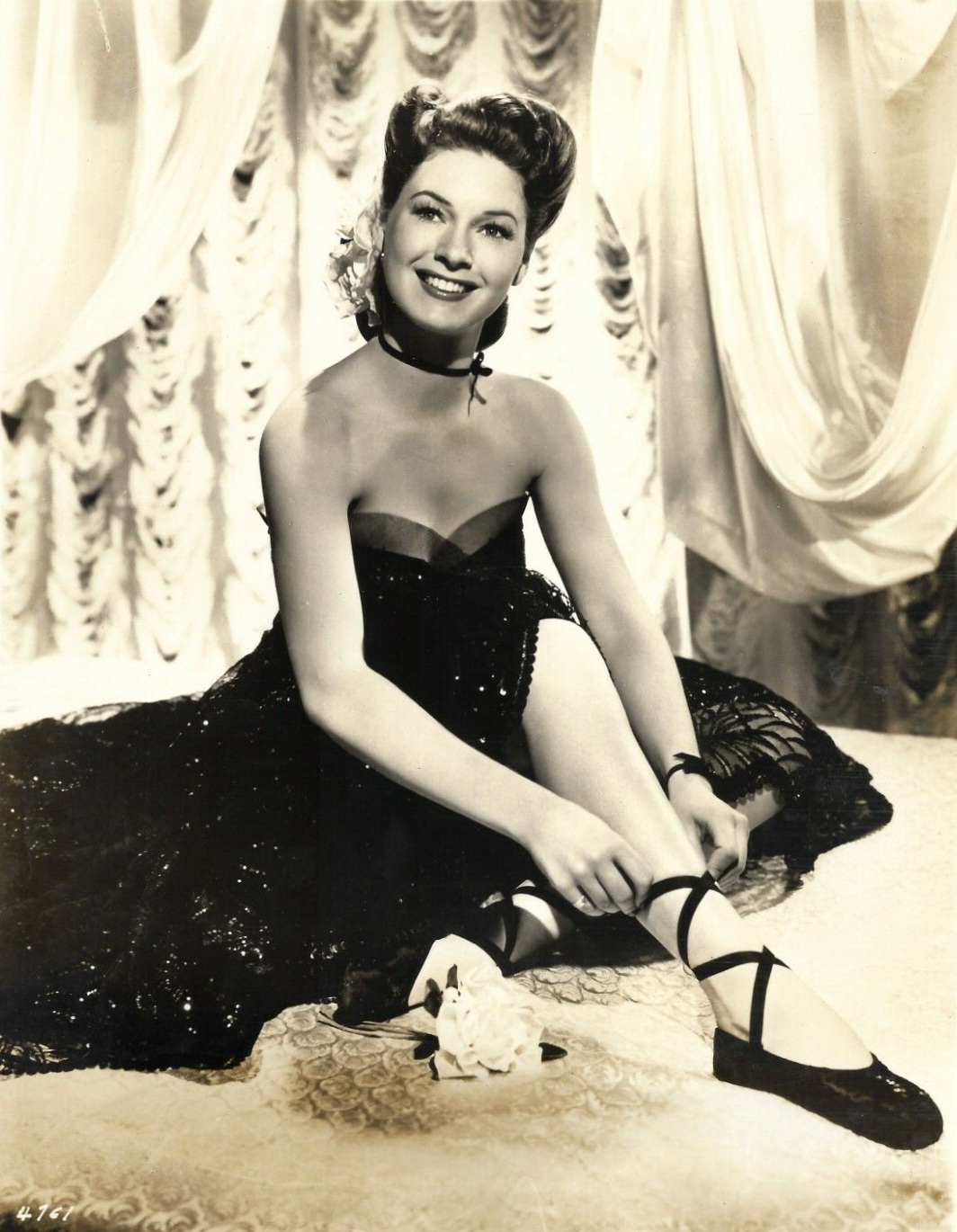
- Shirley Patterson in the 1940s
- Born: Shirley Gladys Patterson; December 26, 1922; Winnipeg, Manitoba, Canada
- Died: April 4, 1995 (aged 72); Pompano Beach, Florida, U.S.
- Other names: Shawn Smith
- Occupations: Film, television actress
- Years active: 1942–1959
- Spouse(s): Alfred Fuller Smith, Jr. (m. 1947; div. 1971); John Laurence Bodette (m. 1979)
- Children: Alfred F. Smith III

Shirley Gladys Patterson (December 26, 1922 – April 4, 1995), sometimes billed as Shawn Smith, was a Canadian-born B-movie actress of the 1940s and 1950s.

== Early years ==
Born on December 26, 1922, in Winnipeg, Canada, Patterson grew up in Eastend, Saskatchewan. She was the daughter of druggist Benjamin Patterson. The family moved to Los Angeles because of her father's health problems, and she finished her education there.

== Career ==
Patterson began her acting career after being a beauty contestant in pageants in California from 1939 to 1940. In 1940, she won the Miss California Pageant, making a total of 15 contest victories. She was disqualified later when it was found she was underage. The second-place contestant (Rosemary LaPlanche) won the Miss America Pageant in 1941.

She signed a contract with Columbia Pictures after a talent scout saw her perform in a little theater production. Her career spanned 40 films, a few television appearances, and a serial.

Patterson played the role of heroine, Linda Page, in the 1943 15-chapter Batman serial. In 1944, she starred in The Vigilantes Ride with Russell Hayden and Bob Wills. In 1946, she accompanied Eddie Dean and Roscoe Ates in the movie Driftin River, and starred with them again the same year in Tumbleweed Trail, as well as Stars Over Texas. She also was Dean's object of affection in the song "Let's Go Sparkin'" from the 1947 movie Black Hills.

Patterson played Poppea, Nero's consort, in a nonspeaking role in The Silver Chalice (1954). Two of her last films were the 1957 movie The Land Unknown and the 1958 science-fiction movie It! The Terror from Beyond Space. Shortly after the close of filming in 1958 while skiing at Lake Arrowhead, California, she suffered a severely broken leg. She was in a full leg cast for a year and then a half cast for another six months, effectively ending her acting career.

== Personal life and death ==
From September 10, 1947 until their divorce in February 1971, Patterson was married to Alfred Fuller Smith, Jr. They had one child, Alfred F. Smith III (nickname,”Tory”). In April 1979, she married John Laurence Bodette.

On April 4, 1995, at age 72, following a long battle with cancer, Patterson died at Hospice House, North Broward Medical Center (located in Pompano Beach, Florida), where she had been brought from her home in nearby Fort Lauderdale. She was survived by Bodette, by her son Alfred Smith III, and by four stepsons from her second marriage.

== Filmography ==
Year	Title	Role	Notes
1942	North of the Rockies	Lydia Rogers	
1942	They All Kissed the Bride	Receptionist	Uncredited
1942	Riders of the Northland	Sheila Taylor	
1942	Parachute Nurse	Katherine Webb	
1942	Sabotage Squad	Miss Cole	Uncredited
1942	A Man's World	Nurse Bentley	Uncredited
1942	Lucky Legs	Chambermaid	Uncredited
1942	The Spirit of Stanford	June Rogers	
1942	Riding Through Nevada	Gail Holloway	
1942	Boston Blackie Goes Hollywood	Stewardess	Uncredited
1942	Laugh Your Blues Away	Mrs. Knox	Uncredited
1943	Spook Louder	Perkins	Uncredited
1943	Let's Have Fun	Girl	Uncredited
1943	Redhead from Manhattan	Telephone Operator	Uncredited
1943	The More the Merrier	Girl	Uncredited
1943	Law of the Northwest	Michele Darcy	
1943	Good Luck, Mr. Yates	Secretary	Uncredited
1943	Batman	Linda Page	Serial
1943	Destroyer	Bigbee's Girl	Uncredited
1943	Dangerous Blondes	Bride	Uncredited
1943	My Kingdom for a Cook	Elevator Girl	Uncredited
1943	The Texas Kid	Nancy Drew	
1943	Klondike Kate	Dancer	Uncredited
1943	The Vigilantes Ride	Jane Andrews	Uncredited
1944	Riding West	Alice Morton	
1944	Marriage Is a Private Affair	Mary Saunders	
1945	Keep Your Powder Dry	WAC Brooks	
1945	Between Two Women	Nurse Thorsen	
1946	The Harvey Girls	Harvey Girl	Uncredited
1946	Tumbleweed Trail	Robin Ryan	
1946	Driftin' River	J. C. 'Jenny' Morgan	
1946	Stars Over Texas	Terry Lawrence	
1947	Black Hills	Janet Hadley	
1953	Second Chance		Uncredited
1953	The French Line	Model	Uncredited
1954	The Long Wait	Carol Shay	
1954	The Silver Chalice	Poppaea	Uncredited
1955	The Shrike	Celia Johns	Uncredited
1956	The Bottom of the Bottle	Gossipy Woman	Uncredited
1956	World Without End	Elaine	
1957	The Land Unknown	Margaret Hathaway	
1958	It! The Terror from Beyond Space	Ann Anderson	
