= Bad Men of the Hills =

1942 film by William Berke

- Theatrical release poster
- Directed by: William Berke
- Screenplay by: Luci Ward
- Produced by: Jack Fier
- Starring: Charles Starrett; Russell Hayden; Cliff Edwards; Luana Walters; Alan Bridge; Guy Usher
- Cinematography: Benjamin H. Kline
- Edited by: Richard Fantl
- Production company: Columbia Pictures
- Distributed by: Columbia Pictures
- Release date: August 13, 1942
- Running time: 58 minutes
- Country: United States
- Language: English

Bad Men of the Hills is a 1942 American Western film directed by William Berke and written by Luci Ward. The film stars Charles Starrett, Russell Hayden, Cliff Edwards, Luana Walters, Alan Bridge and Guy Usher. The film was released on August 13, 1942, by Columbia Pictures.

== Cast ==
- Charles Starrett as Steve Carlton
- Russell Hayden as Lucky Shelton
- Cliff Edwards as Harmony Haines
- Luana Walters as Laurie Bishop
- Alan Bridge as Sheriff Mace Arnold
- Guy Usher as Doctor Jed Mitchell
- Joel Friedkin as Judge Sam Malotte
- Buckie Tibbs as Buckshot Bishop
- John Shay as Marshal Dave Upjohn
- Dick Botiller as Deputy Brant
