= Riders of the Northland =

1942 film by William Berke

- Theatrical release poster
- Directed by: William Berke
- Screenplay by: Paul Franklin
- Produced by: Jack Fier
- Starring: Charles Starrett; Russell Hayden; Shirley Patterson; Cliff Edwards; Bobby Larson; Lloyd Bridges
- Cinematography: Benjamin H. Kline
- Edited by: Burton Kramer
- Production company: Columbia Pictures
- Distributed by: Columbia Pictures
- Release date: June 18, 1942
- Running time: 58 minutes
- Country: United States
- Language: English

Riders of the Northland is a 1942 American Western film directed by William Berke and written by Paul Franklin. The film stars Charles Starrett, Russell Hayden, Shirley Patterson, Cliff Edwards, Bobby Larson and Lloyd Bridges. The film was released on June 18, 1942, by Columbia Pictures.

== Cast ==
- Charles Starrett as Steve Bowie
- Russell Hayden as Lucky Laidlaw
- Shirley Patterson as Sheila Taylor
- Cliff Edwards as Harmony Bumpas
- Bobby Larson as Buddy Taylor
- Lloyd Bridges as Alex
- Kenneth MacDonald as Matt Taylor
- Paul Sutton as Chris Larsen
- Rudolph Anders as Nazi Agent
- Joe McGuinn as Stacy
- Francis Walker as Dobie
- George Piltz as Luke
