= Law of the Northwest =

1943 film by William Berke

- Directed by: William Berke
- Written by: Luci Ward
- Produced by: Jack Fier
- Starring: Charles Starrett; Shirley Patterson; Arthur Hunnicutt
- Cinematography: Benjamin H. Kline
- Edited by: Jerome Thoms
- Music by: Morris Stoloff
- Production company: Columbia Pictures
- Distributed by: Columbia Pictures
- Release date: May 27, 1943
- Running time: 57 minutes
- Country: United States
- Language: English

Law of the Northwest is a 1943 American Western film directed by William Berke and starring Charles Starrett, Shirley Patterson and Arthur Hunnicutt.

== Cast ==
- Charles Starrett as Steve King
- Shirley Patterson as Michele Darcy
- Arthur Hunnicutt as Arkansas
- Stanley Brown as Neal Clayton
- Davison Clark as Tom Clayton
- Johnny Mitchell as Paul Darcy
- Donald Curtis as Frank Mason
- Douglas Leavitt as George Bradley
- Reginald Barlow as Jean Darcy
- John Tyrrell as Spokesman
- John Shay as Mayo
- Ed Cassidy as Biddle
- Eddie Laughton as Patton
- Al Boles as Henchman
- Chuck Baldra as Henchman

== Bibliography ==
- Pitts, Michael R. Western Movies: A Guide to 5,105 Feature Films. McFarland, 2012.
