= Smith of Minnesota =

1942 film by Lew Landers

- Smith of Minnesota DVD
- Directed by: Lew Landers
- Screenplay by: Robert Hardy Andrews
- Produced by: Jack Fier
- Starring: Bruce Smith; Arline Judge; Warren Ashe; Don Beddoe; Kay Harris; Robert Kellard
- Cinematography: Philip Tannura
- Edited by: Mel Thorsen
- Production company: Columbia Pictures
- Distributed by: Columbia Pictures
- Release date: October 15, 1942
- Running time: 66 minutes
- Country: United States
- Language: English

Smith of Minnesota is a 1942 American drama film directed by Lew Landers and written by Robert Hardy Andrews. The film stars Bruce Smith, Arline Judge, Warren Ashe, Don Beddoe, Kay Harris and Robert Kellard. The film was released on October 15, 1942, by Columbia Pictures. It is based on University of Minnesota football player Bruce Smith, who won the Heisman Trophy in 1941 and who plays himself in this film.

== Cast ==
- Bruce Smith as Himself
- Arline Judge as Gwyn Allen
- Warren Ashe as Charles Hardy
- Don Beddoe as Lew Smith
- Kay Harris as Olive Smith
- Robert Kellard as George Smith
- Roberta Smith as June Smith
- Rosemary DeCamp as Mrs. Smith
- Maurice Murphy as Wayne Smith
- Dick Hogan as Gibby Dapper
- Douglas Leavitt as Gus Boosalis
- Alma Carroll as Edith
- Edward Earle as Bill Glaser
- Kenneth MacDonald as Doc Williams
- Paul McVey as Coach
- Addison Richards as Edward Northrup
- Joel Friedkin as Kiekenapp
- Harry Harvey Jr. as Young Bruce
- Schuyler Standish as Young George
