= Hail to the Rangers =

1943 film

- Theatrical release poster
- Directed by: William Berke
- Screenplay by: Gerald Geraghty
- Produced by: Jack Fier
- Starring: Charles Starrett; Arthur Hunnicutt; Robert Owen Atcher; Leota Atcher; Norman Willis; Lloyd Bridges
- Cinematography: Benjamin H. Kline
- Edited by: William F. Claxton
- Production company: Columbia Pictures
- Distributed by: Columbia Pictures
- Release date: September 15, 1943
- Running time: 58 minutes
- Country: United States
- Language: English

Hail to the Rangers is a 1943 American Western film directed by William Berke and written by Gerald Geraghty. The film stars Charles Starrett, Arthur Hunnicutt, Robert Owen Atcher, Leota Atcher, Norman Willis and Lloyd Bridges. The film was released on September 15, 1943, by Columbia Pictures.

== Cast ==
- Charles Starrett as Steve McKay
- Arthur Hunnicutt as Arkansas
- Robert Owen Atcher as Bob Atcher
- Leota Atcher as Bonnie Montgomery
- Norman Willis as Monte Kerlin
- Lloyd Bridges as Dave Kerlin
- Ted Adams as Sam Schuyler
- Ernie Adams as Latham
- Tom London as Jessup
- Davison Clark as Maj. Montgomery
- Jack Kirk as Sheriff Ward
- Dick Botiller as Tobin
