= The Fighting Buckaroo =

1943 film by William Berke

- Directed by: William Berke
- Written by: Luci Ward
- Produced by: Jack Fier
- Starring: Charles Starrett; Kay Harris; Arthur Hunnicutt
- Cinematography: Benjamin H. Kline
- Edited by: William F. Claxton
- Production company: Columbia Pictures
- Distributed by: Columbia Pictures
- Release date: February 1, 1943
- Running time: 58 minutes
- Country: United States
- Language: English

The Fighting Buckaroo is a 1943 American Western film directed by William Berke and starring Charles Starrett, Kay Harris and Arthur Hunnicutt.

== Plot ==
McBride is a widower raising an active little girl on a cattle ranch that is badly in need of fresh business.he is also an ex-convict threatened with blackmail by The Thatcher Brothers if he doesn't return to their organization. Musical ranch hand Ernie sends for Steve Harrison,the former Texas Ranger who arrested McBride but also spoke up for him at his trial and got him a light sentence.Harrison and his laconic sidekick Arkansas arrive and discover "the same old trouble. People trying to get something for nothing".

The Thatcher's have launched a reign of hijacking,fire and terror---and McBride's prospective father-in-law,Comstock,is quick to blame McBride as being the rustler's "inside man".McBride flees an arrest attempt,adding to the presumption of h is guilt.

But Comstock himself,the head of the Cattleman's Association,is the inside man.His daughter Carol turns against him when she discovers this.

While the gang is off on a raid,an honest and well-armed posse enters their "impregnable" hideout and uses its construction against them when t hey return. When their leader Sam Thatcher is shot dead, the rest of the gang surrenders. McBride and Carol are married and Harrison rides off into the sunset.

== Cast ==
- Charles Starrett as Steve Harrison
- Kay Harris as Carol Comstock
- Arthur Hunnicutt as Arkansas
- Ernest Tubb as Ernie ---who sings four songs,including "Walking The Floor Over You",one of his most well-known.
- Johnny Luther's Ranch Boys as Cowhands & Musicians
- Wheeler Oakman as Sam Thatcher

== Bibliography ==
- Pitts, Michael R. Western Movies: A Guide to 5,105 Feature Films. McFarland, 2012.
