= Robin Hood of the Range =

1943 film by William Berke

- Theatrical release poster
- Directed by: William Berke
- Screenplay by: Betty Burbridge
- Story by: Betty Burbridge
- Produced by: Jack Fier
- Starring: Charles Starrett; Arthur Hunnicutt; Kay Harris; Kenneth MacDonald; Johnny Mitchell; Hal Price
- Cinematography: Benjamin H. Kline
- Edited by: Jerome Thoms
- Production company: Columbia Pictures
- Distributed by: Columbia Pictures
- Release date: July 29, 1943
- Running time: 54 minutes
- Country: United States
- Language: English

Robin Hood of the Range is a 1943 American Western film directed by William Berke and written by Betty Burbridge. The film stars Charles Starrett, Arthur Hunnicutt, Kay Harris, Kenneth MacDonald, Johnny Mitchell and Hal Price. The film was released on July 29, 1943, by Columbia Pictures.

== Cast ==
- Charles Starrett as Steve Marlowe
- Arthur Hunnicutt as Arkansas
- Kay Harris as Julie Marlowe
- Kenneth MacDonald as Henry Marlowe
- Johnny Mitchell as Ned Harding
- Hal Price as Sheriff
- Edward Peil Sr. as Grady
- Frank LaRue as Carter
- Bud Osborne as Thompson
- Stanley Brown as Santana
- Jimmy Wakely as Jimmy
- Johnny Bond as Johnny
- Scotty Harrel as Scotty
