= Riding Through Nevada =

1942 film by William Berke

- Directed by: William Berke
- Screenplay by: Gerald Geraghty
- Produced by: Jack Fier
- Starring: Charles Starrett; Shirley Patterson; Arthur Hunnicutt; Jimmie Davis; Clancy Cooper; Davison Clark
- Cinematography: Benjamin H. Kline
- Edited by: Burton Kramer
- Production company: Columbia Pictures
- Distributed by: Columbia Pictures
- Release date: November 2, 1942
- Running time: 58 minutes
- Country: United States
- Language: English

Riding Through Nevada is a 1942 American Western film directed by William Berke and written by Gerald Geraghty. The film stars Charles Starrett, Shirley Patterson, Arthur Hunnicutt, Jimmie Davis, Clancy Cooper and Davison Clark. The film was released on November 2, 1942, by Columbia Pictures.

== Cast ==
- Charles Starrett as Steve Lowrey
- Shirley Patterson as Gail Holloway
- Arthur Hunnicutt as Arkansas
- Jimmie Davis as Jimmie Davis
- Clancy Cooper as Ed Kendall
- Davison Clark as Bob Holloway
- Minerva Urecal as Widow Humbolt
- Edmund Cobb as Sheriff
- Ethan Laidlaw as Woods
- Art Mix as Burgess
- Stanley Brown as Hotel Clerk
