= Frontier Fury =

Frontier Fury may refer to:

== Film ==
- The Lone Rider in Frontier Fury, a 1941 entry in the Lone Rider series of Westerns
- Frontier Fury, a 1943 Charles Starrett Western

== Literature ==
- Frontier Fury, a 1992 Will Henry Western novel
- Frontier Fury, a 2010 entry in The Executioner series of novels
