= Tillie the Toiler =

Comic strip by Russ Westover (1921–1959)

- Author(s): Russ Westover
- Launch date: January 3, 1921
- End date: March 15, 1959
- Syndicate(s): King Features Syndicate

This 1939 Russ Westover page was reprinted in the Dell Four Color Comic Tillie the Toiler #22.

Tillie the Toiler is a newspaper comic strip created by cartoonist Russ Westover who initially worked on his concept of a flapper character in a strip he titled Rose of the Office. With a title change, it sold to King Features Syndicate which carried the strip from January 3, 1921, to March 15, 1959.

The daily strip began on Monday, January 3, 1921, followed by the Sunday page on October 10, 1922.

Westover retired in 1951 with his assistant Bob Gustafson then doing most of the writing and drawing. After Westover departed completely three years later, Gustafson's signature appeared on the strip beginning October 4, 1954. The daily strip ended March 7, 1959, with the last Sunday eight days later on March 15.

== Characters and story ==
Stylish working girl Tillie was employed as a stenographer, secretary and part-time model. An attractive brunette, she had no problem finding men to escort her around town. Comics historian Don Markstein described the story situations:

Tillie (last name Jones) toiled for a fashionable women's wear company run by clothing mogul J. Simpkins. Or usually did, anyway—she'd occasionally quit or be fired, as the plotline, which ran at breakneck pace and didn't always make perfect sense, required. During World War II, in fact, she even joined the U.S. Army. But she always came back to Simpkins. Mostly, she worked in his office, but she also did a little modeling. Whatever she did and wherever she went, however, she was impeccably dressed in the very latest styles. (Except when she was in the army, of course.) This helped her in the pursuit of charming and often wealthy young men, who came and went at an alarming rate, providing grist for the story mill. She did, however, have one steady male associate, Clarence "Mac" MacDougall, a short, bulb-nosed co-worker who loved her persistently even though she returned little of the feeling.

== Toppers ==
For the Sunday page, Westover produced a series of topper strips, starting with Kitty Change-Her-Mind (Jan 10–March 14, 1926) and The Counter Kids (March 21–May 2, 1926).

On May 9, 1926, Westover began a topper series that would run for two decades – first called The Van Zippers (May 9–Aug 15, 1926), then The Van Swaggers (Aug 22, 1926 – June 26, 1938) and finally The Van Swaggers Starring Aunt Min (July 3, 1938 – 1943?)

A paper-doll panel, Tillie the Toiler's Fashion Parade, appeared next to the topper from April 24, 1932, until 1951.

== Reprints ==
Cupples & Leon collected the strips into book form in 1925, followed by seven other books in that series. Dell Comics reprinted the strip in 14 issues between 1941 and 1949. Tillie the Toiler and the Masquerading Duchess was a novel published by Whitman in 1943.

== Films ==
The comic strip inspired two films of the same name: Tillie the Toiler (1927), a silent film with Marion Davies in the title role, and Tillie the Toiler (1941), starring Kay Harris.

== Radio ==
The comic strip was also the basis for a short-lived radio series, also titled Tillie the Toiler. The series featured Caryl Smith as Tillie, with Billy Lynn as Mac MacDougal, John Brown as Simpkins and Margaret Burlen as Tillie's mother. The show ran on CBS Radio from April 11 to October 10, 1942.
