= Donald Murphy (actor) =

American actor (1918–2008)

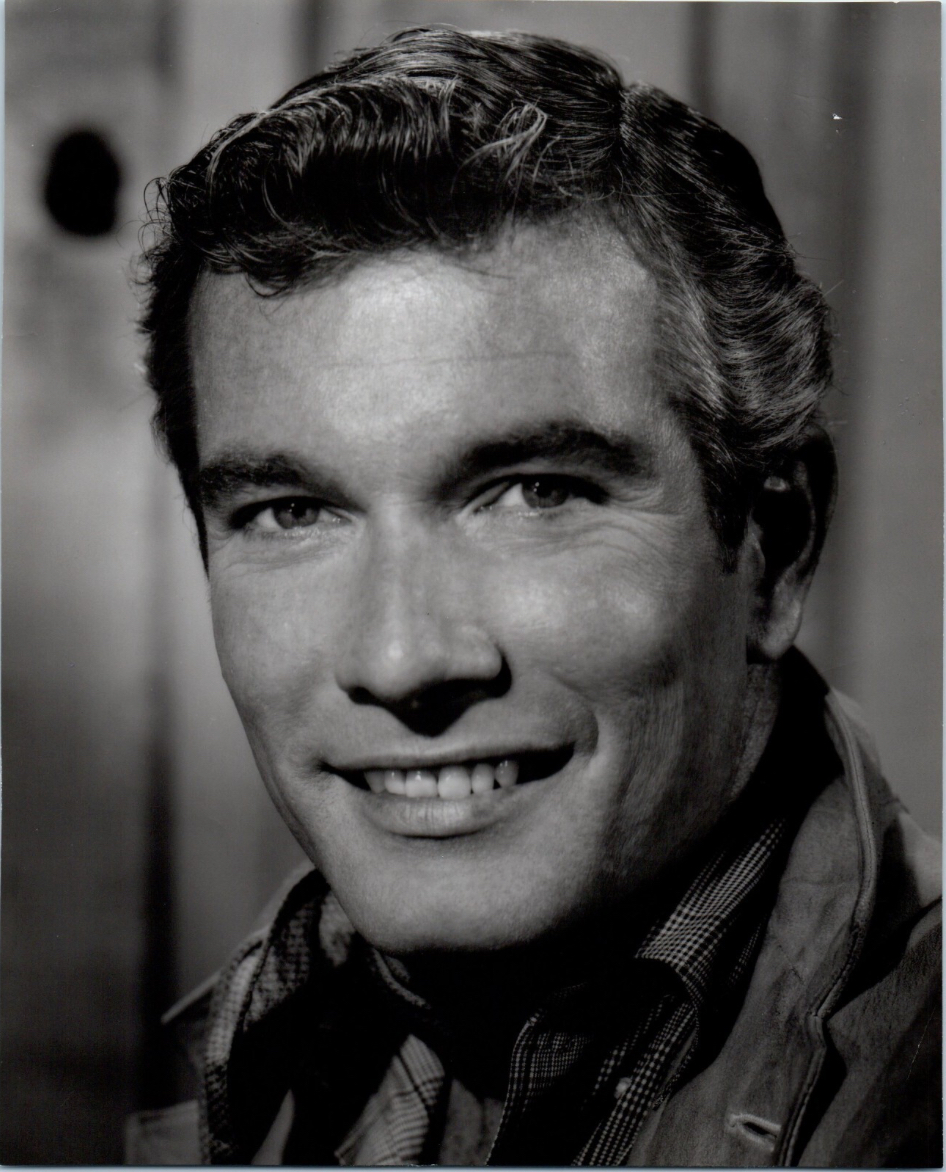
- Murphy c.1950
- Born: Donald Random Murphy; January 29, 1918; Chicago, Illinois, U.S.
- Died: May 19, 2008 (aged 90); Santa Fe, New Mexico, U.S.
- Occupation: Actor
- Years active: 1941–1971

Donald Random Murphy (January 29, 1918 – May 19, 2008) was an American film and television actor. He was known for playing Wyatt Earp's brother Virgil Earp in the 1954 film Masterson of Kansas.

Murphy was born in Chicago, Illinois. He played Johnny Ringo and two other roles in the western television series The Life and Legend of Wyatt Earp. He made appearances in television westerns such as Tombstone Territory (as Anson Gurney), Lawman (as Jack O'Reilly), Shotgun Slade (as Hal Bates), and Bat Masterson (as Charlie Ryan). Murphy guest-starred in an episode of the 1956 anthology television series G.E. Summer Originals and in the legal drama television series Perry Mason. He retired from acting in 1971, when he moved to Santa Fe, New Mexico to work as an interior designer.

In 1949 Murphy was a summer stock cast member at the Elitch Theatre in Denver, Colorado.

Murphy died in May 2008 at his home in Santa Fe, New Mexico, at the age of 90.

== Partial filmography ==
| Year | Title | Role |
|---|---|---|
| 1941 | Nice Girl? | Club Steward (uncredited) |
| 1946 | Driftin' River | Captain Rogers |
| 1947 | My Brother Talks to Horses | Bettor (uncredited) |
| 1950 | Fortunes of Captain Blood | Valdez (uncredited) |
| 1954 | Killer Leopard | Fred Winters |
| 1954 | The Bamboo Prison | Intelligence Officer (uncredited) |
| 1954 | Masterson of Kansas | Virgil Earp |
| 1955 | The Long Gray Line | Army Captain (uncredited) |
| 1955 | Seven Angry Men | Hoyt (uncredited) |
| 1955 | The Shrike | Actor in Play (uncredited) |
| 1955 | Shack Out on 101 | Pepe |
| 1956 | On the Threshold of Space | Sgt. Zack Deming |
| 1956 | Strange Intruder | Dr. Adrian Carmichael |
| 1958 | Frankenstein's Daughter | Oliver Frank/Frankenstein |
| 1966 | Lord Love a Duck | Phil Neuhauser |
| 1971 | Swamp Girl | Surly |
