= The Vigilantes Ride =

1943 film by William Berke

- Theatrical release poster
- Directed by: William Berke
- Screenplay by: Ed Earl Repp
- Produced by: Leon Barsha
- Starring: Russell Hayden; Dub Taylor; Bob Wills; Shirley Patterson; Tris Coffin; Jack Rockwell
- Cinematography: Benjamin H. Kline
- Edited by: Jerome Thoms
- Production company: Columbia Pictures
- Distributed by: Columbia Pictures
- Release date: December 23, 1943
- Running time: 56 minutes
- Country: United States
- Language: English

The Vigilantes Ride is a 1943 American Western film directed by William Berke and written by Ed Earl Repp. The film stars Russell Hayden, Dub Taylor, Bob Wills, Shirley Patterson, Tris Coffin and Jack Rockwell. The film was released on December 23, 1943, by Columbia Pictures.

== Cast ==
- Russell Hayden as Lucky Saunders
- Dub Taylor as Cannonball Taylor
- Bob Wills as Bob Allen
- Shirley Patterson as Jane Andrews
- Tris Coffin as Anse Rankin
- Jack Rockwell as Capt. Randall
- Bob Kortman as Drag
- Dick Botiller as Rogan
- Jack Kirk as Lafe Andrews
- Stanley Brown as Rod Saunders
