= Luci Ward =

American screenwriter

- Born: Lucille Ward; November 30, 1907; Ouachita Parish, Louisiana, US
- Died: November 30, 1969 (aged 62); Los Angeles, California, US
- Other name: Brooks Nevins
- Occupation: Writer
- Years active: 1936–1967
- Spouse: Jack Natteford

Luci Ward (1907–1969) was an American screenwriter. She mostly worked on crime B movies and Western films.

== Biography ==
Ward was born and raised in Monroe, Louisiana, the daughter of Edgar Ward and Lucille Pipes. She had a brother, Royce, and two step-siblings from her father's second marriage (her mother died when she was young).

Ward began her career as a secretary to First National executives and screenwriters (including Ben Markson) before becoming a script girl. Later, she got a chance to pen her own scripts. She also wrote articles for publications like Cosmopolitan, sometimes using the pen name Brooks Nevins.

She testified at a National Labor Relations Board hearing that she was hired as a stenographer at Warner Brothers for $25 a week and wasn't given a raise when she was promoted to screenwriter. Warner Brothers then hired her a personal secretary at $32.50 a week.

She was married to fellow screenwriter Jack Natteford and co-wrote several films with him.

== Selected filmography ==
- Murder by an Aristocrat (1936)
- Mountain Justice (1937)
- Melody for Two (1937)
- Call the Mesquiteers (1938)
- Red River Range (1938)
- The Kansas Terrors (1939)
- The Arizona Kid (1939)
- Beyond the Sacramento (1940)
- Bad Men of the Hills (1942)
- The Fighting Buckaroo (1943)
- Law of the Northwest (1943)
- Riding West (1944)
- Raiders of Ghost City (1944)
- Dick Tracy vs. Cueball (1946)
- Return of the Bad Men (1948)
- Rustlers (1949)
- Ride To Hangman's Tree (1967)

== Bibliography ==
- Jill Nelmes & Jule Selbo. Women Screenwriters: An International Guide. Palgrave Macmillan, 2015.
- Pitts, Michael R. Western Movies: A Guide to 5,105 Feature Films. McFarland, 2012.
