= Tillie the Toiler (1941 film) =

1941 US film directed by Sidney Salkow

- Directed by: Sidney Salkow
- Screenplay by: Karen DeWolf; Francis Martin
- Story by: Karen DeWolf
- Based on: the comic strip, Tillie the Toiler by Russ Westover
- Produced by: Ralph Cohn
- Starring: Kay Harris; William Tracy; Daphne Pollard
- Cinematography: Henry Freulich; Philip Tannura
- Edited by: Gene Milford; Arthur Seid
- Music by: M. W. Stoloff
- Distributed by: Columbia Pictures
- Release date: August 7, 1941 (US)
- Running time: 67 minutes
- Country: United States
- Language: English

Tillie the Toiler is a 1941 American comedy film directed by Sidney Salkow and starring Kay Harris, William Tracy, and Daphne Pollard. The screenplay was written by Karen DeWolf and Francis Martin, from DeWolf's story, which in turn was based on the comic strip of the same name by Russ Westover. It was the second film based on the comic strip, and the first sound picture, the other being the 1927 silent film also titled Tillie the Toiler.

== Cast list ==
- Kay Harris as Tillie Jones
- William Tracy as Clarence "Mac" MacDougall
- George Watts as Simpkins
- Daphne Pollard as Mumsy
- Jack Arnold as Wally Whipple
- Marjorie Reynolds as Bubbles
- Bennie Bartlett as Glennie
- Stanley Brown as Ted Williams
- Ernest Truex as George Winker
- Franklin Pangborn as Perry Tweedale
- Sylvia Field as Teacher
- Edward Gargan as Policeman
- Ralph Dunn as Policeman
- Harry Tyler as Pop
- Harry C. Bradley as Man in derby
- Netta Packer as Miss Wilson
- Ben Hall as Messenger boy
- Bruce Bennett as Tom
- Harry Anderson as Workman
- Eddie Laughton as Delivery man
- Arthur Stuart Hull as Little man
- Mary Ainslee as Stella
- Claire DuBrey as Stella's mother
- Louise Currie as Mrs. Williams
- Joe McGuinn as Stage manager
- Larry Williams as Jim
- Charles Gordon as Young man
- Richard Crane as Young man
- Richard Keene as Ronald
- Robert Kent as George

== Bibliography ==
- Fetrow, Alan G. Feature Films, 1940-1949: a United States Filmography. McFarland, 1994.
