= The Marshal of Gunsight Pass =

- Genre: Western
- Directed by: Philip Booth; Frank Fox
- Starring: Russell Hayden; Eddie Dean; Riley Hill; Roscoe Ates; Jan Sterling
- Country of origin: United States
- No. of seasons: 1
- No. of episodes: 22

Production
- Producers: Philip Booth; Lou Holzer
- Running time: 30 minutes

Original release
- Network: ABC
- Release: March 12 – September 30, 1950

The Marshal of Gunsight Pass is an American live broadcast Western television series that began on March 12, 1950, and ended on September 30, 1950, with a one-month hiatus in April and May.

Based on a radio program, the show starred Russell Hayden (1912–1981), Eddie Dean (1907–1999), and Riley Hill as Marshal No. 1, Marshal No. 2, and Marshal No. 3, respectively. Hayden, who is not identified by a character name, left the program because he was dissatisfied with the way it was directed. Dean uses his own name in the series, and Hill is known as "Riley Roberts". Smith Ballew took over the title role in May 1950.

Roscoe Ates (1895–1962) played the stuttering, popeyed deputy Roscoe; Andy Parker (1913–1977), Andy, and Bert Wenland (1929–2004), Bud Glover.Jan Sterling (1921–2004), then Jane Adrian, appeared at the age of twenty-nine as Ruth, the deputy's niece. In May 1950, Kay Christopher was the female lead.

The ABC program was broadcast from the former Vitagraph Studios site, near Chatsworth, which the network had bought. The network invested more than $1 million to enable production of this and other live programs. All scenes were shot indoors, with projectors used to create background images — stationary or moving — for outdoor action. Geared toward a children's audience, the program was telecast live to West Coast stations and viewed via kinescope elsewhere. Even in 1950, the production of the program seemed unusually primitive. However, the studio did have a large collection of Western props and sets, as well as live horses.

The 22-episode series aired live at 7 p.m. on Thursdays on the West Coast.

Nancy Goodwin was the program's chief writer.

From 1952-1954, CBS also aired a live afternoon Western, Action in the Afternoon.
