= Sabotage Squad =

1942 film

- Theatrical release poster
- Directed by: Lew Landers
- Screenplay by: Bernice Petkere; Wallace Sullivan; David Silverstein
- Story by: Bernice Petkere; Wallace Sullivan
- Produced by: Jack Fier
- Starring: Bruce Bennett; Kay Harris; Edward Norris; Sidney Blackmer; Don Beddoe; John Tyrrell
- Cinematography: Franz Planer
- Edited by: William Lyon
- Production company: Columbia Pictures
- Distributed by: Columbia Pictures
- Release date: August 27, 1942
- Running time: 60 minutes
- Country: United States
- Language: English

Sabotage Squad is a 1942 American action film directed by Lew Landers and written by Bernice Petkere, Wallace Sullivan and David Silverstein. The film stars Bruce Bennett, Kay Harris, Edward Norris, Sidney Blackmer, Don Beddoe and John Tyrrell. The film was released on August 27, 1942, by Columbia Pictures.

== Plot ==
Small-time gambler Eddie is rejected for military service due to ill health. His girlfriend, Edith, has turned to cop John Cronin to help get Eddie out of trouble. Cronin thinks the hair salon where Edith works is a front for a Nazi spy ring because Dr. Harrison, head of a research institute, keeps visiting it. Eddie's friend Chuck, a pickpocket, steals Harrison's wallet and finds a secret Nazi medallion inside. Frightened, Chuck gives the wallet to Eddie. Cronin tails Eddie, hoping that he'll lead the police to the wallet's owner. After a series of coincidences, Harrison kidnaps Eddie, Chuck, and Edith. Chuck manages to free the trio after picking a gun from Harrison's pocket. The three try to escape in a truck, only to discover that it is loaded with explosives and that Harrison intends to blow up an airplane factory. Chuck and Edith escape with evidence exposing the spy ring, while Eddie sacrifices his own life destroying the truck. The military posthumously awards Eddie a medal for heroism.

== Cast ==
- Bruce Bennett as Lieutenant John Cronin
- Kay Harris as Edith Cassell
- Edward Norris as Eddie Miller
- Sidney Blackmer as Carlyle Harrison
- Don Beddoe as Chief Hanley
- John Tyrrell as Robert Fuller
- George McKay as Chuck Brown
- Robert Emmett Keane as Conrad
- Eddie Laughton as Felix
- Lester Dorr as Harry
