= Dan Beddoe =

British opera singer (1863–1937)

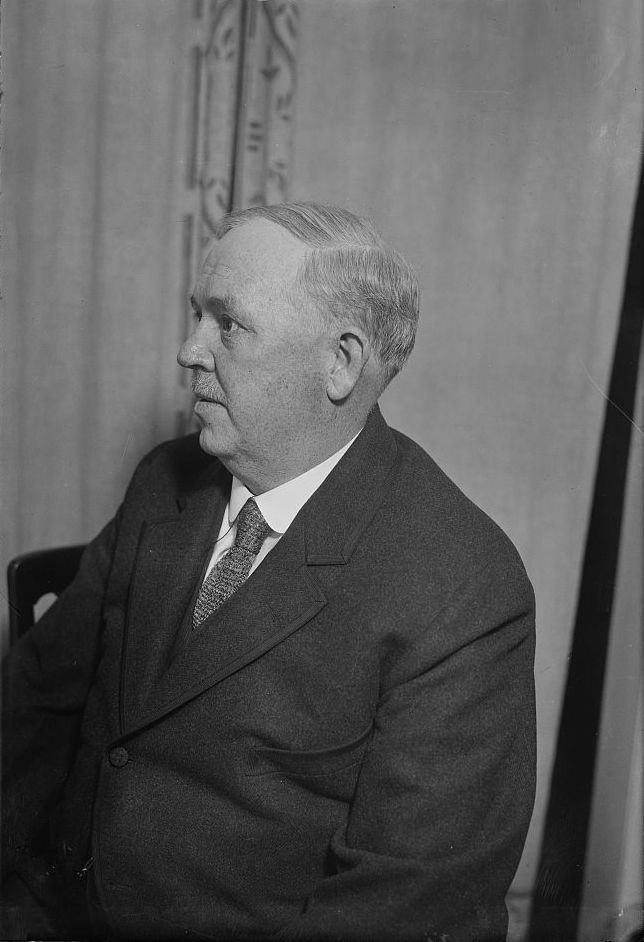
Dan Beddoe (1918)

Dan Theophilus Beddoe (16 March 1863 – 26 December 1937) was a Welsh tenor, particularly known for his performances in oratorio over a career spanning 50 years.

== Biography ==
Beddoe was born in Aberdare in the Cynon Valley of Wales to Gwenllian Theophilus and Thomas Beddoe. At the age of 19 he won the gold medal and First Prize in the National Eisteddfod of Wales and for a while taught singing in a school in Llwynypia. He then went to the United States for further study in Cleveland with John Underner and Pittsburgh under J. T. Davies.

After hearing him in a concert, Walter Damrosch engaged him as the tenor soloist for the Berlioz Requiem which he was conducting at Carnegie Hall in 1903—Beddoe's official oratorio debut. The following year, he toured with Damrosch and the New York Philharmonic singing the title role in concert performances of Parsifal. He subsequently toured widely in the US and Britain, and frequently appeared with the Oratorio Society of New York. His made his debut with the society in 1905 as the tenor soloist in the US premiere of Richard Strauss's Taillefer conducted by Damrosch.

From 1919 to 1935, Beddoe taught at the Cincinnati Conservatory of Music, but continued his performance career as well. In 1933, at the age of 70, he sang as the tenor soloist in Handel's Messiah with the Oratorio Society of New York. The New York Times' critic wrote:

The years have dealt kindly with Mr. Beddoe's voice, as time might wear silver coin bright if thin, and the supreme loveliness of his "Comfort ye" was not dimmed.

Beddoe retired in 1935 after he was injured in a car accident in Cincinnati. He died suddenly in New York City at the age of 74 while he and his wife Mary were visiting their son. He was survived by his wife, their daughter Gladys Vermilya, and their son Don Beddoe, who was appearing in Father Malachy's Miracle at the St. James Theatre at the time of his father's death.

== Recordings ==
Beddoe recorded 23 songs between 1911 and 1928. These include:

- "Irish love song" (19 May 1911)
- "Yesterday and today" (24 June 1913)
- "A moonlight song" (21 July 1913)
- "A heart like thine" (1922)
- "El bruns" (23 February 1928)
