= Tillie the Toiler (1927 film) =

1927 film by Hobart Henley

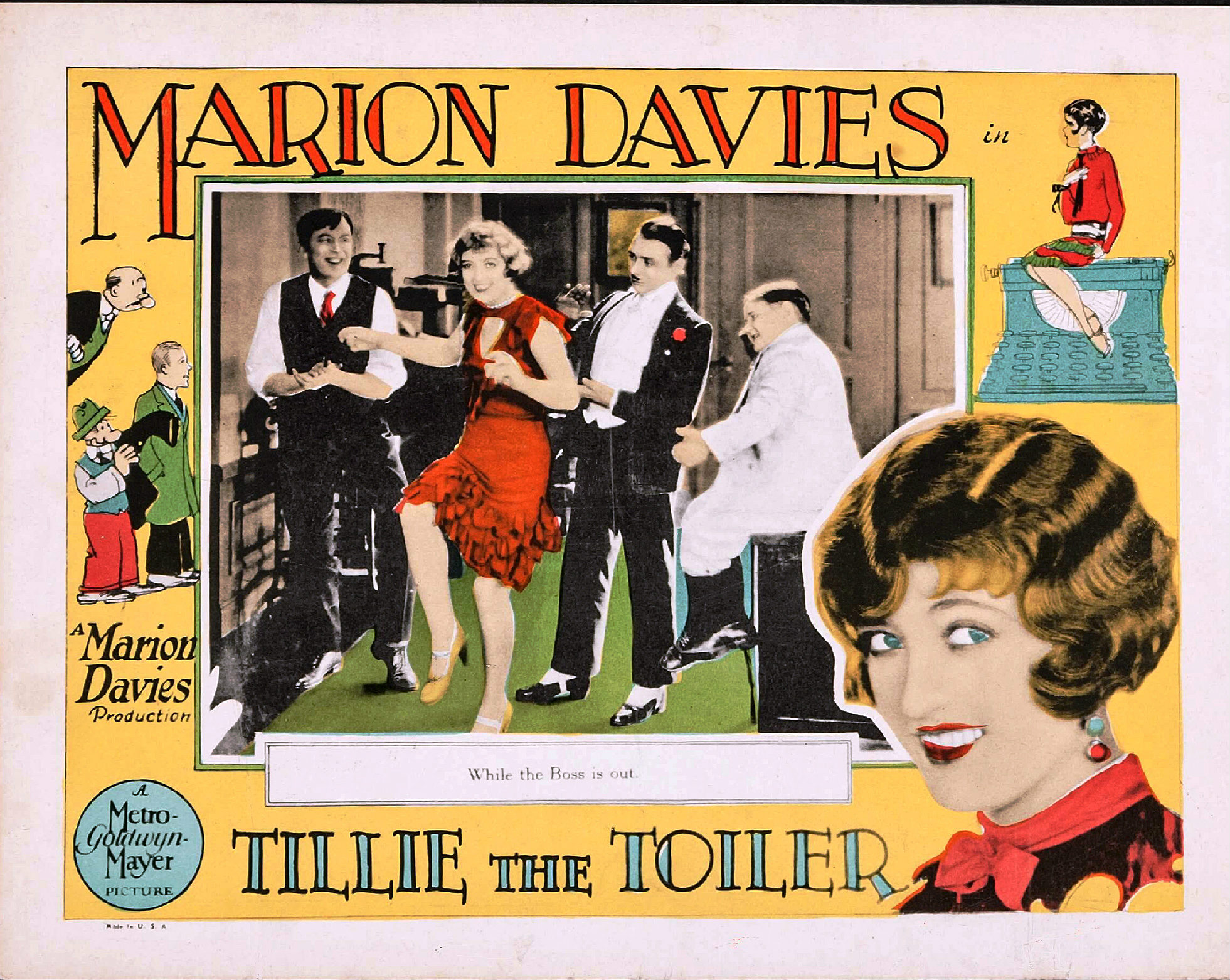
- Lobby card
- Directed by: Hobart Henley
- Written by: A. P. Younger (screenplay); Ralph Spence (intertitles)
- Story by: Agnes Christine Johnston; Edward T. Lowe Jr.
- Based on: Tillie the Toiler by Russ Westover
- Produced by: Marion Davies; Cosmopolitan Productions
- Starring: Marion Davies
- Cinematography: William H. Daniels
- Edited by: Daniel J. Gray
- Distributed by: Metro-Goldwyn-Mayer
- Release date: May 21, 1927
- Running time: 7 reels
- Country: United States
- Language: Silent (English intertitles)
- Budget: $505,000

Tillie the Toiler is a 1927 American silent film comedy produced by Cosmopolitan Productions and released through Metro Goldwyn Mayer studios. It is based on Russ Westover's popular comic strip Tillie the Toiler. The film was directed by Hobart Henley and stars Marion Davies.

Another adaptation of the same title was released in 1941.

== Plot ==
Tillie Jones is a young, aspirational working girl who moves to the big city to work and support her family. After landing a job at a clothing factory, Tillie soon finds herself embroiled in romantic relationships and office politics. Tillie has to deal with the attention of other suitors while also attracting the attention of her boss, Mr. Simpkins. Tillie's wit and tenacity are put to the test as she tries to succeed in both her personal and professional lives. In the end, Tillie's achieves victory over hardship.

== Cast ==
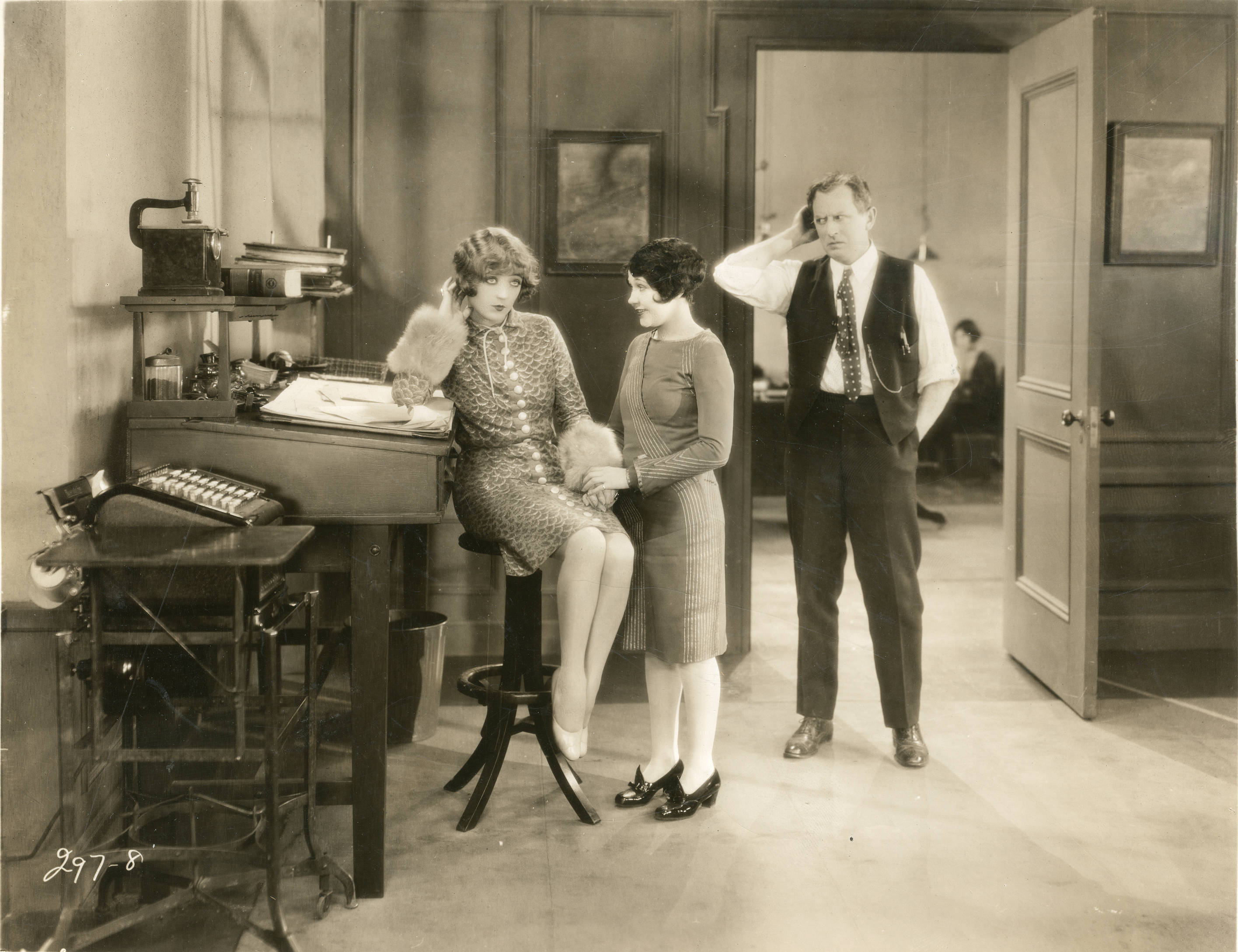
Marion Davies, Gertrude Short and Matt Moore in Tillie the Toiler

- Marion Davies as Tillie Jones
- Matt Moore as Mac
- Harry Crocker as Pennington Fish
- George Fawcett as Mr. Simpkins
- George K. Arthur as Mr. whipple
- Estelle Clark as Sadie
- Bert Roach as Bill
- Gertrude Short as Bubbles
- Claire McDowell as Maude Jones
- Arthur Hoyt as Mr. Smythe
- Ida May (uncredited)
- Mary Forbes as Mrs. Fish, Pennington's Mother (uncredited)
- James Murray as One of Tillie's Admirers in Restaurant (uncredited)
- Russ Powell as One of Tillie's Admirers on Street (uncredited)
- Turner Savage as Bill & Sadie's Chubby Boy (uncredited)

== Production ==
In her 24th film, Marion Davies starred as the scatterbrained Tillie Jones, which was based on the famous comic strip. Davies donned a black wig for the part and remembered that she worked on this film while she was also working on The Red Mill. She recalled that for six weeks, she had to sleep on a couch in her bungalow. This was another hit film for Davies. Lucille Ball always claimed she had a bit part as an extra in this film, but was only 15 years old and was still on the East Coast while Tillie the Toiler was shot in Hollywood. Ball always claimed Davies as one of her role models.

== Survival status ==
The only known print exists at the Eastman House Museum in Rochester, New York.
