= Black Hills (1947 film) =

1947 film

- Directed by: Ray Taylor
- Written by: Joseph F. Poland
- Produced by: Jerry Thomas
- Starring: Eddie Dean; Shirley Patterson; Roscoe Ates
- Cinematography: Ernest Miller
- Edited by: Hugh Winn
- Music by: Walter Greene
- Production company: Producers Releasing Corporation
- Distributed by: Eagle-Lion Films
- Release date: October 26, 1947
- Running time: 60 minutes
- Country: United States
- Language: English

Black Hills is a 1947 American Western film directed by Ray Taylor and starring Eddie Dean, Shirley Patterson, and Roscoe Ates. It was shot at the Iverson Ranch. It was part of a series of fifteen B westerns produced by PRC featuring Dean and Ates.

== Cast ==
- Eddie Dean as Eddie Dean
- Roscoe Ates as Soapy Jones
- Shirley Patterson as Janet Hadley
- Terry Frost as Dan Kirby
- Steve Drake as Larry Hadley
- Nina Bara as Chiquita
- William Fawcett as Clerk Tuttle
- Lane Bradford as Henchman Al Cooper
- Lee Morgan as Sheriff
- George Chesebro as Land Agent Henry Allen
- Slim Whitaker as Pete - Gambler

== Bibliography ==
- Drew, Bernard A. Motion Picture Series and Sequels: A Reference Guide. Routledge, 2013.
- Hanson, Patricia King & Dunkleberger, Amy. Afi: American Film Institute Catalog of Motion Pictures Produced in the United States : Feature Films 1941-1950. University of California Press, 1999.
