= The Cowboy from Sundown =

- Theatrical release poster
- Directed by: Spencer Gordon Bennet
- Screenplay by: Roland Lynch; Robert Emmett Tansey
- Story by: Roland Lynch
- Produced by: Edward Finney
- Starring: Tex Ritter; Roscoe Ates; Carleton Young; George Pembroke; Patsy Moran; Pauline Haddon
- Cinematography: Marcel Le Picard
- Edited by: Russell F. Schoengarth
- Music by: Frank Sanucci
- Production company: Monogram Pictures
- Distributed by: Monogram Pictures
- Release date: May 9, 1940
- Running time: 57 minutes
- Country: United States
- Language: English

The Cowboy from Sundown is a 1940 American Western film directed by Spencer Gordon Bennet and written by Roland Lynch and Robert Emmett Tansey. The film stars Tex Ritter, Roscoe Ates, Carleton Young, George Pembroke, Patsy Moran and Pauline Haddon. The film was released on May 9, 1940, by Monogram Pictures.

== Cast ==
- Tex Ritter as Tex Rockett
- Roscoe Ates as Gloomy Day
- Carleton Young as Nick Cuttler
- George Pembroke as Cylus Cuttler
- Patsy Moran as Prunella Wallaby
- Pauline Haddon as Bee Davis
- Glenn Strange as Bret Stockton
- Slim Andrews as Judge Hank Pritchard
- Bud Osborne as Pronto Parsons
- Joe McGuinn as Rip Carter
- Dave O'Brien as Steve Davis
- Chick Hannan as Pete
- Tris Coffin as Ben Varco
