= Bob Gustafson =

American cartoonist

Robert Dana Gustafson (August 8, 1920 – November 28, 2001) was an American cartoonist whose work includes eight years on Tillie the Toiler and a 27-year run on the Beetle Bailey comic books.

Bob Gustafson's Specs (1946)

== Early life ==
Gustafson was born on August 8, 1920, in Brookline, Massachusetts and went to Brookline High School. He served in the Army as a pilot and pitched semi-pro baseball in the Boston area. Gustafson attended Boston's School of the Museum of Fine Arts and did his first work for Bostonian magazine in the early 1940s.

== Comic strips ==
In the post-World War II years he did his Sunday strip Specs for the New York Tribune Syndicate. Published for one full year (May 12, 1946 to May 25, 1947), it was a filler strip which did not always appear every week.

In the 1950s, he did gag cartoons for Ladies' Home Journal, Ridgefield Press, Good Housekeeping, The Saturday Evening Post, Collier's and Judge. He assisted on Russ Westover's Tillie the Toiler strip for King Features. After Westover departed, Gustafson's signature appeared on the strip beginning October 4, 1954 and ending March 7, 1959.

In the 1960s, he assisted as a writer on Joe Palooka for the McNaught Syndicate before joining Mort Walker's staff. From 1963 until the mid-1970s, he assisted on Walker's Beetle Bailey, Boner's Ark and Hi and Lois. Gustafson was mainly involved in the Beetle Bailey comic books published by Dell Publishing/Western (early 1960s), King Comics (mid-1960s) and Charlton Comics (early 1970s). He drew Robert Baldwin's Freddy for Dell Comics and his other work for Dell includes Mr. Magoo and Ponytail.

== Editorial cartoons ==
In later years, he did editorial cartoons for the Acorn group of Connecticut newspapers.

== Awards ==
Gustafson received the National Cartoonists Society Comic Book Award for 1962 and 1982 and their Humor Comic Book Award for 1971 and 1972. He retired to Old Greenwich, Connecticut and died there on November 28, 2001.
