= Stars Over Texas =

1946 film by Robert Emmett Tansey

- Directed by: Robert Emmett Tansey
- Written by: Frances Kavanaugh
- Produced by: Robert Emmett Tansey; Jerry Thomas
- Starring: Eddie Dean; Roscoe Ates; Shirley Patterson
- Cinematography: Ernest Miller
- Edited by: Hugh Winn
- Music by: Karl Hajos
- Distributed by: Producers Releasing Corporation
- Release date: 18 November 1946
- Running time: 59 minutes
- Country: United States
- Language: English

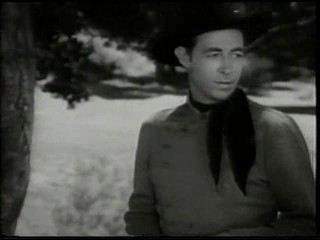
Eddie Dean in Stars Over Texas (1946)

Stars Over Texas is a 1946 American Western film directed by Robert Emmett Tansey and starring Eddie Dean, Roscoe Ates, and Shirley Patterson.

== Cast ==
- Eddie Dean as Eddie Dean
- Flash as Flash - Eddie's Horse
- Roscoe Ates as "Soapy" Jones
- Shirley Patterson as Terry Lawrence
- Lee Bennett as Waco Harper / Bert Ford
- Lee Roberts as Hank Lawrence, Bar L
- Kermit Maynard as Henchman Knuckles
- Jack O'Shea as Ringo Evans, Cross E Ranch
- Hal Smith as Peddler Tucker
- Matty Roubert as Henchman Buggsy
- Carl Mathews as Henchman Two-Horn
- William Fawcett as "Judge" Diamond Smith
- The Sunshine Boys as Singing Ranchhands

== Soundtrack ==
- Eddie Dean with the Sunshine Boys - "Stars Over Texas" (written by Eddie Dean and Hal Blair)
- Eddie Dean with the Sunshine Boys - "Sands of the Old Rio Grande" (written by Eddie Dean and Glenn Strange as Glen Strange)
- Eddie Dean with the Sunshine Boys - "Fifteen Hundred and One Miles of Heaven" (written by Eddie Dean)
