= Smashing the Spy Ring =

1939 film directed by Christy Cabanne

- Directed by: Christy Cabanne
- Screenplay by: Arthur T. Horman; Dorrell McGowan; Stuart McGowan
- Story by: Stuart McGowan; Dorrell McGowan
- Produced by: Jack Fier
- Starring: Ralph Bellamy; Fay Wray; Regis Toomey
- Cinematography: Allen G. Siegler
- Edited by: James Sweeney
- Music by: M. W. Stoloff
- Production company: Columbia Pictures
- Release date: December 29, 1938 (US)
- Running time: 62 minutes
- Country: United States
- Language: English

Smashing the Spy Ring is a 1938 American drama film, directed by Christy Cabanne. It stars Ralph Bellamy, Fay Wray, and Regis Toomey, and was released on December 29, 1938.

== Plot ==
Undercover secret agents John Baxter and Ted Hall apprehend a foreign spy at a factory, but he is shot by Steve Corben. They are transferred to Washington D.C. to work with Phil Dunlap to break up a spy ring, but Phil is quickly killed. Phil's sister Eleanor agrees to help finish the work. During the testing of a new chemical weapon, Ted fakes his death while John impersonates the gas's inventor Professor Leonard and feigns a mental breakdown. John and Eleanor, who pretends to be Leonard's sisters, admit themselves into the spy ring's sanatorium to gather intelligence but are discovered and captured. They escape by throwing acid from the laboratory at their captors before the D.C. Metropolitan Police Department surrounds the building. John and Eleanor become engaged, and Ted begins writing a novel based on the adventure.

== Cast ==
- Ralph Bellamy as John Baxter
- Fay Wray as Eleanor Dunlap
- Regis Toomey as Ted Hall
- Walter Kingsford as Dr. L. B. Carter
- Ann Doran as Madelon Martin
- Warren Hull as Phil Dunlap
- Forbes Murray as Colonel Scully
- Adrian Booth as Miss Loring (credited as Lorna Gray)
- Paul Whitney as Mason
- Bess Flowers as Mrs. Austin
- John Tyrrell as Johnson
