= Don Beddoe =

American actor (1903–1991)

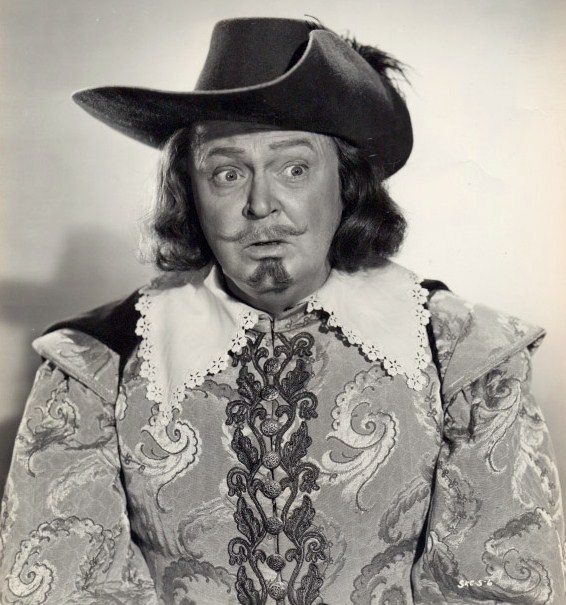
- Beddoe in Cyrano de Bergerac (1950)
- Born: Donald Theophilus Beddoe; July 1, 1903; Pittsburgh, Pennsylvania, U.S.
- Died: January 19, 1991 (aged 87); Laguna Hills, California, U.S
- Occupations: Film, television and stage actor
- Years active: 1929–1984
- Spouses: Evelyn Beddoe (m. 1943; died 1974) Joyce Mathews (m. 1974)
- Father: Dan Beddoe

Donald Theophilus Beddoe (July 1, 1903 – January 19, 1991) was an American character actor.

== Early years ==
Born in Pittsburgh, Pennsylvania, Beddoe was the son of Dan Beddoe, a Welsh classical singer, and his wife Mary. He graduated from the University of Cincinnati with bachelor's and master's degrees and taught English for three years.

== Stage ==
Beddoe gained much theatrical experience playing in stock theater in Boston, Massachusetts, and Philadelphia, Pennsylvania. He made his Broadway acting debut in 1929, receiving top billing (over a young Spencer Tracy) in Nigger Rich. His other Broadway credits include Penny Arcade (1930), The Greeks Had a Word for It (1930), Sing High, Sing Low (1931), The Warrior's Husband (1932), Man Bites Dog (1933), The Blue Widow (1933), Birthright (1933), The Sky's the Limit (1934), Nowhere Bound (1935), First Lady (1935), Father Malachy's Miracle (1937), and Winged Victory (1943).

== Film ==
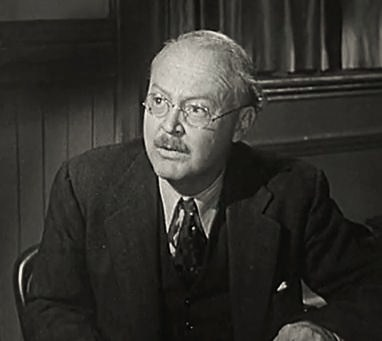
Beddoe in Behind Green Lights (1946)

After a decade of stage work and bit parts in films, Beddoe began more prominent film roles in the late 1930s. He was usually cast as fast-talking reporters and the like. His commercial acting career was put on hold when he served in World War II in the United States Army Air Forces, in which he performed in the Air Force play, Winged Victory.

Beddoe subsequently returned to films playing small character roles. He occasionally appeared in comedy shorts playing comic foils, such as in the Three Stooges shorts Three Sappy People and You Nazty Spy!

Beddoe appeared in more than 250 films.

== Television ==
Beddoe portrayed Mr. Tolliver in the ABC comedy The Second Hundred Years, and he was in the cast of Life with Father on CBS.

He also was seen in dozens of television programs. In the 1950s and 1960s, he made four appearances on Father Knows Best Have Gun – Will Travel, three on Lawman, three on Maverick, three on Laramie, three on Lassie, one on Mr. Adams and Eve, and three on Perry Mason including in the 1958 episode 'The Case of the Buried Clock'. He also appeared on the Western aviation series, Sky King, on The Alaskans, on the adventure series, Straightaway, and on the western series, The Tall Man. He appeared too on the sitcoms Pete and Gladys and The Tom Ewell Show, and on the drama series, Going My Way. He guest starred on the crime drama, Richard Diamond, Private Detective and appeared on The Lone Ranger in the 1950s.

Beddoe played the outlaw Black Bart in the 1954 episode "Black Bart The PO8" of the western anthology series Death Valley Days.

In 1965, Beddoe appeared on Gunsmoke as "Mr. Halligan" in the episode "Deputy Festus" (S10E17). He also appeared that year on "Wagon Train" (S8 E23) "The Katy Piper Story" as the Judge opposite Frances Reid in the title role.

During the 1970–1971 season of ABC's Nanny and the Professor, Beddoe made four appearances, three as Mr. Thatcher. In 1984, he made his final television appearance as Kris in NBC's Highway to Heaven starring Michael Landon and Victor French.

== Radio ==
Beddoe played Pat Grady in the soap opera John's Other Wife.

== Other activities ==
In 1968, Beddoe proposed construction of a "high-rise trailer park" to be built in Capistrano Beach, California. His plan called for making "more efficient use of land in areas where acreage is too expensive for a trailer park" by building an eight-story structure of concrete and steel and using a crane to lift trailers and insert them into their respective spaces.

== Personal life ==
He married Joyce Rose, who had been a showgirl.

== Death ==
Beddoe died of natural causes on January 19, 1991, at age 87.

== Selected filmography ==
- The 13th Man (1937) - District Attorney's Aide (uncredited)
- There's That Woman Again (1938) - Johnson
- The Lone Wolf Spy Hunt (1939) - Inspector Thomas
- Flying G-Men (1939) - W. S. Hamilton
- Blondie Meets the Boss (1939) - Marvin Williams
- Romance of the Redwoods (1939) - Forbes
- Union Pacific (1939) - Reporter (uncredited)
- Outside These Walls (1939) - Dinky
- Mandrake the Magician (1939, Serial) - Frank Raymond
- Missing Daughters (1939) - Al Farrow
- Good Girls Go to Paris (1939) - Attorney Thomas Jamison (uncredited)
- Coast Guard (1939) - Bartender (uncredited)
- The Man They Could Not Hang (1939) - Police Lieutenant Shane
- Konga, the Wild Stallion (1939) - Fred Martin
- Golden Boy (1939) - Borneo
- Those High Grey Walls (1939) - Jockey
- The Taming of the West (1939) - Coleman (uncredited)
- Scandal Sheet (1939) - Chick Keller
- Beware Spooks! (1939) - Nick Bruno
- The Amazing Mr. Williams (1939) - Detective Deever
- My Son Is Guilty (1939) - Duke Mason
- Cafe Hostess (1940) - Customer (uncredited)
- The Lone Wolf Strikes (1940) - Conroy
- Convicted Woman (1940) - Hank, a Reporter (uncredited)
- Blondie on a Budget (1940) - Marvin Williams
- The Doctor Takes a Wife (1940) - Morning Express Reporter (uncredited)
- The Man from Tumbleweeds (1940) - Governor Dawson
- Charlie Chan's Murder Cruise (1940) - James Ross
- Escape to Glory (1940) - Ship's Chief Engineer Anderson
- Men Without Souls (1940) - Warden Schafer
- Island of Doomed Men (1940) - Brand
- Texas Stagecoach (1940) - Tug Wilson
- The Lone Wolf Strikes (1940) - Police Doctor (uncredited)
- Manhattan Heartbeat (1940) - Preston
- Girls of the Road (1940) - Sheriff
- Military Academy (1940) - Marty Lewis
- The Secret Seven (1940) - Major Blinn
- Five Little Peppers in Trouble (1940) - Process Server (uncredited)
- Before I Hang (1940) - Captain McGraw
- Glamour for Sale (1940) - Frank Regan
- So You Won't Talk (1940) - Cop
- West of Abilene (1940) - Forsyth
- Beyond the Sacramento (1940) - Warden McKay
- The Lone Wolf Keeps a Date (1940) - Big Joe Brady
- The Phantom Submarine (1940) - Bartlett
- This Thing Called Love (1940) - Tom Howland
- The Face Behind the Mask (1941) - Lieutenant James 'Jim' O'Hara
- Outlaws of the Panhandle (1941) - Sheriff (uncredited)
- The Lone Wolf Takes a Chance (1941) - Sheriff Haggerty
- Under Age (1941) - Albert Ward
- The Big Boss (1941) - Cliff Randall
- She Knew All the Answers (1941) - Barber
- They Dare Not Love (1941) - Second Sailor (uncredited)
- Sweetheart of the Campus (1941) - Sheriff Denby
- Two Latins from Manhattan (1941) - Don Barlow
- Texas (1941) - Sheriff
- The Blonde from Singapore (1941) - Sergeant Burns
- Unholy Partners (1941) - Michael Z. 'Mike' Reynolds
- Sing for Your Supper (1941) - Wing Boley
- Honolulu Lu (1941) - Bennie Blanchard
- Harvard, Here I Come (1941) - Hypo McGonigle
- Shut My Big Mouth (1942) - Hill
- Not a Ladies' Man (1942) - 'Professor Bigfoot' Johnson
- Meet the Stewarts (1942) - Taxi Driver
- Blondie for Victory (1942) - Mr. Larkin, Husband Who Nominates Dagwood (uncredited)
- Sabotage Squad (1942) - Chief Hanley
- The Talk of the Town (1942) - Police Chief
- Lucky Legs (1942) - Ned McLane
- Smith of Minnesota (1942) - Lew Smith
- The Boogie Man Will Get You (1942) - J. Gilbert Brampton (uncredited)
- Stand By All Networks (1942) - Enemy Agent (uncredited)
- Junior Army (1942) - Saginaw Jake
- Power of the Press (1943) - Pringle (uncredited)
- Winged Victory (1944) - Chaplain on Beach (uncredited)
- Crime, Inc. (1945) - District Attorney Dixon
- Midnight Manhunt (1945) - Detective Lieutenant Max Hurley
- Getting Gertie's Garter (1945) - Clancy (uncredited)
- The Notorious Lone Wolf (1946) - Stonley
- Behind Green Lights (1946) - Dr. G.F. Yager, Medical Examiner (uncredited)
- The Well-Groomed Bride (1946) - Hotel Clerk (uncredited)
- O.S.S. (1946) - Gates / Rodney Parrish
- The Best Years of Our Lives (1946) - Mr. Cameron
- California (1947) - Stark (uncredited)
- The Farmer's Daughter (1947) - Einar, Campaign Reporter
- Buck Privates Come Home (1947) - Mr. Roberts
- Calcutta (1947) - Jack Collins (uncredited)
- Blaze of Noon (1947) - Mr. Fell (uncredited)
- Welcome Stranger (1947) - Mort Elkins
- They Won't Believe Me (1947) - Thomason
- The Bachelor and the Bobby-Soxer (1947) - Joey
- If You Knew Susie (1948) - Editor (uncredited)
- Black Bart (1948) - J.T. Hall
- Another Part of the Forest (1948) - Penniman
- An Act of Murder (1948) - Pearson
- Hideout (1949) - Dr. Hamilton Gibbs
- The Crime Doctor's Diary (1949) - Phillip Bellem
- Bride of Vengeance (1949) - Councilor
- The Lady Gambles (1949) - Mr. Dennis Sutherland
- Easy Living (1949) - Jaeger
- Once More My Darling (1949) - Judge Fraser
- Flame of Youth (1949) - George Briggs
- Dear Wife (1949) - Metcalfe
- Dancing in the Dark (1949) - Barney Bassett
- The Great Rupert (1950) - Mr. Haggerty
- Gun Crazy (1950) - Man from Chicago (uncredited)
- Woman in Hiding (1950) - Fat Salesman
- Tarnished (1950) - Curtis Jellison
- Young Daniel Boone (1950) - Charlie Bryan
- Caged (1950) - Commissioner Sam Walker (uncredited)
- Beyond the Purple Hills (1950) - Amos Rayburn
- Emergency Wedding (1950) - Forbish, Floorwalker
- Southside 1-1000 (1950) - Slade Knight, Lawyer
- Cyrano de Bergerac (1950) - The Meddler
- Gasoline Alley (1951) - Walt Wallet
- The Enforcer (1951) - Thomas O'Hara
- Belle Le Grand (1951) - Smith (uncredited)
- The Company She Keeps (1951) - Jamieson
- Three Guys Named Mike (1951) - Mr. Haymes, First 'Wolf' on Plane (uncredited)
- Francis Goes to the Races (1951) - Dr. Quimby (uncredited)
- Million Dollar Pursuit (1951) - Bowen
- As Young as You Feel (1951) - Head of Sales (uncredited)
- Rodeo King and the Senorita (1951) - Mr. Richards
- Behave Yourself! (1951) - Police Sergeant O'Neill (uncredited)
- Corky of Gasoline Alley (1951) - Walt Wallet
- The Racket (1951) - Mitchell, Member of Craig's Office (uncredited)
- The Unknown Man (1951) - Ed
- Man in the Saddle (1951) - Love Bidwell (uncredited)
- Starlift (1951) - Bob Wayne (uncredited)
- Room for One More (1952) - Mr. Taylor (uncredited)
- Scandal Sheet (1952) - Pete (uncredited)
- Hoodlum Empire (1952) - Senator Blake
- The Narrow Margin (1952) - Detective Sergeant Gus Forbes
- Carson City (1952) - Zeke Mitchell
- Three for Bedroom "C" (1952) - Well-Wisher at Station (uncredited)
- Washington Story (1952) - Congressman Reciting Post Office History (uncredited)
- Carrie (1952) - Mr. Goodman
- Don't Bother to Knock (1952) - Mr. Ballew
- The Big Sky (1952) - Horse Trader (uncredited)
- The Iron Mistress (1952) - Dr. Cuny
- Blue Canadian Rockies (1952) - Cyrus Higbee (uncredited)
- Stop, You're Killing Me (1952) - Clyde Post
- The Clown (1953) - Gallagher
- The System (1953) - Jerry Allen
- Cow Country (1953) - Joe Davis
- The Band Wagon (1953) - Producer (uncredited)
- Jubilee Trail (1954) - Maury, Hotel Manager (uncredited)
- Loophole (1954) - Herman Tate
- River of No Return (1954) - Ben (uncredited)
- A Star Is Born (1954) - Studio Executive at Premiere (uncredited)
- The Steel Cage (1954) - Prison Board Member Alan Ferness (segment "The Hostages")
- Tarzan's Hidden Jungle (1955) - Mr. Johnson (uncredited)
- Wyoming Renegades (1955) - Horace Warren
- The Night of the Hunter (1955) - Walt Spoon
- The Killer Is Loose (1956) - Mr. Freeman (uncredited)
- The Rawhide Years (1956) - Frank Porter
- Behind the High Wall (1956) - Todd 'Mac' MacGregor
- Shootout at Medicine Bend (1957) - Mayor Sam Pelley
- The Joker Is Wild (1957) - Heckler at the Copacabana (uncredited)
- Toughest Gun in Tombstone (1958) - David Cooper, Assayer
- The Restless Gun (1958) - Henry Peabody in "The Suffragette"
- Bullwhip (1958) - Judge Carr
- Perry Mason (1958) - Dr. Blane
- Warlock (1959) - Dr. Wagner
- Pillow Talk (1959) - Mr. Walters (scenes deleted)
- Alfred Hitchcock Presents (1960) (Season 5 Episode 27: "The Cuckoo Clock") - Burt
- The Wizard of Baghdad (1960) - Caliph Raschid (uncredited)
- Boy Who Caught a Crook (1961) - Colonel
- Saintly Sinners (1962) - Father Dan Sheridan
- Jack the Giant Killer (1962) - Imp
- Papa's Delicate Condition (1963) - Mayor Ghio's Assistant
- Cattle King (1963) - John, Cheyenne Club Drunk (uncredited)
- For Love or Money (1963) - Milo (uncredited)
- A Very Special Favor (1965) - Mr. Calvin Ruthledge (uncredited)
- Texas Across the River (1966) - Mr. Naylor
- The Impossible Years (1968) - Dr. Elliot Fish
- Generation (1969) - Gilbert
- How Do I Love Thee? (1970) - Dr. Littlefield
- Nickel Mountain (1984) - Doc Cathey (final film role)
