= The Great Adventures of Wild Bill Hickok =

1938 film

- Directed by: Mack V. Wright; Sam Nelson
- Written by: George Arthur Durlam; Dallas M. Fitzgerald; Tom Gibson; Charles Arthur Powell (screenplay); John Peere Miles (story)
- Produced by: Jack Fier (uncredited); Harry S. Webb (associate producer, billed as supervisor)
- Starring: Bill Elliott (as Gordon Elliott); Monte Blue; Carole Wayne; Frankie Darro; Dickie Jones
- Cinematography: Benjamin H. Kline; George Meehan
- Edited by: Richard Fantl
- Distributed by: Columbia Pictures
- Release date: June 30, 1938
- Running time: 15 chapters
- Country: United States
- Language: English

The Great Adventures of Wild Bill Hickok (1938) is a Columbia Pictures movie serial. It was the fourth of the 57 serials released by Columbia and the studio's first Western serial. The serial was the first to be produced by Columbia personnel; Columbia's previous three serials had been produced by the independent Weiss Brothers company, using Columbia's facilities.

== Plot ==
Wild Bill Hickok, U.S. Marshal, is sent to stop the mysterious "Phantom Raiders" from disrupting the cattle drives across the Chisholm Trail and the construction of a new railroad. Hickok intercedes when a wagon train of settlers from Texas, bound for Abilene, Kansas, is threatened by Indian attacks. The leaders of the wagon train are the Cameron family, Army scout Kit Lawson, and escort Jim Blakely. The opposition, working in secret, is led by Morrell in league with shifty businessman Joshua Bruce and wagon-train malcontent Scudder. During the course of the story, which endangers Hickok at every turn, Hickok must ride between Kansas and Texas to keep an eye on both factions. Hickok befriends the locals, including bartender Snake-Eyes, print-shop owner Danny, saloon confidant Gally, halfbreed brave Jerry, and most of the young boys in the area (whom he deputizes so they can report their observations to him).

== Cast ==
- Gordon Elliott as Wild Bill Hickok, U.S. Marshal
- Monte Blue as Mr. Cameron
- Carole Wayne as Ruth Cameron
- Frankie Darro as Jerry/Little Brave Heart
- Dickie Jones as Buddy
- Sammy McKim as Boots
- Kermit Maynard as Kit Lawson, Army scout
- Roscoe Ates as Oscar "Snake-Eyes" Smith, bartender
- Monte Collins as Danny, printer
- Reed Hadley as Jim Blakely
- Chief Thundercloud as Chief Gray Eagle
- Ray Mala as Little Elk
- Robert Fiske as Morrell, villain and leader of the Phantom Raiders
- Walter Wills as Joshua Bruce
- J. P. McGowan as Scudder, trail leader
- Eddie Waller as Stone
- Lee Phelps as Gally
- Richard Cramer as The Apache Killer

=== Stunts ===
- Gene Alsace
- Chuck Hamilton
- Ted Mapes
- Carl Mathews
- Kermit Maynard
- Tom Steele
- Francis Walker

== Production ==
The serial was shot on location in Utah (Johnson Canyon, Three Lakes, and Parry Lodge). The production budget was an exceptional $200,000, this when the average western feature cost $10,000 to produce, and the film featured a great deal of elaborate outdoor scenes, including cattle drives and stampedes, staged especially for this production.

== Reception ==
Columbia screened the first two chapters for showmen and trade reviewers. Boxoffice predicted, "This should prove a boxoffice bonanza for exhibitors. It is a corking good western serial with plenty of action." Film Daily reported, "Starting off with a bang, this Columbia serial should click with serial fans. It has action and more action. There are Indians, phantom rustlers, gunmen, and bad men for the enterprising Hickok to overcome, but after watching the first two chapters we feel sure that he is equal to the task." Motion Picture Herald said that the serial, "assuming that the chapters are all as exciting and interestingly presented as the first two, is destined for highly receptive audience reaction. Gordon Elliott plays Wild Bill. His is a personality that fits the plainsman and he plays the part to the hilt."

The serial became a huge success in theaters, according to a tally published in Motion Picture Herald and Film Daily. Exhibitors thought the serial was outstanding. "The Great Adventures of Wild Bill Hickok is the greatest serial I ever had the pleasure to run. Boys, if Columbia salesmen want you to run it, grab it. I repeat, it is a knockout. If Columbia continues to make them as good as this one, they will run the other serials out of business." (M. W, Bretzke of Kenmare, North Dakota). "I am on my third chapter now and I can say it's without a doubt the greatest serial I have ever run. This has all the earmarks of Wells Fargo or The Plainsman and my patrons are eating it up." (Ray S. Hanson of Fertile, Minnesota). A Kansas exhibitor noted, "This series has quite a following [but] I can't quite make my kids believe there are any mountains in Abilene, and that shows up on nearly every episode." (Mayme P. Musselman of Lincoln, Kansas).

The Great Adventures of Wild Bill Hickok firmly established Columbia as a major serial producer, and Gordon Elliott as a western star. Although Elliott had been active in pictures for more than 10 years, this was his first lead and Boxoffice magazine hailed him as a new find: "The role of Wild Bill Hickok is particularly fortunate in being filled by a newcomer, Gordon Elliott. He has a fine speaking voice and is slated for bigger things." The serial was so successful, and Elliott so personable, that Columbia promoted him to starring in his own series of western features, as reported by Film Bulletin: "Larry Darmour is replacing Jack Luden with Gordon Elliott. The change may become permanent." It did become permanent, and Gordon Elliott was rechristened Bill Elliott. His screen character was named "Wild Bill Saunders" and then "Wild Bill Hickok." In addition to his screen name, he gained such trademarks as buckskins, reversed holsters and the catchphrase "I'm a peaceable man," from this serial.

When Columbia re-released the serial in 1949, leading man Elliott was using the name William Elliott; Columbia billed him as such for the reissue.

== Chapter titles ==
1. The Law of the Gun
2. Stampede
3. Blazing Terror
4. Mystery Canyon
5. Flaming Brands
6. The Apache Killer
7. Prowling Wolves
8. The Pit
9. Ambush
10. Savage Vengeance
11. Burning Waters
12. Desperation
13. Phantom Bullets
14. The Lure
15. Trail's End
