= Riding West =

1944 film by William Berke

- Directed by: William Berke
- Screenplay by: Luci Ward
- Starring: Charles Starrett
- Cinematography: Benjamin H. Kline (as Benjamin Kline)
- Edited by: Jerome Thoms
- Color process: Black and white
- Production company: Columbia Pictures
- Distributed by: Columbia Pictures
- Release date: May 18, 1944
- Running time: 58 minutes
- Country: United States
- Language: English

Riding West is a 1944 American Western film directed by William Berke and starring Charles Starrett.

== Plot ==
Steve Jordan (Charles Starrett) is hired by Alexander Morton (Steve Clark) as the head man to get the stations, horses and people in order to provide a mail service from California is Missouri.

== Cast ==
- Charles Starrett as Steve Jordan
- Shirley Patterson as Alice Morton
- Arthur Hunnicutt as Prof. Arkansas Higgins (as Arthur 'Arkansas' Hunnicutt)
- Ernest Tubb as Ernie
- Steve Clark as Alexander Morton
- Wheeler Oakman as Captain Amos Karnes
- Blackie Whiteford as Sgt Dobbs (as J.P. Whiteford)
- Clancy Cooper as Blackburn
- William Wilkerson as Chief Red Eagle (as Bill Wilkerson)
- Ernest Tubb's Singing Cowboys as Riders / Band Member

== See also ==
- List of American films of 1944
