= Driftin' River =

1946 film

- Theatrical release poster
- Directed by: Robert Emmett Tansey
- Screenplay by: Frances Kavanaugh
- Produced by: Robert Emmett Tansey
- Starring: Eddie Dean; Roscoe Ates; Shirley Patterson; Lee Bennett; William Fawcett; Dennis Moore; Lottie Harrison; Robert Callahan; Lee Roberts; Donald Murphy; Forrest Taylor
- Cinematography: Marcel Le Picard
- Edited by: Hugh Winn
- Production company: Producers Releasing Corporation
- Distributed by: Producers Releasing Corporation
- Release date: October 1, 1946
- Running time: 59 minutes
- Country: United States
- Language: English

Driftin' River is a 1946 American Western film directed by Robert Emmett Tansey and written by Frances Kavanaugh. The film stars Eddie Dean, Roscoe Ates, Shirley Patterson, Lee Bennett, William Fawcett, Dennis Moore, Lottie Harrison, Robert Callahan, Lee Roberts, Donald Murphy and Forrest Taylor. The film was released on October 1, 1946, by Producers Releasing Corporation.

== Plot ==
Under government orders, Eddie Dean and his partner Soapy Jones head to J.C. Morgan's ranch to purchase cavalry remounts for the Army, only to discover that J.C. is a woman. The nearby town, Dow City, is in the grip of lawlessness led by Trigger, Clem Kensington, and Joe Morino. Tucson Brown, one of J.C.'s trusted hands, is part of the gang. When Eddie decides to buy horses, Tucson steals the herd to sabotage the sale, resulting in brutal murders of investigating soldiers. The angered townsfolk elect J.C.'s foreman, Tennessee, as sheriff. However, when Tennessee is murdered by outlaws, Eddie, Soapy, and the reformed Tucson unite to take decisive action.

== Cast ==
- Eddie Dean as Eddie Dean
- Roscoe Ates as Soapy Jones
- Shirley Patterson as J. C. 'Jenny' Morgan
- Lee Bennett as Tucson Brown
- William Fawcett as Tennessee
- Dennis Moore as Joe Marino
- Lottie Harrison as Senora
- Robert Callahan as Clem Kensington
- Lee Roberts as Trigger
- Donald Murphy as Captain Rogers
- Forrest Taylor as Major Hammond
- Wylie Grant as Whistling Sam Wade
- Flash as Eddie's Horse
