= The Spirit of Stanford =

1942 film directed by Charles Barton

- Directed by: Charles Barton
- Screenplay by: Howard J. Green; William Brent; Nick Lukats
- Story by: William Brent; Nick Lukats
- Produced by: Sam White
- Starring: Frankie Albert; Marguerite Chapman; Matt Willis; Shirley Patterson; Kay Harris; Robert Kellard
- Cinematography: Franz Planer; John Stumar
- Edited by: James Sweeney
- Production company: Columbia Pictures
- Distributed by: Columbia Pictures
- Release date: October 8, 1942
- Running time: 74 minutes
- Country: United States
- Language: English

The Spirit of Stanford is a 1942 American drama film directed by Charles Barton and written by Howard J. Green, William Brent and Nick Lukats. The film stars Frankie Albert, Marguerite Chapman, Matt Willis, Shirley Patterson, Kay Harris and Robert Kellard. The film was released on October 8, 1942, by Columbia Pictures.

== Cast ==
- Frankie Albert as Frankie Albert
- Marguerite Chapman as Fay Edwards
- Matt Willis as Link Wyman
- Shirley Patterson as June Rogers
- Kay Harris as Edna
- Robert Kellard as Cliff Bonnard
- Ernie Nevers as Ernie Nevers
