= Arthur Hunnicutt =

American actor (1910–1979)

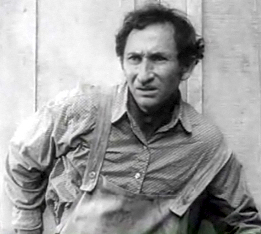
- Hunnicutt in Stars in My Crown (1950)
- Born: Arthur Lee Hunnicutt; February 17, 1910; Gravelly, Arkansas, U.S.
- Died: September 26, 1979 (aged 69); Woodland Hills, Los Angeles, California, U.S.
- Resting place: Coop Prairie Cemetery, Mansfield, Arkansas, U.S.
- Other name: Arthur 'Arkansas' Hunnicutt
- Occupation: Actor
- Years active: 1941–1975
- Spouse(s): Pauline "Pebbles" Lile (m. 1940-his death)

Arthur Lee Hunnicutt (February 17, 1910 – September 26, 1979) was an American actor known for his portrayal of old, wise, grizzled rural characters. He received an Academy Award nomination for Best Supporting Actor for his performance in The Big Sky (1952). He was also known for his role in the Western television series Sugarfoot (1957–1961).

== Early life ==
On February 17, 1910, Hunnicutt was born in Gravelly, Arkansas. He attended the University of Central Arkansas and Arkansas State Teachers College, but dropped out when he ran out of money.

== Career ==
Hunnicutt gained early acting experience in stock theatre and entertained in traveling shows. An article in the September 22, 1940, issue of the Brooklyn Daily Eagle reported, "There isn't a decent-sized medicine show traveling through Kentucky, Illinois, Georgia, Indiana, or Mississippi, nor a stock company touring those states, which hasn't had the name of Arthur Hunnicutt on its programs." After eight years of such activity, in 1936, he enrolled in a drama school in Cleveland to study theatrical techniques for a year.

He moved to Martha's Vineyard, Massachusetts, where he joined a theatre company. Moving to New York City, he worked in the laundry at the Algonquin Hotel for 17 months, then landed roles in Broadway productions. While touring as the lead actor in Tobacco Road, he developed the country character for which he would later be typecast throughout his career. Hunnicutt often found himself cast as a character much older than himself.

Hunnicutt's first film was Wildcat (1942). He appeared in a number of films in the early 1940s, then returned to the stage. In 1949, he returned to Hollywood and resumed his film career. He played a long string of supporting roles—sympathetic, wise, rural types, as in The Red Badge of Courage (1951), The Lusty Men (1952),The Kettles in the Ozarks (1955), The Last Command (1955, as Davy Crockett), The Tall T (1957), Cat Ballou (1965, as Butch Cassidy), El Dorado (1966), and The Adventures of Bullwhip Griffin.

In 1952, he was nominated for an Academy Award for Best Supporting Actor in the Howard Hawks film The Big Sky.

Throughout the 1950s, '60s, and '70s, Hunnicutt made nearly 40 guest appearances on American television programs. He made two memorable appearances on Perry Mason; in 1963, he played orange grower Amos Kennesaw Mountain Keller in "The Case of the Golden Oranges" and prospector Sandy Bowen in "The Case of the Drowsy Mosquito". He also made guest appearances on Bonanza, Cheyenne, Gunsmoke, The Outer Limits, The Rifleman, Wanted: Dead or Alive, The Andy Griffith Show, My Three Sons, The Wild Wild West, Adam-12, and The Twilight Zone. In Moonrunners (1975), one of his later movies and the precursor to The Dukes of Hazzard, he played the original Uncle Jesse.

In his later years, Hunnicutt served as honorary mayor of Northridge, California. He developed tongue cancer.

== Death ==
On September 27, 1979, Hunnicutt died of cancer at the Motion Picture & Television Country House and Hospital at age 69. He was buried in the Coop Prairie Cemetery in Mansfield, Arkansas.

== Filmography ==
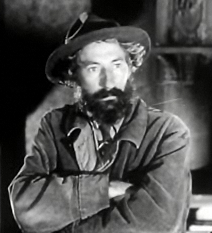
Split Second (1953)

Year	Title	Role	Notes
1942	Wildcat	'Watchfob' Jones	
1942	Riding Through Nevada	Arkansas	
1942	Silver Queen	Newspaper Publisher Brett	
1942	Fall In	Luke Hatfield	
1942	Pardon My Gun	Arkansas	
1943	The Fighting Buckaroo	Arkansas	
1943	Law of the Northwest	Arkansas	
1943	Frontier Fury	Arkansas	
1943	Robin Hood of the Range	Arkansas	
1943	Johnny Come Lately	Second Tramp	
1943	Hail to the Rangers	Arkansas	
1943	The Chance of a Lifetime	Elwood 'Tex' Stewart	uncredited
1944	Riding West	Prof. Arkansas Higgins	
1944	Abroad with Two Yanks	Arkie	
1945	Murder, He Says	Townsman	uncredited
1949	Lust for Gold	Ludi	uncredited
1949	The Great Dan Patch	Chet Williams	
1949	Pinky	Police Chief Anderson	uncredited
1949	Border Incident	Clayton Nordell	
1950	Stars in My Crown	Chloroform Wiggins	
1950	A Ticket To Tomahawk	Sad Eyes	
1950	Broken Arrow	Milt Duffield, Mail Superintendent	
1950	The Furies	Cowhand	uncredited
1950	Two Flags West	Sgt. Pickens	
1951	Sugarfoot	Fly-Up-the-Creek Jones	
1951	Passage West	Pop Brennan	
1951	The Red Badge of Courage	Bill Porter	
1951	Distant Drums	Monk	
1952	She Couldn't Say No	Odie Chalmers	
1952	The Big Sky	Zeb Calloway / Narrator	Academy Award nominee, Best Supporting Actor
1952	The Lusty Men	Booker Davis	
1953	Split Second	Asa Tremaine	
1953	Devil's Canyon	Frank Taggert	
1953	The French Line	'Waco' Mosby	
1954	Beautiful but Dangerous	Otey	
1955	The Last Command	Davy Crockett	
1956	The Kettles in the Ozarks	Sedgewick Kettle	
1956	Cheyenne	Hoot Hollister	episode: "Death Deals the Hand"
1957	The Tall T	Ed Rintoon	
1958	Born Reckless	Cool Man	
1959–1969	Bonanza	Paiute Scroggs / Obie / Salty Hubbard	4 episodes
1960	The Rifleman	Nathaniel Cameron	episode: "The Grasshopper"
1960	The Andy Griffith Show	Jedediah Wakefield	episode: "A Feud Is a Feud"
1961	My Three Sons	George, The Pony Ride Cowboy	episode: "The Horseless Saddle"
1961	Laramie	Earl Droody	episode: "Wolf Cub"
1961	The Donna Reed Show	Old Man	episode: "One of Those Days"
1962	The Twilight Zone	Hyder Simpson	episode: "The Hunt"
1963	The Cardinal	Sheriff Dubrow	
1963	Perry Mason	Amos Kenesaw Mountain Keller	episode: "The Case of the Golden Oranges"
1963	Perry Mason	Sandy Bowen	episode: "The Case of the Drowsy Mosquito"
1964	A Tiger Walks	Frank Lewis	
1964	The Outer Limits	Lamont	episode: "Cry of Silence"
1965	Wagon Train	Deets	episode: "The Jarbo Pierce Story"
1965	Cat Ballou	Butch Cassidy	
1965	Apache Uprising	Bill Gibson	
1966	El Dorado	Bull Harris	
1967	The Adventures of Bullwhip Griffin	The Refereeing	
1967	The Wild Wild West	Doc Gavin	episode: "The Night of the Colonel's Ghost"
1971	The Million Dollar Duck	Mr. Purdham	
1971	Shoot Out	Homer Page (rancher)	
1972	The Revengers	Free State	
1974	Mrs. Sundance	Walt Putney	
1974	Harry and Tonto	Wade Carlton	
1974	The Spikes Gang	Kid White (aka Billy Blanco)	
1975	Moonrunners	Uncle Jesse	
1975	Winterhawk	McClusky	
