= Lucky Legs =

1942 film directed by Charles Barton

- Theatrical release poster
- Directed by: Charles Barton
- Screenplay by: Stanley Rubin; Jack Hartfield
- Produced by: Wallace MacDonald
- Starring: Jinx Falkenburg; Leslie Brooks; Kay Harris; Russell Hayden; Elizabeth Patterson; William Wright
- Cinematography: Philip Tannura
- Edited by: Art Seid
- Production company: Columbia Pictures
- Distributed by: Columbia Pictures
- Release date: October 1, 1942
- Running time: 64 minutes
- Country: United States
- Language: English

Lucky Legs is a 1942 American comedy film directed by Charles Barton and written by Stanley Rubin and Jack Hartfield. The film stars Jinx Falkenburg, Leslie Brooks, Kay Harris, Russell Hayden, Elizabeth Patterson and William Wright. The film was released on October 1, 1942, by Columbia Pictures.

== Plot ==
Chorus girl Gloria Carroll inherits one million dollars from Broadway playboy Herbert Dinwiddle. Producer Ned McLane persuades her to advance him the money on a production called "Lucky Legs" that will star her. The will causes problems in two places; Racketeer Pinky Connors is mad as the money is his as Dinwiddle was really his absconding bookkeeper, and, in Elmville, Dinwiddle's two spinster sisters, Annabelle Dinwiddle and Henrietta Dinwiddle, learn they are getting $10,000 each. Pinkie's lawyer suggests he get power-of-attorney over Gloria's funds. Henrietta wants to contest the will, hires a local young law school graduate, Jimmy Abercrombie and the trio set off for New York. Jimmy obtains an injunction against Pinkie that also serves to shut off McLane's credit for "Lucky Legs." To open the show and provide employment for her roommates, "Calamity" Jane Edwards and Jewel Perkins, Gloria offers to settle for $25,000 with Henrietta, who refuses. Annebelle, who likes Gloria, arranges for Pinkie to kidnap her, the ransom being Henrietta's withdrawal of her half of the injunction. Pinkie's henchmen make a mistake and kidnap Annabelle instead.

== Cast ==
- Jinx Falkenburg as Gloria Carroll
- Leslie Brooks as Jewel Perkins
- Kay Harris as 'Calamity' Jane Edwards
- Russell Hayden as James Abercrombie
- Elizabeth Patterson as Annabelle Dinwiddie
- William Wright as Pemberton 'Pinkie' Connors
- Don Beddoe as Ned McLane
- Adele Rowland as Hettie Dinwiddie
- Eddie Marr as Mike Manley
- George McKay as Rod Fenton
- James C. Morton as Pat
- Eddie Kane as J.N. Peters
