= Roscoe Ates =

American actor (1895–1962)

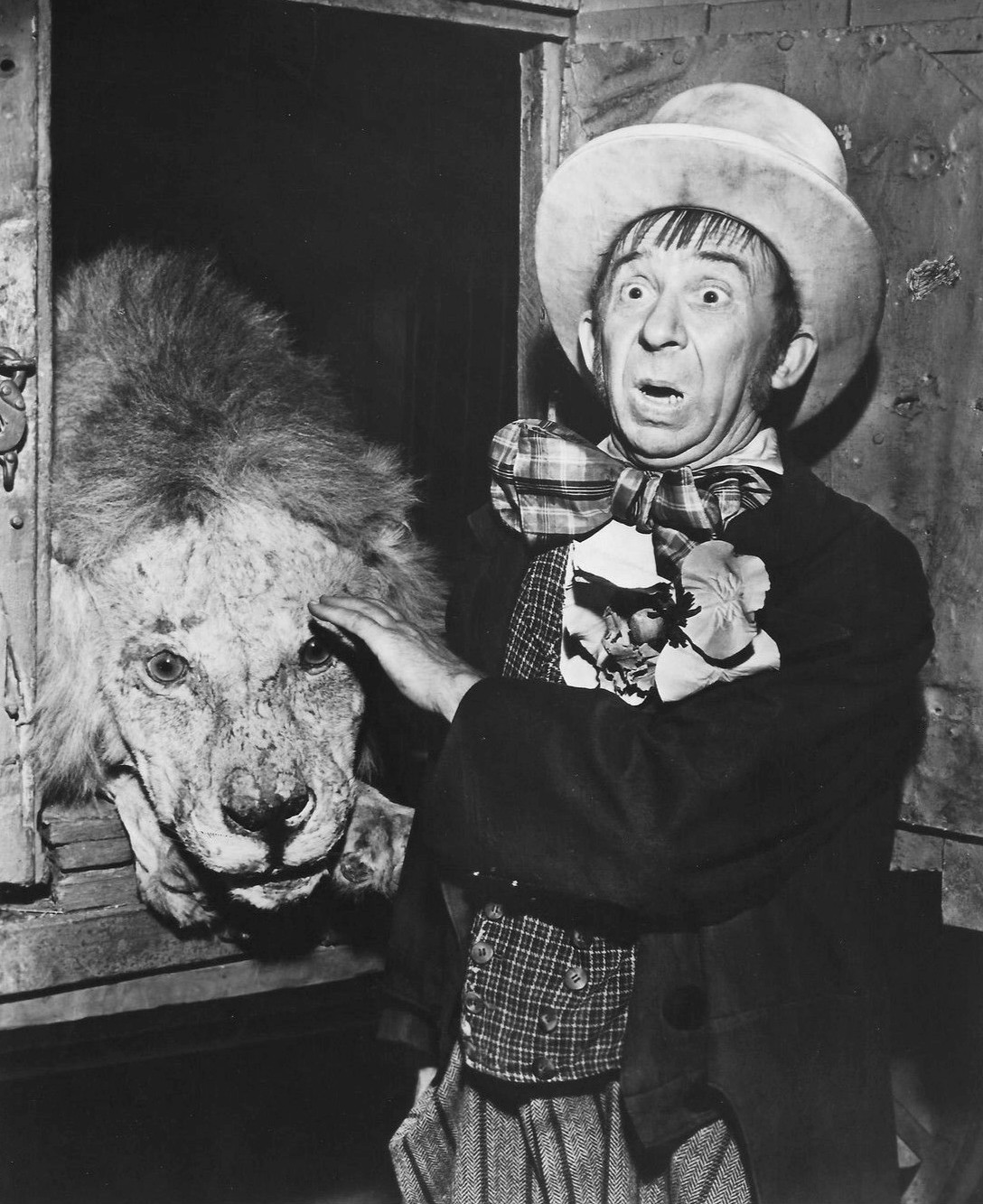
- Ates in Chad Hanna (1940)
- Born: Roscoe Blevel Ates; January 20, 1895; Grange, Mississippi, U.S.
- Died: March 1, 1962 (aged 67); Los Angeles, California, U.S.
- Resting place: Forest Lawn Memorial Park, Glendale, California
- Occupations: Actor; stage performer; comedian; vaudevillian; musician
- Years active: 1929–1961
- Spouses: Clara Callahan (m. 1923; div. 1945) Leonore Belle Jumps (m. 1949; died 1955) Beatrice Angelina Naranjo (m. 1960)

Roscoe Blevel Ates (January 20, 1895 – March 1, 1962) was an American vaudeville performer, actor of stage and screen, comedian and musician who primarily featured in western films and television. He was best known as western character Soapy Jones. He was also billed as Rosco Ates.

== Early years ==
Ates was born on January 20, 1895, in the northwest of Hattiesburg, Mississippi, in the rural hamlet of Grange (Grange is no longer included on road maps). Ates spent much of his childhood learning how to manage a speech impediment, succeeding when he was 18.

== Early career ==
Ates played violin to accompany silent films at a theater in Chickasha, Oklahoma. Following that experience, he became an entertainer as a concert violinist but found economic opportunities greater as a vaudeville comedian, appearing as half of the team of Ates and Darling. For 15 years, he was a headliner on the Orpheum Circuit, and he revived his long-gone stutter for humorous effect

== Military service ==
Ates served in World War II, training of the Air Force fighter squad program in Houston at Ellington Field Texas.

== Theater and personal appearances ==
On Broadway, Ates appeared as James McCracken in the musical comedy Sea Legs (1937).

In the late 1930s, Ates made a personal appearance tour in Scotland and England. He also toured selected American cities with Hollywood Scandals, a stage revue with 35 people.

== Film career ==
His first film role was a ship's cook in South Sea Rose. The next year he was cast as "Old Stuff" in the widescreen film Billy the Kid starring Wallace Beery. Here is a listing of his films:

- South Sea Rose (1929) as Ship's Cook
- Marianne (1929) as Orderly (uncredited)
- City Girl (1930) as Reaper
- Double Cross Roads (1930) as Ticket Agent (uncredited)
- Caught Short (1930) Bit Part (uncredited)
- The Big House (1930) as Putnam
- Check and Double Check (1930) as Brother Arthur
- Love in the Rough (1930) as Proprietor
- Soup to Nuts (1930) as Pants Presser at Al's Tailor Shop (uncredited)
- Those Three French Girls (1930) as Elmer (uncredited)
- Billy the Kid (1930) as Old Stuff
- Remote Control (1930) as Stuttering Piccolo Player (uncredited)
- Cimarron (1931) as Jesse Rickey
- The Champ (1931) as Sponge
- Politics (1931) as Peter Higgins, the town barber
- Reducing (1931) as Stuttering Ticket Agent (uncredited)
- A Free Soul (1931) as Man Shot at in Men's Room (uncredited)
- The Great Lover (1931) as Roscoe
- Too Many Cooks (1931) as Mr. Wilson
- She Went for a Tramp (Short) (1931)
- The Voice of Hollywood Number 7 (Second Series) (Short) (1931)
- Cut It Out, Doctor (Short) (1931)
- Use Your Noodle (Short) (1931)
- A Clean-Up on the Burb (Short) (1931)
- The Lone Starved Ranger (Short) (1931) as Roscoe, the Stuttering Man
- The Big Shot (1931) as Rusty, the Barber
- The Rainbow Trail (1932) as Ike Wilkins
- Come On Danger! (1932) as Rusty
- Renegades of the West (1932) as Dr. Henry Fawcett
- Freaks (1932) as Roscoe
- The Roadhouse Murder (1932) as Edmund Joyce
- Ladies of the Jury (1932) as Andrew MacKaig
- Never the Twins Shall Meet (1932) as Alfred Guppy / Albert Guppy
- Young Bride (1932) as Mike, the Pool Hall Bartender
- Hold 'Em Jail (1932) as Slippery Sam Brown
- Sham Poo, the Magician (1932) as Roscoe / Tourist
- Deported (1932)
- Lucky Devils (1933) as Gabby
- What! No Beer? (1933) as Schultz the Brewmaster
- Alice in Wonderland (1933) as Fish
- The Cheyenne Kid (1933) as Bush
- The Past of Mary Holmes (1933) as Bill-Poster Klondike
- King Kong (1933) as Press Photographer (uncredited)
- Scarlet River (1933) as Ulysses Mope
- Golden Harvest (1933) as Louis Jenkins aka Loopey Lou
- She Made Her Bed (1934) as Santa Fe
- Merry Wives of Reno (1934) as The Trapper
- Woman in the Dark (1934) as Tommy Logan
- Dizzy and Daffy (1934) as 'Call-'Em-Wrong Jones', the Umpire
- So You Won't T-T-T-Talk (1934) as Elmer Whipple
- The People's Enemy (1935) as Slip Laflin
- Why Pay Rent? (Short) (1935) as Elmer Whipple
- Once Over Lightly (Short) (1935)
- On the Wagon (1935) as Elmer
- Fair Exchange (1936) as Elmer Goodge
- God's Country and the Woman (1937) as Gander Hopkins
- Drug Store Follies (Short) (1937) as The Stuttering Comic
- Alpine Cabaret (Short) (1937) as Elmer
- The Great Adventures of Wild Bill Hickok (1938) as Oscar "Snake-Eyes" Smith
- Riders of the Black Hills (1938) as Sheriff Brown
- Gone with the Wind (1939) as a convalescing Confederate soldier. While scratching his back on a tent pole, he utters the line "These animules is driving me crazy!"
- Three Texas Steers (1939) as Sheriff Brown
- Rancho Grande (1940) as Tex
- You're Next! (1940) as Mr. Tillson (uncredited)
- The Cowboy from Sundown (1940) as Deputy Gloomy Day
- Captain Caution (1940) as Chips
- Chad Hanna (1940) as Ike Wayfish
- Untamed (1940) as Bert Dillon
- I Want a Divorce (1940) as Process Server (uncredited)
- Fireman, Save My Choo Choo (Short) (1940) as Fireman
- Bad Men of Missouri (1941) as Lafe
- Sullivan's Travels (1941) as Hollywood Diner Counterman (uncredited)
- I'll Sell My Life (1941) as Happy Hogan
- Robin Hood of the Pecos (1941) as Jailer Guffy
- She Knew All the Answers (1941) as Gas Station Attendant
- Glove Affair (Short) (1941) as Uncle Tom
- Ziegfeld Girl (1941) as Janitor Changing Pictures (uncredited)
- Mountain Moonlight (1941) as Gardener
- Reg'lar Fellers (1941) as Emory McQuade
- Birth of the Blues (1941) as Cab Driver (uncredited)
- One Foot in Heaven (1941) as George Reynolds (uncredited)
- The Palm Beach Story (1942) as Fourth Member, Ale and Quail Club
- The Affairs of Jimmy Valentine (1942) as Dan Kady
- Can't Help Singing (1944) as Lemuel (uncredited)
- The Great Moment (1944) as Morton's Sign Painter (uncredited)
- Wild West (1946) as Soapy Jones
- Colorado Serenade (1946) as Soapy
- Driftin' River (1946) as Soapy Jones
- Stars Over Texas (1946) as Soapy Jones
- Tumbleweed Trail (1946) as Soapy Jones
- West to Glory (1947) as Soapy Jones
- Shadow Valley (1947) as Soapy Jones
- Wild Country (1947) as Soapy Jones
- Range Beyond the Blue (1947) as Soapy Jones
- Black Hills (1947) as Soapy Jones
- Check Your Guns (1948) as Soapy Jones
- The Hawk of Powder River (1948) as Soapy Jones
- The Westward Trail (1948) as Soapy Jones
- Tornado Range (1948) as Soapy Jones
- The Tioga Kid (1948) as Soapy Jones
- Thunder in the Pines (1948) as Wheezer, Boomer's Head Logger
- Inner Sanctum (1948) as Willie
- Father's Wild Game (1950) as Rancher
- Hills of Oklahoma (1950) as Dismal, the Cook
- Honeychile (1951) as Bob
- The Blazing Forest (1952) as Beans
- Trail Guide (1952) as Stammering Man (uncredited)
- Those Redheads from Seattle (1953) as Dan Taylor
- The Stranger Wore a Gun (1953) as Jake Hooper, the Stage Driver (uncredited)
- Abbott and Costello Meet the Keystone Kops (1955) as Wagon Driver
- Lucy Gallant (1955) as Clem Anderson, the Hotel Clerk (uncredited)
- Meet Me in Las Vegas (1956) as Scotty (uncredited)
- Come Next Spring (1956) as Shorty Wilkins
- The Birds and the Bees (1956) as Vendor (uncredited)
- The Kettles in the Ozarks (1956) as Townsman (uncredited)
- The Big Caper (1957) as Falkenburg (uncredited)
- Short Cut to Hell (1957) as Road Driver (uncredited)
- The Sheepman (1958) as Town Loafer (uncredited)
- Cissie (TV Movie) (1959) as Papa
- The Silent Call (1961) as Sid
- The Ladies Man (1961) as Pet Shop Owner
- The Errand Boy (1961) as Ralph the Prop Man (uncredited)

== Musical performances ==
Ates performed these songs in his films:

- Billy the Kid: "Turkey in the Straw" (1930)
- Remote Control: "The Wedding March" (1930)
- Renegades of the West: "Farmer in the Dell" (1932)
- Rancho Grande: "Dude Ranch Cow Hands" (uncredited, 1938)
- Cowboy from Sundown: "The Craw-dad Song" (1940)
- Captain Caution: "Hilda" (1940)
- Colorado Serenade: "Home on the Range" (1946)
- Driftin' River: "Way Back in Oklahoma" (1946)
- Wild West, also known as Prairie Outlaw: Song, "Elmer, The Knock-Kneed Cowboy" (1946)

== Television career ==
In 1950, Ates appeared in his first television role as Deputy Roscoe on ABC series The Marshal of Gunsight Pass.

Ates appeared on television in multiple roles. He was cast as Henry Wilson in the episode "The Census Taker" of the syndicated western series The Cisco Kid, and he also appeared that same year in the Gale Storm sitcom, My Little Margie and Boston Blackie. He appeared on Gail Davis's Annie Oakley series as Curly Dawes, the telegraph operator.

In 1958, Ates was cast as "Old Timer" in the episode "The Sacramento Story" of NBC's Wagon Train. In 1959, Ates appeared in western series The Restless Gun, State Trooper, and Buckskin. He had a nameless role as a barfly in the 1958 episode of "Maverick" called "Gun-Shy", a spoof of the series Gunsmoke. In 1960, he was cast as Fenton in the episode "Hot Ice Cream" of Charles Bronson's ABC series Man with a Camera, as Lou Nugget in "The Fabulous Fiddle" of Scott Brady's syndicated Shotgun Slade, and as Deputy Boak in "The Missing Queen" of Andrew Duggan's ABC crime drama Bourbon Street Beat, set in New Orleans.

== Later roles ==
From 1958 to 1960, Ates appeared five times on CBS's Alfred Hitchcock Presents mystery series.

In 1960, Ates appeared as a guest in the presentation of the life story of honorary Hollywood mayor Johnny Grant on NBC's This Is Your Life biography series with host Ralph Edwards.

Ates's last credited roles were in 1961 as a drunk in Robert Stack's ABC series The Untouchables and as sheriffs in The Red Skelton Show. His final screen appearance in Jerry Lewis's 1961 film The Errand Boy was uncredited.

== Family and death ==
Ates was married three times. After his divorce from the former Clara Callahan, he married Leonore Belle Jumps in 1949. She died in 1955. In December 1960, Ates married model Beatrice Heisser.

Ates died of lung cancer at the age of 67 at the West Valley Community Hospital in Encino, California.

== Television appearances ==
- The Marshal of Gunsight Pass (1950) (Season 1 Episode 1) as Deputy Roscoe
- The Marshal of Gunsight Pass (1950) (Season 1 Episode 15: "Shotgun Messenger") as Deputy Roscoe
- The Marshal of Gunsight Pass (1950) (Season 1 Episode 22) as Deputy Roscoe
- My Little Margie (1953) (Season 2 Episode 12: "Hillbilly Margie") as Zeke
- Big Town (1953) (Season 3 Episode 25: "Lynch Law") as Ed Crowley
- Boston Blackie (1953) (Season 2 Episode 30: "Grab Bag") as Professor Edgar Franklin
- Schlitz Playhouse (1953) (Season 3 Episode 5: "The Prize") as Emil
- The Mickey Rooney Show (1954) (Season 1 Episode 2: "The Moon or Bust") as Henry
- The Adventures of Champion (1955) (Season 1 Episode 20: "The Real Unfriendly Ghost") as Canary Twigg
- Annie Oakley (TV series) (1956) (Season 3 Episode 10: "Showdown at Diablo") as Telegrapher Curly Dawes
- Annie Oakley (TV series) (1957) (Season 3 Episode 31: "Annie and the Miser") as Neighborly Walsh
- The Adventures of Rin Tin Tin (1957) (Season 3 Episode 20: "Sorrowful Joe Returns") as Jorgenson
- Schlitz Playhouse (1958) (Season 7 Episode 36: "Long Distance")
- Death Valley Days (1958) (Season 6 Episode 19: "Cockeyed Charlie Parkhurst") as Pop McCrary
- M Squad (1958) (Season 2 Episode 6: "Force of Habit") as Edwin Winkler
- The Restless Gun (1958) (Season 1 Episode 36: "More Than Kin") as Hotel Clerk
- Wagon Train (1958) (Season 1 Episode 39: "The Sacramento Story") as Old Timer
- Tales of Wells Fargo (1958) (Season 2 Episode 29: "The Newspaper") as Flanny the Typesetter
- Sugarfoot (1958) (Season 1 Episode 14: "A Wreath for Charity Lloyd") as Old Timer (uncredited)
- Alfred Hitchcock Presents (1958) (Season 3 Episode 33: "Post Mortem") as Cemetery Clerk
- Alfred Hitchcock Presents (1958) (Season 4 Episode 3: "The Jokester") as Pop Henderson
- Alfred Hitchcock Presents (1958) (Season 4 Episode 11: "And the Desert Shall Blossom") as Ben White
- The Restless Gun (1959) (Season 2 Episode 15: "The Painted Beauty") as Juniper Dunlap
- Wagon Train (1959) (Season 2 Episode 29: "The Clara Duncan Story") as Joe the Bartender (uncredited)
- Tales of Wells Fargo (1959) (Season 4 Episode 14: "Long Odds") as Spoon
- Lux Playhouse (1959) (Season 1 Episode 9: "Deathtrap")
- Buckskin (TV series) (1959) (Season 1 Episode 29: "A Well of Gold") as Harrison
- State Trooper (TV series) (1959) (Season 3 Episode 11: "The Man from Solitary") as Dusty Peabody
- Sugarfoot (1959) (Season 3 Episode 3: "MacBrewster the Bold") as Lew Long
- Lawman (1959) (Season 1 Episode 24: "The Visitor") as Old Timer
- Lawman (1959) (Season 1 Episode 26: "The Gang") as Ike the Townsman
- Lawman (1959) (Season 1 Episode 34: "The Ring") as Ike Jenkins
- Lawman (1959) (Season 1 Episode 39: "The Friend") as Ike Jenkins
- Lawman (1959) (Season 2 Episode 4: "The Exchange") as Ike Jenkins
- Lawman (1959) (Season 2 Episode 6: "The Breakup") as Ike Jenkins
- Maverick (TV series) (1959) (Season 2 Episode 16: "Gun-Shy") as Barfly
- Maverick (TV series) (1959) (Season 2 Episode 17: "Two Beggars on Horseback") as Kibitzer
- Maverick (TV series) (1959) (Season 2 Episode 24: "Two Tickets to Ten Strike") as Joe the Barber
- Alfred Hitchcock Presents (1959) (Season 5 Episode 11: "Road Hog") as Tavern Customer
- Sugarfoot (1960) (Season 4 Episode 3: "Man from Medora") as Barber
- Lawman (1960) (Season 2 Episode 15: "The Stranger") as Ike Jenkins
- Lawman (1960) (Season 2 Episode 36: "Man on a Mountain") as Ike Jenkins
- Maverick (TV series) (1960) (Season 4 Episode 2: "Hadley's Hunters") as Albert
- Alfred Hitchcock Presents (1960) (Season 5 Episode 25: "The Little Man Who Was There") as Piano Player
- Alfred Hitchcock Presents (1960) (Season 6 Episode 7: "Outlaw in Town") as Zack Martin
- Man with a Camera (1960) (Season 2 Episode 12: "Hot Ice Cream") as Fenton
- Shotgun Slade (1960) (Season 1 Episode 29: "The Fabulous Fiddle") as Lou Nugget
- Bourbon Street Beat (1960) (Season 1 Episode 23: "The Missing Queen") as Deputy Boak
- Surfside 6 (1960) (Season 1 Episode 6: "Par-a-kee") as Clem (uncredited)
- Outlaws (TV series) (1960) (Season 1 Episode 4: "The Rape of Red Sky") as Bartender
- Outlaws (TV series) (1961) (Season 1 Episode 23: "Sam Bass") as Old Timer (uncredited)
- The Untouchables (TV series) (1961) (Season 2 Episode 17: "Augie 'The Banker' Ciamino") as Drunk
- Whispering Smith (TV series) (1961) (Season 1 Episode 9: "Three for One") as Sheriff Ben Stanley
- The Red Skelton Hour (1961) (Season 10 Episode 29: "Candid Clem with guest stars Gene Autry and Champion) as Sheriff
