= Russ Westover =

American cartoonist (1886–1966)

- Born: Russell Channing Westover; March 8, 1886; Los Angeles, California, U.S.
- Died: May 3, 1966 (aged 80); San Rafael, California, U.S.
- Occupation: Cartoonist
- Known for: Tillie the Toiler

Russell Channing Westover (March 8, 1886 – May 3, 1966) was an American cartoonist best known for his long-run comic strip Tillie the Toiler.

== Early life ==
Russ Westover's Tillie the Toiler (June 25, 1939)

Westover was born in Los Angeles, California. He recalled, "When the time came... to make a living, father put me in one of the stores he owned. I used to wrap parcels, and I'd draw pictures on them. The customers liked it, but my father didn't. We talked it over and came to an agreement. I went into the railroad business."

After a job as a clerk with the Southern Pacific Railroad, Westover headed for San Francisco, where he studied at the Mark Hopkins Institute of Art (now the San Francisco Art Institute). After four months, he dropped out after an instructor said, "Young man, the drawing of Caesar is good, but that caricature you made of me on the border is terrible".

== Career ==
Westover was 18 years old when he landed a job as a sports cartoonist with the San Francisco Bulletin. He also contributed to the San Francisco Chronicle, the San Francisco Post and the Oakland Herald. His first comic strip, Daffy Dan, about a baseball player, was published in the Post.

Relocating to New York, he was at the New York Herald when he drew his first nationally syndicated strip, Snapshot Bill (1914), followed by Ginger Pop, Fat Chance, Looie and His Tin Lizzie and The Demon Demonstrator. He also worked as an illustrator for Life and Judge (1918–21).

=== Tillie the Toiler ===
Russ Westover, Hugh Herbert and Otto Soglow look over the comics section of the April 10, 1938 edition of the Los Angeles Examiner.

Westover worked on his concept of a flapper character in a strip he titled Rose of the Office. With a title change to Tillie the Toiler, it sold to King Features Syndicate. Leaving the Herald, he began Tillie the Toiler for King Features in 1921, and the working-girl strip quickly established a wide readership, leading to a 1927 film adaptation by Hearst's Cosmopolitan Pictures with Marion Davies as Tillie.

During the late 1920s, more than 600 papers were carrying Tillie The Toiler. In 1926, he added another strip, The Van Swaggers, to his Sunday page as a topper. Cupples & Leon published a series of at least eight Tillie the Toiler reprint collections beginning in the 1920s and continuing into the 1930s. Westover profited from another movie when Kay Harris appeared in the title role of Columbia Pictures' Tillie the Toiler in 1941.

When Westover retired in the early 1950s, Bob Gustafson continued Tillie the Toiler until 1959.

== Death ==
Westover was 80 when he died in 1966 in San Rafael, California.
