= Frontier Fury (1943 film) =

1943 film by William Berke

- Directed by: William Berke
- Screenplay by: Betty Burbridge
- Story by: Betty Burbridge
- Produced by: Jack Fier
- Starring: Charles Starrett
- Cinematography: Benjamin H. Kline
- Edited by: Jerome Thoms
- Color process: Black and white
- Production company: Columbia Pictures
- Distributed by: Columbia Pictures
- Release date: June 24, 1943
- Running time: 55 minutes
- Country: United States
- Language: English

Frontier Fury is a 1943 American Western directed by William Berke and starring Charles Starrett.

== Plot ==
In this western, a decent Indian agent loses his job and his good name after someone steals the government money he was to deliver to a tribe. Because he cannot bear to see the people starve over the long winter, he begins searching for the robbers. He does so by looking for the unusual coins that been included in the payroll.

== Cast ==
- Charles Starrett as Steve Langdon
- Roma Aldrich as Stella Larkin
- Arthur Hunnicutt as Arkansas Tuttle (as Arthur 'Arkansas' Hunnicutt)
- Jimmie Davis as Jimmie Davis
- Jimmie Davis and His Singing Buckaroos as Musicians
