= Kay Harris =

American actress

- Born: August 18, 1919; Elkhorn, Wisconsin, United States
- Died: October 23, 1971 (aged 52); California, United States
- Occupation: Actress
- Years active: 1941–1943 (film)

Kay Harris (August 18, 1919 – October 23, 1971) was an American actress who starred in eight films during the 1940s, including the title role in Tillie the Toiler.

Harris was the daughter of Mr. and Mrs. James L. Harris. In 1937 she graduated from Elkhorn High School in Wisconsin, where she had been active in dramatics. She acted in summer stock theater for two years after graduation. She obtained a job at radio station WSAI in Cincinnati, Ohio. In Cincinnati she met Penny Singleton, whose husband urged Harris to take a screen test in Hollywood.

She was married to Army aviator Charles A. Peters until January 24, 1942, when they were divorced. On that same day she married cinematographer Henry Freulich. In January 1943, they separated, and Harris said that she planned to get a divorce.

== Filmography ==
- Tillie the Toiler (1941)
- Parachute Nurse (1942)
- Lucky Legs (1942)
- Sabotage Squad (1942)
- Smith of Minnesota (1942)
- The Spirit of Stanford (1942)
- Robin Hood of the Range (1943)
- The Fighting Buckaroo (1943)

== Bibliography ==
- Blottner, Gene. Columbia Pictures Movie Series, 1926-1955: The Harry Cohn Years. McFarland, 2011.
