= Jack Fier =

American film producer

- Born: November 8, 1896; Brooklyn, New York
- Died: March 3, 1966 (aged 69); Los Angeles
- Occupation: Film producer
- Years active: 1936–1965

Jack Fier (November 8, 1896 – March 3, 1966) was an American film producer. He worked on more than 140 films, exclusively for Columbia Pictures, between 1936 and 1952. One final film, released in 1965 by United Artists, was made with former Columbia colleagues.

Jack Fier was the tough, efficient head of low-budget film production at Columbia, and he seldom got his name on the screen. Hollywood columnist and biographer Bob Thomas described him as "the aggressive little production manager Jack Fier, a relentless man with a galvanic voice." His first assignment came in 1936: he represented Columbia while one of its Charles Starrett westerns was being filmed in Canada by an independent studio. Columbia was then complying with a 1936 Canadian law that required that American studios must use Canadian personnel in some of their films, in order to release the rest of their American films in Canada.

Fier was soon placed in charge of the studio's new serial unit, and was responsible for three hit chapter plays: The Great Adventures of Wild Bill Hickok, The Spider's Web, and Mandrake the Magician. He continued to oversee the Charles Starrett westerns, and began receiving screen credit in 1941. Fier was promoted to production manager in 1945, working closely with studio head Harry Cohn.

Jack Fier was still responsible for the less important Columbia releases, but as Cohn's assistant he did take a hand in some of the important pictures. When Orson Welles was filming The Lady from Shanghai in 1947, he told Fier on a Friday that he wanted to have an entire interior set repainted over the weekend so he could resume filming on Monday. Fier flatly refused, explaining that the weekend overtime rates stipulated by the painters' union would be much too expensive. Welles went ahead with his plans anyway, breaking into the studio's paint supply and repainting the set himself, with the help of some friends. Their finishing touch was a hand-painted banner reading, "The Only Thing We Have to Fear Is Fier Himself". On Monday morning, union painters confronted Fier, picketed the studio, and demanded the weekend overtime they would have gotten. Fier settled the problem quickly by paying the demand, but charged the amount to Orson Welles personally. Fier then instructed the union painters to paint another banner for the set: "All's Well That Ends Welles."

Jack Fier retired in 1952 after producing a season's worth of westerns starring Charles Starrett. Fier came out of retirement in 1964 to manage the production of How to Murder Your Wife (released 1965), starring erstwhile Columbia star Jack Lemmon and former Columbia director Richard Quine.

== Selected filmography ==
- Secret Patrol (1936, filmed in Canada)
- The Secret of Treasure Island (1938, serial)
- The Great Adventures of Wild Bill Hickok (1938, serial)
- The Spider's Web (1938, serial)
- Smashing the Spy Ring (1938)
- Flying G-Men (1939, serial)
- Mandrake the Magician (1939, serial)
- Overland with Kit Carson (1939, serial)
- Cafe Hostess (1940)
- Nobody's Children (1940)
- Sweetheart of the Campus (1941)
- The Pinto Kid (1941)
- The Blonde from Singapore (1941)
- Secrets of the Lone Wolf (1941)
- Pardon My Gun (1942)
- Stand By All Networks (1942)
- Frontier Fury (1943)
- Doughboys in Ireland (1943)
- Sergeant Mike (1944)
- Kill the Umpire (1950)
- Smoky Canyon (1952)
