= Broadway Bill =

1934 film by Frank Capra

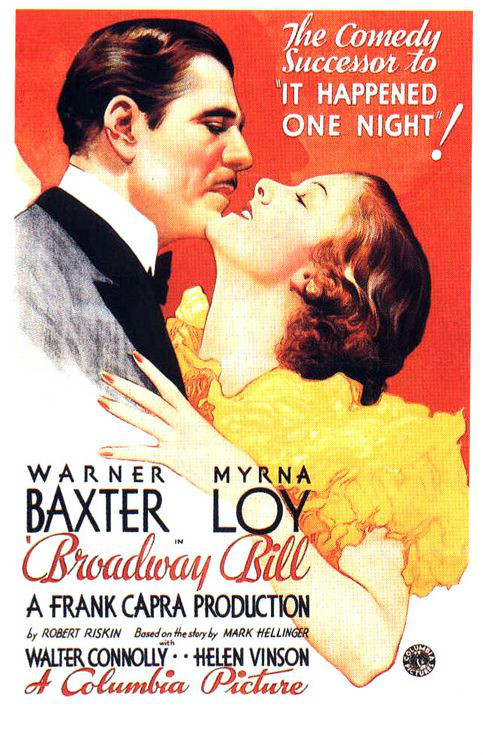
- Theatrical release poster
- Directed by: Frank Capra
- Screenplay by: Robert Riskin
- Based on: "Strictly Confidential" by Mark Hellinger
- Produced by: Frank Capra
- Starring: Warner Baxter; Myrna Loy
- Cinematography: Joseph Walker
- Edited by: Gene Havlick
- Production company: Columbia Pictures
- Distributed by: Columbia Pictures
- Release dates: November 30, 1934 (New York, premiere); December 27, 1934 (USA)
- Running time: 102 minutes
- Country: United States
- Language: English
- Box office: $668,900 (U.S. and Canada rentals)

Broadway Bill is a 1934 American comedy-drama film directed by Frank Capra and starring Warner Baxter and Myrna Loy. Screenplay by Robert Riskin and based on the short story "Strictly Confidential" by Mark Hellinger, the film is about a man's love for his thoroughbred race horse and the woman who helps him achieve his dreams. Capra disliked the final product, and in an effort to make it more to his liking, he remade the film in 1950 as Riding High. In later years, the distributor of Riding High, Paramount Pictures, acquired the rights to Broadway Bill. The film was released in the United Kingdom as Strictly Confidential.

Broadway Bill was filmed between June 18 and August 16, 1934, at Columbia Studios in Hollywood, and on location at Tanforan Racetrack in San Bruno, Warner Bros. Ranch, and the Pacific Coast Steel Mills. After an initial preview on October 24, Capra re-edited some scenes based upon audience reaction. The film premiered on November 30, 1934, in New York City, and was released in the United States on December 27, 1934. The film received positive reviews, with Andre Sennwald in The New York Times calling it "sly and impertinent screen comedy, painlessly whimsical and completely engaging".

== Plot ==
Dan Brooks runs a paper-box factory for his father-in-law, J.L. Higgins, who owns most of the major business interests in Higginsville. Uninspired by his factory position, Dan devotes his time and energy to training his thoroughbred race horse, Broadway Bill, in hopes of returning one day to the world of horse racing. Dan is encouraged to follow his dream by his unwed sister-in-law Alice and stable hand Whitey. One night at a family dinner, J. L. reports that sales are down in the paper box division and blames it on Dan's neglect of his work. When he orders Dan to sell the horse and focus on his factory job, Dan resigns and leaves Higginsville without his wife Margaret, who shows little sympathy for her husband.

With Broadway Bill in tow, Dan drives to the Imperial Race Track, where he reunites with former colleagues and enters his horse in the upcoming Imperial Derby. After barely scraping together the meager fifty-dollar entrance fee, Dan convinces Pop Jones to provide feed and shelter on credit, and then searches for a backer who can provide the five hundred dollar nominating fee. At a preliminary race, Broadway Bill bolts from the starting gate and is disqualified. Dan writes to his wife Margaret asking her to bring his pet rooster Skeeter, who has a way of calming the horse down. The rooster is delivered instead by young Alice, who is secretly in love with Dan. Alice decides to stay and help with the horse, despite Dan's objections. He is unaware of her feelings for him.

During a terrible storm, Broadway Bill catches a serious cold after being soaked by rain leaking through the old barn roof. Alice nurses the horse back to health, and then sells her fur coat and jewelry in order to raise the necessary nominating fee—telling Whitey to say he won the money shooting craps. The night before the derby, however, Pop Jones confiscates the horse because he was never paid for the feed and shelter, and when Dan tries to intervene, he is thrown in jail. Not even Dan's "princess" Alice can help him now.

Meanwhile, millionaire J. P. Chase innocently places a $2 bet on Broadway Bill at 100-to-1 odds to impress his pretty nurse. The bet is misinterpreted, and word soon gets out that the "smart" money is on Broadway Bill, making him the favorite. This change pleases bookmaker Eddie Morgan, whose horse will benefit from the changing odds. To continue the betting and prevent Broadway Bill from being scratched, Eddie bails Dan out of jail, pays his bills, and arranges for top jockey Ted Williams to ride Broadway Bill in the derby. A grateful Dan is unaware that Eddie bribed Ted to prevent Broadway Bill from winning. During the race, Ted tries to rein in Broadway Bill, but the heroic horse ignores the jockey's instructions and runs to victory. After crossing the finishing line, Broadway Bill collapses and dies of a burst heart. After the funeral, Dan and Whitey leave town.

Two years later, J.L. announces to his family that since Margaret's divorce he has sold off most of his holdings and intends to sell the bank next. His announcement is interrupted when Dan arrives honking his car horn, demanding that J.L. "release the princess from the dark tower". A joyous Alice runs to join Dan, Whitey, and their two new thoroughbreds, Broadway Bill II and Princess. As they're preparing to drive away, J.L. leaves his family behind and runs after to join them.

== Cast ==
- Warner Baxter as Dan Brooks
- Myrna Loy as Alice Higgins
- Walter Connolly as J. L. Higgins
- Helen Vinson as Margaret
- Douglass Dumbrille as Eddie Morgan
- Raymond Walburn as Colonel Pettigrew
- Lynne Overman as Happy McGuire
- Clarence Muse as Whitey
- Margaret Hamilton as Edna
- Frankie Darro as Ted Williams
- George Cooper as Joe
- George Meeker as Henry Early
- Jason Robards, Sr. as Arthur Winslow
- Ed Tucker as Jimmy Baker
- Edmund Breese as Race Track Judge
- Clara Blandick as Mrs. Peterson
- Lucille Ball as telephone operator (uncredited)

== Themes ==
Broadway Bill presents several common themes found in Capra films. The theme of love, for example, as a bridge across class and social divide is also central to the film It Happened One Night. Like Claudette Colbert's character Ellen Andrews, Myrna Loy's Alice Higgins rebels against the wealth and privilege of her father's world and the constraints they impose on her search of legitimate love. These constraints are comically underscored in the dinner scenes where the entire Higgins family eats in regimented style. During these ritualistic meals that resemble board meetings, Alice is seated opposite an empty chair reserved for her future husband who, like her brothers-in-law, will be required to work for her father. Dan rejects the constraints that box him into J. L.'s lifeless world—literally a world of paper boxes—and decides to follow his love and passion for horse racing.

== Production ==
=== Screenplay ===
The screenplay for Broadway Bill was written by Robert Riskin, based on the unpublished short story "Strictly Confidential" by New York Daily Mirror columnist Mark Hellinger. Riskin had written previous screenplays for Capra for The Miracle Woman (1931), Platinum Blonde (1931), American Madness (1933), Lady for a Day (1933), and It Happened One Night (1934)—receiving an Academy Award for the latter film. As an owner of race horses and a regular at tracks, Riskin was able to effectively capture the atmosphere and dynamics of horse racing and the types of characters common to that environment, such as jockeys, stable hands, and gamblers.

While filming at Tanforan Race Track, Capra became dissatisfied with the happy ending of the original script, wanting instead a more bittersweet and ambivalent ending comment on the American success ethic. With Riskin on vacation in Europe and unavailable, Capra invited former Paramount screenwriter Sidney Buchman to Palo Alto to discuss changes to the end of the film. By the end of the evening, Buchman wrote four pages of new scenes depicting the horse's death after crossing the finish line, the subsequent funeral, and new ending. Buchman, who finished the new scenes only a few hours before the final race scene was filmed, was never credited for his contribution. He later wrote the screenplay for Capra's Mr. Smith Goes to Washington (1939).

=== Casting ===
According to cinematographer Joseph Walker and sound engineer Edward Bernds, Capra wanted Clark Gable for the leading role, but the actor was unavailable. Capra settled for Warner Baxter, whose fear of horses restricted Capra's ability to film close-up scenes with the actor and the horse. Disappointed in the few close-up scenes he managed to film, he vowed to remake the film with an actor who loved horses. He got his opportunity when he cast Bing Crosby in Riding High (1950), his remake of the film. Capra cast Myrna Loy and Helen Vinson as the female leads, and Walter Connolly was cast as J.L. Higgins. A 23-year-old Lucille Ball appeared briefly in one scene as a blonde telephone operator. For the role of stable hand Whitey, Capra chose African-American actor-writer-composer Clarence Muse, a graduate of the Dickinson School of Law in Pennsylvania, who always delivered restrained performances and was one of Capra's favorite supporting players.

=== Filming ===
Broadway Bill was filmed from June 18 to August 16, 1934 at Columbia Studios in Hollywood, and on location at Tanforan Race Track in San Bruno, California, Warner Bros. Ranch, and the Pacific Coast Steel Mills. After an initial preview on October 24, Capra re-edited some scenes based upon audience reaction.

== Release ==
Broadway Bill premiered on November 30, 1934, in New York City, and it was released in the United States on December 27, 1934. Through October 1936 the film had domestic theater rentals of almost $670,000 according to Variety surveys of the time.

== Critical response ==
In his review for The New York Times, Andre Sennwald called the film a "sly and impertinent screen comedy, painlessly whimsical and completely engaging". Seenwald continues:

Broadway Bill unfolds the fresh and inventive talent of Frank Capra in a mood of high good humor. Out of the sentimental simplicities of Mark Hellinger's story, Mr. Capra manufactures the kind of entertainment which pleases the thin-nosed sophisticate as well as the ribbon-counter empress and the affrighted defender of the public morale. So skillfully does he wield his gently satirical cameras that, if you are not aware of the portentous matters he is spoofing, you are still under the impression that the screen is providing an uncommonly pleasant experience. For Mr. Capra owns a rare gift for cinema. It is a fortunate coincidence that he bestows it for the greatest good of the greatest number.

Seenwald goes on to praise the performances of the entire cast, singling out the "enormously agreeable" Warner Baxter and Myrna Loy who "reaffirms our faith in her, both as a light comedienne and as a person". Seenwald concludes by recommending Broadway Bill "without reservations".

In his review for AllMovie, Bruce Eder gave the film four out of five stars, writing that the film was "almost too much movie for its own good", with perhaps too many digressions and characters. Despite these shortcomings, Eder concludes that the director ultimately delivers a good film:

Capra pulls it all together better than probably any director this side of William Wyler could have, and he does it with some surprisingly deft touches in the individual scenes getting a very physical performance out of Warner Baxter, a deeply passionate one from Myrna Loy, and some serious help from Walter Connolly and Clarence Muse. It doesn't quite all fit together, but it is a very ambitious and effective comedy drama with some memorable scenes and moments throughout and a wonderfully upbeat finale with an unexpected twist.

Variety magazine wrote "If any racetrack picture ever had a chance to beat the no-femme-draw bugaboo, Broadway Bill is the picture. It has a story, a tiptop cast—and Frank Capra's direction."

== Home media ==
Broadway Bill was released on DVD on August 31, 2004, by Paramount in 1:33:1 aspect ratio. An introduction by Frank Capra Jr. was included as a special feature. A DVD version was released by Warner Home Video (under license from Paramount) on April 22, 2014.

== See also ==
- List of films about horses
- List of films about horse racing
