= Pocketful of Miracles =

1961 film by Frank Capra

- Theatrical release poster
- Directed by: Frank Capra
- Screenplay by: Hal Kanter; Harry Tugend
- Based on: "Madame la Gimp"; 1929 story in Cosmopolitan by: Damon Runyon Lady for a Day 1933 film; Robert Riskin
- Produced by: Frank Capra
- Starring: Glenn Ford; Bette Davis; Hope Lange; Arthur O'Connell; Peter Falk; Thomas Mitchell; Edward Everett Horton; Mickey Shaughnessy
- Cinematography: Robert J. Bronner
- Edited by: Frank P. Keller
- Music by: Walter Scharf
- Production company: Franton Productions
- Distributed by: United Artists
- Release date: December 19, 1961
- Running time: 137 minutes
- Country: United States
- Language: English
- Budget: $2.9 million
- Box office: $5 million ($53.9 million in 2025 dollars) $2.5 million (US/Canada)

Pocketful of Miracles is a 1961 American comedy film, starring Glenn Ford and Bette Davis, produced and directed by Frank Capra, filmed in Panavision. The screenplay by Hal Kanter and Harry Tugend was based on Robert Riskin's screenplay for the 1933 film Lady for a Day, which was in turn adapted from the 1929 Damon Runyon short story "Madame La Gimp". That original 1933 film was also directed by Capra—one of two films that he originally directed and later remade, the other being Broadway Bill (1934) and its remake Riding High (1950).

The film was the final project for both Capra and Thomas Mitchell. It marked Ann-Margret's film debut.

Peter Falk was nominated for an Academy Award for Best Supporting Actor.

== Plot ==
"Dave the Dude", a very successful New York City gangster, has one superstition: he believes that the apples he buys from alcoholic street peddler Apple Annie bring him luck. Annie assures the Dude that his latest purchase is especially lucky. He then meets Elizabeth "Queenie" Martin, the daughter of a friend and speakeasy owner recently murdered for owing a lot of money to the wrong people. Queenie offers to pay him $5 a week from her cashier's salary toward the $20,000 owed him. Instead, trusting Annie's claim, he decides to make Queenie a nightclub star. To the astonishment of his right-hand man, "Joy Boy", he succeeds, and Queenie is able to pay off all her father's creditors after two years, just as Prohibition ends.

Dave has an important meeting with a very powerful underworld boss from Chicago, Steve Darcey, aka "Mr. Big". Darcey is debating whether to allow Dave to control the New York territory in exchange for $50,000 "as a token of good faith." Dave counters by demanding $100,000 "as a token of your good faith."

Meanwhile, Annie has an illegitimate daughter named Louise, whom she sent to Europe as a baby. In her letters to Louise, she masquerades as wealthy socialite Mrs. E. Worthington Manville, sending Louise money she gets from the Dude and various "godparents" (her fellow beggars and panhandlers). Louise, now grown up, is bringing her Spanish fiancé Carlos and his father, Count Alfonso Romero, to meet her. Annie has been pretending she resides in a luxurious hotel (writing her letters on stolen hotel stationery) and has Louise's letters mailed there intercepted for her by an employee. However, the employee is fired when this is found out.

Dave's girlfriend Queenie insists he help Annie continue her charade. Dave reluctantly goes along, worried that his luck would run out otherwise. Queenie has the bedraggled Annie made up to look like a sophisticated socialite, while Dave borrows an out-of-town friend's luxurious penthouse suite, complete with Hudgins the butler, and arranges for cultured pool hustler "Judge" Henry G. Blake to pose as Annie's husband.

When Dave keeps postponing finalizing the deal with Mr. Big to help Annie, Joy Boy becomes increasingly exasperated and frightened. Dave manages to engineer a lavish reception, with New York's mayor and governor as guests, the night before Louise and her impressed future husband and father-in-law sail back to Europe, none the wiser about her mother's real identity. Mr. Big agrees to the Dude's terms, but the Dude decides to marry Queenie and settle down.

== Cast ==
- Glenn Ford as Dave the Dude
- Bette Davis as Apple Annie
- Hope Lange as Queenie Martin
- Arthur O'Connell as Count Alfonso Romero
- Peter Falk as Joy Boy
- Sheldon Leonard as Steve Darcy/"Mr. Big"
- Thomas Mitchell as Henry G. Blake
- Edward Everett Horton as Hudgins
- Mickey Shaughnessy as Junior
- David Brian as Governor
- Ann-Margret as Louise
- Jerome Cowan as Mayor
- Peter Mann as Carlos Romero
- Ellen Corby as Soho Sal
- Jack Elam as Cheesecake
- Mike Mazurki as Big Mike
- Barton MacLane as Police Commissioner
- John Litel as Police Chief
- Doodles Weaver as Pool Player
- Frank Ferguson as Newspaper Editor
- George E. Stone as Shimkey the Blind Man
- Jay Novello as the Spanish Consul
- Benny Rubin as Flyaway, Dude's lawyer
- Mittie Lawrence as Lola, Apple Annie's maid
- Fritz Feld as Pierre

== Production ==
Frank Capra had directed Lady for a Day in 1933, and for years, he had wanted to film a remake, but executives at Columbia Pictures, which owned the screen rights, felt the original story was too old-fashioned. In the mid-1950s, when Hal Wallis offered to buy it as a Paramount Pictures vehicle for Shirley Booth, Columbia head Harry Cohn decided to offer it to Capra instead, hoping he could lure Booth to his studio. Unable to persuade either Abe Burrows or Garson Kanin to update the plot, Capra began working on the screenplay himself. His modern version, which involved Korean War orphans and an apple farm in Oregon, was filled with Cold War rhetoric and retitled Ride the Pink Cloud. Cohn insisted Capra find a collaborator, but he thought the draft submitted by Harry Tugend was no better, and he dropped the project.

In 1960, Capra bought the screen rights from Columbia for $225,000, and the director made a deal with United Artists, where it was decided to film the story as a period piece set in the 1930s. Capra originally cast Frank Sinatra as Dave the Dude, but the actor walked out due to disagreements about the script. Kirk Douglas, Dean Martin and Jackie Gleason rejected the role. Then Glenn Ford approached Capra with an offer to help finance the film through his production company if he were cast as the lead. The director felt Ford was wrong for the part, but out of desperation, he agreed to the arrangement, which called for each of them to receive 37½ percent of the film's profits. Ford was paid $350,000 upfront, but Capra received only $200,000. Because the film never earned back its cost, he lost an additional $50,000 in deferred salary.

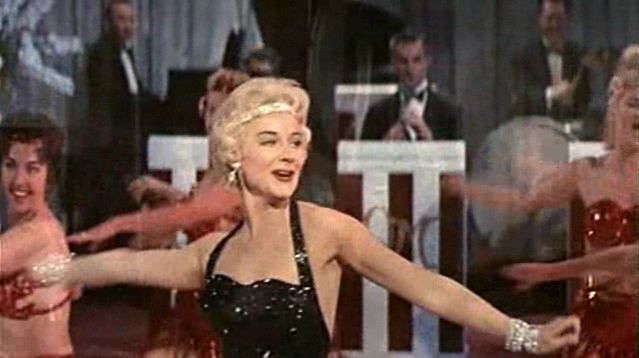
Hope Lange as Queenie Martin

Budgeted at $2.9 million, the film began principal photography on April 20, 1961. Cast as Apple Annie was Bette Davis, who accepted the role after Shirley Booth, Helen Hayes, Katharine Hepburn, and Jean Arthur declined it. Davis was undergoing financial difficulties, and the need for the $100,000 paycheck overshadowed her concern about making her Hollywood comeback (her last American film had been Storm Center in 1956) in the role of an elderly woman. From the beginning, she clashed with co-star Glenn Ford, who had demanded Hope Lange, his girlfriend at the time, be given the dressing room adjacent to his, which Davis had already been assigned. Davis graciously insisted any dressing room she was given would be adequate, noting "Dressing rooms have never been responsible for the success of a film." Despite her effort to avoid an unpleasant situation, Davis was given the room Lange had wanted, and from then on Ford began treating her like a supporting player. In an interview, he suggested he was so grateful to Davis for the support she had given him during the filming of A Stolen Life in 1946, he had insisted she be cast as Apple Annie in order to revive her sagging career, a condescending remark Davis never forgot or forgave.

Because of Ford's involvement with the financing of the film, Capra refused to intervene in any of the disagreements between the two stars, but he suffered blinding and frequently incapacitating headaches as a result of the stress.

Ann-Margret was paid $1,500 per week.

Filming was completed in late June 1961, and Capra painfully struggled to get through the post-production period. Upon its completion, he professed to prefer the remake to the original, although most critics, and in later years film historians and movie buffs, disagreed with his assessment.

== Reception ==
Motion Picture Herald covered the preview and gave the film good marks, with the review headline "Pocketful of Dollars" predicting an excellent box office performance. Boxoffice confirmed that the film "ranked in the top hit class by exhibitors in the 20 key cities across the nation." The critic for The Hollywood Reporter also looked upon the film favorably, calling it "a Christmas sockful of joy, funny, sentimental, romantic [and] frankly capricious."

Other reviewers were more guarded. In The New York Times, A.H. Weiler noted: "Mr. Capra and his energetic troupe manage to get a fair share of laughs from Mr. Runyon's oddball guys and dolls, but their lampoon is dated and sometimes uneven and listless...Repetition and a world faced by grimmer problems seem to have been excessively tough competition for this plot." Variety thought the plot "alternates uneasily between wit and sentiment" and added "The picture seems too long, considering that there's never any doubt as to the outcome, and it's also too lethargic, but there are sporadic compensations of line and situation that reward the patience. Fortunately Capra has assembled some of Hollywood's outstanding character players for the chore...The best lines in the picture go to Peter Falk...[who] just about walks off with the film when he's on." Veteran publisher Pete Harrison classed the film as only "fair," citing the Bette Davis approach to the May Robson portrayal: "The old Robson touch of wistful poignancy to the role is missing. Miss Davis' sharp, clipped, almost cold delivery gives you the feeling that any minute she'll be calling out to 'Petah.' She fails to beget your sympathy. For all the individual brilliance shown by [the supporting players], this doesn't quite reach its big picture objective. To be sure, it doesn't fail by much." Least impressed was Elaine Rothschild of Films in Review: "This unbelievable and unfunny comedy proves only that director Frank Capra has learned nothing and forgotten nothing in the 28 years that intervened between the two pictures. Pocketful of Miracles is not merely out of whole cloth, but out of date, and watching it is a painful experience." Filmink argued Ann Margret "is sweet in a small but important part, one of the best things about the movie; she certainly made more of an impact than the bloke who plays her fiancee, another 'discovery' Peter Mann."

Exhibitors protested Bette Davis's star billing as they worried it would hurt the box office, and the receipts did fall short of expectations.

== Awards and nominations ==
Award	Category	Nominee(s)	Result
Academy Awards	Best Supporting Actor	Peter Falk	Nominated
Academy Awards	Best Costume Design – Color	Edith Head and Walter Plunkett	Nominated
Academy Awards	Best Song	"Pocketful of Miracles"; Music by Jimmy Van Heusen; Lyrics by Sammy Cahn	Nominated
American Cinema Editors Awards	Best Edited Feature Film	Frank P. Keller	Nominated
Directors Guild of America Awards	Outstanding Directorial Achievement in Motion Pictures	Frank Capra	Nominated
Golden Globe Awards	Best Motion Picture – Comedy		Nominated
Golden Globe Awards	Best Actor in a Motion Picture – Musical or Comedy	Glenn Ford	Won
Golden Globe Awards	Best Actress in a Motion Picture – Musical or Comedy	Bette Davis	Nominated
Golden Globe Awards	Most Promising Newcomer – Female	Ann-Margret	Won
Laurel Awards	Top Song	"Pocketful of Miracles"; Music by Jimmy Van Heusen; Lyrics by Sammy Cahn	Nominated

== Home media ==
MGM Home Entertainment released the film on VHS in 1997 followed by the Region 1 DVD on September 18, 2001. It is in non-anamorphic widescreen format with audio tracks in English and Spanish and subtitles in Spanish and French. It received a US Region A Blu-ray release on November 18, 2014 from Kino Lorber.

== Remakes ==
The film was remade in Persian as Gedayan Tehran (1967), Turkish as Elmacı Kadın (1971). Pocketful of Miracles is the basis for the 1989 Hong Kong film Miracles starring Jackie Chan and Anita Mui, which later was remade as the 2008 Hindi-language Indian film Singh Is Kinng, starring Akshay Kumar and Katrina Kaif.

== See also ==
- List of American films of 1961
- List of films featuring the deaf and hard of hearing
