= Victoria Riskin =

American screenwriter (born 1945)

- Born: November 18, 1945 (age 79); Los Angeles, California, U.S.
- Spouse: David W. Rintels (m. 1979)
- Parents: Robert Riskin (father); Fay Wray (mother)

Victoria Riskin (born November 18, 1945) is an American author, psychologist, television writer and producer, and human rights activist. She is the founder of Bluedot Living, a media company with print and digital magazines publishing stories about solution-based approaches to climate change and sustainability.

== Early life ==
Riskin was born in the Bel-Air neighborhood of Los Angeles, the daughter of Academy Award-winning screenwriter Robert Riskin, whose films include It Happened One Night (1934), Mr. Deeds Goes to Town (1936), and Lost Horizon (1937), and actress Fay Wray, famous for her role as Ann Darrow in King Kong (1933). Riskin is the author of a memoir and dual biography, Fay Wray and Robert Riskin: A Hollywood Memoir, released by Pantheon in February 2019 and nominated “Best Biography” for the Los Angeles Times Book Prize that same year.

Raised on the west side of Los Angeles, Riskin attended public schools, Stephens College in Missouri, The Institute for American Universities in Aix-en-Provence, France, and graduated from the University of Southern California (USC) with a BA in the Humanities. She received an MA from Antioch University and Ph.D. from USC, both degrees in psychology.

== Career ==
During her early career, she established a private practice as a psychotherapist and also specialized in forensic psychology. In 1990, she produced a movie-for-television with her husband, multi-Emmy award-winning writer-producer David W. Rintels. The Last Best Year was based on her personal experience with a patient dying of cancer and starred Mary Tyler Moore playing Riskin and Bernadette Peters as the patient. John O'Connor, television reviewer for The New York Times said, "What takes place here is that rare occurrence in films of any sort – a female bonding … Ms. Moore and Ms. Peters give marvelously restrained and touching performances."

After The Last Best Year, Riskin transitioned to full-time writing and producing in 1992, working primarily with her husband on made-for-television films, and writing for NBC, CBS and USA networks. Her producing credits include: A Town Torn Apart (1992), starring Michael Tucker and Jill Eikenberry, about an innovative high school principal; World War II: When Lions Roared (1994), about the relationship between Roosevelt, Churchill and Stalin, starring John Lithgow, Bob Hoskins and Michael Caine; My Antonia (1995), from Willa Cather's classic novel, which Riskin both wrote and produced, with Jason Robards and Eva Marie Saint; The Member of the Wedding (1997) based on Carson McCullers' novel, with Anna Paquin and Alfre Woodard.

From 2009 to 2016, Riskin chaired the Board of Trustees of Antioch University Santa Barbara, expanding the campus' footprint and visibility in the community. She also played a seminal role in bringing NPR station KCRW to the Central Coast, and served on the Board of Directors of KCRW.

In Spring 2021, Riskin launched a print and digital magazine on Martha's Vineyard, highlighting climate issues and local approaches to environmental care. Bluedot Living's digital newsletters and websites have since expanded to seven other locations: Brooklyn, Toronto, Boston, Nantucket, San Diego, Los Angeles and Santa Barbara, with a self-reported circulation of more than 250,000. Bluedot Living has won multiple top awards from the New England News and Press Association.

=== Civic engagement and activism ===
Riskin has been dedicated to non-profit work and activism on behalf of human rights, education, her union (Writers Guild of America, West), and public radio. She served on the Board of Directors of Human Rights Watch (HRW) for twelve years, traveled widely with the organization, and was a founding member of Human Rights Watch in Southern California, helping to build chapters in Los Angeles and Santa Barbara. For eight years, she chaired the Hellman-Hammett Prize Committee, established by the estate of Lillian Hellman and administered by HRW, a fund for writers around the world who were victims of political persecution.

In 2001, Riskin was the first woman in 50 years elected President of the Writers Guild of America, West – Mary C McCall Jr had been WGA president 1942-44 and 1951–52. She was dedicated to eliminating the "Film By," credit given to directors implying their sole authorship of films. She argued before the FCC in Washington against media consolidation and in Hollywood on behalf of improved representation and creative rights for animation writers. She also served as a Trustee and Chair of the Writers and Producers Pension and Health Fund. She was reelected President of the union by a significant margin in 2003 but stepped down early in 2004 over a controversy about Guild rules on eligibility to run for office.

== Personal life ==
Riskin is married to television, film, and stage writer and producer, David W. Rintels. They live on Martha's Vineyard. Riskin's older brother, Robert Jr. retired as the owner of the legendary McCabe's Guitar Shop in Santa Monica in 2020.

== Awards ==
- The Last Best Year – The Christopher Award (1991)^{†}; The American Psychological Association Award for Excellence in Television.
- A Town Torn Apart – The Christopher Award (1992)
- My Antonia – New York Festivals – Outstanding achievement in Made-for-Television; World Media Awards Silver Medal – Screenwriting; The Christopher Award (1995)
- World War II: When Lions Roared – The Producer Guild of America Norman Felton Television Producer of the Year Award, for the "Best Single Program."
- Fay Wray and Robert Riskin: A Hollywood Memoir – nominated "Best Biography" Los Angeles Times Book Prize 2019

^{†}The Christopher Awards were created in 1949 to celebrate writers, producers, directors, authors, and illustrators whose work "affirms the highest values of the human spirit."

=== Honors ===
- Chairman's Award by The Caucus for Producers, Writers & Directors for her leadership role in the Creative Community's fight against media concentration, 2002.
- Justice Rose Bird Person of Courage Award by Death Penalty Focus, 2006.
- The Horace Mann Alumna of the Year Award by Antioch University Los Angeles.
- The Human Rights-Defender of the First Amendment Award by the ACLU of Southern California.
- The Writers Guild of America West in 2009 Valentine Davies Award in recognition of contributions to the entertainment industry and community at large, "which have brought dignity and honor to writers everywhere."
- California State Assemblyman Das Williams honored her as Santa Barbara California Woman of the Year in 2012.
- State Senator Hannah-Beth Jackson, honored her as a Woman of the Year in 2014.
