= Donald Meek =

British actor (1878–1946)

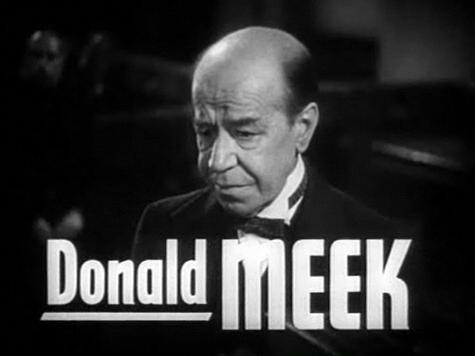
- Trailer for A Woman's Face (1941)
- Born: Thomas Donald Meek; 14 July 1878; Glasgow, Scotland
- Died: 18 November 1946 (aged 68); Los Angeles, California, US
- Occupation: Actor
- Years active: 1886–1946
- Spouse: Belle Walken (m. 1909)
- Children: 1

Thomas Donald Meek (14 July 1878 – 18 November 1946) was a Scottish-American actor. He first performed publicly at the age of eight and began appearing on Broadway in 1903.

Meek appeared in the films You Can't Take It with You (1938) and Stagecoach (1939). He posthumously received a star on the Hollywood Walk of Fame in 1960.

== Early years ==
Meek was born in Glasgow to Matthew and Annie Meek. In the 1890s, the Meek family emigrated to Canada and then to the United States. By 1900, they were living in Philadelphia, where Meek was employed as a dry goods salesman, according to the United States census of that year.

== Career ==
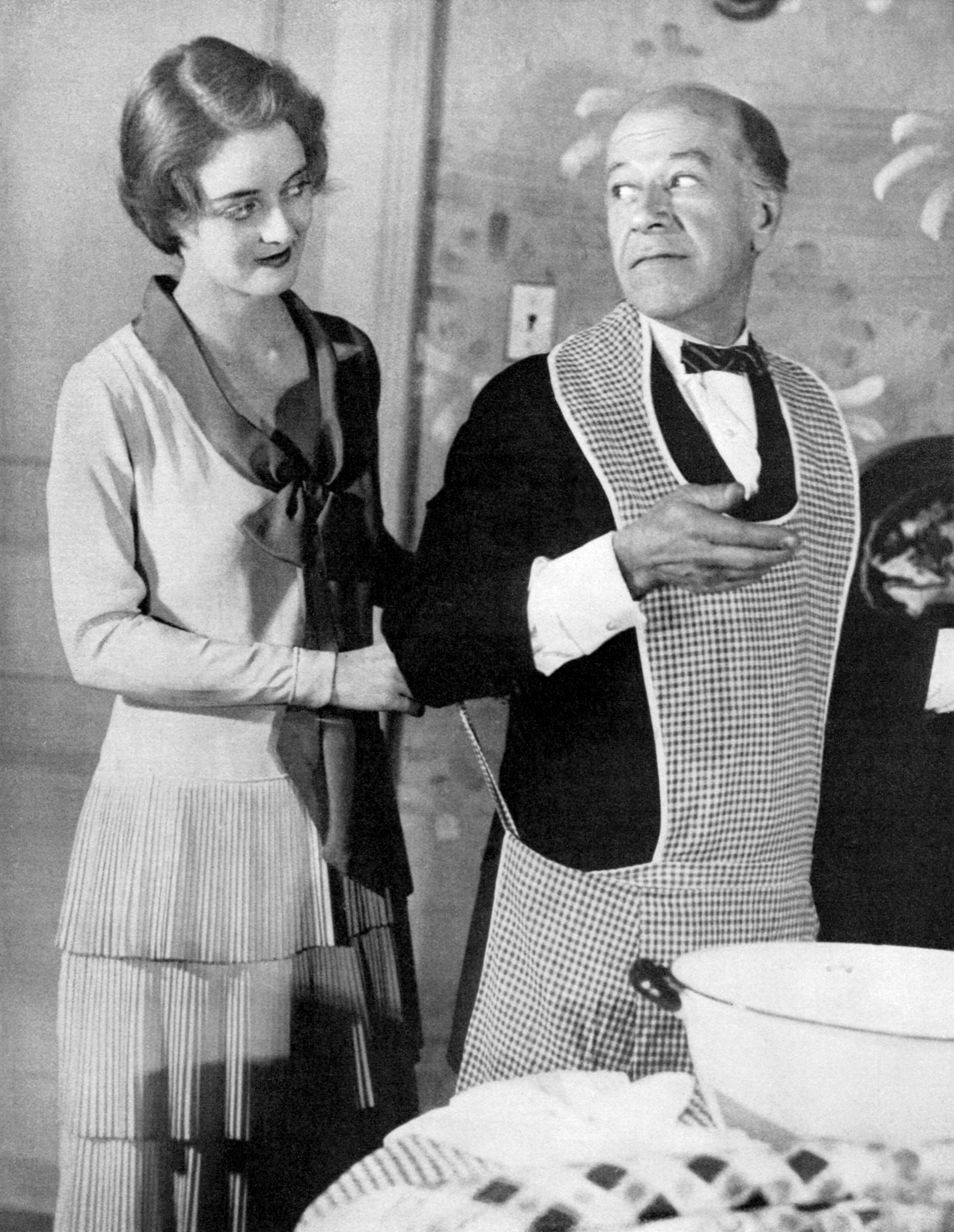
Bette Davis and Donald Meek in the Broadway production Broken Dishes (1929)

Meek's Broadway credits include The Minister's Daughters (1903), Going Up (1917), Nothing But Love (1919), The Hottentot (1920), Little Old New York (1920), Six-Cylinder Love (1921), Tweedles (1923), The Potters (1923), Easy Terms (1925), Fool's Bells (1925), Love 'em and Leave 'em (1926), The Shelf (1926), Spread Eagle (1927), My Princess (1927), The Ivory Door (1927), Mr. Moneypenny (1928), and Jonesy (1929). In Broken Dishes (1929), he starred with a young Bette Davis.

After years on the stage, Meek became a film actor. His movies include The Adventures of Tom Sawyer, Little Miss Broadway, and State Fair.

Meek, who had lost his hair due to yellow fever, was cast as timid, worried characters in many of his films. Notable roles include Mr. Poppins in Frank Capra's You Can't Take It With You and whiskey salesman Samuel Peacock in John Ford's Stagecoach.

From 1931 through 1932, Meek was featured as criminologist Dr. Crabtree in a series of 12 Warner Bros. two-reel short subjects written by S.S. Van Dine.

== Personal life ==
Meek and Isabella "Belle" Walken married in Boston in a Methodist church on 3 January 1909. By this marriage, the American-born Belle Meek lost her United States citizenship by taking her husband's British nationality.

== Death ==
Donald Meek died of leukaemia on 18 November 1946, in Los Angeles, while filming the role of Mr. Twiddle in Magic Town. A prolific film actor in over 100 Hollywood movies during its Golden Age, he received a posthumous star on the Hollywood Walk of Fame.

== Selected filmography ==
Year	Title	Role	Notes
1923	Six Cylinder Love	Richard Burton	
1929	The Hole in the Wall	Goofy	
1930	The Love Kiss	William	
1931	The Girl Habit	Jonesy	
1931	Personal Maid	Pa Ryan	
1932	Wayward	Hotel Clerk	Uncredited
1933	Love, Honor, and Oh Baby!	Luther Bowen	
1933	Ever in My Heart	Storekeeper	Scenes deleted
1933	College Coach	Prof. Spencer Trask	
1934	Hi Nellie!	Durkin	
1934	Bedside	Dr. George Wiley	
1934	The Last Gentleman	Judd Barr	
1934	Murder at the Vanities	Dr. Saunders	
1934	The Defense Rests	Fogg	
1934	The Merry Widow	Valet	
1934	Mrs. Wiggs of the Cabbage Patch	Mr. Wiggs	
1934	What Every Woman Knows	Snibby	Uncredited
1934	The Captain Hates the Sea	Josephus Bushmills	
1934	It's a Gift	Uncle Bean in Photograph	Uncredited
1934	The Mighty Barnum		Scene deleted
1935	Biography of a Bachelor Girl	Mr. Irish	
1935	Romance in Manhattan	Minister	
1935	The Gilded Lily	Hankerson	
1935	Society Doctor	Moxley	
1935	The Whole Town's Talking	Hoyt	
1935	Baby Face Harrington	Skinner	
1935	Mark of the Vampire	Dr. Doskil	
1935	The Informer	Peter Mulligan	
1935	Village Tale	Charlie	
1935	Old Man Rhythm	Paul Parker	
1935	China Seas	Passenger Playing Chess	Uncredited
1935	Accent on Youth	Orville	Uncredited
1935	Happiness C.O.D.	Thomas Sherridan	
1935	The Return of Peter Grimm	Mayor Everett Bartholomew	
1935	She Couldn't Take It	Uncle Wyndersham	
1935	Barbary Coast	Sawbuck McTavish	
1935	Peter Ibbetson	Mr. Slade	
1935	Kind Lady	Mr. Foster	
1935	Captain Blood	Dr. Whacker	
1935	The Bride Comes Home	The Judge	
1936	Everybody's Old Man	Finney	
1936	And So They Were Married	Hotel Manager	
1936	One Rainy Afternoon	Judge	
1936	Three Wise Guys	Gribbie	
1936	Three Married Men	Mr. Frisbee	
1936	Old Hutch	Mr. Gunnison	
1936	Two in a Crowd	Bennett	
1936	Love on the Run	Caretaker	
1936	Pennies from Heaven	Gramp Smith	
1937	Maid of Salem	Ezra Cheeves	
1937	Behind the Headlines	Potter	
1937	Parnell	Murphy	
1937	Three Legionnaires	Uriah S. Grant	
1937	The Toast of New York	Daniel Drew	
1937	Artists and Models	Dr. Zimmer	
1937	Make a Wish	Joseph	
1937	Double Wedding	Judge Blynn	Uncredited
1937	Breakfast for Two	Justice of the Peace	
1937	You're a Sweetheart	Conway Jeeters	
1938	Double Danger	Gordon Ainsley aka Henry Robinson	
1938	The Adventures of Tom Sawyer	Sunday School Superintendent	
1938	Goodbye Broadway	Iradius P. Oglethorpe	
1938	Having Wonderful Time	P.U. Rogers	
1938	Little Miss Broadway	Willoughby Wendling	
1938	You Can't Take It with You	Poppins	
1938	Hold That Co-ed	Dean Fletcher	
1939	Jesse James	McCoy	
1939	Stagecoach	Samuel Peacock	
1939	Young Mr. Lincoln	Prosecutor John Felder	
1939	Blondie Takes a Vacation	Jonathan N. Gillis	
1939	Hollywood Cavalcade	Lyle P. Stout	
1939	The Housekeeper's Daughter	Editor Wilson	
1939	Nick Carter, Master Detective	Bartholomew	
1940	Oh, Johnny, How You Can Love	Adelbert Thistlebottom	
1940	Dr. Ehrlich's Magic Bullet	Mittelmeyer	
1940	My Little Chickadee	Amos Budge	
1940	The Man from Dakota	Mr. Vestry	
1940	The Ghost Comes Home	Mortimer Hopkins, Sr.	
1940	Star Dust	Sam Wellman	
1940	Turnabout	Henry	
1940	Phantom Raiders	Bartholomew	
1940	The Return of Frank James	McCoy	
1940	Sky Murder	Bartholomew	
1940	Third Finger, Left Hand	Mr. Flandrin	
1940	Hullabaloo	Mr. Clyde Perkins	
1941	Design for Scandal		
1941	The Wild Man of Borneo	Professor Birdo	
1941	Come Live with Me	Joe Darsie	
1941	Blonde Inspiration	'Dusty' King	
1941	Free and Easy	Tout	Uncredited
1941	Barnacle Bill	'Pop' Cavendish	
1941	A Woman's Face	Herman Rundvik	
1941	The Feminine Touch	Captain Makepeace Liveright	
1941	Rise and Shine	Professor Philip Murray	
1941	Babes on Broadway	Mr. Stone	
1942	Tortilla Flat	Paul D. Cummings	
1942	Maisie Gets Her Man	Mr. Stickwell	
1942	The Omaha Trail	Engineer Jonah McCleod	
1942	Seven Sweethearts	Reverend Howgan	
1943	Keeper of the Flame	Mr. Arbuthnot	
1943	They Got Me Covered	Little Old Man	
1943	Air Raid Wardens	Eustance Middling	
1943	Du Barry Was a Lady	Mr. Jones / Duc de Choiseul	
1943	Lost Angel	Professor Catty	
1944	Rationing	Wilfred Ball	
1944	Two Girls and a Sailor	Mr. Nizby	
1944	Bathing Beauty	Chester Klazenfrantz	
1944	Maisie Goes to Reno	Parsons	
1944	Barbary Coast Gent	Bradford Bellamy I	
1945	The Thin Man Goes Home	Willie Crump	
1945	State Fair	Hippenstahl	
1946	Because of Him	Martin	
1946	Colonel Effingham's Raid	Doc Buden	
1946	Janie Gets Married	Harley P. Stowers	
1946	Affairs of Geraldine	Casper Millhouse	
1947	The Fabulous Joe	Henry Cadwallader	Posthumous release
1947	Magic Town	Mr. Twiddle	Posthumous release
