= Bachelor Party Vegas =

- DVD poster
- Directed by: Eric Bernt
- Written by: Eric Bernt
- Produced by: Trent Othick
- Starring: Kal Penn; Donald Faison; Jonathan Bennett; Diora Baird; Vincent Pastore; Chuck Liddell; Kathy Griffin
- Cinematography: Robert Primes
- Edited by: David Finfer
- Music by: Skeem
- Production company: Insomnia Entertainment
- Distributed by: Sony Pictures Home Entertainment
- Release date: April 25, 2006
- Running time: 91 minutes
- Country: United States
- Language: English

Bachelor Party Vegas is a 2006 American direct-to-video comedy film written and directed by Eric Bernt in his directorial debut. It stars Kal Penn, Jonathan Bennett, Charlie Spiller, Diora Baird and Donald Faison. It was released by Sony Pictures Home Entertainment in the United States on April 25, 2006. In Australia and the UK, it was released under the title Vegas Baby.

== Plot ==
Z-Bob, Ash, Eli and Johnny are a group of four guys who take their soon-to-be married best friend Nathan on a memorable trip to Las Vegas. In order to properly bid farewell to their best friend's life as a single man, they must send him out in style with an extravagant bachelor party in Sin City.

Limousines, paint ball, strippers, sex toys, alcohol, debauchery and gambling are on the agenda until they discover that Mr. Kidd, their bachelor party planner, is a bank robber planning to heist the casino, setting off a chain of events that turns their night into a living hell. Running away from the police, the casino security, and murderous Hell's Angels, the five friends are falsely accused of robbing a casino, stalked by a porn star's prize-fighter boyfriend, mugged by a female Elvis impersonator, arrested, thrown in jail, and survive many other misadventures, until finally, it seems that their own deaths are in the cards.

== Cast ==
- Kal Penn as "Z-Bob"
- Jonathan Bennett as Nathan
- Donald Faison as Ash
- Charlie Talbert as Johnny C. MacElroy
- Aaron Himelstein as Eli
- Vincent Pastore as Carmine / Mr. Kidd
- Chuck Liddell as himself
- Marisa Petroro as The Showgirl
- Lin Shaye as Cassandra
- Graham Beckel as Officer Stone
- Diane Klimaszewski as Chrissy
- Elaine Klimaszewski as Missy
- Brent Briscoe as Mel "Big Gut Mel"
- Jaime Pressly as herself
- Daniel Stern as Harry Hard
- Diora Baird as Penelope
- Lindsay Hollister as Bachelorette
- Lester "Rasta" Speight as "Gold Tooth"
- Steve Hytner as Airport Security
- Andrew Bryniarski as Security Beast
- David Z. Chesnoff as UFC Biker #1
- Mayor Oscar Goodman as himself
- Tamara Whelan as Candy Juggs
- Sophia Rossi as Porn Star
- Kathy Griffin as She-Elvis (uncredited cameo)
