= The Echo (2008 film) =

2008 American supernatural horror film

- Theatrical release poster
- Directed by: Yam Laranas
- Written by: Eric Bernt; Shintaro Shimosawa
- Based on: Sigaw by Yam Laranas
- Produced by: Tyler Mitchell; Will Wright; Shintaro Shimosawa; Roy Lee; Doug Davison
- Starring: Jesse Bradford; Amelia Warner; Kevin Durand; Pruitt Taylor Vince
- Cinematography: Matthew Irving
- Edited by: John Coniglio
- Music by: Tomandandy
- Production companies: QED International; Vertigo Entertainment
- Distributed by: Image Entertainment
- Release dates: July 17, 2008 (Fantasia); November 10, 2009 (United States)
- Running time: 96 minutes
- Country: United States
- Languages: English; Italian
- Budget: $5 million
- Box office: $1.5 million

The Echo is a 2008 American supernatural horror film directed by Yam Laranas and written by Eric Bernt and Shintaro Shimosawa. It is a remake of the 2004 Filipino film Sigaw, also directed by Laranas. The film stars Jesse Bradford and Amelia Warner, with Iza Calzado reprising her role from the original.

The film was first released at the Fantasia Film Festival on July 17, 2008, in Canada. The film ultimately failed to get a theatrical release in the United States and was released straight-to-video on November 10, 2009, on DVD and Blu-ray formats. The theatrical release occurred internationally.

== Plot ==
After serving prison time for manslaughter, Bobby Reynolds is released on probation from Rikers, and moves to the old apartment in East Village, New York, where his lonely mother lived and died while he was incarcerated. He finds a job as a mechanic at the Houston Auto Repair shop owned by the supportive Hector Rodriguez and tries to rebuild his life.

However, he is deemed an outcast and his former friends and neighbors do not want to talk to him. He meets his former girlfriend, Alyssa, who works as waitress and studies in a design school, and they tentatively resume their relationship. Bobby begins hearing strange noises and finds blood on a pillow on his mother's bed in his apartment. He finds a strange hole in the wall behind the apartment's piano; when he pokes his finger in, something draws blood. He hears strange scraping noises that appear to emanate from the floor, and finds blood on the keys of the piano and (inside the piano) some bloody fingernails wrapped in a cloth. He overhears an argument between Walter, an abusive police officer, his wife Gina, and their daughter Carly next door in Room 517. He finds bottles of pills in the bathroom and learns from the manager that his mother had locked herself in her apartment for a week prior to her death.

When Bobby next hears an argument ensue in Room 517, he bangs on the door and tries to intervene. Walter comes to his door and tells him to mind his own business. On another evening, Bobby overhears Walter beating Gina next door, and sees Carly standing in front of his door. He invites her in and calls the police on the tenants next door. However, it turns out that Room 517 has been empty for several years. Bobby continues to hear things; his experiences affect his job performance, and his relationship with Alyssa starts to deteriorate, with her thinking he is crazy.

Meanwhile, Joseph, another tenant who had been experiencing the same visions as Bobby, comes face-to-face with the ghosts in his apartment. His body is later discovered, with the police looking at Bobby as a possible suspect. The ghosts of Gina and Carly begin haunting other individuals who have connections with Bobby and the apartment building: Alyssa, as she is taking her design final; Hector, when he comes to Bobby's apartment in order to apologize for a misunderstanding. While interrogating other tenants, Bobby discovers that, years ago, Walter had beaten his wife to death when she tried to leave him, and dumped his daughter's body down the garbage chute. But although Gina had banged on other people's doors and screamed for help, no one had been willing to intervene (including Bobby's mother, who had then experienced the haunting), and the ghosts of the family continued to haunt the apartment.

Hector, while looking for Bobby, dies by falling down a staircase after running from Carly's ghost. Alyssa, also haunted by the ghosts, runs to Bobby's apartment looking for him, but winds up being dragged to Room 517 by the ghost of Walter, mimicking the way Gina was murdered. Bobby hears Alyssa's screams of pain, and saves her. While tending to her back in his room, Bobby witnesses the scene as it had occurred those years ago; yet, this time, Bobby doesn't let the entire scene play out and rushes to intervene just as Walter is about to give the final blow to Gina. Gina then beats Walter with his nightstick. Gina looks back at him with appreciation, then disappears along with her daughter. With the ghosts gone, Bobby comforts Alyssa as the police head towards the apartment.

== Cast ==
- Jesse Bradford – Bobby Reynolds
- Amelia Warner – Alyssa
- Carlos Leon – Hector Rodriguez
- Iza Calzado – Gina
- Kevin Durand – Walter
- Louise Linton – Katie
- Jamie Bloch – Carly
- Pruitt Taylor Vince – Joseph
- Aron Tager – Old Man
- Hrant Alianak – Max
- Jayne Eastwood – Lucille Jiminez
- Arnold Pinnock – Officer Cole
- Martin Hinz – Detective
- George Santino – Manager
- Paulette Sinclair – Helen Davis
- Bathsheba Garnett – Old Russian Woman
- Stacey LaBerge – Student

== Release ==
The film’s first big screen release occurred on July 17, 2008 in Canada at the Fantasia Film Festival, to mixed reviews with the chief complaints being that it was yet another by-the-numbers Asian horror remake, which were seeing a decline after the disastrous failure of One Missed Call (2008).

The film failed to be picked up by a major US distributor due to the declining interest in Asian horror remakes, which were seen as over-saturating the market, and was instead given a straight-to-video release.

=== Box office ===
The film did receive a theatrical release overseas, and grossed a total of $1.5 million at the end of its theatrical run.

=== Home media ===
The film was released on DVD and Blu-ray on November 10, 2009, by Image Entertainment after failing to secure a theatrical release. The only supplements available are a theatrical trailer.

== Reception ==
The film received mixed to negative reviews, with common criticisms being the use of jump scares and being inferior to the original. Craig McGee, writing for HorrorNews.Net in a generally positive review, writes: "While it didn’t knock my socks off, it was still a very enjoyable, spooky slow burn buildup of a movie that put an ending twist on the ghost story that I wasn’t expecting and hadn’t seen for awhile. It’s available now at fine retailers everywhere, and is well worth checking out…and you can bet your ass I’m going to track down the original version now too!"

Reviewer Leah Saylor-Abney gave a positive review, awarding the film 4 out of 5 stars, saying: "The biggest thing I’d like to pass along to you, dear reader, is being thoroughly shocked by how much I enjoyed what boils down to an uncomplicated ghost story. I’ve watched a lot of horror movies, hundreds with all sorts of bells and whistles, so the simplistic nature of The Echo was…refreshing. I highly suggest this movie to anyone who likes supernatural thrillers or mild horror with strong supernatural elements."

== See also ==
- List of ghost films
- Sigaw (2004), the original film that this film remakes.
