= Robert Riskin =

American screenwriter (1897–1955)

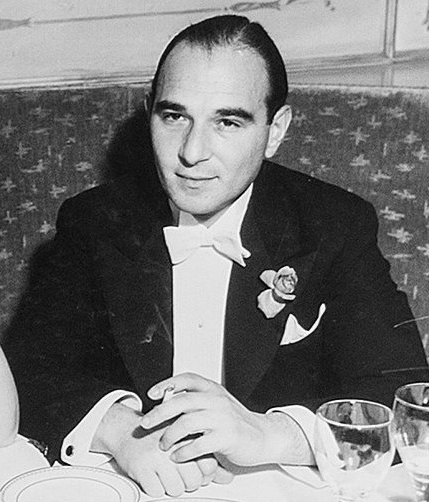
- Riskin at the 1934 Academy Awards
- Born: March 30, 1897; New York City, U.S.
- Died: September 20, 1955 (aged 58); Los Angeles, California, U.S.
- Occupations: Screenwriter; playwright
- Spouse: Fay Wray (m. 1942)
- Children: 3, including Victoria

Robert Riskin (March 30, 1897 – September 20, 1955) was an American screenwriter. He is best known for his collaborations with Frank Capra.

== Early life ==
Robert Riskin was born on New York City's Lower East side to Jewish parents, Bessie and Jakob, who had emigrated from Tsarist Russia to escape conscription. He and his two brothers and two sisters grew up speaking Yiddish. An enthusiast of the vaudeville stage, the teen-age Riskin took every opportunity to sneak into the theatre and catch the shows. He was a particular fan of the comedians who performed there, and he habitually transcribed their jokes into a notebook he carried with him. While still a teen-ager, Riskin took a job with a shirt-manufacturing firm, Heidenheim and Levy. The partners of this firm had a sideline business, investing in the new film industry. They sent the seventeen-year-old Riskin to Florida to run a production company for them. Riskin turned out one- and two-reel films until his enlistment in the Army during World War I.

== Career ==
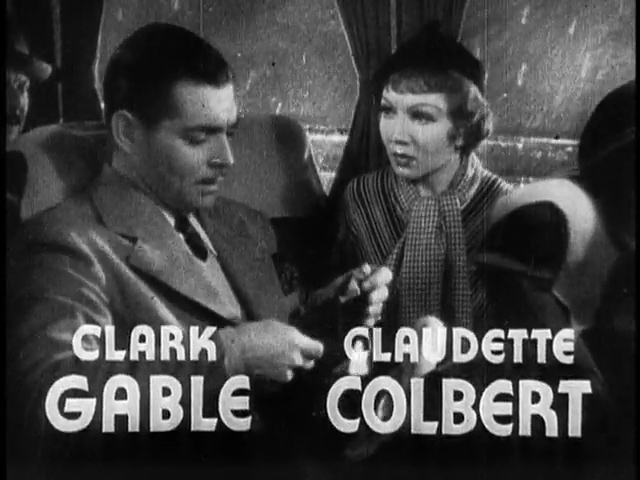
It Happened One Night (1934)

At the end of the war, Riskin returned to New York City, where, in partnership with a friend, he found some success in producing plays for Broadway. Riskin began his career as a playwright, writing for many local New York City playhouses. Two of his plays, Bless You, Sister and Many a Slip, had successful runs. Riskin continued his Broadway career until the 1929 stock market crash and the Great Depression caused many theatres to close.

Motion pictures had just adopted sound, and writers were needed who could write dialogue and were experienced with stage work. Riskin recognized he had the credentials and seized the opportunity by relocating to Hollywood. He moved to Hollywood in 1931 after Columbia Pictures bought the screen rights to several of his plays. His first collaboration with director Frank Capra was the Barbara Stanwyck vehicle The Miracle Woman (1931).

Riskin wrote several films for Columbia, but it was his string of hits with Capra that brought him acclaim. Riskin received Academy Award nominations for his screenplays and stories for five Capra films: Lady for a Day (1933), which Riskin had adapted from a Damon Runyon short story; It Happened One Night (1934), for which he won the Oscar; Mr. Deeds Goes to Town (1936) with Gary Cooper and Jean Arthur; You Can't Take It with You (1938) with Lionel Barrymore and James Stewart; and Here Comes the Groom (1951) with Bing Crosby and Jane Wyman.

Riskin joined Capra in an independent production company in 1939, but they fell out in 1941.

Riskin then became an associate producer for Samuel Goldwyn. When the U.S. entered World War II, he joined the Office of War Information in 1942, where he organized the OWI's overseas division.

Riskin returned to Hollywood in 1945, with the screenplay for The Thin Man Goes Home He had an uncredited collaboration on the 1946 film noir classic The Strange Love of Martha Ivers.

Riskin and his brother Everett formed their own film company. Their first film, the minor James Stewart hit Magic Town (1947), was written and produced by Riskin, who also directed initially. The directing was finished by William A. Wellman. Magic Town has a similar flavor and tone to Riskin's Capra-directed films.

In 1950, Riskin suffered a debilitating stroke which left him unable to write. Riskin had completed the screenplay for Half Angel (1951) and the story for Here Comes the Groom (1951) before the stroke. Ironically, Capra was assigned to direct Here Comes the Groom, and Riskin received a fifth Academy Award nomination for it.

He was an invalid until he died on September 20, 1955.

Riskin directed only one entire film, When You're in Love (1937), a minor musical starring Grace Moore and Cary Grant. At the box office, When You're in Love is now remembered (if at all) for an unusual publicity stunt: silent film-star Louise Brooks was given a chance at a comeback by appearing as a chorus girl in this movie.

=== Relationship with Frank Capra ===
From 1931 to 1938, Riskin and Capra collaborated on eight films as screenwriter and director. Riskin contributed to at least six other screenplays directed by Capra. These films were nominated for 29 Academy Awards, including eight nominations for Riskin and Capra, and won ten, including three for Capra and one for Riskin.

During this period, Riskin and Capra had what appeared to be a harmonious working relationship. Their personal relationship, however, was strained. Riskin was politically liberal, while Capra was a committed, conservative Republican. The protagonists of the Capra-Riskin films were described as "Capra’s Heroes", when in fact they were more a product of Riskin's ideology and social conscience.

In 1939, looking for creative autonomy unavailable in the studio system, Riskin and Capra formed an independent production company, Frank Capra Productions. The partnership was divided 65% for Capra, 35% for Riskin. In 1941, Capra directed Riskin's Meet John Doe.

However, Riskin felt that Capra was taking all the credit for their films, including Riskin's share. Riskin came to resent Capra for this. This led to several confrontations with Capra during the production of Meet John Doe. According to an account by Hollywood screenwriter David Rintels (which was denied by Capra), Riskin brandished 120 blank pages in Capra's face and challenged: "Put the famous Capra touch on that!"

After completion of just one film, Meet John Doe, the association was dissolved. Riskin never willingly collaborated with Capra again.

During the time of his declining health, home confinement, and final residence at the Motion Picture & Television Country Home and Hospital, Riskin was regularly visited by old friends such as Edward G. Robinson, Jack Benny, and Irving Berlin. Long time friend and screenwriting colleague Jo Swerling and his wife remained devoted visitors. Conspicuously absent was Frank Capra, who never visited Riskin during the five years of his illness. Swerling was pained by Capra's behavior, but Riskin refused to disparage Capra. He remained loyal to the man, calling him "his best friend". The Los Angeles Examiner covered Riskin's funeral in September 1955, describing the "notables" in attendance. The report also identified the "one man who wasn’t there": Frank Capra.

In 1961, Capra directed A Pocketful of Miracles, a remake of Capra and Riskin's 1933 collaboration Lady for a Day, with a screenplay by Hal Kanter and Harry Tugend from the Riskin-Runyon material. Aside from an industrial film directed for Martin-Marietta in 1964, it was Capra's final effort as a director.

== Personal life and family ==
Unlike his frequent collaborator Frank Capra, who was a conservative Republican, Riskin was a New Deal Democrat.

Riskin married actress Fay Wray in 1942. They had three children: Susan (born 1936), Robert (born 1943), and Victoria (born 1945). (Susan was the child of Wray's first marriage and was adopted by Riskin in 1942.) They remained married until his death on September 20, 1955. George Jessel read the eulogy at Riskin's funeral. Interment was at Inglewood Park Cemetery, Inglewood, California.

Riskin's older brother, Everett (born 1895), was a Hollywood film producer (1934–1952). He produced many noteworthy films, including The Thin Man Goes Home, written by Robert.

A biography by Ian Scott, In Capra's Shadow: The Life and Career of Screenwriter Robert Riskin, was published in 2006 by the University Press of Kentucky.

== Selected filmography ==
- The Miracle Woman (1931)
- Men in Her Life (1931)
- Platinum Blonde (1931)
- Vanity Street (1932)
- American Madness (1933)
- Ann Carver's Profession (1933)
- Lady for a Day (1933)
- It Happened One Night (1934)
- Broadway Bill (1934)
- Carnival (1935)
- The Whole Town's Talking (1935)
- Mr. Deeds Goes to Town (1936)
- When You're in Love (1937) also director
- Lost Horizon (1937)
- You Can't Take It with You (1938)
- Meet John Doe (1941)
- The Thin Man Goes Home (1945)
- Magic Town (1947) also producer
- Riding High (1950)
- Mister 880 (1950)
- Half Angel (1951)
- Here Comes the Groom (1951)
- Pocketful of Miracles (1961)

== Awards ==
=== Academy Awards ===
Won:

- Best Writing, Adaptation (It Happened One Night, 1935)

Nominated:

- Best Writing, Adaptation (Lady for a Day, 1934)
- Best Writing, Screenplay (Mr. Deeds Goes to Town, 1937)
- Best Writing, Screenplay (You Can't Take It with You, 1939)
- Best Writing, Motion Picture Story (Here Comes the Groom, 1952)

=== Lifetime Achievement Awards ===
- Laurel Award for Screenwriting Achievement

== See also ==
- List of Russian Americans
- List of Russian Academy Award winners and nominees
