= You Can't Take It with You (film) =

1938 film by Frank Capra

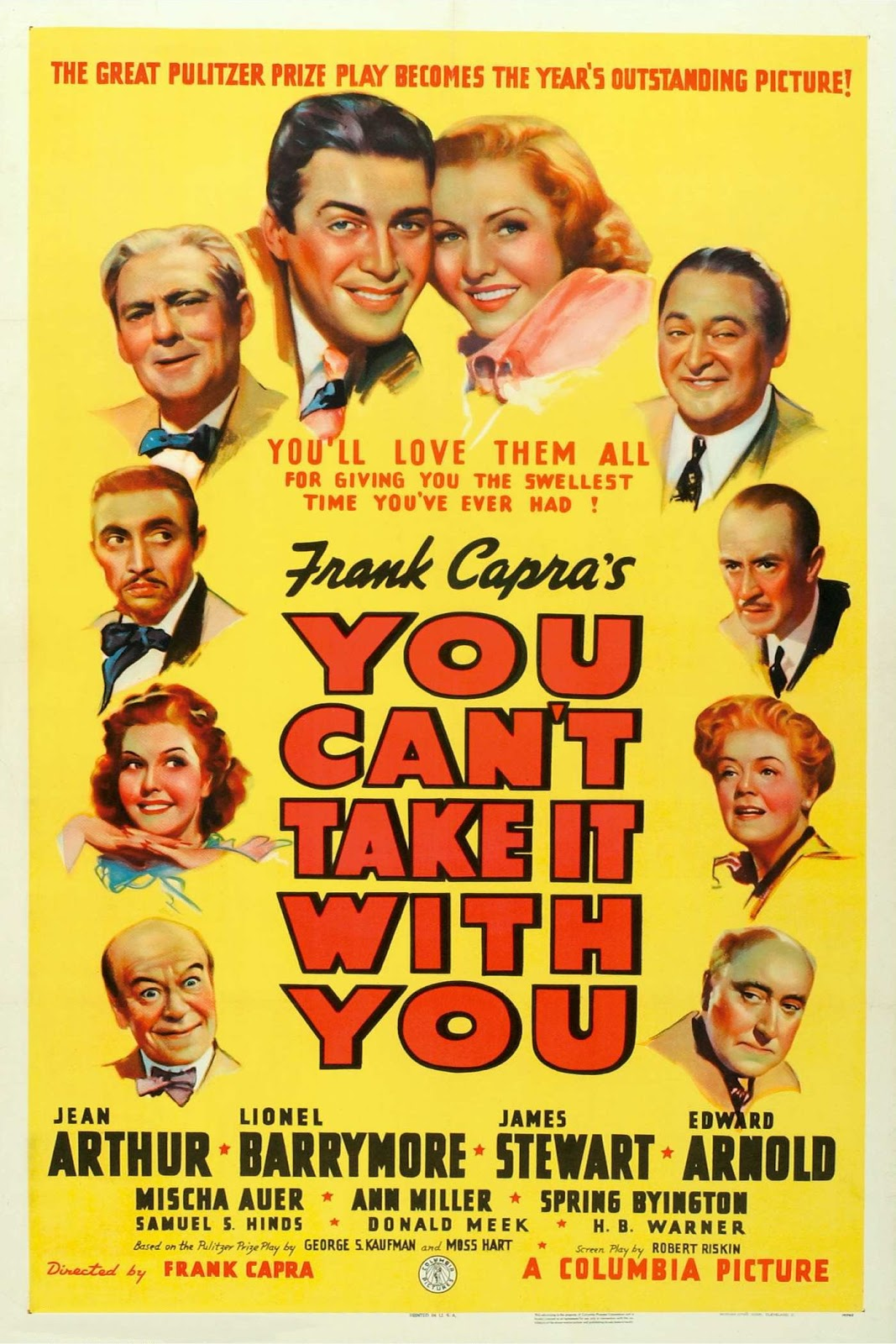
- Theatrical release poster
- Directed by: Frank Capra
- Screenplay by: Robert Riskin
- Based on: You Can't Take It with You; 1936 play by George Kaufman and Moss Hart
- Produced by: Frank Capra
- Starring: Jean Arthur; Lionel Barrymore; James Stewart; Edward Arnold; Mischa Auer; Ann Miller; Spring Byington; Samuel S. Hinds; Donald Meek; H. B. Warner
- Cinematography: Joseph Walker
- Edited by: Gene Havlick
- Music by: Dimitri Tiomkin
- Production company: Columbia Pictures
- Distributed by: Columbia Pictures
- Release dates: August 23, 1938 (int'l press preview); September 1, 1938 (New York City); September 29, 1938 (U.S.)
- Running time: 126 minutes
- Country: United States
- Language: English
- Budget: US$1,644,736 (est.)
- Box office: US$2,137,575 (U.S. rentals); US$5,295,526 (int'l rentals)

You Can't Take It with You is a 1938 American screwball romantic comedy film directed by Frank Capra, and starring Jean Arthur, Lionel Barrymore, James Stewart, and Edward Arnold. Adapted by Robert Riskin from the Pulitzer Prize-winning 1936 play of the same name by George S. Kaufman and Moss Hart, the film is about a man from a family of rich snobs who becomes engaged to a woman from a good-natured but decidedly eccentric family.

The film was a critical and commercial success. At the 11th Academy Awards, the film received two: Best Picture (Outstanding Production) and Best Director for Frank Capra. This was Capra's third Oscar for Best Director in just five years, following It Happened One Night (1934) and Mr. Deeds Goes to Town (1936).

== Plot ==
Successful Wall Street banker Anthony P. Kirby returns from Washington, D.C., where he completed a highly lucrative deal granting him a government-sanctioned munitions monopoly. He announces he has purchased a twelve-block area encircling a competitor's factory, to force him out of business. One household is refusing to sell, however. Kirby instructs his real-estate broker, John Blakely, to offer the household a huge sum, and if they still refuse, to cause trouble for the family.

Kirby's son, Tony, a vice president in the family company, has fallen in love with a company stenographer, Alice Sycamore. When Tony proposes marriage, Alice is worried that his affluent family will look down on her family. In fact, Alice is the only relatively normal member of the eccentric Sycamore family, led by Grandpa Martin Vanderhof. Other family members include Alice's parents Penny, a playwright, and Paul, who manufactures fireworks in the cellar; her sister Essie Carmichael, an aspiring dancer who makes homemade candies; and Essie's husband Ed, a musician and printer who delivers Essie's candies. Unbeknownst to the Kirbys, Alice's family lives in the house that will not sell. Unwittingly, Grandpa is protecting not only his property but the families and businesses in the twelve-block area Kirby wants.

Kirby and his wife strongly disapprove of Tony's choice for marriage. Tony not only loves Alice but feels she encourages his taste for spontaneous fun and farcical humor. Before she accepts, Alice insists that Tony bring his parents to meet their future in-laws, but when Tony purposely brings his parents a day earlier than planned (reasoning that the two families should meet as they are, not in a formal "stuffed-shirt" setting), the Sycamore family is caught off-guard, and the house is in disarray. As the Kirbys are leaving after a disastrous meeting, the police arrive to arrest Ed for flyers he placed in Essie's candy boxes to advertise Paul's fireworks, and which the police perceive as communist propaganda. When the fireworks in the cellar accidentally go off, they arrest everyone in the house.

Held in the drunk tank preparing to see the night-court judge, Mrs. Kirby repeatedly insults Alice and makes her feel unworthy of Tony, while Grandpa explains to Kirby the importance of having friends, and that despite all the wealth and success in business, "you can't take it with you." At the court hearing, the judge dismisses the charge for disturbing the peace against Grandpa and fines him $100 for the illegal fireworks; Grandpa's neighborhood friends pitch in to pay the fine. The judge refuses to dismiss the charges against the Kirbys unless they explain why they were at the Vanderhof house. Grandpa covers for the Kirbys by claiming it was to discuss selling the house, but Alice reveals it was because she was engaged to Tony, before spurning him because of how poorly she has been treated by his family. This causes a sensation in the papers, and Alice flees the city.

With Alice gone, Grandpa sells the house, thus meaning all his neighbors must vacate their properties. As a result, the Kirby companies merge, creating a huge fluctuation in the stock market and ruining Ramsey, Kirby's competitor. Tony tells his father that he is quitting his job at the company, which he never wanted in the first place. Ramsey dies from a heart failure after confronting Kirby for being ruthless and a failure of a man, saying he too will end up ruined, alone and friendless. Realizing Ramsey was right, Kirby abruptly leaves the board meeting where the contract signing is scheduled to occur.

As the Vanderhofs are vacating the house, Tony tries to speak with Alice, who locks herself in her room. Kirby arrives and talks privately with Grandpa, sharing his realization. Grandpa responds by inviting him to play a duet of "Polly Wolly Doodle" on the harmonica that he gave Kirby. The rest of the family join in the merriment, while Alice and Tony happily reconcile after Kirby expresses his approval of their marriage. Later, at the dinner table, Grandpa says grace for the Sycamore family and the Kirbys, revealing that Kirby has sold back the houses on the block.

== Cast ==
- Jean Arthur as Alice Sycamore
- Lionel Barrymore as Grandpa Martin Vanderhof
- James Stewart as Tony Kirby
- Edward Arnold as Anthony P. Kirby
- Mischa Auer as Potap Kolenkhov
- Ann Miller as Essie Carmichael
- Spring Byington as Penelope "Penny" Sycamore
- Samuel S. Hinds as Paul Sycamore
- Donald Meek as Poppins, an accountant at Kirby's bank
- H. B. Warner as Ramsey
- Halliwell Hobbes as DePinna
- Dub Taylor as Ed Carmichael
- Mary Forbes as Meriam Kirby, Anthony's wife
- Lillian Yarbo as Rheba
- Eddie Anderson as Donald
- Clarence Wilson as John Blakeley, Kirby's real estate broker
- Josef Swickard as the Professor
- Ann Doran as Maggie O'Neill
- Christian Rub as Mr. Schmidt
- Bodil Rosing as Mrs. Schmidt
- Charles Lane as Wilbur G. Henderson, Internal Revenue agent
- Harry Davenport as the Night Court Judge
- Ward Bond as Mike, a Detective (uncredited)
- James Millican as a Policeman (uncredited)

== Production ==
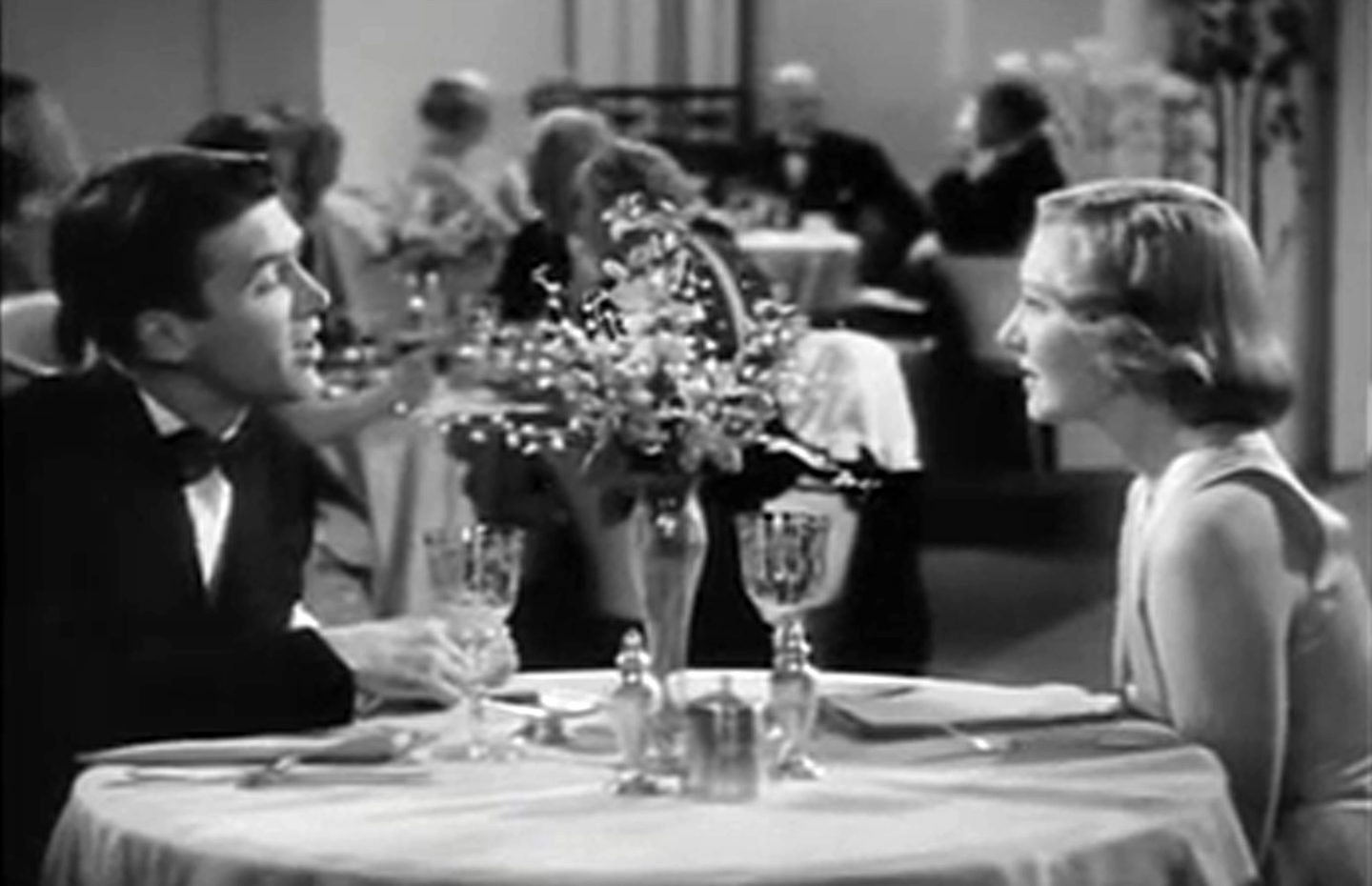
James Stewart and Jean Arthur in You Can't Take It with You

In 1937, Harry Cohn of Columbia Pictures bought the film rights of the original play for $200,000 ($3,589,000 in 2019).

After seeing actor James Stewart portray "a sensitive, heart-grabbing role in MGM's Navy Blue and Gold", Frank Capra cast Stewart for the role of leading male character, Tony Kirby, to "[fit] his concept of idealized America".

Barrymore's infirmity was incorporated into the plot of the film. His character was on crutches the entire movie, which was said to be due to an accident from sliding down the banister. In reality, it was due to his increasing arthritis – earlier in the year he had been forced to withdraw from the movie A Christmas Carol.

Ann Miller, who plays Essie Carmichael, was only 15 when You Can't Take It with You was filmed.

== Reception ==
Frank Nugent of The New York Times called the film "a grand picture, which will disappoint only the most superficial admirers of the play". The movie premiered at the Radio City Music Hall. Variety called it "fine audience material and over the heads of no one. The comedy is wholly American, wholesome, homespun, human, appealing, and touching in turn." The review suggested that "it could have been edited down a bit here and there, though as standing it is never tiresome". Film Daily wrote: "Smoothly directed, naturally acted and carefully produced, 'You Can't Take It With You' has all the elements of screen entertainment that the fans could wish for." "Excellent", wrote Harrison's Reports. "Robert Riskin did a fine job in adapting it from the stage play for he wisely placed emphasis on the human rather than on the farcical side of the story; yet he did this without sacrificing any of the comedy angles." John Mosher of The New Yorker thought that the stage version was superior, writing that many of the story's new additions for the screen made the film "a long one and at times a ponderous thing, the more so the further from the play the screen version strays".

Reviewing the film in 2010, James Berardinelli wrote that it "hasn't fared as well as the director's better, more timeless offerings" due to the dated nature of screwball comedies and the "innocence permeating the movie that doesn't play as well during an era when audiences value darkness in even the lightest of comedies. Still, You Can't Take it with You provides a pleasant enough two hours along with a reminder of how era-specific the criteria for winning an Oscar are". Leonard Maltin gave it three and a half of four stars: "George S. Kaufman—Moss Hart play about eccentric but blissfully happy household becomes prime Capracorn, not quite as compelling today but ... still highly entertaining." Leslie Halliwell gave it two of four stars: "A hilarious, warm and witty play is largely changed into a tirade against big business, but the Capra expertise is here in good measure and the stars all pull their weight."

Rotten Tomatoes gives the film a fresh rating of 94% from 79 reviews and an average rating of 7.50/10; the consensus for the film summarizes: "It's predictably uplifting fare from Frank Capra, perhaps the most consciously uplifting of all great American directors – but thanks to immensely appealing performances and a nimble script, You Can't Take It with You is hard not to love."

== Accolades ==
=== Academy Awards ===
Wins

- Best Picture: Columbia Pictures
- Best Director: Frank Capra

Nominations

- Best Supporting Actress: Spring Byington
- Best Writing (Screenplay): Robert Riskin
- Best Cinematography: Joseph Walker
- Best Film Editing: Gene Havlick
- Best Sound Recording: Columbia Studio Sound Department, John P. Livadary, Sound Director

== Adaptations ==
You Can't Take it with You was adapted as a one-hour radio play on the October 2, 1939, broadcast of Lux Radio Theatre with Edward Arnold, Robert Cummings and Fay Wray.

== In popular culture ==
A line from this film, "Confidentially, she stinks!", said by Kolenkov the ballet master about one of his students, was used in a few Looney Tunes cartoons from the 1940s.

== Digital restoration ==
In 2015, Sony Pictures Studios, Cineric, MTI Film, and Chace Audio by Deluxe digitally restored the film from surviving film elements, removing dirt, tears, scratches and other artifacts to emulate the film's original look.
