= Surviving the Game =

1994 film by Ernest Dickerson

- Theatrical release poster
- Directed by: Ernest R. Dickerson
- Written by: Eric Bernt
- Produced by: David Permut
- Starring: Ice-T; Rutger Hauer; Charles S. Dutton; John C. McGinley; William McNamara; Gary Busey; F. Murray Abraham
- Cinematography: Bojan Bazelli
- Edited by: Samuel D. Pollard
- Music by: Stewart Copeland
- Production companies: New Line Cinema; David Permut Productions
- Distributed by: New Line Cinema
- Release date: April 15, 1994
- Running time: 96 minutes
- Country: United States
- Language: English
- Budget: $7.4 million
- Box office: $7.7 million

Surviving the Game is a 1994 American action-adventure film directed by Ernest R. Dickerson and written by Eric Bernt. It is loosely based on the 1924 short story "The Most Dangerous Game" by Richard Connell. The film stars Ice-T, Rutger Hauer, Charles S. Dutton, John C. McGinley, William McNamara, Gary Busey, and F. Murray Abraham.

Surviving the Game was released in the United States on April 15, 1994, by New Line Cinema. The film received negative reviews from critics and was a box office bomb, grossing $7.7 million against a production budget of $7.4 million (not including advertisement and distribution costs).

== Plot ==
Jack Mason, a homeless man from Seattle, Washington, loses his only friends—his pet dog Mingo and fellow vagrant Hank—within a day of each other. The dejected Mason attempts to commit suicide but is saved by Walter Cole, who witnessed Mason avoid the soup kitchen Cole is working with. Cole refers him to businessman Thomas Burns, owner of Hell's Canyon Outfitters. Burns offers Mason a job as a hunting guide. Despite his initial misgivings, Mason accepts.

Flying to a remote cabin surrounded by acres of woods, Mason meets the rest of the hunting party, all of whom paid $50,000 for the privilege of being there. In addition to Burns and Cole, the party includes: Ted "Doc" Hawkins, a retired Central Intelligence Agent and psychiatrist who's also the founder of HCO; Texas oil magnate John Griffin; and wealthy father-and-son Wall Street executives Derek Wolfe Senior and Junior. On the first night, all the men chat over dinner. Mason receives cigarettes from Hawkins, who relays a story from his childhood about how his father forced him to fight and kill his own dog as a coming-of-age ritual to become a man.

The following morning, Mason is awakened with a gun in his face by Cole, who explains that the men are not hunting any animals, but rather Mason himself. Mason is given a head start with only the time it takes the others to eat breakfast. After fleeing the area, Mason gets an idea and turns back. The hunters finish breakfast and go after him. The younger Wolfe is horrified at the thought of committing murder, but is pushed into it by his father. The hunters race off into the forest after Mason, who has surreptitiously returned to the cabin in search of weapons. Instead he finds a trophy room, filled with the preserved heads of victims from previous hunts.

Mason rigs the cabin to explode, using aviation fuel from a nearby shed. The hunters rush into the cabin. Hawkins engages Mason in a fistfight while the others are rescuing Derek Senior. Hawkins is knocked into the cabin just as it explodes and dies.

The remaining hunters track Mason back into the forest. Using the scent from lit cigarettes, Mason lures Griffin away from the others and takes him hostage. The two talk overnight and learn about each other. Griffin is taking part in the hunt to vent his rage after a homeless man killed his daughter months ago. His anger towards Mason, whom he knows is homeless, was exacerbated by Mason saying he had killed his wife and daughter. However, Mason actually meant they died in an apartment fire and he could not save them. After Griffin is rediscovered by the group, he says he will not continue the hunt. In response, Cole murders Griffin to prevent any legal conflicts.

Mason sabotages Cole's ATV. When the hunters attempt to give chase, Cole's legs are destroyed in an explosion. Burns kills Cole by applying pressure to Cole's neck with his fingers. The remaining hunters, Burns and the Wolfe duo, attempt to pursue Mason over a ravine, but Mason has not actually crossed and is instead hiding. He tries to cause them to fall into the ravine while they are trapped on the crossing. The younger Wolfe takes a fatal fall and his father vows revenge.

That night, Mason kills Wolfe Sr. in a struggle. In the morning, Burns tricks Mason into approaching the plane, which he has rigged to explode. Thinking he has killed Mason, Burns departs for the city. Days later, back in Seattle, Burns disguises himself as a priest and prepares to flee, ignoring calls from Wolfe Sr.'s wife inquiring about her husband and son's whereabouts. Mason bests Burns in a fight and holds a gun to his head, but deliberately does not fire it and walks away. Burns picks up the gun, not realizing it has been sabotaged. When Burns pulls the trigger, it backfires, killing him as Mason walks away.

== Cast ==
- Ice-T as Jack Mason, a homeless man suffering from depression after the death of his wife and child.
- Rutger Hauer as Thomas Burns, a businessman that leads the hunting team.
- Charles S. Dutton as Walter Cole, Burns' partner who picks the "prey".
- Gary Busey as "Doc" Hawkins, a CIA psychologist and the founder of the hunting team.
- F. Murray Abraham as Derek Wolfe Sr., a Wall Street executive who takes great delight in hunting the "nobodies" that are picked for the prey.
- John C. McGinley as John Griffin, an oil tycoon suffering from asthma and still grieving over the murder of his daughter.
- William McNamara as Derek Wolfe Jr., the son of Mr. Wolfe Sr. and the only one in the team oblivious to their game.
- Jeff Corey as Hank, another homeless man, WWII U.S. Navy veteran, and Mason's best friend.

== Filming locations ==
The film's city scenes are set in Seattle, Washington. However, in some shots, the skyline of Philadelphia is used. The outdoor scenes are supposed to take place across the Oregon border, in the U.S. Northwest. However, they were filmed in locations of Entiat and Wenatchee, Washington. Lake Wenatchee and Wenatchee National Forest are both featured in the film.

== Reception ==
Surviving the Game received mostly negative reviews. It currently holds a 35% approval rating on Rotten Tomatoes based on 20 reviews, with an average rating of 4.6/10.

On At the Movies, Gene Siskel praised Ice-T's performance and called Surviving the Game "a good B-movie for the action crowd," and gave it a "thumbs up." His colleague Roger Ebert said he could not recommend the film, lamenting its predictability, though he agreed with Siskel that Ice-T was a good actor and that the film contained "a lot of good scenes." Siskel implored Ebert to reconsider, noting Ebert's longstanding championing of "B" movies, but Ebert said conclusively he wouldn't change his mind.

Entertainment Weekly's Owen Gleiberman called the film "Cliffhanger with one third the firepower," saying that Dickerson does little to differentiate from other films in the genre. He did give praise to the cinematography and the efforts of the main cast, singling out Ice-T for having on-screen charisma but being a bit unconvincing as an action star, concluding that: "Still, for a few moments there, the movie gives Robert Bly just what he deserves." Marjorie Baumgarten of The Austin Chronicle was critical of the script's characters and overall message as being "out-of-whack and sophomoric" but gave credit to the actors portraying them and the production team for being a vital element in Dickerson's filmmaking, saying: "He has a definite flair for action pictures but the stunning contributions from cinematographer Bojan Bazelli add immeasurably to the movie."

=== Box office ===
Surviving the Game debuted at number 6 at the box office and grossed $7.7 million in the US.

== See also ==
- List of American films of 1994
