= Magic Town =

1947 film by William A. Wellman

- 1947 theatrical poster
- Directed by: William A. Wellman
- Written by: Robert Riskin
- Story by: Robert Riskin; Joseph Krumgold
- Produced by: Robert Riskin; William A. Wellman
- Starring: James Stewart; Jane Wyman; Kent Smith; Ned Sparks; Wallace Ford; Regis Toomey
- Cinematography: Joseph F. Biroc
- Edited by: Sherman Todd; Richard G. Wray
- Music by: Roy Webb
- Production company: Robert Riskin Productions
- Distributed by: RKO Radio Pictures
- Release dates: October 7, 1947 (Premiere-New York City); October 12, 1947 (U.S.)
- Running time: 103 minutes
- Country: United States
- Language: English
- Box office: $2 million (US rentals)

Magic Town is a 1947 American comedy film directed by William A. Wellman and starring James Stewart and Jane Wyman. The picture is one of the first films about the then-new practice of public opinion polling. The film was inspired by the Middletown studies. It is also known as The Magic City.

The "magic" of the title is the mathematical miracle (as it is called in the film) that certain towns can be used to fairly accurately predict the actions of the whole country.

This was character actor Donald Meek’s final film.

== Plot ==
Lawrence "Rip" Smith is a former basketball player and veteran who now runs a company that performs polls and consumer surveys. Lately he has started obsessing about being able to find a perfect mathematical "miracle formula" to perform the perfect survey, and compete for real with his rival companies. Because he lacks funds, he is far behind his number one rival, George Stringer.

One day Rip discovers that a survey made by a friend and ex-Army colleague of his, Hoopendecker, in the small town of Grandview, exactly matches one that Stringer has made on a national level. Rip concludes that the small town demographic is a perfect match for the country as a whole, and believes he has finally found his miracle formula.

Eager to test his theory, Rip sells a survey on progressive education to a client, with a promise the result will stand for the whole country. Furthermore, he promises to deliver the result the same day as Stringer's company, even though the rival has been working on the project for quite some time.

Rip and his team of professionals then travel to Grandview to perform the survey. They are pretending to be insurance salesmen. But trouble starts already when Rip overhears a conversation between a woman named Mary Peterman trying to convince the mayor to expand the town and build a number of new buildings: a civic center. Rip wants this town to stay exactly as it is, so he can make his perfect surveys, mirroring the demographic of the country. Rip holds an electrifying speech to preserve the town, and the conservative members of the town council listen to him rather than Mary, whose proposition is laid to the side.

Mary writes a bold and angry editorial against Rip in the local newspaper, which is run by her family. Rip starts a charm offensive towards Mary to soften her up, but she holds her ground. The two combatants are attracted to each other though. They spend a lot of time together while Rip secretly gathers information for his survey. One of Rip's colleagues warns him that he is becoming too involved in the subject he is supposed to be studying, but Rip is blinded by his attraction to Mary. Rip starts coaching the school basketball team, and attends a school dance where he meets Mary's family. When Rip later slips away to talk to his client over the phone, Mary follows him, eavesdrops on the conversation, and finds out the truth about Rip being in town.

Angered by his deceit, she publishes the story in the newspaper the next day. A larger nationwide paper picks up the story, and soon the town is crawling with reporters. The town is called "the public opinion capital of the U.S." and its inhabitants start selling their views on consumer products on every street corner. The city council start making bold plans to expand the town, and both Rip and Mary feel ashamed of what they have done to change the town structure. Rip leaves Grandview and Mary and returns home. Soon enough a strange poll from Grandview says Americans would want a female president. The town is ridiculed in the press and the expansion plans get an abrupt ending.

But Rip cannot forget Mary, and he returns to Grandview to reveal his true feelings. Mary admits she has feelings for him too, but also tells Rip that they have to fix the mess they have caused in Grandview before they can start a relationship. Rip starts by talking to a Grandview U.S. Senator, Wilton, to get help from him raising money to save the town. They display their plan in front of the city council, but the lead council member, Richard Nickleby, is negative. Upset, Rip tells Nickleby that he is "walking out on the team".

Later, Rip learns from Nickleby's son Hank that his father already has sold land where the main expansion would take place to a company. To stop this, Rip manages to publish parts of the council speech a few weeks earlier, where it said that they would expand the town "with their own hands". A lot of inhabitants who read the article start demanding that the city council build on the designated land to save the reputation of the town.

It turns out the property sale agreement was not formally correct and the land is returned to the town. The inhabitants all pitch in to build a civic center on the land, and Rip and Mary become a couple.

== Cast ==
- James Stewart as Rip Smith
- Jane Wyman as Mary Peterman
- Kent Smith as Hoopendecker
- Ned Sparks as Ike
- Wallace Ford as Lou Dicketts
- Regis Toomey as Ed Weaver
- Ann Doran as Mrs. Weaver
- Donald Meek as Mr. Twiddle
- Ann Shoemaker as Ma Peterman
- Mickey Kuhn as Hank Nickleby
- George Irving as Senator Wilton
- Julia Dean as Mrs. Wilton
- Paul Scardon as Hodges
- Ray Walker as Stinger's Associate
- Harry Holman as Mayor
- Robert Dudley as Dickey
- George Chandler as Bus Driver
- Edgar Dearing as Questioning Grandview Citizen
- Dick Elliott as New Arrival
- Franklyn Farnum as Townsman
- Bess Flowers as Mayor's Secretary
- Gabriel Heatter as Gabriel Heatter - Radio Newscaster
- Tom Kennedy as Moving Man
- Knox Manning as Radio Broadcaster
- Ken Niles as Reporter
- Vic Perrin as Elevator Starter
- Snub Pollard as Townsman
- Cyril Ring as Newspaper Man
- Dick Wessel as Moving Man
- Lee "Lasses" White as Shoe Shine Man
- Joe Yule as Radio Comic

== Reception ==
As with Stewart's previous film, It's a Wonderful Life, the film was a box office flop at the time of its release.

The film recorded a loss of $350,000. In June 1953, Bank of America repossessed the film because of revenue deficits.
