= American Madness =

1932 film

- Film poster
- Directed by: Frank Capra
- Written by: Robert Riskin
- Produced by: Frank Capra; Harry Cohn
- Starring: Walter Huston
- Cinematography: Joseph Walker
- Edited by: Maurice Wright
- Music by: Mischa Bakaleinikoff (uncredited); Karl Hajos (uncredited)
- Production company: Columbia Pictures
- Release date: August 4, 1932
- Running time: 75 minutes
- Country: United States
- Language: English

American Madness is a 1932 American pre-Code drama film directed by Frank Capra and starring Walter Huston as a New York banker embroiled in scandal.

== Plot ==
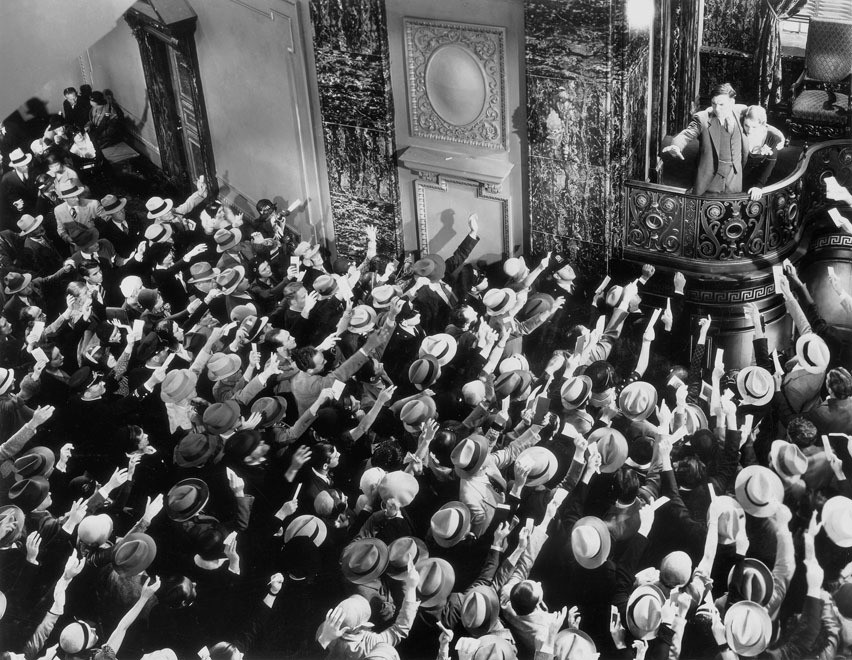
Walter Huston and Constance Cummings face a crowd of frantic depositors.

At the Union National Bank, the directors are concerned because they think that bank president Tom Dickson has loaned too much money to people who are bad risks during the Great Depression era, and they threaten to replace him. Dickson refuses to resign, arguing that he loans to people whom he knows are good risks, that none of them has defaulted and that loaning the money keeps it circulating preventing an even worse economic depression.

Dickson's wife Phyllis is planning a special celebration for their anniversary, but he has forgotten it and made business plans. He promises to take her out the next night but then arranges another business meeting for the same time.

Three gangsters led by Dude Finlay enter the office of chief cashier Cyril Cluett to intimidate him. He owes them $50,000 in gambling debts, and they promise not to hurt him if he helps them rob the bank that night. They advise him to arrange an alibi for midnight, when the robbery will occur. Seeing Phyllis, Cluett claims to have always been in love with her and asks to take her out that night, and with Dickson unavailable, she agrees. However, they are seen by Matt Brown, who assumes the worst about Dickson's marriage.

Cluett resets the vault's time lock before leaving to meet Phyllis. They go to a play and then to his apartment, but Brown is there waiting for them, hoping to break up the affair. Meanwhile, at the bank, the gang steals $100,000, but they also murder a guard who sees them.

The next day, rumors about the amount stolen become wildly exaggerated and cause a run on the bank. Dickson tries frantically to arrange emergency money to meet the withdrawals but cannot, and the board will not help, preferring to force him out. The bank has enough resources to pay all depositors eventually, but its reputation for safety will be ruined if the depositors cannot withdraw money immediately.

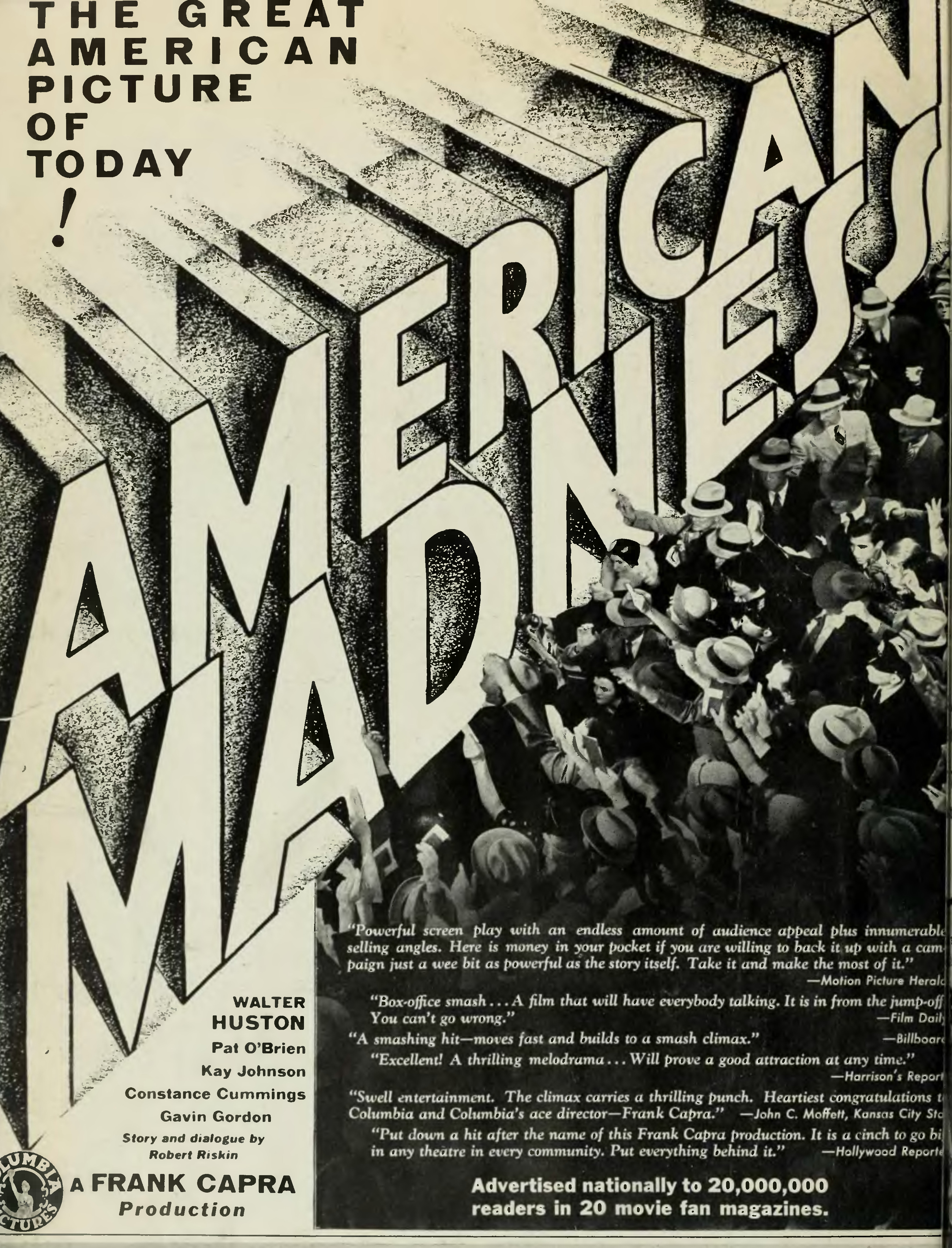
American Madness ad from The Film Daily, 1932

Meanwhile, the police suspect Brown, who will only say that he had been at home with a married woman whom he will not name. They hear that Cluett had been seen with Dude Finlay and turn their suspicions to him. When confronted with challenges to his alibi, he implicates Phyllis. Dickson, believing the worst about his marriage, becomes depressed and contemplates suicide. After agreeing to resign his position, his wife arrives to reconcile and talk him down from killing himself.

As the bank runs out of cash, Dickson's subordinates have an idea. They call on the people whom Dickson has helped with loans in the past to deposit all the money that they can afford. When the board sees the loyal depositors, they rally in support of Dickson, arranging immediate deliveries of money themselves. The bank is saved and Dickson recovers his positive attitude and keeps his job.

Dickson awards Brown a promotion, and urges Brown to marry his girlfriend, Dickson's own secretary Helen. He then asks Helen to arrange a luxurious sea voyage for himself and Phyllis.

== Cast ==
- Walter Huston as Thomas A. Dickson
- Pat O'Brien as Matt
- Kay Johnson as Mrs Phyllis Dickson
- Constance Cummings as Helen
- Gavin Gordon as Cyril Cluett
- Arthur Hoyt as Ives
- Robert Emmett O'Connor as Inspector
- Sterling Holloway as Oscar (uncredited)

== Production ==
American Madness was the third film in a series of legendary collaborations between Frank Capra and Robert Riskin. Riskin was the co-author of the 1927 play Bless You Sister, which became the basis of Capra's drama The Miracle Woman (1931); he then contributed dialogue to Capra's follow-up project, the comedy Platinum Blonde (1931). With American Madness the next year, Riskin wrote his first screenplay.

The film contains one zoom shot, which is notable for its use of the new three-element Cooke-Varo lens.

== Reception ==
Award-winning British filmmaker Mike Leigh included American Madness in his list of the 10 greatest films of all time when he participated in the 2012 Sight & Sound film poll.
