= Eric Bernt =

American screenwriter

Eric Bernt has built most of his career as a writer for Hollywood films. He made his directorial debut in 2005 with the movie Vegas Baby. He has given lectures at universities on the topic of screenwriting.

== Writer - Filmography ==
- The Echo (2008) (written by)
- Vegas Baby (2005) (written by)
- Highlander: Endgame (2000) (story)
- Romeo Must Die (2000) (screenplay)
- Virtuosity (1995) (written by)
- Surviving the Game (1994) (written by)

== Director - Filmography ==
- Vegas Baby (2005)
- Bachelor Party Vegas (2006)

== Actor - Filmography ==
- Virtuosity (1995) - Building Supervisor

== Future projects - Filmography ==
- Infected (by Scott Sigler)
