= The Whole Town's Talking =

1935 film by John Ford

- 1949 theatrical re-release poster
- Directed by: John Ford
- Screenplay by: Jo Swerling; Robert Riskin
- Based on: "Jail Breaker"; Collier's (1932) by W. R. Burnett
- Produced by: John Ford; Lester Cowan (uncredited)
- Starring: Edward G. Robinson; Jean Arthur
- Cinematography: Joseph August
- Edited by: Viola Lawrence
- Music by: Uncredited: Mischa Bakaleinikoff; Louis Silvers
- Production company: Columbia Pictures
- Distributed by: Columbia Pictures
- Release date: February 22, 1935
- Running time: 93 minutes
- Country: United States
- Language: English

The Whole Town's Talking (released in the United Kingdom as Passport to Fame) is a 1935 American crime comedy film starring Edward G. Robinson as a mild-mannered advertising clerk who bears a striking resemblance to an escaped convict, with Jean Arthur as his love interest. It was directed by John Ford from a screenplay by Jo Swerling and Robert Riskin, based on the short story "Jail Breaker" by W. R. Burnett, originally published in Collier's in August 1932. Burnett was also the author of the source material for Robinson's screen breakthrough, Little Caesar (1931).

== Plot ==
At an advertising firm, office manager Seaver is instructed by the boss, J.G. Carpenter, to fire the next employee who shows up late and to reward a particular employee, meek and mild-mannered clerk Arthur Ferguson Jones, with a raise, as he is never late. That morning, when Jones oversleeps and shows up late for work for the first time, Seaver is unsure whether to fire him or give him a raise. Shortly afterwards, Wilhelmina Clark, Jones's brash co-worker with whom he is secretly infatuated, also comes in late and is fired by Seaver. Seeing a picture of escaped convict "Killer" Mannion in the newspaper, Wilhelmina points out to the staff that he bears a striking resemblance to Jones.

While having lunch at a restaurant, Jones is approached by Wilhelmina, and as they talk, he reveals he is an aspiring writer and dreams of going to Shanghai. Upon seeing Mannion's picture in the newspaper, a fellow patron spots Jones and turns him over to the police, hoping for the $25,000 reward. Jones and Wilhelmina are both taken into custody and interrogated at the police station, where a nervous Jones protests his innocence. While Jones is still at the station, the real Mannion robs a bank. After Seaver arrives to establish Jones' identity, the district attorney gives Jones a special passport identifying him as not Mannion to prevent another mistaken arrest.

As Jones becomes a local celebrity, J.G. gets him to sign a contract with newspaperman Healy to be credited as the author of a series of ghostwritten articles on Mannion. After the three men get drunk in J.G.'s private office, Jones kisses Wilhelmina and orders Seaver to rehire her. That night, Jones returns home to find Mannion at his apartment, demanding to let him use the passport at night to protect him during criminal undertakings, while Jones will have it during the day. In the morning, Mannion returns to the apartment, and Jones leaves for work, where Wilhelmina volunteers to be Jones's agent to ensure that he gets paid.

When the first installment of the newspaper series is published, Mannion orders Jones to have the series be turned into his reminiscences of the prison break. Jones' next article raises the suspicion of the police, as it includes details only the guards involved and Mannion would know. Wilhelmina visits Jones's apartment to bring him his first paycheck as an author, initially failing to recognize Mannion. Noticing Mannion's gun, Wilhelmina flees the apartment but is caught by Mannion before she can contact the police. The police complain that with "Jones" using his passport at night, they cannot stop Mannion from committing crimes, so the district attorney orders that Jones be placed under protective custody in prison.

After learning that "Slugs" Martin, a fellow gangster who informed on Mannion, is also in protective custody, Mannion masquerades as Jones and kills Martin. Seaver picks Mannion up from prison, believing him to be Jones, only to be kidnapped and taken to Mannion's hideout with his other hostages, Wilhelmina and Jones's visiting aunt. Mannion schemes to have Jones killed in a police ambush by sending him to the bank disguised in a mustache to deposit money for his mother, thus convincing the police that Mannion is dead. He then has a henchman call the police with a tip-off that Mannion is about to rob the bank with a mustache on.

As Jones is about to walk into the bank, he realizes he has forgotten to bring the check and unwittingly leads the police back to the hideout while Mannion is out with a girlfriend. Upon his arrival, Jones is mistaken for Mannion by the waiting henchmen, who inadvertently reveal Mannion's plan to have Jones killed by the police. When the real Mannion returns unexpectedly, his gang kills him with a machine gun, thinking he is Jones. Jones then grabs the machine gun, locks up the gangsters, and frees the hostages. The police arrive to arrest the remaining gangsters. With Mannion dead, Jones collects the $25,000 reward and takes a cruise to Shanghai with Wilhelmina.

== Cast ==
- Edward G. Robinson as Arthur Ferguson Jones and "Killer" Mannion
- Jean Arthur as Wilhelmina Clark
- Arthur Hohl as Detective Sergeant Boyle
- James Donlan as Detective Sergeant Howe
- Arthur Byron as Spencer, district attorney
- Wallace Ford as Healy, Record reporter
- Donald Meek as Hoyt
- Etienne Girardot as Seaver, office manager
- Edward Brophy as "Slugs" Martin
- Paul Harvey as J.G. Carpenter
- Effie Ellsler as Aunt Agatha (uncredited)

=== Cast notes ===
- In his autobiography, All My Yesterdays, Edward G. Robinson wrote of Jean Arthur, "She was whimsical without being silly, unique without being nutty, a theatrical personality who was an untheatrical person. She was a delight to work with and to know."
- Lucille Ball has a small uncredited part as a bank employee, and Francis Ford, director John Ford's older brother, appears as a newspaper reporter at the dock.

== Production ==
The Whole Town's Talking – which had the working titles of Jail Breaker and Passport to Fame – was in production from October 24 to December 11, 1934. The film incorporated some footage originally shot for Columbia's 1931 film The Criminal Code.

Columbia Pictures borrowed Edward G. Robinson for this film from Warner Bros. – Robinson heard about the transactions through gossip columnist Louella Parsons. At the time Robinson's career was somewhat moribund and the star was tired of playing only gangsters. He was initially opposed to the project but changed his mind after reading the script. In retrospect The Whole Town's Talking has been seen as a turning point for Robinson, reviving his cinematic fortunes. Along with 1933's The Little Giant, 1938's A Slight Case of Murder, 1940's Brother Orchid, and 1942's Larceny, Inc., it was one of the few comedies Robinson made.

W. R. Burnett, who wrote the story that The Whole Town's Talking was based on, also wrote Little Caesar, which was the film that catapulted Robinson to stardom, and High Sierra, the film of which was a significant step for Humphrey Bogart in moving from playing gangsters to romantic lead.

== Reception ==
Contemporary reviews were overwhelmingly positive. Critics generally emphasized the impressive dual performance from Edward G. Robinson as well as the trick photography from Joseph August. The Hollywood Reporter called it "one of Robinson's best screen performances," dubbing it a "riotous satire" with "topnotch" writing. American Cinematographer included the film in its “Photography of the Month” section, citing two reviews that emphasized August's work.

Lionel Collier, for the British magazine, Picturegoer, gave the film a positive review, describing it as "both novel and amusing" and "so cleverly conceived and executed." He praised Edward G. Robinson and wrote that he "has many successes to his credit, but I venture to think that he has done nothing better than this brilliant interpretation of a dual role - that of gangster and a meek little clerk who resembles him so closely that he gets into an infinity of trouble. Robinson's differentiation between the two characters is strikingly good, and he brings both dramatic force and humour to his incisively human portrayals … The star holds the limelight all the time, but he is admirably supported by Jean Arthur."

Later reviewers have remained very kind to the film. Film critic and historian Jean Mitry said of the film that it is "...wonderfully cut and mounted, supercharged, taut like a spring, it is a work of total perfection in its genre",and Michael Costello of All Movie Guide wrote that "Ford directs and cuts the scenes with uncharacteristic rapidity, seeming to enjoy playing off the meek clerk against the anarchic gangster."

David Nusair writing for Reel Film Reviews in 2007, described the film as “an amiable little comedy that benefits greatly from the charisma of its two leads.” He observed that it “possesses the feel of a Frank Capra film”, which he attributed to the influence of Robert Ruskin who had worked on several Capra films, and that Ford “infuses the proceedings with an appropriately lighthearted touch”. Of the two stars, he wrote, “Robinson is surprisingly convincing as a character that’s essentially the antithesis of his tough guy persona, although, as Mannion, he does deliver as creepy and sinister a performance as one might’ve expected. Jean Arthur provides most of the film’s laughs.”

On the review aggregator website Rotten Tomatoes, the film holds an approval rating of 100% based on 13 reviews.
