= Bathsheba Garnett =

American actress (born 1925)

- Born: September 17, 1925 (age 100); Manhattan, New York, U.S.
- Occupations: Actress; acting coach
- Years active: 1984–2015

Bathsheba Garnett (born September 17, 1925) is an American actress and acting coach, best known for her portrayal of the main titular antagonist in Robert Eggers' acclaimed horror film The Witch. Garnett's career is distinguished by her unusually late start in acting, beginning at the age of 59, and her consistent work as a character actress in film and television.

== Career ==
Garnett was born in Manhattan, New York on September 17, 1925. She began acting at the age of 59, with her first credited role in the television movie The Guardian (1984), where she played Mrs. Jacobs. Also she appeared in Mean Girls (2004) as the German Teacher, and later played a homeless woman in the thriller P2 (2007). In Blindness (2008), she portrayed a patient known as the Woman of Ward Two, while in Adoration (2008) she took on the role of a Holocaust survivor. She also appeared in The Echo (2008) as an elderly Russian woman. Her most acclaimed performance came in The Witch (2015), where she played the sinister forest witch. At age 90, Garnett's unsettling portrayal contributed significantly to the film's atmosphere and critical success, cementing her reputation as a distinctive character actress. Bathsheba also appeared on Broadway.

In addition to film, Garnett worked extensively in television. She appeared in Goosebumps (1996) as the Old Crone, and later guest-starred in Sue Thomas: F.B.Eye (2004). Other television credits include Strange Luck (1995), Side Effects (1994), Bloodletting & Miraculous Cures (2010), and The Jon Dore Television Show (2009), where she played Mrs. Garnett.

== Personal life ==
Outside of her screen work, Garnett has also worked as an acting coach in New York. She left America and now resides in a nursing home in Tel Aviv, Israel.

== Filmography ==
- The Witch (2015) - The Witch
- Bloodletting & Miraculous Cures (2010) - Mrs. Goldberg
- The Ron James Show (2009)
- The Jon Dore Television Show (2009) - Mrs. Garnett
- The Echo (2008) - Old Russian Woman
- Adoration (2008) - Holocaust survivor
- Blindness (2008) - Woman of Ward Two
- P2 (2007) - Homeless Woman
- G-Spot (2006) - Jewish Woman
- Sue Thomas: F.B.Eye (2004) - Elderly Woman
- Mean Girls (2004) - German Teacher
- Mafia Doctor (2003) - Lucie Siena
- The X-Files (1996) - Woman
- Goosebumps (1996) - Old Crone
- Strange Luck (1995)
- Side Effects (1994) - Sadie Freedburg
- Family Pictures (1993) - Dr. Dusek
- The Last Best Year (1990) - Mrs. Morton
- The Guardian (1984) - Mrs. Jacobs
