= Lady for a Day =

1933 film by Frank Capra

- Movie poster
- Directed by: Frank Capra
- Written by: Robert Riskin
- Based on: Madame La Gimp; 1929 story in Hearst's International-Cosmopolitan by Damon Runyon
- Produced by: Harry Cohn
- Starring: Warren William; May Robson; Guy Kibbee; Glenda Farrell
- Cinematography: Joseph Walker
- Edited by: Gene Havlick
- Music by: Howard Jackson
- Color process: Black and white
- Production company: Columbia Pictures
- Distributed by: Columbia Pictures
- Release date: September 13, 1933
- Running time: 96 minutes
- Country: United States
- Language: English
- Budget: $300,000

Lady for a Day is a 1933 American pre-Code comedy-drama film directed by Frank Capra. The screenplay by Robert Riskin is based on the 1929 short story "Madame La Gimp" by Damon Runyon. It was the first film for which Capra received an Academy Award nomination for Best Director and the first Columbia Pictures release to be nominated for Best Picture. Capra also directed its 1961 remake, Pocketful of Miracles.

== Plot ==
The story focuses on Apple Annie, an aging and wretched fruit seller in New York City, whose daughter Louise has been raised in a Spanish convent since she was an infant. Louise has been led to believe her mother is a society matron named Mrs. E. Worthington Manville who lives at the Hotel Marberry. Annie discovers her charade is in danger of being uncovered when she learns Louise is sailing to New York with her fiancé Carlos and his father, Count Romero.

Among Annie's patrons are Dave the Dude, a gambling gangster who believes her apples bring him good luck, and his henchman Happy McGuire. Annie's friends from the street ask Dave to rent her an apartment at the Marberry and, although he initially declines, he has a change of heart and arranges for her to live in the lap of luxury in a palatial residence belonging to a friend. His girlfriend, nightclub owner Missouri Martin, helps transform Annie from a dowdy street peddler to an elegant dowager. Dave arranges for erudite pool hustler Henry G. Blake to pose as Annie's second husband, the dignified Judge Manville.

At the pier, an elegantly dressed Annie tearfully reunites with Louise. A group of Annie's friends from the streets are watching from a distance. One of the street people says that she can remember when Annie “always looked like that.” (We never know the details of Annie's history, but her upper-crust origins are clear.) When three society reporters become suspicious about Mrs. E. Worthington Manville, of whom they can find no public records, they are kidnapped by members of Dave's gang, and their prolonged disappearance leads the local newspapers to accuse the police department of incompetence.

A few days later, Blake – in the role of Judge Manville – announces he is planning a gala reception for Louise, Carlos, and Count Romero before they return to Spain, and he enlists Dave's guys and Missouri's dolls to pose as Annie's society friends. On the night of the reception, the police – certain Dave is responsible for the missing reporters – surround Missouri's club, where the gang has assembled for a final rehearsal. Dave calls Blake to advise him of their predicament, and Annie decides to confess everything to Count Romero. But fate – in the form of a sympathetic mayor and governor and their entourages – unexpectedly steps in and allows Annie to maintain her charade and keep Louise from learning the truth before she sails back to Spain with her husband-to-be.

== Cast ==
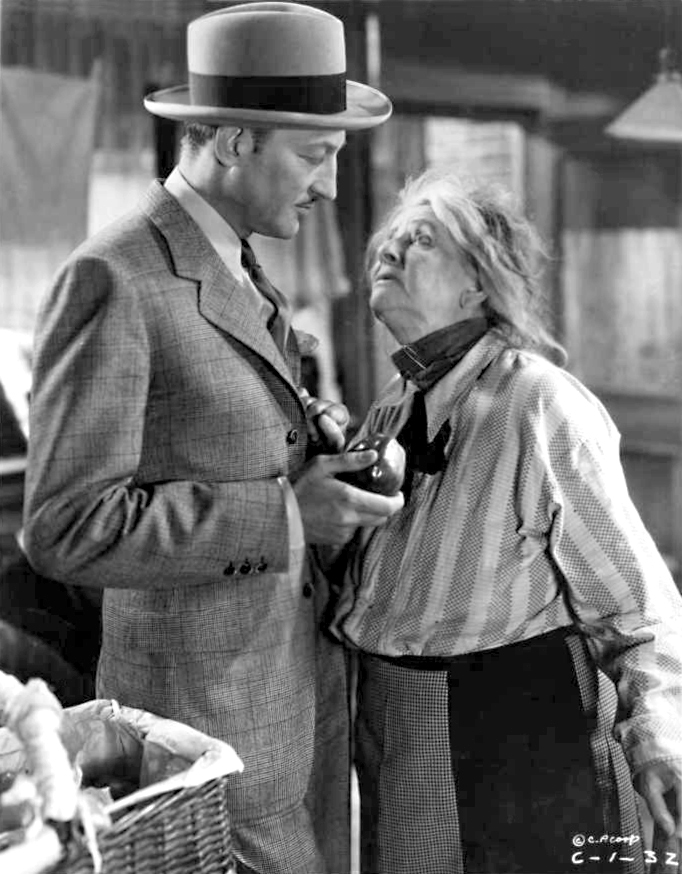
Dave the Dude (Warren William) and Apple Annie (May Robson) in Lady for a Day

- Warren William as Dave the Dude
- May Robson as Apple Annie
- Guy Kibbee as Judge Henry G. Blake
- Glenda Farrell as Missouri Martin
- Ned Sparks as Happy McGuire
- Nat Pendleton as Shakespeare
- Jean Parker as Louise, Annie's daughter
- Barry Norton as Carlos
- Walter Connolly as Count Romero
- Halliwell Hobbes as John, Rodney Kent's butler
- George Cooper as Cheesecake
- Hobart Bosworth as Governor
- Robert Emmett O'Connor as Police Inspector
- Samuel S. Hinds as Mayor
- Wallis Clark as Police Commissioner
- Edward LeSaint as Police Captain Moore
- William F. Sauls as Legless Man
- Ward Bond as Mounted Policeman
- Irving Bacon as Pool Player from Providence
- Forrester Harvey as Oscar, Annie's hotel confidant
- Leo White as Pierre, stylist
- Marc Lawrence as Nick, Man at reception who objects
- Harry Semels as The Greek, gambler

== Production ==
Damon Runyon's short story Madame La Gimp was published in the October 1929 issue of Cosmopolitan. Columbia Pictures purchased the screen rights in September 1932, and the studio scheduled the production to begin the following May, although director Frank Capra had misgivings about the project. He reminded studio head Harry Cohn he was "spending $300,000 on a picture in which the heroine is 70 years old," to which Cohn responded, "All I know is the thing's got a wallop. Go ahead." Robert Riskin was assigned to develop the story for the screen and wrote four drafts, submitting the last on May 6, 1933, three days before principal photography began. Aside from some minor revisions made during production, this final script was filmed intact. Riskin's version deviated from the original Runyon story primarily in that it linked its central character and a number of plot developments to the millions of Americans who were suffering as a result of the Great Depression. Runyon was pleased with the changes and later said, "Lady for a Day was no more my picture than Little Miss Marker, which, like the former picture, was almost entirely the result of the genius of the scenario writers and the director who worked on it."

Riskin had written his screenplay specifically for Robert Montgomery, but MGM refused to loan him to Columbia. He was among several performers Capra wanted but failed to secure for roles in the film. With Montgomery unavailable, Capra approached James Cagney and William Powell, but Warner Bros. refused to loan them out to work on this project. Capra's first choices for Apple Annie and Henry G. Blake, Marie Dressler and W.C. Fields, could not be cast because MGM and Paramount, respectively, wouldn't loan them out to Harry Cohn (perhaps fearing that the not yet prestigious Columbia would cheapen their actors' 7reputations) The director finally cast his film with an assortment of character actors, some already under contract to Columbia, others from Warner Bros. He also went to the Downtown Los Angeles neighborhood where he had sold newspapers as a boy and hired some of the street people who congregated there as extras who would add color to the film. Perhaps the most distinctive of the street characters was William F. Sauls, missing both legs, who moved about on a board with wheels. In the film, Sauls is at ground level while the police are discussing Dave the Dude, giving Sauls time to get to the Dude first. Capra remembered Sauls and brought him back to repeat the role in the 1961 remake.

One week before filming began, Capra offered the role of Apple Annie to 75-year-old May Robson, most of whose career had been spent performing on stage. In later years, Capra thought the fact she and most of the supporting players were unfamiliar to movie audiences helped the public accept them as the down-on-their-luck characters they were meant to be.

Just prior to the first preview in Hollywood in early July 1933, the film's title was changed from Madame La Gimp to Beggars' Holiday, then changed again before the film premiered at Radio City Music Hall on September 7. It went into general release on September 13 and within a very short time earned $600,000, twice its budget and a substantial sum for the period. According to the contract he had negotiated prior to making the film, Capra received 10% of the net profits. The film's success prompted the making of the 1934 film Lady by Choice, directed by David Burton and starring Carole Lombard. The only thing the two films have in common is Robson playing an alcoholic panhandler who has seen better days.

In the early 1950s, the original negative was lost while being transferred from one film lab to another for preservation work. For a period of time the only existing copy was a 35mm print owned by Capra, until he made a duplicate negative from it and donated a newly minted print to the Library of Congress. Columbia later sold the rights to the story to United Artists for $200,000, and Capra remade the film as Pocketful of Miracles with Bette Davis and Glenn Ford in 1961. The director claimed to prefer the remake to the original, although most critics and, in later years film historians and movie buffs, disagreed with his assessment.

The "Apple Annie" story transformed into Capra's Lady For A Day (and Pocketful of Miracles) has long been considered a natural source for a stage musical and a number of prominent writers, including Jerry Herman, David Shire and Richard Maltby Jr; the team of John Kander and Fred Ebb have all worked on unfinished and unrealized adaptations.

== Reception ==
Trade publisher Pete Harrison gave the film one of his rare "excellent" ratings: "It is perfect entertainment for the masses from every angle, in spite of the fact that the story is fantastic. It has human interest, excellent comedy situations, and pathos. May Robson gives an unusually good and restrained performance, never overacting or spoiling situations with too much sentiment." Mordaunt Hall of The New York Times called it "a merry tale with touches of sentiment, a picture which evoked laughter and tears from an audience at the first showing." He added, "Its plausibility may be open to argument, but its entertainment value is not to be denied. It has aspects of Barrie's The Old Lady Shows Her Medals and also more than a mere suggestion of Shaw's Pygmalion, set forth, as might be anticipated, in a more popular vein."

Variety said the film "asks the spectator to believe in the improbable. It's Hans Christian Andersen stuff written by a hard-boiled journalist and transferred to the screen by trick-wise Hollywoodites. While not stinting a full measure of credit to director Frank Capra, it seems as if the spotlight of recognition ought to play rather strongly on scriptwriter Robert Riskin."

Exhibitors thought the picture was superior. "Excellent picture, wonderful story, and it's clean. A picture for the whole family. Good acting by the whole cast. Everything it takes to make a good picture. Thanks to Columbia for their kind cooperation in putting this picture over." (P. G. Held of Griswold, Iowa) "For clean entertainment, tops everything we ever played. Many said it was the best picture they ever saw. Everyone pleased. It has everything." (Mrs. N. Monte Gill of Montpelier, Vermont) "A natural. Good enough for any type audience from standpoint of cast, acting, recording, photography, and everything. Wish everyone could see this one." (J. W, Gunter of Blackshear, Georgia) "One of those pictures that is so real that the audience lives it. If anybody makes any better pictures than this, we want to buy them. Your people will thank you for playing it, from the Grand Dame who thinks she knows it all to the roughneck in overalls." (Charles Niles, Anamosa, Iowa)

== Contemporary response ==
Channel 4 calls it "wonderfully improbable and charming" and, although "not a bona fide Capra classic," it is "cracking fun all the same."

== Awards and nominations ==
Lady for a Day was nominated for the Academy Award for Best Picture but lost to Cavalcade. May Robson was nominated Best Actress but lost to Katharine Hepburn in Morning Glory, and Robert Riskin lost the Academy Award for Best Adapted Screenplay to Sarah Y. Mason and Victor Heerman for Little Women.

Will Rogers presented the Academy Award for Best Director, and when he opened the envelope he simply announced, "Come up and get it, Frank!" Capra, certain he was the winner, ran to the podium to collect his Oscar, only to discover Rogers had meant Frank Lloyd, who won for Cavalcade, instead. Possibly to downplay Capra's gaffe, Rogers then called third nominee George Cukor to join the two Franks on stage.

== Home media ==
Image Entertainment released the film on Region 1 DVD on October 23, 2001, and on Blu-ray on March 20, 2012. Both editions include commentary by Frank Capra Jr., as well as his brief introduction to the 2001 restoration work. The Blu-ray edition additionally incorporates about four and a half minutes of lost footage, including a key scene where Dave, Blake and McGuire are planning the reception.
