= Riding High (1950 film) =

1950 film by Frank Capra

- Directed by: Frank Capra
- Screenplay by: Robert Riskin; Melville Shavelson (add. dialogue); Jack Rose (add. dialogue)
- Based on: "Strictly Confidential" by Mark Hellinger
- Produced by: Frank Capra
- Starring: Bing Crosby; Coleen Gray
- Cinematography: George Barnes; Ernest Laszlo
- Edited by: William Hornbeck
- Music by: Victor Young
- Production company: Paramount Pictures
- Distributed by: Paramount Pictures
- Release dates: April 9, 1950 (Los Angeles); April 10, 1950 (New York)
- Running time: 112 minutes
- Country: United States
- Language: English
- Budget: $1,920,000
- Box office: $2,350,000 (US rentals)

Riding High is a 1950 American black-and-white musical racetrack film featuring Bing Crosby and directed by Frank Capra. The songs were performed live during filming instead of the customary lip-synching to studio recordings. The film is a remake of an earlier Capra film with screenwriter Robert Riskin titled Broadway Bill (1934). While the film is generally a light musical comedy, its plot contains an unexpected tragic turn.

== Plot ==
Yale graduate Dan Brooks is expected to marry wealthy boss J.L. Higgins' daughter Margaret and join the family box-making business. He is far more interested in racing a horse that he owns named Broadway Bill.

Performing poorly at work, Dan and his groom Whitey leave town to enter Bill in the Imperial Derby, but first must find money for the entry fee. He and old pal Professor Pettigrew try to swindle each other and then must sing the Yale school song when they cannot pay the check at a restaurant.

Maggie's younger sister Alice is secretly in love with Dan, so she offers him some money, pawning her belongings. Whitey is beaten when trying to win money in a craps game, and Broadway Bill is carted away because Dan does not pay his feed bill, and Dan is thrown in jail.

A rich man makes a bet on Bill as a 100-to-1 shot, leading to false rumors that the horse is a sure winner. The odds drop quickly, but gamblers and a crooked jockey try to ensure that their own favorites win the race. Broadway Bill somehow manages to win but collapses at the finish line and suffers a fatal heart attack.

Dan finds comfort in his sadness when he decides to buy and race Broadway Bill II. Dan's enthusiasm persuades Alice and her father to help him.

== Cast ==
- Bing Crosby as Dan Brooks
- Coleen Gray as Alice Higgins
- Charles Bickford as J.L. Higgins
- Frances Gifford as Margaret Higgins
- William Demarest as Happy
- Raymond Walburn as Professor Pettigrew
- James Gleason as Racing Secretary
- Ward Bond as Lee
- Clarence Muse as Whitey
- Percy Kilbride as Pop Jones
- Harry Davenport as Johnson (final film)
- Frankie Darro as Jockey Ted Williams
- Douglass Dumbrille as Eddie Howard
- Joe Frisco as himself
- Irving Bacon as Hamburger man
- Charles Lane as Erickson
- Margaret Hamilton as Edna
- Rand Brooks as Henry Early
- Willard Waterman as Arthur Winslow
- Marjorie Lord as Mary Winslow
- Dub Taylor as Joe
- Paul Harvey as Mr. Whitehall
- Stanley Andrews as Veterinarian (uncredited)
- Oliver Hardy as Gambler at Racetrack (uncredited)

== Production ==
Filming took place from March 9 to May 1949.

The film is a remake of Broadway Bill (1934), and some scenes for both Broadway Bill and Riding High were filmed at the Tanforan Racetrack in San Bruno, California.

== Release ==
Crosby arranged for the world premiere of the film to be held in Front Royal, Virginia on April 1, 1950 as a charity event to raise $6,500 for a new athletic field that was named after him. The event included a long parade, dances and a dedication ceremony at the field that drew more than 20,000 spectators, more than three times the town's population. Crosby was presented with a 16-foot-long key to the city. The premiere showing of the film was attended by luminaries such as Vice President Alben W. Barkley and Virginia's governor and U.S. senators.

== Reception ==
In a contemporary review for The New York Times, critic Bosley Crowther called the film "a stakes winner" and wrote: "Inspiration is something which strikes rarely in Hollywood—and when it does, it is usually tagged 'genius,' out of customary deference to restraint. But whatever you want to call it, it is certainly what hit Frank Capra hard when he thought of recruiting Bing Crosby to play a remake of the oldie, 'Broadway Bill.' And it is surely what stuck with Mr. Capra—and rubbed off on Mr. Crosby, too—all through the redoing of that classic into the current 'Riding High.' For this Capra-Crosby project ... is a genial and jovial entertainment that ties the original."

Critic Edwin Schallert of the Los Angeles Times wrote: "Notwithstanding its somewhat erratic appeal and interest, 'Riding High' is a better picture for its period than was 'Broadway Bill.' That's because it puts the stress on comedy provided by Walburn, Demarest and Muse and because Crosby contributes a solid performance in his role of the vagabond horse owner. Capra can still uniquely contribute the gentle, effective touches to the individual scene."

Variety's review was favorable: "Big yen by the Hollywood film factories recently for remaking past hits is bound to get another hypo when this one gets around. Frank Capra has taken Mark Hellinger’s yarn, Broadway Bill, which he produced and directed for Columbia in 1934, and turned it into one of the best Bing Crosby starrers that’s come along for a considerable time."

Harrison's Reports called the film "as good and even better than the original, for the leading role is a 'natural' for Bing Crosby, whose easy-going style and nonchalant glibness give the picture much of its charm."

== Soundtrack ==
- "A Sure Thing" (Jimmy Van Heusen / Johnny Burke): sung by Bing Crosby
- "Someplace on Anywhere Road" (Jimmy Van Heusen / Johnny Burke): sung by Bing Crosby and Clarence Muse
- "The Whiffenpoof Song": sung by Bing Crosby, Raymond Walburn, William Demarest and group
- "Sunshine Cake" (Jimmy Van Heusen / Johnny Burke): sung by Bing Crosby, Clarence Muse and Coleen Gray
- "The Horse Told Me" (Jimmy Van Heusen / Johnny Burke): sung by Bing Crosby and group
- "Camptown Races": sung by Bing Crosby, Coleen Gray, Clarence Muse and children

Crosby recorded four of the songs for Decca Records. His songs were also included in the Bing's Hollywood series.

== See also ==
- List of American films of 1950
- List of films about horses
- List of films about horse racing
