= The Last Best Year =

1990 American television dramatic film

- Genre: Drama
- Written by: David W. Rintels
- Directed by: John Erman
- Starring: Mary Tyler Moore; Bernadette Peters; Carmen Matthews; Kate Reid; Kenneth Welsh; Erika Alexander; Dorothy McGuire
- Music by: John Morris
- Original language: English

Production
- Executive producer: Victoria Riskin
- Producers: John Erman; Josette Perrotta; David W. Rintels
- Production locations: Toronto; Chicago
- Cinematography: Frank Tidy
- Editor: Paul LaMastra
- Running time: 96 minutes
- Production companies: David W. Rintels Productions; World International Network

Original release
- Network: ABC
- Release: November 4, 1990

The Last Best Year is a 1990 American made-for-television drama film starring Mary Tyler Moore and Bernadette Peters concerning a lonely woman who discovers that she has a terminal illness. It premiered on ABC on November 4, 1990.

== Plot summary ==
Jane (Bernadette Peters) visits a doctor (Brian Bedford) after becoming ill during a business trip. She is told that she has a terminal illness and is referred to a psychologist, Wendy Haller (Mary Tyler Moore), to help her in dealing with the emotional aspects of the illness. Jane, although successful at business, leads a solitary life except for occasional times she spends with her married lover, Jerry, who leaves her during her crisis. Reluctant to open herself emotionally at first, she soon warms to Wendy. Jane makes a last trip to visit her beloved Aunt Lizzie (Carmen Mathews).

Jane finally faces the secret she has been hiding for years, that she gave her infant son up for adoption. As she makes peace with guilt from her troubled past and comes to terms with her fate she gains loving support from Aunt Lizzie, Wendy, and Amy and Peter, her co-workers. She returns to the faith she had turned from and makes contact with her grown son. Wendy, also, has had a troubled past and, through her relationship with Jane, resolves her own issues, especially with her mother Anne.

== Cast ==
- Mary Tyler Moore as Wendy Haller
- Bernadette Peters as Jane Murray
- Brian Bedford as Dr. Castle
- Carmen Mathews as Aunt Lizzie
- Kate Reid as Sister Mary Rose
- Kenneth Welsh as Jerry
- Erika Alexander as Amy
- Dorothy McGuire as Anne
- Lawrence Dane as John Dennis
- Michael Hogan as Billy Haller
- Albert Schultz as Peter Hamm
- Bathsheba Garnett as Mrs. Morton
- Michael J. Reynolds as Wisnovsky

== Production ==
The story in The Last Best Year is based on the experiences of the executive producer, Victoria Riskin, wife of the writer David Rintels. Peters previously worked with the director John Erman on her feature film debut, Ace Eli and Rodger of the Skies, and the television movie, David. Erman suggested Peters for the film.

Riskin said of Moore and Peters "Some people may think Mary Tyler Moore and Bernadette Peters...this movie is going to be a laugh a minute. But they're brilliant dramatic actresses."

== Responses ==
John J. O'Connor wrote in his New York Times review: "What takes place is that rare occurrence in films of any sort-a female bonding...Ms. Moore and Ms. Peters give marvelously restrained and touching performances."
