= The Miracle Woman =

1931 film by Frank Capra

- theatrical release poster
- Directed by: Frank Capra
- Written by: Dorothy Howell (continuity)
- Screenplay by: Jo Swerling
- Based on: Bless You Sister; 1927 play by John Meehan and Robert Riskin
- Produced by: Harry Cohn
- Starring: Barbara Stanwyck
- Cinematography: Joseph Walker
- Edited by: Maurice Wright
- Production company: Columbia Pictures
- Distributed by: Columbia Pictures
- Release date: August 7, 1931 (US)
- Running time: 90 minutes
- Country: United States
- Language: English

The Miracle Woman is a 1931 American pre-Code drama film directed by Frank Capra and starring Barbara Stanwyck, David Manners, and Sam Hardy. Based on the play Bless You Sister by John Meehan and Robert Riskin, the film is about a clergyman's daughter who becomes disillusioned by the mistreatment of her dying father by his church. Having grown cynical about religion, she teams up with a con man and performs fake miracles for profit. The love and trust of a blind veteran, however, restores her faith in God and her fellow man. The Miracle Woman was the second of five film collaborations between Capra and Stanwyck. Produced and distributed by Columbia Pictures, the film was reportedly inspired by the life of Aimee Semple McPherson. It was rejected by the British Board of Film Censors at the time, but was eventually passed with a 12 certificate in 2024.

== Plot ==
"Beware of false prophets which come to you in sheep's clothing....." Mat. VIII,15. "The Miracle Worker" is offered as a rebuke to anyone who, under the cloak of Religion, seeks to sell for gold, God's choicest gift to Humanity _ _ _ _ FAITH.

— Opening captions

Florence Fallon, the daughter of an elderly clergyman, is outraged when the church elders have chosen a younger preacher to replace her father after twenty years of ministry. She angrily states her father has died from a broken heart, and chastises the congregation of what she thinks of their ingratitude and hypocrisy. As the congregation leaves, her bitter, impassioned speech impresses Bob Hornsby, a promoter, who convinces her to use her religious faith so they can squeeze donations out of gullible believers.

Florence, billed as "Sister Fallon", becomes a traveling evangelist for the "Temple of Happiness" and her sermons are broadcast on the radio. John Carson, a blind aviator veteran, contemplates suicide but becomes intrigued with Florence's radio sermon. John and his caretaker Mrs. Higgins attend Florence's crusade, where she preaches from inside a cage of lions. She challenges a congregant to come inside with her as an expression of faith, to which John takes the offer. Afterwards, Hornsby guilts the shills for not answering Florence's calls during the sermon. As Florence prepares to leave for Hornsby's party, John waits outside and takes her to his apartment, where he treats her with music and his ventriloquist dummy. Before she leaves, Florence hires John to write religious hymns.

When Florence arrives at Hornsby's party, their manager Bill Welford threatens to publicly reveal their con unless he receives more money. After Florence finishes a sermon, Hornsby shows a newspaper article reporting that Welford has died from an apparent suicide. He pleads his love for Florence and forcibly kisses her, to which she rejects. Before he leaves, Hornsby takes her house key. Florence returns to John's apartment for a romantic evening and the two kiss.

At Florence's house, Hornsby sneaks in and shows her the newspaper with planted stories, stating Florence is ending her crusade for her health and will travel to Palestine, which is actually a trip to Monte Carlo. Florence demands a retraction, but Hornsby blackmails her, or he will report her for embezzlement and have her held liable for Welford's suicide. Shortly after, as they exchange their goodbyes, Florence tells John the truth but he states he still loves her.

Before Florence is to deliver her farewell sermon, John unsuccessfully tries to convince Florence that he has regained his sight. As Florence leaves to tell the congregation the truth, Hornsby punches John in jealously. When Florence divulges the truth, Hornsby tells a stage hand to shut off the lights. However, this backfires and creates a fire, and the congregation flees in panic. As the building erupts in flames, Florence encourages the congregants to sing. Meanwhile, John is revived and rescues Florence from the fire.

After six months, Hornsby finds Florence is working for the Salvation Army. She receives a telegram from John stating his eyesight could be restored. Florence marches with her faith restored, as Hornsby looks on with contempt.

== Cast ==
- Barbara Stanwyck as Florence Fallon
- David Manners as John Carson
- Sam Hardy as Bob Hornsby
- Beryl Mercer as Mrs. Higgins
- Russell Hopton as Bill Welford
- Charles Middleton as Simpson
- Eddie Boland as Collins
- Thelma Hill as Gussie

== See also ==
- Leap of Faith, a 1992 film with a similar plot
- The Miracle Man, 1919 film starring Lon Chaney, with a plot generally identical to Leap of Faith starring Steve Martin. Only a few minutes of the 1919 film are known to still exist.
