= List of Columbia Pictures films (1940–1949) =

The following is a list of feature films produced and distributed by the American studio Columbia Pictures from 1940 until 1949. During these years Columbia was one of the eight major studios of Hollywood. Production was overseen during the decade by studio head Harry Cohn.

== 1940 ==
Release date	Title	Notes
January 4, 1940	Music in My Heart	
January 5, 1940	The Shadow	Serial film
January 11, 1940	Cafe Hostess	
January 18, 1940	His Girl Friday	distribution only Inducted into the National Film Registry in 1993
January 26, 1940	The Lone Wolf Strikes	
January 31, 1940	Convicted Woman	
February 8, 1940	Five Little Peppers at Home	
February 14, 1940	Pioneers of the Frontier	
February 29, 1940	Blondie on a Budget (Note: Owned by Lionsgate)	distribution only
March 5, 1940	Bullets for Rustlers	
March 7, 1940	The Fight for Life	
March 7, 1940	Outside the Three-Mile Limit	
March 21, 1940	Too Many Husbands	
April 11, 1940	Blazing Six Shooters	
April 12, 1940	Terry and the Pirates	Serial film
April 18, 1940	The Man with Nine Lives	
April 25, 1940	The Doctor Takes a Wife	
April 29, 1940	21 Days Together	
May 2, 1940	The Man from Tumbleweeds	
May 20, 1940	Men Without Souls	
May 20, 1940	Island of Doomed Men	
May 20, 1940	Escape to Glory	
May 23, 1940	Texas Stagecoach	
May 30, 1940	The Lone Wolf Meets a Lady	
June 6, 1940	Passport to Alcatraz	
June 14, 1940	Babies for Sale	
June 26, 1940	Mad Men of Europe	
June 27, 1940	Thunder Over Paris	
June 27, 1940	The Return of Wild Bill	
June 30, 1940	Out West with the Peppers	
July 19, 1940	Deadwood Dick	Serial film
July 24, 1940	I Married Adventure	
July 24, 1940	Girls of the Road	
July 25, 1940	Blondie Has Servant Trouble	distribution only
August 6, 1940	Military Academy	
August 7, 1940	The Lady in Question	
August 15, 1940	The Secret Seven	
August 15, 1940	The Durango Kid	
August 31, 1940	He Stayed for Breakfast	Co-production with B.P. Schulberg Productions
September 1, 1940	Five Little Peppers in Trouble	
September 17, 1940	Before I Hang	
September 19, 1940	The Howards of Virginia	
September 27, 1940	Glamour for Sale	
September 30, 1940	Prairie Schooners	
October 2, 1940	Angels Over Broadway	
October 3, 1940	So You Won't Talk	
October 5, 1940	Fugitive from a Prison Camp	
October 17, 1940	Nobody's Children	
October 21, 1940	West of Abilene	
October 25, 1940	The Green Archer	Serial film
October 31, 1940	Blondie Plays Cupid	distribution only
November 11, 1940	Beyond the Sacramento	
November 15, 1940	Girls Under 21	
November 23, 1940	The Lone Wolf Keeps a Date	
November 30, 1940	Ellery Queen, Master Detective	
December 5, 1940	Thundering Frontier	
December 9, 1940	The Great Plane Robbery	
December 20, 1940	The Phantom Submarine	
December 25, 1940	Arizona	
December 31, 1940	The Wildcat of Tucson	

== 1941 ==
Release date	Title	Notes
January 2, 1941	This Thing Called Love	
January 16, 1941	The Face Behind the Mask	
January 31, 1941	White Eagle	Serial film
February 3, 1941	The Devil Commands	
February 4, 1941	A Voice in the Night	
February 5, 1941	The Pinto Kid	
February 13, 1941	Across the Sierras	
February 20, 1941	Meet Boston Blackie	
February 27, 1941	Outlaws of the Panhandle	
February 27, 1941	Blondie Goes Latin	distribution only
March 6, 1941	The Lone Wolf Takes a Chance	
March 24, 1941	Ellery Queen's Penthouse Mystery	co-production with Larry Darmour Productions
March 27, 1941	Adam Had Four Sons	
March 31, 1941	North from the Lone Star	
April 10, 1941	The Great Swindle	
April 20, 1941	Missing Ten Days	
April 24, 1941	Penny Serenade (Note: Owned by Paramount Pictures (via Melange Pictures))	distribution only
April 24, 1941	Under Age	
April 28, 1941	The Big Boss	
May 7, 1941	The Return of Daniel Boone	
May 8, 1941	Her First Beau	
May 9, 1941	The Spider Returns	Serial film
May 14, 1941	She Knew All the Answers	
May 16, 1941	They Dare Not Love	
May 22, 1941	Neither Blood nor Sand	Mexican film; co-production with Posa Films
May 29, 1941	Adventure in Washington	
June 5, 1941	Time Out for Rhythm	
June 5, 1941	Naval Academy	
June 19, 1941	Hands Across the Rockies	
June 26, 1941	The Medico of Painted Springs	
June 26, 1941	Sweetheart of the Campus	
July 10, 1941	Two in a Taxi	
July 15, 1941	The Son of Davy Crockett	
July 17, 1941	Blondie in Society	distribution only
July 30, 1941	Thunder Over the Prairie	
August 2, 1941	The Richest Man in Town	
August 4, 1941	I Was a Prisoner on Devil's Island	
August 7, 1941	Tillie the Toiler	
August 14, 1941	King of Dodge City	
August 14, 1941	Ellery Queen and the Perfect Crime	
August 15, 1941	The Iron Claw	Serial film
August 20, 1941	Our Wife	
August 21, 1941	Here Comes Mr. Jordan	Nominee for the Academy Award for Best Picture
September 4, 1941	Mystery Ship	
September 9, 1941	Ladies in Retirement	
September 11, 1941	Harmon of Michigan	
September 18, 1941	Prairie Stranger	
September 25, 1941	You'll Never Get Rich	
October 2, 1941	Two Latins from Manhattan	
October 6, 1941	The Stork Pays Off	
October 9, 1941	Texas	
October 12, 1941	The Officer and the Lady	
October 16, 1941	The Blonde from Singapore	
October 16, 1941	Roaring Frontiers	
October 22, 1941	You Belong to Me	
October 23, 1941	Three Girls About Town	
October 23, 1941	The Unknown Policeman	Mexican film; co-production with Posa Films
October 30, 1941	The Men in Her Life	
November 13, 1941	The Royal Mounted Patrol	
November 13, 1941	Secrets of the Lone Wolf	
November 18, 1941	Ellery Queen and the Murder Ring	
November 21, 1941	Holt of the Secret Service	Serial film
November 27, 1941	Go West, Young Lady	
December 4, 1941	Sing for Your Supper	
December 8, 1941	Confessions of Boston Blackie	
December 11, 1941	Honolulu Lu	
December 18, 1941	Riders of the Badlands	
December 18, 1941	Harvard, Here I Come!	
December 25, 1941	Bedtime Story	Co-production with B.P. Schulberg Productions
December 27, 1941	South American George	

== 1942 ==
Release date	Title	Notes
January 1, 1942	The Lone Star Vigilantes	
January 15, 1942	West of Tombstone	
January 15, 1942	Blondie Goes to College	distribution only
January 22, 1942	Cadets on Parade	
January 29, 1942	A Close Call for Ellery Queen	co-production with Larry Darmour Productions
February 5, 1942	The Man Who Returned to Life	
February 12, 1942	Bullets for Bandits	
February 15, 1942	Captain Midnight	Serial film
February 17, 1942	The Lady Is Willing	
February 19, 1942	Shut My Big Mouth	
February 26, 1942	The Adventures of Martin Eden	Co-production with Samuel Bronston Productions and B.P. Schulberg Productions
March 17, 1942	Lawless Plainsmen	
March 19, 1942	Canal Zone	
March 26, 1942	Two Yanks in Trinidad	
April 2, 1942	Tramp, Tramp, Tramp	
April 2, 1942	North of the Rockies	
April 2, 1942	Alias Boston Blackie	
April 9, 1942	Blondie's Blessed Event	distribution only
April 15, 1942	The Invaders	Nominee for the Academy Award for Best Picture
April 23, 1942	Down Rio Grande Way	
April 23, 1942	Hello, Annapolis	
April 28, 1942	The Wife Takes a Flyer	
May 7, 1942	A Desperate Chance for Ellery Queen	
May 14, 1942	The Devil's Trail	
May 14, 1942	Not a Ladies' Man	
May 21, 1942	Meet the Stewarts	
May 21, 1942	Sweetheart of the Fleet	
May 29, 1942	Perils of the Royal Mounted	Serial film
June 4, 1942	Submarine Raider	
June 11, 1942	They All Kissed the Bride	
June 18, 1942	Riders of the Northland	
July 2, 1942	Atlantic Convoy	
July 9, 1942	Flight Lieutenant	Co-production with B.P. Schulberg Productions
July 16, 1942	Prairie Gunsmoke	
July 30, 1942	Enemy Agents Meet Ellery Queen	
August 6, 1942	Blondie for Victory	distribution only
August 6, 1942	Parachute Nurse	
August 13, 1942	Bad Men of the Hills	
August 16, 1942	Vengeance of the West	
August 20, 1942	The Talk of the Town	Nominee of the Academy Award for Best Picture
August 27, 1942	Sabotage Squad	
August 27, 1942	The Three Musketeers	Mexican film; co-production with Posa Films
September 3, 1942	Counter-Espionage	
September 4, 1942	The Secret Code	Serial film
September 17, 1942	A Man's World	
September 24, 1942	My Sister Eileen	
September 25, 1942	Overland to Deadwood	
October 1, 1942	Lucky Legs	
October 8, 1942	Daring Young Man	
October 8, 1942	The Spirit of Stanford	
October 15, 1942	The Lone Prairie	
October 15, 1942	Smith of Minnesota	
October 22, 1942	The Boogie Man Will Get You	
October 29, 1942	Stand By All Networks	
November 2, 1942	Riding Through Nevada	
November 5, 1942	Boston Blackie Goes Hollywood	
November 12, 1942	Laugh Your Blues Away	
November 19, 1942	You Were Never Lovelier	
November 26, 1942	Junior Army	
December 1, 1942	Pardon My Gun	
December 3, 1942	Underground Agent	
December 10, 1942	A Night to Remember	
December 15, 1942	A Tornado in the Saddle	
December 17, 1942	The Valley of Vanishing Men	Serial film
December 30, 1942	Commandos Strike at Dawn	

== 1943 ==
Release date	Title	Notes
January 14, 1943	City Without Men	Co-production with B.P. Schulberg Productions
January 22, 1943	One Dangerous Night	
January 28, 1943	Power of the Press	
February 1, 1943	The Fighting Buckaroo	
February 4, 1943	Reveille with Beverly	
February 11, 1943	No Place for a Lady	
February 15, 1943	Riders of the Northwest Mounted	
February 25, 1943	Something to Shout About	
March 4, 1943	Let's Have Fun	
March 11, 1943	The Circus	Mexican film; co-production with Posa Films
March 18, 1943	After Midnight with Boston Blackie	
April 1, 1943	Murder in Times Square	
April 7, 1943	The More the Merrier	Nominee of the Academy Award for Best Picture
April 15, 1943	She Has What It Takes	
April 27, 1943	Saddles and Sagebrush	
May 6, 1943	Redhead from Manhattan	
May 20, 1943	The Boy from Stalingrad	
May 25, 1943	The Desperadoes	Columbia's first all-Technicolor feature
May 27, 1943	It's a Great Life	distribution only
May 27, 1943	Law of the Northwest	
June 10, 1943	Two Senoritas from Chicago	
June 22, 1943	Crime Doctor	
June 24, 1943	Frontier Fury	
June 29, 1943	Good Luck, Mr. Yates	
July 8, 1943	What's Buzzin', Cousin?	
July 15, 1943	Appointment in Berlin	
July 16, 1943	Batman	Serial film
July 29, 1943	First Comes Courage	
July 29, 1943	Robin Hood of the Range	
August 19, 1943	Destroyer	
August 19, 1943	Passport to Suez	
September 3, 1943	Romeo and Juliet	Mexican film; co-production with Posa Films
September 15, 1943	Hail to the Rangers	
September 23, 1943	Dangerous Blondes	
September 30, 1943	Footlight Glamour	distribution only
October 7, 1943	Doughboys in Ireland	
October 26, 1943	The Chance of a Lifetime	
October 27, 1943	My Kingdom for a Cook	
October 28, 1943	Is Everybody Happy?	
November 4, 1943	Silver City Raiders	
November 11, 1943	Sahara	
November 11, 1943	The Return of the Vampire	
November 30, 1943	There's Something About a Soldier	
December 2, 1943	The Heat's On	
December 9, 1943	The Crime Doctor's Strangest Case	
December 16, 1943	Klondike Kate	
December 23, 1943	Swing Out the Blues	
December 23, 1943	Cowboy in the Clouds	
December 23, 1943	The Vigilantes Ride	
December 24, 1943	The Phantom	Serial film
December 28, 1943	What a Woman!	

== 1944 ==
Release date	Title	Notes
January 18, 1944	The Racket Man	
January 28, 1944	Beautiful But Broke	
February 3, 1944	None Shall Escape	
February 8, 1944	Cowboy Canteen	
February 10, 1944	The Ghost That Walks Alone	
February 17, 1944	Nine Girls	
February 24, 1944	Sailor's Holiday	
March 16, 1944	Two-Man Submarine	
March 23, 1944	Sundown Valley	
March 30, 1944	The Whistler	
April 6, 1944	Hey, Rookie	
April 6, 1944	Cover Girl	
April 13, 1944	Jam Session	
April 20, 1944	Wyoming Hurricane	
April 20, 1944	Girl in the Case	
May 4, 1944	The Black Parachute	
May 18, 1944	Riding West	
May 25, 1944	Stars on Parade	
June 1, 1944	Address Unknown	
June 22, 1944	The Last Horseman	
June 29, 1944	Once Upon a Time	
June 29, 1944	She's a Soldier Too	
July 7, 1944	The Desert Hawk	Serial film
July 13, 1944	Louisiana Hayride	
July 19, 1944	Mr. Winkle Goes to War	
July 25, 1944	U-Boat Prisoner	
July 27, 1944	Shadows in the Night	
July 30, 1944	Secret Command	
July 31, 1944	Swing in the Saddle	
August 17, 1944	Cry of the Werewolf	
August 17, 1944	The Soul of a Monster	
August 18, 1944	Gran Hotel	Mexican film; co-production with Posa Films
August 24, 1944	Kansas City Kitty	
September 10, 1944	The Impatient Years	
September 14, 1944	Ever Since Venus	
September 21, 1944	Cowboy from Lonesome River	
October 5, 1944	Strange Affair	
October 6, 1944	They Live in Fear	
October 9, 1944	The Mark of the Whistler	
October 20, 1944	Black Arrow	Serial film
October 21, 1944	One Mysterious Night	
October 26, 1944	The Unwritten Code	
November 9, 1944	Cyclone Prairie Rangers	
November 9, 1944	Sergeant Mike	
November 16, 1944	The Missing Juror	
December 7, 1944	She's a Sweetheart	
December 14, 1944	Dancing in Manhattan	
December 20, 1944	Carolina Blues	
December 21, 1944	Saddle Leather Law	
December 22, 1944	Together Again	
December 22, 1944	Meet Miss Bobby Socks	
December 28, 1944	Tahiti Nights	

== 1945 ==
Release date	Title	Notes
January 4, 1945	Let's Go Steady	
January 9, 1945	Tonight and Every Night	
January 11, 1945	Youth on Trial	
January 18, 1945	A Song to Remember	
January 23, 1945	Eadie Was a Lady	
January 25, 1945	I Love a Mystery	
January 26, 1945	Brenda Starr, Reporter	Serial film
February 1, 1945	Sagebrush Heroes	
February 8, 1945	Sing Me a Song of Texas	
February 22, 1945	Leave It to Blondie	distribution only
February 27, 1945	The Crime Doctor's Courage	
March 8, 1945	A Guy, a Gal and a Pal	
March 14, 1945	Rough Ridin' Justice	
March 22, 1945	Rough, Tough and Ready	
April 5, 1945	Escape in the Fog	
April 12, 1945	Eve Knew Her Apples	
April 17, 1945	Rockin' in the Rockies	
April 19, 1945	The Power of the Whistler	
April 19, 1945	The Return of the Durango Kid	
April 20, 1945	The Monster and the Ape	Serial film
April 26, 1945	Counter-Attack	
May 10, 1945	Boston Blackie Booked on Suspicion	
May 17, 1945	Both Barrels Blazing	
June 7, 1945	Ten Cents a Dance	
June 21, 1945	Blonde from Brooklyn	
July 5, 1945	Boston Blackie's Rendezvous	
July 20, 1945	A Thousand and One Nights	
July 26, 1945	One Exciting Night	
August 8, 1945	Over 21	Co-production with Sidney Buchman Enterprises
August 8, 1945	The Gay Senorita	
August 16, 1945	Rustlers of the Badlands	
September 6, 1945	The Adventures of Rusty	
September 7, 1945	Rhythm Round-Up	
September 13, 1945	I Love a Bandleader	
September 14, 1945	Jungle Raiders	Serial film
September 18, 1945	Blazing the Western Trail	
September 18, 1945	Outlaws of the Rockies	
September 27, 1945	Crime Doctor's Warning	
September 27, 1945	Song of the Prairie	
October 4, 1945	Kiss and Tell	
October 4, 1945	The True Glory	
October 11, 1945	The Girl of the Limberlost	
October 30, 1945	Voice of the Whistler	
November 8, 1945	My Name Is Julia Ross	
November 15, 1945	Lawless Empire	
November 15, 1945	Prison Ship	
November 22, 1945	Snafu	
November 29, 1945	She Wouldn't Say Yes	
November 29, 1945	Hit the Hay	
November 30, 1945	A Day with the Devil	Mexican film; co-production with Posa Films
December 13, 1945	Who's Guilty?	Serial film
December 13, 1945	Life with Blondie	distribution only
December 20, 1945	Texas Panhandle	
December 25, 1945	Pardon My Past	
December 27, 1945	Out of the Depths	

== 1946 ==
Release date	Title	Notes
January 4, 1946	The Fighting Guardsman	
January 9, 1946	One Way to Love	
January 10, 1946	Tars and Spars	
January 24, 1946	A Close Call for Boston Blackie	
January 26, 1946	Meet Me on Broadway	
January 31, 1946	Frontier Gunlaw	
February 14, 1946	The Notorious Lone Wolf	
February 14, 1946	Roaring Rangers	
February 21, 1946	The Bandit of Sherwood Forest	
February 28, 1946	The Gentleman Misbehaves	
March 7, 1946	Just Before Dawn	
March 14, 1946	Throw a Saddle on a Star	
March 21, 1946	Perilous Holiday	Co-production with Phil L. Ryan Productions
March 28, 1946	Talk About a Lady	
March 28, 1946	Hop Harrigan	Distribution only; Serial film
March 28, 1946	Gunning for Vengeance	
March 29, 1946	Night Editor	
April 4, 1946	Blondie's Lucky Day	distribution only
April 19, 1946	Mysterious Intruder	
April 25, 1946	Galloping Thunder	
April 25, 1946	Gilda	Inducted into the National Film Registry in 2013
May 2, 1946	The Phantom Thief	
May 16, 1946	That Texas Jamboree	
May 23, 1946	The Devil's Mask	
May 30, 1946	The Man Who Dared	
May 30, 1946	Two-Fisted Stranger	
June 7, 1946	The Walls Came Tumbling Down	
June 13, 1946	Renegades	
June 20, 1946	Dangerous Business	
June 27, 1946	The Return of Rusty	
July 4, 1946	The Unknown	
July 11, 1946	Chick Carter, Detective	Serial film
July 11, 1946	The Desert Horseman	
July 18, 1946	Cowboy Blues	
July 25, 1946	Sing While You Dance	
August 8, 1946	Personality Kid	
August 15, 1946	Heading West	
September 2, 1946	Singing on the Trail	
September 6, 1946	The Thrill of Brazil	
September 12, 1946	It's Great to Be Young	
September 24, 1946	Gallant Journey	
September 26, 1946	Shadowed	
October 10, 1946	The Jolson Story	
October 10, 1946	So Dark the Night	
October 17, 1946	Blondie Knows Best	distribution only
October 24, 1946	Son of the Guardsman	Serial film
October 24, 1946	Crime Doctor's Man Hunt	
November 7, 1946	The Secret of the Whistler	
November 18, 1946	Landrush	
November 21, 1946	Terror Trail	
November 28, 1946	Betty Co-Ed	
December 10, 1946	The Fighting Frontiersman	
December 12, 1946	Boston Blackie and the Law	
December 12, 1946	Lone Star Moonlight	
December 19, 1946	The Return of Monte Cristo	Co-production with Edward Small Productions
December 24, 1946	Alias Mr. Twilight	
December 25, 1946	I Am a Fugitive	Mexican film; co-production with Posa Films
December 26, 1946	Singin' in the Corn	

== 1947 ==
Release date	Title	Notes
January 9, 1947	Blondie's Big Moment	distribution only; co-production with King Features Syndicate
January 15, 1947	Dead Reckoning	
January 16, 1947	The Lone Wolf in Mexico	
January 21, 1947	Johnny O'Clock	co-production with J.E.M. Productions
January 30, 1947	South of the Chisholm Trail	
February 6, 1947	The Thirteenth Hour	
February 6, 1947	Blind Spot	
February 6, 1947	Jack Armstrong	Serial film
February 13, 1947	Cigarette Girl	
February 13, 1947	Over the Santa Fe Trail	
February 20, 1947	Mr. District Attorney	
March 6, 1947	The Guilt of Janet Ames	
March 6, 1947	The Lone Hand Texan	
March 20, 1947	Millie's Daughter	
March 27, 1947	West of Dodge City	
March 29, 1947	King of the Wild Horses	
April 10, 1947	Blondie's Holiday	distribution only
April 24, 1947	Law of the Canyon	
May 1, 1947	For the Love of Rusty	
May 15, 1947	Bulldog Drummond at Bay	
May 22, 1947	The Vigilante	Distribution only; Serial film
May 25, 1947	Framed	
May 29, 1947	The Millerson Case	
May 29, 1947	Prairie Raiders	
June 2, 1947	The Corpse Came C.O.D.	
June 19, 1947	Little Miss Broadway	
June 26, 1947	Sport of Kings	
June 26, 1947	Swing the Western Way	
July 3, 1947	The Stranger from Ponca City	
July 10, 1947	Keeper of the Bees	
July 15, 1947	Gunfighters	co-production with Producer-Actors Corporation
August 1, 1947	Last of the Redmen	
August 7, 1947	The Son of Rusty	
August 14, 1947	Riders of the Lone Star	
August 21, 1947	Down to Earth	
August 21, 1947	Smoky River Serenade	
September 4, 1947	Bulldog Drummond Strikes Back	
September 4, 1947	The Sea Hound	Serial film
September 25, 1947	When a Girl's Beautiful	
October 9, 1947	Key Witness	
October 14, 1947	Buckaroo from Powder River	
October 16, 1947	Blondie in the Dough	distribution only
October 23, 1947	Sweet Genevieve	
November 5, 1947	Two Blondes and a Redhead	
November 5, 1947	The Last Round-Up	distribution only; produced by Gene Autry Productions
November 12, 1947	Her Husband's Affairs	Co-production with Cornell Pictures
November 13, 1947	The Lone Wolf in London	
November 20, 1947	Last Days of Boot Hill	
November 25, 1947	Pacific Adventure	US release of Australian Smithy
November 27, 1947	The Crime Doctor's Gamble	
December 11, 1947	Devil Ship	
December 18, 1947	Brick Bradford	Serial film
December 18, 1947	Blondie's Anniversary	distribution only
December 25, 1947	Fly Away, Young Man!	Mexican Film; co-production with Posa Films
December 25, 1947	Rose of Santa Rosa	
December 1947	It Had to Be You	

== 1948 ==
Release date	Title	Notes
January 2, 1948	The Swordsman	
January 9, 1948	Six-Gun Law	
January 15, 1948	I Love Trouble	Co-production with Cornell Pictures
January 16, 1948	Glamour Girl	
January 17, 1948	The Prince of Thieves	
January 23, 1948	Mary Lou	Co-production with Sam Katzman Productions
February 5, 1948	The Wreck of the Hesperus	
February 12, 1948	The Woman from Tangier	
February 19, 1948	Phantom Valley	
February 20, 1948	Relentless	Co-production with Cavalier Productions
February 27, 1948	To the Ends of the Earth	Co-production with Kennedy-Buckman Pictures
March 3, 1948	The Sign of the Ram	Co-production with Signet Productions
March 8, 1948	The Mating of Millie	
March 18, 1948	The Return of the Whistler	
March 20, 1948	Song of Idaho	
March 25, 1948	Adventures in Silverado	
March 25, 1948	West of Sonora	
March 29, 1948	The Lost One	Italian production. Distribution.
April 1, 1948	Tex Granger	Serial film
April 8, 1948	My Dog Rusty	
April 14, 1948	The Lady from Shanghai	co-production with Mercury Productions Inducted into the National Film Registry in 2018
April 15, 1948	Port Said	
May 6, 1948	Best Man Wins	
May 13, 1948	Trapped by Boston Blackie	
May 13, 1948	Whirlwind Raiders	
June 3, 1948	Blondie's Reward	distribution only
June 30, 1948	The Black Arrow	co-production with Edward Small Productions
June 1948	The Fuller Brush Man	co-production with Edward Small Productions
July 1, 1948	Coroner Creek	co-production with Producer-Actors Corporation
July 1, 1948	Blazing Across the Pecos	
July 8, 1948	Thunderhoof	
July 15, 1948	Superman (Note: Owned by Warner Bros.)	Distribution only; Serial film
July 29, 1948	The Arkansas Swing	
August 1, 1948	The Strawberry Roan	distribution only; produced by Gene Autry Productions
August 12, 1948	Trail to Laredo	
August 15, 1948	Lulu Belle	distribution only; produced by Benedict Bogeaus
August 23, 1948	The Loves of Carmen	Co-production with The Beckworth Corporation
September 2, 1948	Walk a Crooked Mile	Co-production with Edward Small Productions
September 4, 1948	The Genius	Mexican film; co-production with Posa Films
September 9, 1948	The Gentleman from Nowhere	
September 16, 1948	Black Eagle	
September 23, 1948	Singin' Spurs	
September 30, 1948	Triple Threat	
October 7, 1948	I Surrender Dear	
October 13, 1948	The Gallant Blade	
October 14, 1948	El Dorado Pass	
October 21, 1948	The Untamed Breed	Co-production with Sage Western Pictures Inc.
October 21, 1948	Rusty Leads the Way	
October 26, 1948	The Return of October	
October 28, 1948	Congo Bill	Distribution only; Serial film
November 11, 1948	Leather Gloves	
November 18, 1948	Racing Luck	
December 2, 1948	Quick on the Trigger	
December 15, 1948	Jungle Jim	
December 15, 1948	Loaded Pistols	distribution only; produced by Gene Autry Productions
December 16, 1948	Smoky Mountain Melody	
December 22, 1948	The Dark Past	
December 23, 1948	Blondie's Secret	distribution only
December 1948	The Man from Colorado	

== 1949 ==
Release date	Title	Notes
January 20, 1949	Shockproof	
February 2, 1949	Slightly French	
February 3, 1949	Rusty Saves a Life	
February 3, 1949	Challenge of the Range	
February 10, 1949	Bruce Gentry	Serial film
February 10, 1949	Ladies of the Chorus	
February 17, 1949	Affairs of a Rogue	Released as a British film under the title The First Gentleman
February 28, 1949	Song of India	
March 2, 1949	Boston Blackie's Chinese Venture	
March 5, 1949	The Walking Hills	Co-production with Producer-Actors Corporation
March 10, 1949	Blondie's Big Deal	distribution only
March 15, 1949	The Crime Doctor's Diary	
March 16, 1949	Riders of the Whistling Pines	distribution only; produced by Gene Autry Productions
March 17, 1949	Manhattan Angel	
March 17, 1949	Knock on Any Door	Co-production with Santana Pictures Corporation
April 1, 1949	Make Believe Ballroom	
April 9, 1949	Desert Vigilante	
April 15, 1949	Home in San Antone	
April 19, 1949	The Big Sombrero	distribution only; produced by Gene Autry Productions
April 20, 1949	The Undercover Man	
April 26, 1949	The Mutineers	
April 27, 1949	We Were Strangers	Co-production with Horizon Pictures
May 3, 1949	The Lost Tribe	
May 4, 1949	The Magician	Mexican film; co-production with Posa Films
May 19, 1949	Laramie	
May 26, 1949	Batman and Robin	Serial film
May 26, 1949	Johnny Allegro	
May 27, 1949	The Doolins of Oklahoma	Co-production with Producer-Actors Corporation
June 5, 1949	The Blazing Trail	
June 10, 1949	Lust for Gold	
June 30, 1949	The Secret of St. Ives	
July 11, 1949	Anna Lucasta	Co-production with Security Pictures
July 14, 1949	Kazan	
July 21, 1949	Law of the Barbary Coast	
August 1, 1949	Mr. Soft Touch	
August 8, 1949	South of Death Valley	
August 11, 1949	The Lone Wolf and His Lady	
August 17, 1949	Jolson Sings Again	Co-production with Sidney Buchman Enterprises
August 25, 1949	Air Hostess	
August 30, 1949	Rim of the Canyon	distribution only; produced by Gene Autry Productions
September 8, 1949	Blondie Hits the Jackpot	distribution only
September 15, 1949	The Devil's Henchman	
September 15, 1949	The Cowboy and the Indians	distribution only; produced by Gene Autry Productions
September 20, 1949	Miss Grant Takes Richmond	
October 1, 1949	Holiday in Havana	
October 20, 1949	Prison Warden	
October 20, 1949	Bandits of El Dorado	
October 30, 1949	29 Acacia Avenue	Released as a British film
November 1, 1949	Feudin' Rhythm	
November 3, 1949	Rusty's Birthday	
November 10, 1949	Barbary Pirate	
November 17, 1949	Chinatown at Midnight	
November 18, 1949	Tell It to the Judge	
November 22, 1949	Horsemen of the Sierras	
November 24, 1949	Renegades of the Sage	
November 29, 1949	Riders in the Sky	distribution only; produced by Gene Autry Productions
November 1949	Tokyo Joe	co-production with Santana Pictures Corporation
December 2, 1949	And Baby Makes Three	co-production with Santana Pictures Corporation
December 8, 1949	Bodyhold	
December 20, 1949	Sons of New Mexico	distribution only; produced by Gene Autry Productions
December 22, 1949	Adventures of Sir Galahad	Serial film
December 29, 1949	The Reckless Moment	Co-production with Walter Wanger Productions

== See also ==
- List of Columbia Pictures films

== Bibliography ==
- Blottner, Gene. Columbia Pictures Movie Series, 1926–1955: The Harry Cohn Years. McFarland, 2011.
- Christensen, Jens. Global Experience Industries. ISD LLC, 2009.
- Dick, Bernard F. The Merchant Prince of Poverty Row: Harry Cohn of Columbia Pictures. University Press of Kentucky, 2014.
