= Robert B. Williams (actor) =

American actor (1904–1978)

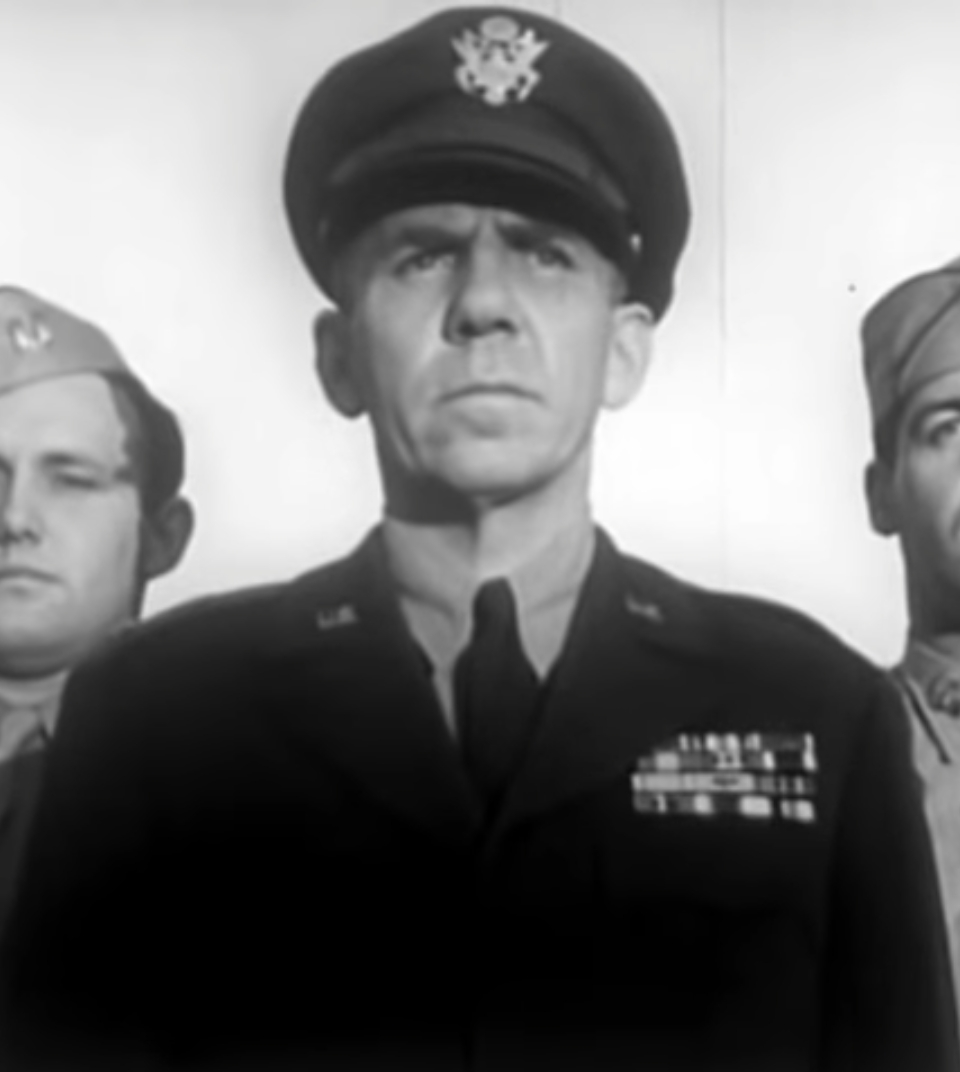
- Williams in The Lady Says No (1952)
- Born: September 23, 1904; Glencoe, Illinois, U.S.
- Died: June 17, 1978 (aged 73); Orange County, California, U.S.
- Occupation: Actor
- Years active: 1935–1977

Robert B. Williams (September 23, 1904 – June 17, 1978) was an American character actor from the 1930s through the 1970s. During his 37-year career, he appeared in over 150 feature films, as well as numerous film shorts, television films, and television shows. He did not break into the film business until he was in his 30s.

== Career ==
Williams starred as labor organizer Kirk McClure in the 1935 Broadway production of Let Freedom Ring. His first big screen appearance was in the film short Mixed Policies in 1936. After several roles as an extra in films, he made his feature debut in a small role in the 1941 film How Green Was My Valley, starring Walter Pidgeon and Maureen O'Hara. During the 1940s he appeared in some notable films in small supporting roles, including the 1947 film noir, Lady in the Lake, starring Robert Montgomery; Henry Hathaway's Call Northside 777 (1948), starring James Stewart, Richard Conte, and Lee J. Cobb; It Happens Every Spring (1949), starring Ray Milland, Jean Peters, and Paul Douglas; and the classic musical On the Town (1949), starring Gene Kelly, Frank Sinatra, Betty Garrett, Ann Miller, Jules Munshin, and Vera-Ellen.

In the 1950s, he appeared in over 80 films, including such notable pictures as: Father's Little Dividend (1951), the sequel to the 1950 hit, Father of the Bride, starring Spencer Tracy, Elizabeth Taylor, and Joan Bennett; Magnificent Obsession (1954), starring Rock Hudson and Jane Wyman; 1952's Singin' in the Rain, starring Gene Kelly, Donald O'Connor, and Debbie Reynolds; the classic teenage drama, Rebel Without a Cause (1955), starring James Dean and Natalie Wood; the biopic The Spirit of St. Louis, starring James Stewart; Desire Under the Elms (1958), based on the Eugene O'Neill play of the same name, starring Sophia Loren, Anthony Perkins, and Burl Ives; the war classic, Pork Chop Hill, starring Gregory Peck; the Alfred Hitchcock classic, North by Northwest (1959), starring Cary Grant, Eva Marie Saint, and James Mason; and the 1959 romantic comedy, Pillow Talk, directed by Michael Gordon, and starring Rock Hudson and Doris Day. Williams began to appear on the small screen in the 1950s as well, with his first performance on an episode of the short-lived series Dangerous Assignment. He continued to make guest appearances on numerous television shows throughout the decade, including Perry Mason, The Millionaire, The Adventures of Ozzie & Harriet, and The Lone Ranger.

In the 1960s, Williams focused more on the small screen, appearing in only nine films during the decade, including: Cimarron (1960), starring Glenn Ford, Maria Schell, and Anne Baxter; Sunrise at Campobello (1960), starring Greer Garson and Ralph Bellamy; and Hang 'Em High (1968), starring Clint Eastwood. His small screen activity included guest shots on such television shows as Dr. Kildare, Rawhide, The Big Valley, The Wild Wild West, Lassie, Mr Dorfman the mailman,Mission Impossible, Bonanza, The Andy Griffith Show, Gunsmoke; Williams had small recurring roles in The New Phil Silvers Show and Hazel.

In 1963, Williams appeared uncredited as a Cattle Buyer on The Virginian in the episode "Run Away Home." In 1969 Williams appeared as the Freight Agent on the TV Series The Virginian in the episode titled "Journey to Scathelock." In that episode his name credit was shown as Robert Williams.

In the 1970s, he appeared in two films; his final big screen appearance was in Brian De Palma's 1972 comedy Get to Know Your Rabbit. His television work included guest shots on shows such as The Partridge Family, The Streets of San Francisco, The Rockford Files, Police Woman, and Marcus Welby, M.D.. His final acting job was in the recurring role of Barth Gimble, Sr. in Norman Lear's talk show parody Fernwood Tonight starring Martin Mull in 1977. Williams died on June 17, 1978, and was buried in Holy Cross Cemetery in Culver City, California.

== Filmography ==
(Per AFI database)

- How Green Was My Valley (1941) (uncredited)
- Appointment in Berlin (1943)
- What a Woman! (1943)
- Janie (1944)
- Jam Session (1944)
- Girl in the Case (1944)
- The Ghost That Walks Alone (1944)
- Cry of the Werewolf (1944)
- Carolina Blues (1944)
- Mr. Winkle Goes to War (1944)
- Once Upon a Time (1944)
- One Mysterious Night (1944)
- The Racket Man (1944)
- Stars on Parade (1944)
- Two-Man Submarine (1944)
- U-Boat Prisoner (1944)
- Beautiful But Broke (1944)
- Sergeant Mike (1944)
- Adventures of Rusty (1945)
- Blazing the Western Trail (1945)
- Boston Blackie Booked on Suspicion (1945)
- Boston Blackie's Rendezvous (1945)
- Escape in the Fog (1945)
- Eve Knew Her Apples (1945)
- I Love a Bandleader (1945)
- Over 21 (1945)
- Prison Ship (1945)
- Rough, Tough and Ready (1945)
- Song of the Prairie (1945)
- Tonight and Every Night (1945)
- Youth on Trial (1945)
- Out of the Depths (1945)
- Snafu (1945)
- The Bandit of Sherwood Forest (1946)
- Black Angel (1946)
- Gunning for Vengeance (1946)
- Meet Me on Broadway (1946)
- Roaring Rangers (1946)
- The Show-Off (1946)
- Lady in the Lake (1947)
- Key Witness (1947)
- Mr. District Attorney (1947)
- The 13th Hour (1947)
- Variety Girl (1947)
- Unexpected Guest (1947)
- Apartment for Peggy (1948)
- The Street with No Name (1948)
- Strange Gamble (1948)
- Cass Timberlane (1948)
- He Walked by Night (1948)
- King of the Gamblers (1948)
- Raw Deal (1948)
- The Snake Pit (1948)
- T-Men (1948)
- Call Northside 777 (1948)
- Any Number Can Play (1949)
- Law of the Barbary Coast (1949)
- Special Agent (1949)
- Big Jack (1949)
- The Dark Past (1949)
- Home in San Antone (1949)
- It Happens Every Spring (1949)
- The Lone Wolf and His Lady (1949)
- The Mysterious Desperado (1949)
- Oh, You Beautiful Doll (1949)
- On the Town (1949)
- Roughshod (1949)
- Rusty's Birthday (1949)
- Slightly French (1949)
- Stagecoach Kid (1949)
- Mary Ryan, Detective (1950)
- Beauty on Parade (1950)
- The Good Humor Man (1950)
- He's a Cockeyed Wonder (1950)
- Military Academy with That 10th Avenue Gang (1950)
- Mister 880 (1950)
- The Outriders (1950)
- Where the Sidewalk Ends (1950)
- Malaya (1950)
- The Lawless (1950)
- Love That Brute (1950)
- Pioneer Marshal (1950)
- Close to My Heart (1951)
- Fort Worth (1951)
- My True Story (1951)
- Smuggler's Gold (1951)
- The Unknown Man (1951)
- Storm Warning (1951)
- The Family Secret (1951)
- Father's Little Dividend (1951) as Traffic Cop at Hospital (uncredited)
- The Groom Wore Spurs (1951)
- The Guy Who Came Back (1951)
- The Sellout (1952)
- Dreamboat (1952)
- The Pride of St. Louis (1952)
- Singin' in the Rain (1952) as Policeman (uncredited)
- The Sniper (1952)
- The Lady Says No (1952)
- Loan Shark (1952)
- White Goddess (1953)
- Let's Do It Again (1953)
- The Farmer Takes a Wife (1953)
- I Love Melvin (1953)
- Mister Scoutmaster (1953)
- The President's Lady (1953)
- Take the High Ground! (1953)
- The Nebraskan (1953)
- Hell and High Water (1954)
- Magnificent Obsession (1954)
- Playgirl (1954)
- Massacre Canyon (1954)
- Cell 2455, Death Row (1955)
- The Eternal Sea (1955)
- I Died a Thousand Times (1955)
- I'll Cry Tomorrow (1955)
- Rebel Without a Cause (1955) as Ed, Moose's Father (uncredited)
- Revenge of the Creature (1955)
- Running Wild (1955)
- Three for the Show (1955)
- Apache Ambush (1955)
- The Court-Martial of Billy Mitchell (1955)
- Hit the Deck (1955)
- Lucy Gallant (1955)
- The Killing (1956)
- The Unguarded Moment (1956)
- The Lone Ranger (1956)
- The Big Land (1957)
- Death in Small Doses (1957)
- The Hard Man (1957)
- The Iron Sheriff (1957)
- Man on Fire (1957)
- The Phantom Stagecoach (1957)
- The Spirit of St. Louis (1957)
- Bombers B-52 (1957)
- Desire Under the Elms (1958)
- Hell Squad (1958)
- Party Girl (1958)
- Violent Road (1958)
- The Bat (1959)
- North by Northwest (1959) as Patrolman Waggoner (uncredited)
- Pillow Talk (1959)
- Teenagers from Outer Space (1959)
- Pork Chop Hill (1959)
- Sunrise at Campobello (1960)
- Cimarron (1960)
- Everything's Ducky (1961)
- Pepe (1961)
- Saintly Sinners (1962)
- Apache Rifles (1964)
- Satan's Bed (1965)
- Follow Me, Boys! (1966)
- Hang 'Em High (1968) as Elwood
- Evel Knievel (1971)
- Get to Know Your Rabbit (1972)

== Television ==
Year	Title	Role	Notes
1961	Rawhide	Blunt	S3:E17, "Incident of the New Start"
1969	The Virginian	Freight agent	S8:E12, "Journey to Scathelock"
