= Charles Wagenheim =

American actor

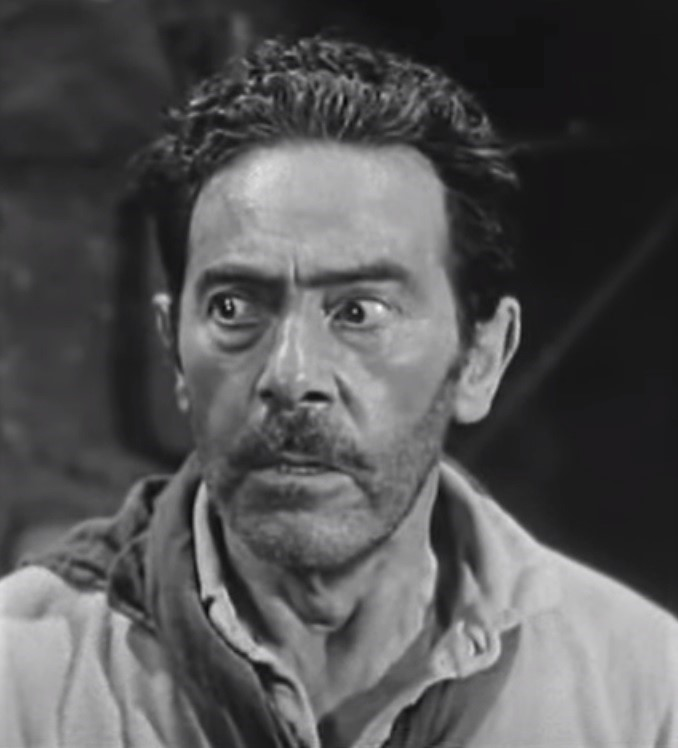
- Wagenheim in the TV-series The Adventures of Jim Bowie, episode Ghost of Jean Battoo (1956)
- Born: Charles Wagenheim; February 21, 1896; Newark, New Jersey, U.S.
- Died: March 6, 1979 (aged 83); Los Angeles, California, U.S.
- Occupation: Actor
- Years active: 1929–1979

Charles Wagenheim (February 21, 1896 – March 6, 1979) was an American actor who appeared in over 250 films.

== Biography ==
Charles Wagenheim was born in Newark, New Jersey, on February 21, 1896. On the small screen he played, among others, the role of Halligan in 29 episodes of the television series Gunsmoke from 1966 to 1975 and numerous other secondary characters or guest star roles in many episodes of television series from the fifties to the late seventies. His cinema career consists of various participations; he took part in particular in many films of the western genre between the 1930s and 1950s. He also appeared in 1966 as Halligan in season 12 episode 2 and episode 5 on the TV western series Gunsmoke.

He was credited for the last time on television screens in an episode of All In the Family, "The Return of Stephanie's Father", broadcast on 25 March 1979; he plays the role of a bum. As regards his film curriculum, his last performance dates back to the 1976 film Missouri.

== Death ==
Wagenheim was killed in Hollywood on March 6, 1979, aged 83, by his wife's nurse, after he found out that the nurse had forged checks in his name and confronted her. The nurse pleaded guilty to voluntary manslaughter and was sentenced to eight years of prison.

== Filmography ==
Year	Title	Role	Notes
1929	The Trial of Mary Dugan	Court Stenographer	Uncredited
1929	Gentlemen of the Press	Copy Boy	Uncredited
1931	The Smiling Lieutenant	Arresting Officer	Uncredited
1938	Jezebel	Customer	Uncredited
1940	Two Girls on Broadway	Bartell's Assistant	
1940	Andy Hardy Meets Debutante	Waiter	Uncredited
1940	Sporting Blood	Man at Race Track	Uncredited
1940	I Love You Again	Malavinksy, Fingerprint Man	Uncredited
1940	Foreign Correspondent	Assassin	
1940	He Stayed for Breakfast	Timid Waiter	Uncredited
1940	Charlie Chan at the Wax Museum	Willie Fern	
1940	Sky Murder	Ricoro, Flight Attendant	Uncredited
1940	Dark Streets of Cairo	Dumiel, Captive Jeweller	Uncredited
1941	Meet Boston Blackie	Runt	
1941	The Penalty	Taxi Driver	Uncredited
1941	They Dare Not Love	Valet	Uncredited
1941	The Get-Away	Hutch	
1941	Paris Calling	French Waiter	Uncredited
1941	Babes on Broadway	Reed's Composer	Uncredited
1942	Mississippi Gambler	Collins	Uncredited
1942	Fingers at the Window	Fred Bixley	
1942	The Mystery of Marie Roget	Subordinate to Prefect	Uncredited
1942	Blondie for Victory	Sugar Hoarder	Uncredited
1942	Halfway to Shanghai	Jonathan Peale	
1942	Sin Town	Dry-Hole	
1942	Daring Young Man	Fritz	Uncredited
1942	Dr. Renault's Secret	Jacques	Uncredited
1943	Don Winslow of the Coast Guard	Mussanti	
1943	I Escaped from the Gestapo	Hart	
1943	Appointment in Berlin	Julius Hoffman, Florist	Uncredited
1943	Frontier Badmen	Melvin	Uncredited
1943	Calling Dr. Death	Coroner	
1943	The Song of Bernadette	Jacques Rousseau, Carpenter	Uncredited
1944	Ali Baba and the Forty Thieves	Barber	Uncredited
1944	The Whistler	Man at Flophouse	Uncredited
1944	The Black Parachute	Kurt VanDan	Uncredited
1944	Summer Storm		Uncredited
1944	Raiders of Ghost City	Hugo Metzger	Serial, [Chs. 8-9]
1944	An American Romance	Shoe Salesman	Uncredited
1944	Storm Over Lisbon	Frustrated Man	Uncredited
1944	Sergeant Mike	Hall	Uncredited
1945	The House of Frankenstein	Jailer	Uncredited
1945	A Song to Remember	Waiter	Uncredited
1945	Strange Illusion	Tom, Armstrong's Assistant	Uncredited
1945	Salome, Where She Danced	Telegrapher	Uncredited
1945	Counter-Attack	Tashkin	Uncredited
1945	Boston Blackie Booked on Suspicion	Mr. Sobel	Uncredited
1945	The Scarlet Clue	Rausch	Uncredited
1945	Dangerous Partners	Little Man at Lunch Counter	Uncredited
1945	Captain Eddie	Workman	Uncredited
1945	Jungle Captive	Fred	
1945	Within These Walls	Convict Joseph Ciesak	Uncredited
1945	Easy to Look At	Louie	Uncredited
1945	The House on 92nd Street	Gustav Hausmann	
1946	Whistle Stop	Deputy	Uncredited
1946	Colonel Effingham's Raid	Man at Town Meeting	Uncredited
1946	The Spiral Staircase	Desk Clerk	Uncredited
1946	From This Day Forward	Hoffman	Uncredited
1946	Tangier	Hadji	Uncredited
1946	Night Editor	Phillips	Uncredited
1946	House of Horrors	Walter, Printer	Uncredited
1946	The Hoodlum Saint	Mr. Cohn	Uncredited
1946	The Dark Corner	The Real Fred Foss	Uncredited
1946	The Brute Man	Pawnbroker	Uncredited
1947	Lighthouse	Quimby, Insurance Adjustor	
1947	Time Out of Mind	Jim	Uncredited
1947	Monsieur Verdoux	Bank Manager's Friend	Uncredited
1947	The Corpse Came C.O.D.	Claude	Uncredited
1947	Merton of the Movies	Employment Man	Uncredited
1947	Pirates of Monterey	Juan	
1948	Alias a Gentleman	Con	Uncredited
1948	The Man from Texas	Arthur, Bank Teller	Uncredited
1948	Scudda Hoo! Scudda Hay!	Joe the Barber	Uncredited
1948	The Miracle of the Bells	Mr. Kummer	Uncredited
1948	River Lady	Man	Uncredited
1948	Man-Eater of Kumaon	Panwah's Father	
1948	Bodyguard	Dr. Briller, Optometrist	Uncredited
1948	Cry of the City	Counterman	Uncredited
1948	The Gallant Blade	Minor Role	Uncredited
1948	Joan of Arc	Calot	Uncredited
1949	Boston Blackie's Chinese Venture	Runt	
1949	A Woman's Secret	Algerian Piano Player	Uncredited
1949	Criss Cross	Waiter	Uncredited
1949	Siren of Atlantis	Doctor	
1949	I Cheated the Law	Al Markham	
1949	The Set-Up	Hamburger Man	Uncredited
1949	The Great Sinner	Gambler with Ring	Uncredited
1949	Scene of the Crime	Nervous Witness	Uncredited
1949	Samson and Delilah	Townsman	Uncredited
1950	Key to the City	Drunk	Uncredited
1950	The Yellow Cab Man	Drunk	Uncredited
1950	The Reformer and the Redhead	Zoo Attendant	Uncredited
1950	Motor Patrol	Bud Haynes	
1950	Mystery Street	Baggage Clerk	Uncredited
1950	Three Little Words	Johnny the Waiter	Uncredited
1950	A Lady Without Passport	Ramon Santez	
1950	Three Secrets		Uncredited
1950	Dial 1119	Man on Street	Uncredited
1950	The Goldbergs	Painter	Uncredited
1950	Double Deal	Bus Driver	Uncredited
1951	The Company She Keeps	Pete	Uncredited
1951	Three Guys Named Mike	Irate Plane Passenger	Uncredited
1951	Inside Straight	Tomson's Secretary	Uncredited
1951	Pier 23	Lefty	
1951	The House on Telegraph Hill	Man At Accident	
1951	Mask of the Avenger	Townsman	Uncredited
1951	The Tall Target	Telegraph Clerk	Uncredited
1951	Jim Thorpe – All-American	Briggs	Uncredited
1951	A Streetcar Named Desire	Passerby	Uncredited
1951	Street Bandits	Gus Betts, slot machine maker	
1951	The Big Night	Barfly	Uncredited
1952	Aladdin and His Lamp	Old Arab	Uncredited
1952	The Captive City	Phone Man	Uncredited
1952	The Sniper	Mr. Alpine	Uncredited
1952	Lure of the Wilderness	Townsman	Uncredited
1952	The Story of Will Rogers	Sam	Uncredited
1952	The Miracle of Our Lady of Fatima	Villager	Uncredited
1952	Something for the Birds	Cab Driver	Uncredited
1953	Tangier Incident		Uncredited
1953	Salome	Simon	Uncredited
1953	The Girl Next Door	Junkman	Uncredited
1953	Loose in London	Pierre du Manique	Uncredited
1953	Vicki	Seedy Movie House Patron	Uncredited
1953	The Veils of Bagdad	Bedouin Spy	
1953	Beneath the 12-Mile Reef	Paul	Uncredited
1954	Executive Suite	Luigi Cassoni	Uncredited
1954	The Boy from Oklahoma	Hymie, The Timekeeper	Uncredited
1954	Princess of the Nile	Babu's Friend	Uncredited
1954	Suddenly	Iz Kaplan	Uncredited
1954	Bengal Brigade	Headman	Uncredited
1954	Sign of the Pagan	Palace Messenger	Uncredited
1954	Day of Triumph	Lazarus	Uncredited
1955	The Prodigal	Zubeir	
1955	Canyon Crossroads	Pete Barnwell	
1955	The Sea Chase	American Reporter	Uncredited
1955	Kismet	Beggar	Uncredited
1956	The Killer Is Loose	Clothing Store Owner	Uncredited
1956	Blackjack Ketchum, Desperado	Jerry Carson	Uncredited
1957	This Could Be the Night	Mike, Bartender	Uncredited
1957	The Book of Acts Series	Crippled Man at the Temple	
1958	Toughest Gun in Tombstone	Pete Beasley	
1958	Colgate Theatre	Janitor	Season 1 Episode 1: "Adventures of a Model"
1958	The Tunnel of Love	Day Motel Man	
1958	The Power of the Resurrection	Merchant	
1958	Lonelyhearts	Joe	
1959	Alfred Hitchcock Presents	Henlein	Season 5 Episode 12: "Specialty of the House"
1959	The Diary of Anne Frank	Sneak Thief	Uncredited
1960	The Story of Ruth	Ruth's Father	Uncredited
1960	Inherit the Wind	Hotel Clerk	Uncredited
1960	One Foot in Hell	Banker	Uncredited
1961	Police Dog Story	Firebug	
1962	Lonely Are the Brave	Vagrant Convict	Uncredited
1962	Beauty and the Beast	Mario	
1964	A Tiger Walks	Man Yelling News	Uncredited
1965	Cat Ballou	James	Uncredited
1965	The Cincinnati Kid	Old Man	Uncredited
1966	Follow Me, Boys!	Charlie, Court Bailiff	Uncredited
1967	A Guide for the Married Man	Man in Steam Room	Uncredited
1968	Dayton's Devils	Fisherman	
1969	A Time for Dying	Milton	
1969	Hail, Hero!	Painter #1	
1969	Hello, Dolly!	Pushcart Man	Uncredited
1970	The Baby Maker	Toy Shop Owner	Uncredited
1975	The Apple Dumpling Gang	Old Prospector	Uncredited
1975	The Hindenburg	Man at Lakehurst	Uncredited
1976	The Missouri Breaks	Freighter	
