= Larry Parks =

American actor (1914–1975)

- Parks in 1950
- Born: Samuel Lawrence Klusman Parks; December 13, 1914; Olathe, Kansas, U.S.
- Died: April 13, 1975 (aged 60); Studio City, California, U.S.
- Occupations: Actor; singer
- Years active: 1941–1975
- Spouse: Betty Garrett (m. 1944)
- Children: 2, including Andrew Parks

Samuel Lawrence Klusman Parks (December 13, 1914 – April 13, 1975) was an American stage and film actor. His career arced from bit player and supporting roles to top billing, before it virtually ended when he admitted to having been a member of a Communist Party cell, which led to his blacklisting by all Hollywood studios. His best known role was Al Jolson, whom he portrayed in two films: The Jolson Story (1946) and Jolson Sings Again (1949).

== Life and career ==
Parks was born in Olathe, Kansas, the son of Nellie (Klusman) and Frank H. Parks. He was raised in his mother's religion of Judaism. He grew up in Joliet, Illinois, and graduated from Joliet Township High School in 1932.

He attended the University of Illinois as a pre-med student, and played in stock companies for some years.

He traveled to Hollywood at John Garfield's suggestion, for a role in a Warner Bros. production of Mama Ravioli. Although the movie was cancelled, Parks did sign a contract with Columbia Pictures in 1941.

== Supporting player ==
As with most Columbia contract players, Parks received supporting roles in high-budget films and more substantial roles in B pictures.

=== In supporting roles ===
1941:

- Mystery Ship
- Harmon of Michigan
- You Belong to Me
- Three Girls About Town
- Sing for Your Supper

1942:

- Harvard, Here I Come
- Blondie Goes to College
- Canal Zone
- Alias Boston Blackie
- North of the Rockies
- Hello, Annapolis
- Submarine Raider
- They All Kissed the Bride
- Flight Lieutenant
- Atlantic Convoy
- A Man's World
- The Boogie Man Will Get You
- You Were Never Lovelier

1943:

- Power of the Press
- Reveille with Beverly
- Redhead from Manhattan
- First Comes Courage
- Destroyer
- Is Everybody Happy?
- Deerslayer

1944:

- The Racket Man
- Hey, Rookie
- Jam Session

== Leading man ==
By 1944 Parks broke into lead and featured player roles:

- The Black Parachute (1944)
- Stars on Parade (1944)
- Sergeant Mike (1944)
- She's a Sweetheart (1944)
- Counter-Attack (1945)
- Renegades (1946)

=== The Jolson Story ===
In November 1944 Columbia was preparing a screen biography of Al Jolson, and Larry Parks was the first actor tested for The Story of Jolson, as the project was then titled. Then the studio considered or tested dozens of other candidates – including James Cagney and Danny Thomas, both of whom declined – until, as Parks recalled, "someone said 'Let's test that first guy again.' I had the dubious honor of making the first and last tests for the role."

Parks impressed the producers and won the role. At the age of 31, his performance in The Jolson Story (1946) earned him an Academy Award nomination for Best Actor.

He received rave reviews for his performance. Showmen's Trade Review: "Parks is a tremendously effective actor in this role. He must have worked almost endlessly to effect so perfectly the Jolson speech and the Jolson mannerism (in minute detail) in putting over the songs." Box Office Digest: "The outstanding facet of The Jolson Story is one Larry Parks. Jolson's voice on the soundtrack supplies some 15 of his most memorable songs. From there on this youngster Larry Parks takes up the chore of giving us Jolson physically. The result is uncanny and impressive. Before the end the stuttering critics were wondering whether Jolson could have played Jolson as well. That's sumpin." Arthur Beach of the National Board of Review: "Larry Parks is a prettier Al than Al. He is also an astonishingly capable mimic. Mr. Parks' skill and the magic of movie technique have made possible an astounding fusion of two people to create a memorable portrait. Even Al Jolson should be pleased with The Jolson Story." Columbia's president Harry Cohn rewarded Parks with a cash bonus and a new Ford convertible.

== Stardom ==
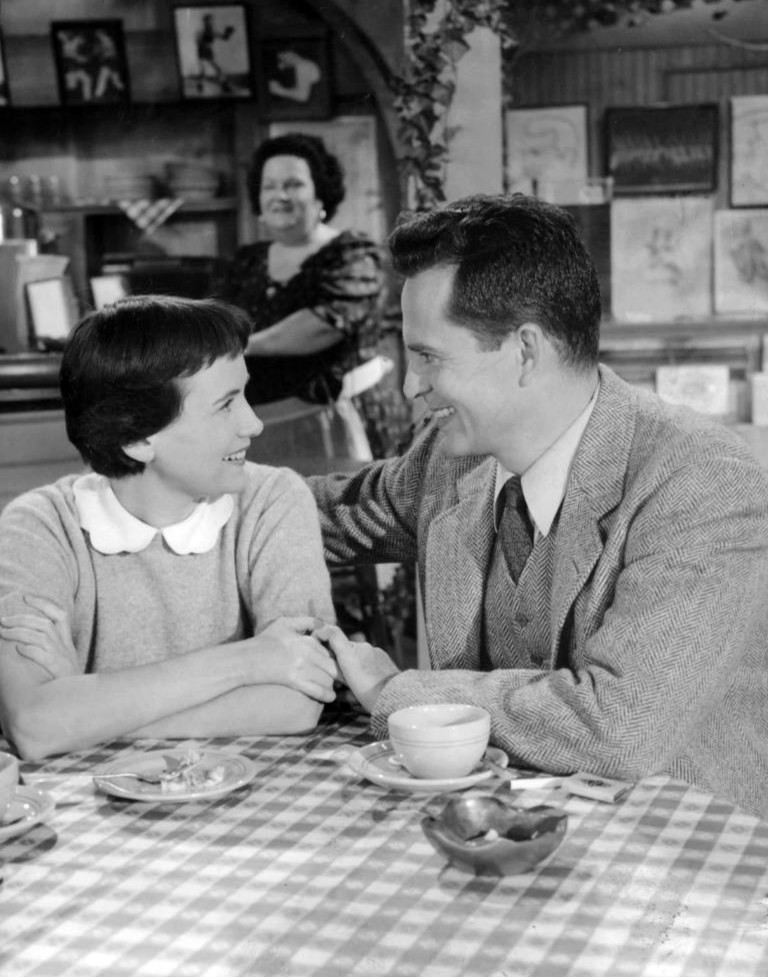
Parks with Teresa Wright in The Happiest Day, a 1954 Ford Theatre presentation

Now that Parks was a full-fledged star, Columbia kept him busy in elaborate productions. He appeared opposite the studio's biggest star, Rita Hayworth, in Down to Earth (1947), a musical sequel to Columbia's 1941 fantasy Here Comes Mr. Jordan. Exhibitors voted him one of America's biggest boxoffice stars, ranking at No. 15. Columbia tried to mold him into a dashing, romantic leading man by casting him in two swashbucklers, The Swordsman (1948) and The Gallant Blade (1948, filmed in Cinecolor).

Parks tried to break his contract with Columbia in 1948. Modern Screen, publishing an interview with Parks, explained the situation: "Larry's battle with his studio has nothing to do with money. What he's wrangling about concerns a contract signed before, not after, The Jolson Story. Larry says he has a year to go on his contract. Columbia says he has five. He's up for a suit for declaratory relief. That's lawyer language, but it means a verdict to clear Larry's studio future. If he wins, he'll go right back to work for another year and then call his own shots. If he loses, he'll be Mister Columbia for five more terms." Federal judge William Carey Mathes heard the case and sympathized with Parks but ruled against him. Trade publisher Pete Harrison commented on the outcome: "[A] practice that was condemned by Judge Mathes in no uncertain terms is the one by which a company, at a time when only a short period remains on a rising star's contract, insists that the star sign a new term contract, using as a blackjack the threat to assign the star to minor roles in "B" pictures for the remainder of the existing contract if he or she should refuse to sign the new contract. Parks claimed that such coercive methods had been employed by Columbia to obtain his signature on a new contract and, from the evidence, Judge Mathes found that it had been obtained by undue influence, indicating that he might have ruled in Parks' favor had he not waited too long to file the suit."

He remained on the Columbia payroll and starred in Jolson Sings Again (1949), another huge box office hit earning Parks another set of rave reviews. Showmen's Trade Review: "Larry Parks, who scored a triumph in his original role of the singer, seems even more assured and more at home in the role in this follow-up film; he doesn't perform Jolson, he IS Jolson [capitalization theirs]." Thomas M. Pryor of The New York Times wrote, "The vitality of the Jolson voice is suitably matched in the physical representation provided by Larry Parks, who by now comes close to perfection in aping the vigorous expression with which Jolson tackles a song." His co-star in the film, Barbara Hale, teamed with him again in the comedy feature Emergency Wedding (1950).

In 1950 he and his wife Betty Garrett announced plans to make their own film, Stakeout. British exhibitors voted him the 9th-most popular star in the United Kingdom.

== Blacklisting ==
In 1948 Parks had criticized the House Un-American Activities Committee (HUAC). In 1951, Parks was summoned to appear before the HUAC under threat of being blacklisted in the movie industry, but he begged not to be forced to testify. He eventually did so in tears, only to be blacklisted anyway. Parks eventually gave up the names of his former colleagues to the committee.

Following his admission before the committee, Columbia Pictures released him from his contract, although it had four years to run, and Parks had been set to star in the film Small Wonder (which later became The First Time starring Robert Cummings). At the time, Parks' fee was $75,000 a film. A romantic comedy he made for MGM, Love Is Better Than Ever, was shelved until 1953.

He made a TV film for The Ford Television Theatre in 1953 and starred in the British film Tiger by the Tail (1955) in England.

He continued to squeeze out a living acting on the stage and doing occasional television programs. His last appearance in a major role was in the John Huston film Freud (1962).

=== Later career ===
Parks eventually left the film industry and formed a successful construction business. Eventually, he and his wife Betty Garrett owned many apartment buildings scattered throughout the Los Angeles metropolitan area. Rather than sell them upon completion, Parks decided to retain ownership and collect rents as a landlord, a decision that proved to be extremely profitable. During that period, the couple occasionally performed in Las Vegas showrooms, summer stock productions, and touring companies of Broadway shows. In 1963 he portrayed Jeff Pringle in Anita Rowe Block's Love and Kisses at the Music Box Theatre.

== Personal life ==
Parks married actress Betty Garrett in 1944. She starred in Hollywood films such as On the Town and on television as Archie Bunker's neighbor Irene Lorenzo on All in the Family and as landlady Edna Babish on Laverne and Shirley. Her career also faced turmoil as a result of her marriage to Parks, and the two spent much of the 1950s doing theatre and musical variety shows. Together, they had two sons, actor Andrew Parks and composer Garrett Parks. Larry Parks was also godfather to actor Jeff Bridges.

Parks died of a heart attack in 1975 at the age of 60.

== Filmography ==
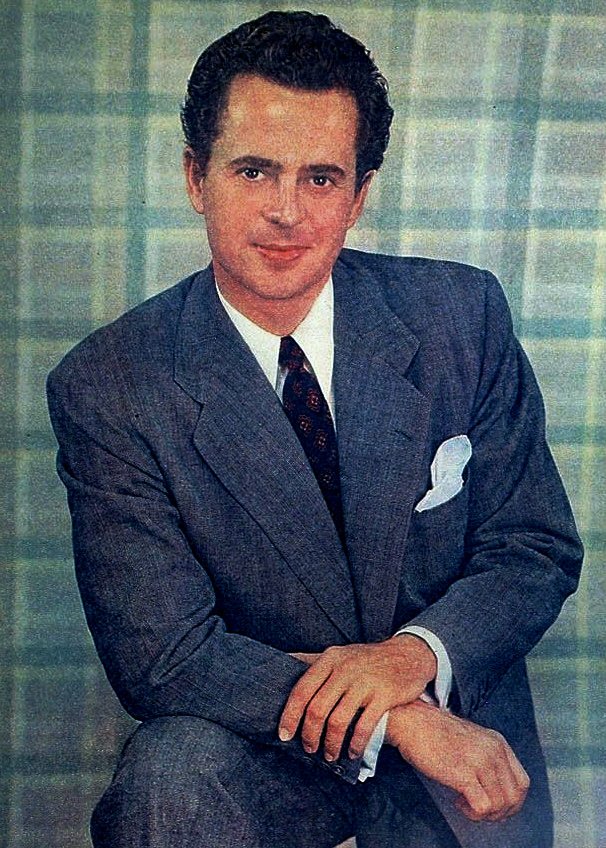
Parks in 1947

- Mystery Ship (1941) as Tommy Baker
- Harmon of Michigan (1941) as Harvey
- You Belong to Me (1941) as Blemish (uncredited)
- Three Girls About Town (1941) as Reporter
- Sing for Your Supper (1941) as Mickey (uncredited)
- Honolulu Lu (1941) as Sailor (uncredited)
- Harvard, Here I Come! (1941) as Eddie Spellman
- Blondie Goes to College (1942) as Rusty Bryant
- Canal Zone (1942) as Recruit Kincaid
- Alias Boston Blackie (1942) as Joe Trilby
- North of the Rockies (1942) as Jim Bailey
- Hello, Annapolis (1942) as Paul Herbert
- Submarine Raider (1942) as Sparksie
- They All Kissed the Bride (1942) as Joe Krim (uncredited)
- Flight Lieutenant (1942) as Cadet Sandy Roth (uncredited)
- Atlantic Convoy (1942) as Gregory
- A Man's World (1942) as Chick O'Driscoll
- The Boogie Man Will Get You (1942) as Bill Layden
- You Were Never Lovelier (1942) as Tony (uncredited)
- Power of the Press (1943) as Jerry Purvis (uncredited)
- Reveille with Beverly (1943) as Eddie Ross
- Redhead from Manhattan (1943) as Flirt (uncredited)
- First Comes Courage (1943) as Capt. Langdon (uncredited)
- Destroyer (1943) as Ens. Johnson (uncredited)
- Is Everybody Happy? (1943) as Jerry Stewart
- The Deerslayer (1943) as Jingo-Good
- The Racket Man (1944) as Larry Lake
- Hey, Rookie (1944) as Jim Leighter
- Jam Session (1944) as Actor at Superba Pictures (uncredited)
- The Black Parachute (1944) as Michael Kaligor Lindley
- Stars on Parade (1944) as Danny Davis
- Sergeant Mike (1944) as Pvt. Tom Allen
- She's a Sweetheart (1944) as Rocky Hill
- Counter-Attack (1945) as Kirichenko
- Renegades (1946) as Ben Dembrow (Ben Taylor)
- The Jolson Story (1946) as Al Jolson
- Down to Earth (1947) as Danny Miller
- Her Husband's Affairs (1947) as himself (uncredited)
- The Swordsman (1948) as Alexander MacArden
- The Gallant Blade (1948) as Lt. David Picard
- Jolson Sings Again (1949) as Al Jolson
- Emergency Wedding (1950) as Peter Judson Kirk Jr.
- Love Is Better Than Ever (1952) as Jud Parker
- Tiger by the Tail (1954, UK) as John Desmond
- Freud: The Secret Passion (1962, UK) as Dr. Joseph Breuer (final film role)
