= Ferris Taylor =

American actor (1888–1961)

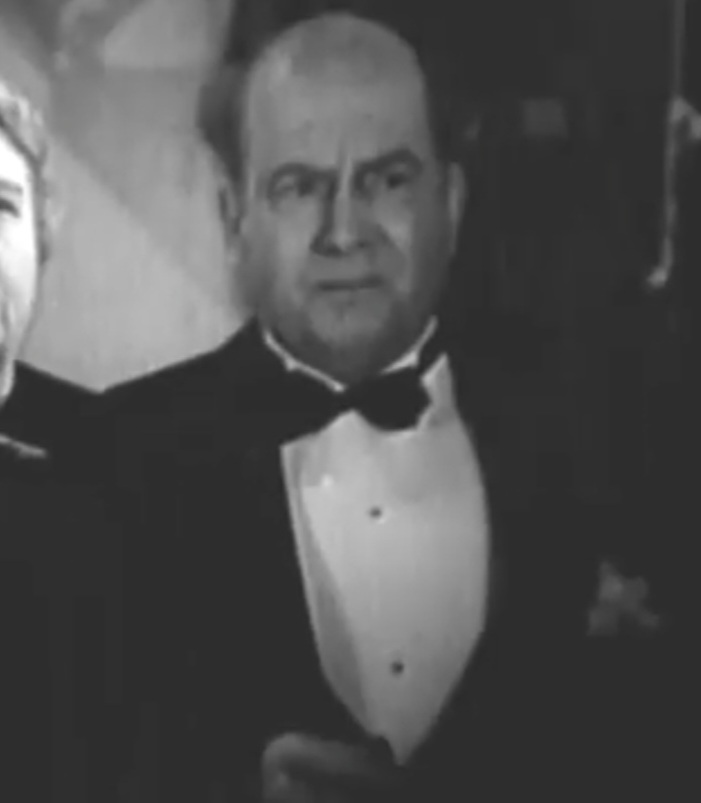
- Ferris Taylor in The Zero Hour (1939)
- Born: Robert Ferris Taylor; March 25, 1888; Henrietta, Texas, U.S.
- Died: March 7, 1961 (aged 72); Hollywood, California, U.S.
- Occupations: Actor; vaudeville performer
- Years active: 1933–1958

Robert Ferris Taylor (March 25, 1888 – March 7, 1961) was an American film actor and vaudeville performer.

== Biography ==
Taylor owned a vaudeville company, the Taylor Players. Besides his acting, Taylor sometimes sang in vaudeville programs. A 1922 newspaper article noted, "he possesses a deep baritone-basso voice". The group included his brother, Glen H. Taylor, who later became a U.S. senator from Idaho.

In 1930, Taylor went to Hollywood, gaining a few appearances in films in bit parts and as an extra. He eventually appeared in more than 120 films between 1933 and 1958. He also made guest appearances on The Cisco Kid starring Duncan Renaldo and Leo Carrillo in the early 1950s.

He died in Hollywood, California from a heart attack.

== Partial filmography ==
- Mr. Dodd Takes the Air (1937)
- Luck of Roaring Camp (1937)
- He Couldn't Say No (1938)
- Santa Fe Stampede (1938)
- Man of Conquest (1939)
- Chip of the Flying U (1939)
- The Zero Hour (1939)
- Dark Command (1940)
- Ladies Must Live (1940)
- Ridin' on a Rainbow (1941)
- A Man Betrayed (1941)
- Hello, Annapolis (1942)
- A Man's World (1942)
- Black Arrow (1944)
- The Town Went Wild (1944)
- Bringing Up Father (1946)
- Curley (1947)
- The Prince of Peace (1948)
- Tricky Dicks (1953)
