= The Zero Hour (1939 film) =

1939 American melodramatic film directed by Sidney Salkow

- Directed by: Sidney Salkow
- Written by: Garrett Fort
- Produced by: Sol C. Siegel
- Starring: Frieda Inescort; Otto Kruger; Adrienne Ames
- Cinematography: Ernest Miller
- Edited by: William Morgan
- Music by: Cy Feuer; William Lava; Paul Sawtell (all uncredited)
- Production company: Republic Pictures
- Distributed by: Republic Pictures Corporation
- Release date: May 26, 1939
- Running time: 53 minutes (American edited version); 65 minutes
- Country: United States
- Language: English

The Zero Hour is a 1939 American drama film directed by Sidney Salkow.

== Plot ==
A kindly theatrical producer mentors a beautiful young girl and helps her to become a big Broadway star. In time the two fall in love and decide to wed. En route to a justice of the peace, tragedy strikes the happy couple and the would-be groom ends up permanently paralyzed. Still, his girl remains devoted to him and the marriage proceeds. Nine years pass and the woman decides she wants to adopt a child. All things seem to be in place for the adoption, but a widower shows up to claim the child. The wife and the widower begin an affair soon after meeting. When the husband finds out, he selflessly executes his final option to ensure his wife's future happiness.

== Cast ==
- Frieda Inescort as Linda Marsh
- Otto Kruger as Julian Forbes
- Adrianne Ames as Susan
- Don Douglas as Brewster
- Jane Darwell as Sophie
- J. M. Kerrigan as Timothy
- Ann Todd as Beth
- Leonard Carey as Butler
- Sarah Padden as Sister Theodosia
- Ferris Taylor as Weber
- Willard Parker as Lansdowne
- Landers Stevens as Doctor
