= Howard J. Green =

American screenwriter

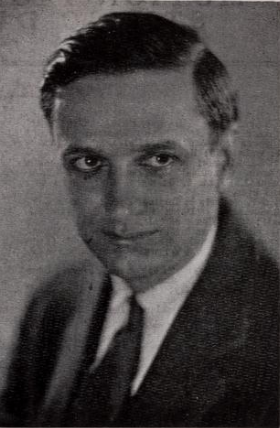
- Born: Howard Jefferson Green; March 20, 1893; San Francisco, California, US
- Died: September 2, 1965 (aged 72); Los Angeles, California, US
- Occupation: Screenwriter
- Years active: 1927–1959

Howard J. Green (March 20, 1893 – September 2, 1965) was an American screenwriter who worked in film and television. He was the first president of the Screen Writers Guild and a founder of the subsequent Writers Guild of America, West.

== Career ==
Green attended Hastings Law College in San Francisco during which he wrote multiple musical comedies. Once his scripts began getting local production, he gave up law to pursue newspaper reporting and began as a news reporter in San Francisco and St. Louis before settling in New York and joining the New York Clipper. After serving in World War I, he returned to New York and became managing editor of Theatre World.

Green's experience at Theatre World led him to begin writing scripts again and he wrote vaudeville shows as well as sketches for the Garrick Gaieties and Greenwich Village Follies. He would then form the Hocky-Green vaudeville production firm with fellow writer Milton Hocky.

The silent film actor Johnny Hines eventually suggested that Green try his hand at screenwriting and in 1926 he moved to Los Angeles to join Metro-Goldwyn-Mayer as a "gag man" writer. Green made his motion picture debut as a "comedy constructor" for The Brown Derby and his first screen credit was for The Kid Brother in 1927.

In 1932, Green penned I Am a Fugitive from a Chain Gang, based upon the autobiography of a chain gang escapee, which was nominated for the Academy Award for Best Picture but also had a significant impact on film-goers in the United States. The film fueled protests against the chain gang system which ultimately led to reforms of the system and the elimination of chain gangs in Georgia in 1937.

In 1933, at a time when writers were looking to organize against the studios, Green suggested reviving the Screen Writers Guild, which began as a social club in 1921, as a union. Green then became the union's first president.

Green would write over 60 films throughout his career and in 1951 he turned to television, beginning with an episode of The Adventures of Kit Carson. He would then write episodes for over 20 television shows, including multiple episodes for Gruen Guild Theater, Chevron Theatre, Public Defender and the Pepsi-Cola Playhouse.

== Personal life ==
On April 25, 1923, Green married Irma Heinemann at the St. Regis Hotel in New York. The couple had two children; Howard Jr. and Eleanor.

== Selected filmography ==
As screenwriter

- The Kid Brother (1927)
- White Pants Willie (1927)
- Vamping Venus (1928)
- The Head Man (1928)
- Restless Youth (1928)
- Marked Money (1928)
- The Sideshow (1928)
- Behind Closed Doors (1929)
- The Faker (1929)
- The Younger Generation (1929)
- The Donovan Affair (1929)
- The Long, Long Trail (1929)
- Broadway Scandals (1929)
- Song of Love (1929)
- The Melody Man (1930)
- High Society Blues (1930)
- Cheer Up and Smile (1930)
- On Your Back (1930)
- Part Time Wife (1930)
- The Princess and the Plumber (1930)
- Maker of Men (1931)
- A Dangerous Affair (1931)
- The Cohens and Kellys in Hollywood (1932)
- Blessed Event (1932)
- They Call It Sin (1932)
- I Am a Fugitive from a Chain Gang (1932)
- Trick for Trick (1933)
- Morning Glory (1933)
- Man of Two Worlds (1934)
- Success at Any Price (1934)
- Shoot the Works (1934)
- The Lemon Drop Kid (1934)
- Rumba (1935)
- Star of Midnight (1935)
- Men Without Names (1935)
- If You Could Only Cook (1935)
- Devil's Squadron (1936)
- Meet Nero Wolfe (1936)
- They Met in a Taxi (1936)
- New Faces of 1937 (1937)
- This Way Please (1937)
- Making the Headlines (1938)
- Curtain Call (1940)
- Dreaming Out Loud (1940)
- The Mad Doctor (1941)
- Two in a Taxi (1941)
- Harmon of Michigan (1941)
- Reveille with Beverly (1943)
- After Midnight with Boston Blackie (1943)
- High Explosive (1943)
- Doughboys in Ireland (1943)
- The Racket Man (1944)
- Take It Big (1944)
- Having Wonderful Crime (1945)
- George White's Scandals (1945)
- San Quentin (1946)
- The Invisible Wall (1947)
- The Winner's Circle (1948)
- Military Academy with That Tenth Avenue Gang (1950)
- State Penitentiary (1950)
- Chain Gang (1950)
- My True Story (1951)
