= Love Is Better Than Ever =

1952 film by Stanley Donen

- Theatrical release poster
- Directed by: Stanley Donen
- Written by: Ruth Brooks Flippen
- Produced by: William H. Wright
- Starring: Larry Parks; Elizabeth Taylor
- Cinematography: Harold Rosson
- Edited by: George Boemler
- Music by: Lennie Hayton
- Production company: Metro-Goldwyn-Mayer
- Distributed by: Loew's Inc.
- Release date: February 23, 1952
- Running time: 81 minutes
- Country: United States
- Language: English
- Budget: $941,000
- Box office: $974,000

Love Is Better Than Ever is a 1952 American romantic comedy film directed by Stanley Donen from a screenplay by Ruth Brooks Flippen, starring Larry Parks and Elizabeth Taylor. The plot concerns a small-town girl who falls in love with a Broadway talent agent.

== Plot ==
Broadway talent agent and bachelor Jud Parker is summoned by a client to New Haven, Connecticut, where he settles a dispute and meets dance instructor Anastacia "Stacie" Macaboy, to whom he is immediately attracted. Stacie consults with Jud about featuring her dancing routine.

A few days later, Stacie cancels next week's dancing class to attend a conference for dance instructors in New York. Stacie's mother Mrs. Macaboy plans to attend, as well as Mrs. Levoy and her daughter Pattie Marie, who intend to open a rival dancing school. However, Mrs. Macaboy sprains her ankle and stays behind.

In New York, Stacie crosses paths with Jud, who takes her to lunch, a baseball game and the 21 Club for dinner before repairing to the Hotel Astor, and Stacie falls in love. For several days, Jud and Stacie spend time together as she ignores her mother's messages. On her final night in New York, Stacie expresses her love for Jud, but she is heartbroken when he intends to remain single. When they return to the Astor, Mrs. Macaboy has arrived in Stacie's room and sends Jud away.

Back in New Haven, Stacie tells her father about her love for Jud. He advises her to use Jud's love of baseball to entice him. Sometime later, Jud is furious when a newspaper reports that he and Stacie are engaged. He confronts Stacie, who explains that she and her mother created the fictional engagement to deflect gossip around town that could destroy her reputation as a dancing teacher. Stacie persuades Jud to play his part in the plan, posing as her fiancé over the course of several weekends in New Haven. She promises to stage a breakup scene in public to end the charade after the gossip dissipates. By seeming to choose the school over her fiancé, she will bolster her standing with the ladies of the town.

Jud arrives at the dancing school, where Stacie announces that they will be married after the upcoming recital. That evening, when Staci and Jud start to kiss, Jud claims that she is trying to trap him. He returns to New York and the newspaper questions whether the engagement was real.

At home, Stacie learns that her dance students are withdrawing and that the Levoys are opening a rival dancing school. In desperation, she travels to New York to have Jud break the fake engagement at the recital. She proposes a bet that if the New York Giants lose their game, he will stage a breakup, but if the Giants win, Stacie will leave Jud alone. After the Giants win, Stacie returns home in defeat.

At the recital, Mr. Macaboy alerts Stacie that Jud has arrived. Before she performs with her students, Stacie thanks Jud and states she is leaving for Long Beach, California. As he tries to understand what she means, the recital begins. During one act, Jud hides on the stage and falls through a trap door to talk to Stacie. In a dressing room, Jud states that he will marry her. They admit their love for each other and kiss while Stacie's parents watch.

== Cast ==
- Larry Parks as Jud Parker
- Elizabeth Taylor as Anastacia "Stacie" Macaboy
- Josephine Hutchinson as Mrs. Macaboy
- Tom Tully as Mr. Charles E. Macaboy
- Ann Doran as Mrs. Levoy
- Elinor Donahue as Pattie Marie Levoy
- Kathleen Freeman as Mrs. Kahrney
- Doreen McCann as Albertina Kahrney
- Alex Gerry as Hamlet (Smittie's regular)
- Dick Wessel as Smitty - cafe owner
- John Handley as Johnny - Little boy dancer who plays the "grape" (uncredited)
- Florence Ravenel as Mother (uncredited)
- Gene Kelly and Stanley Donen make uncredited cameo appearances as themselves seated at a table at 21 Restaurant.

== Reception ==
=== Box office ===
According to MGM records, the film earned $634,000 in the US and $340,000 elsewhere resulting in a loss of $362,000.

=== Critical reaction ===
Bosley Crowther of The New York Times wrote Elizabeth Taylor was the "only remotely valid reason" to see the film, but was unconvinced by Larry Parks' characterization, writing: "The churlishness of this fellow is not the fault of Mr. Parks. Ruth Brooks Flippen, who wrote the screen play, made him an insufferable boor, and Mr. Parks plays him as directed."

William Brogdon of Variety called the film a "reasonable amount of lightly-paced fun". Harrison's Reports wrote: "Although it is on the whole a fairly amusing comedy-drama, the story is not strong enough for the stars. A few of the routines in which Miss Taylor teaches tots how to dance slow up the pace, but in the main the action keeps the spectator interested. The comedy is light, except in the slapstick situations where Larry Parks stumbles and falls — these should cause roars of laughter."

Time magazine wrote: "Elizabeth Taylor, ineptly striving for comic form, reveals a photogenic figure, but Parks falls flat on his farce. Completed early in 1951, Love Is Better Than Ever was temporarily shelved for political reasons, after Parks appeared last March before the Un-American Activities Committee and admitted that he was once a Communist Party member. The whole movie might well have been shelved permanently for artistic reasons."
