= Sergeant Mike =

1944 film directed by Henry Levin

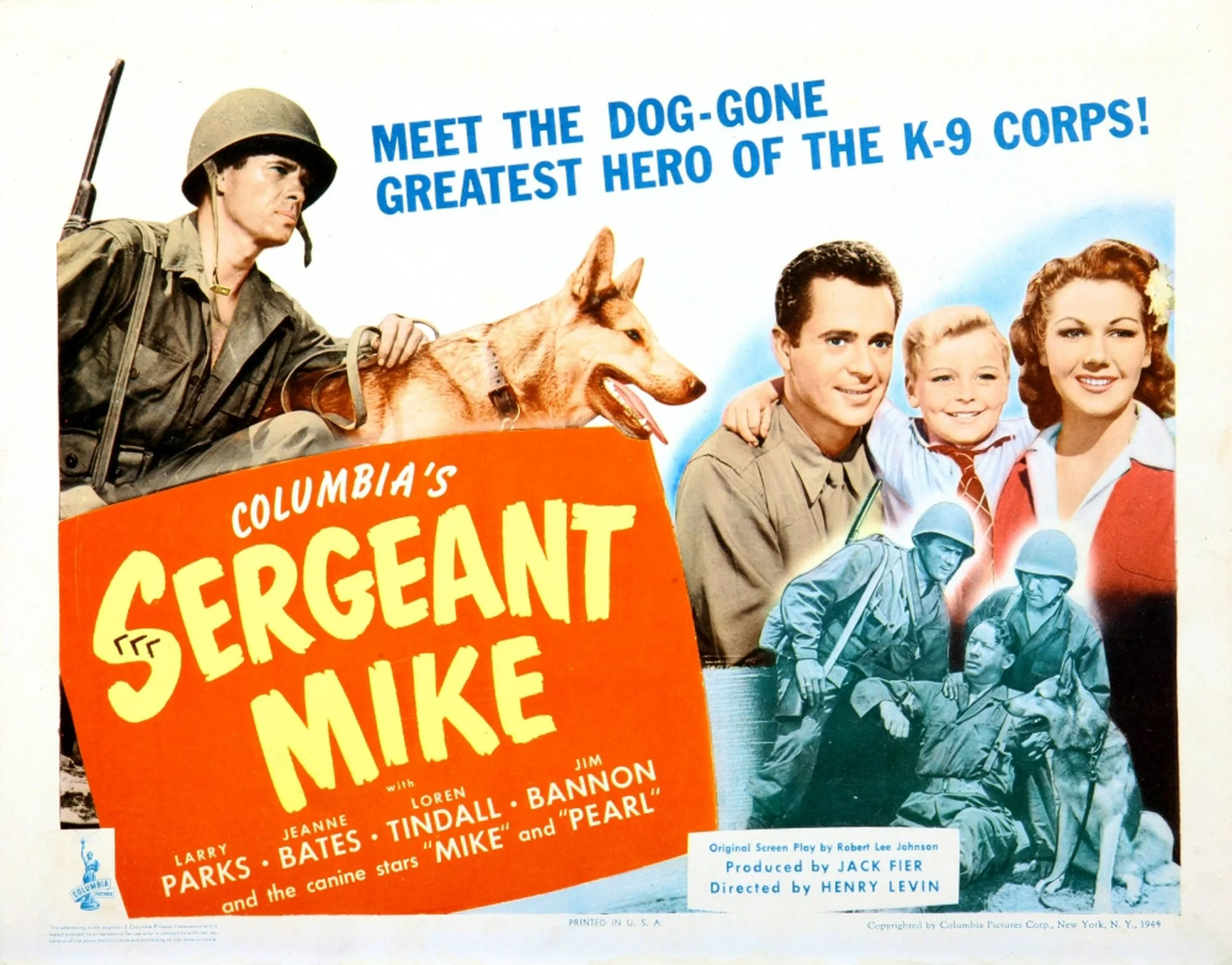
- Lobby card
- Directed by: Henry Levin
- Written by: Robert Lee Johnson
- Produced by: Jack Fier
- Starring: Larry Parks; Jeanne Bates; Loren Tindall
- Cinematography: L. William O'Connell
- Edited by: Al Clark; Reg Browne
- Music by: Mischa Bakaleinikoff
- Production company: Columbia Pictures
- Distributed by: Columbia Pictures
- Release date: November 11, 1944 (US)
- Running time: 60 minutes
- Country: United States
- Language: English

Sergeant Mike is a 1944 American drama film directed by Henry Levin, which stars Larry Parks, Jeanne Bates, and Loren Tindall.

== Plot ==
Soldiers are assigned to train dogs for fighting.

== Cast ==
- Larry Parks as Pvt. Tom Allen
- Jeanne Bates as Terry Arno
- Loren Tindall as Simms
- Jim Bannon as Patrick Henry
- Robert Williams as Sgt. Rankin
- Richard Powers as Reed
- Larry Joe Olsen as S. K. Arno
- Eddie Acuff as Monnohan
- John Tyrrell as Pvt. Rogers
- Charles Wagenheim as Hall

== Production ==
Filming started June 1944.

== Reception ==
Variety declared "this actionful war yarn... will get plenty of the juve trade for which it is seemingly geared."
