= Mystery Ship (film) =

1941 film directed by Lew Landers

- Directed by: Lew Landers
- Screenplay by: David Silverstein; Houston Branch
- Story by: Alex Gottlieb
- Produced by: Jack Fier
- Starring: Paul Kelly; Lola Lane; Larry Parks
- Cinematography: L. William O'Connell
- Edited by: James Sweeney
- Music by: Mischa Bakaleinikoff
- Production company: Columbia Pictures
- Distributed by: Columbia Pictures
- Release date: August 18, 1941
- Running time: 65 minutes
- Country: United States
- Language: English

Mystery Ship is a 1941 American spy thriller film directed by Lew Landers and starring Paul Kelly, Lola Lane and Larry Parks. It was produced and distributed by Columbia Pictures.

== Synopsis ==
A group of arrested spies and saboteurs have been expelled from the still neutral United States. Two FBI agents are put in charge of the ship carrying them overseas but face an attempted uprising to seize the vessel.

== Cast ==
- Paul Kelly as Allan Harper
- Lola Lane as Patricia Marshall
- Larry Parks as Tommy Baker
- Trevor Bardette as Ernst Madek
- Cy Kendall as Condor
- Roger Imhof as Capt. Randall
- Eddie Laughton as Turillo
- John Tyrrell as Sam
- Byron Foulger as Wasserman
- Dick Curtis as Van Brock
- Dwight Frye as Rader
- Kenneth MacDonald as Gorman
- Herbert Rawlinson as Inspector Clark
- Wade Boteler as Inspector Mike O'Shea

== Production ==
The film was one of the first Larry Parks made under his contract with Columbia. He came to the studio's attention doubling for Robert Montgomery doing tests for Here Comes Mr Jordan. Filming started 15 May 1941.

== Bibliography ==
- Fetrow, Alan G. Feature Films, 1940-1949: a United States Filmography. McFarland, 1994.
