= Hey, Rookie =

1944 film directed by Charles Barton

- Directed by: Charles Barton
- Written by: Henry Myers; Edward Eliscu; Jay Gorney
- Produced by: Irving Briskin
- Starring: Ann Miller; Joe Besser; Larry Parks
- Cinematography: L. William O'Connell
- Edited by: James Sweeney
- Distributed by: Columbia Pictures
- Release date: April 6, 1944 (United States)
- Running time: 87 minutes
- Country: United States
- Language: English

Hey, Rookie is a 1944 American musical film starring Ann Miller and Larry Parks.

== Cast ==
- Ann Miller ... Winnie Clark
- Joe Besser ... Pendelton (Pudge) Pfeiffer
- Larry Parks ... Jim Leighter
- Joe Sawyer ... Sergeant
- Jimmy Little ... Bert Pfeiffer
- Selmer Jackson ... Col. Robbins
- Larry Thompson ... Capt. Jessop
- Barbara Brown ... Mrs. Clark
- Charles Trowbridge ... General Willis
- Charles C. Wilson ... Sam Jonas
- Syd Saylor ... Cpl. Trupp
- Doodles Weaver ... Maxon

== Production ==
"This photoplay is based upon the musical stage production 'Hey, Rookie', as originally presented by the 'Yardbirds of Fort MacArthur'.

Hey Rookie was a traveling Army show during World War II that was written and produced by soldiers stationed at Fort MacArthur. The show raised $250,000 that was used to help fund construction of a swimming pool, which opened in June 1943. The swimming pool was renovated and reopened in 2016.
