= She's a Sweetheart =

1944 film by Del Lord

- Directed by: Del Lord
- Written by: Muriel Roy Bolton
- Produced by: Ted Richmond
- Starring: Jane Frazee
- Cinematography: Benjamin H. Kline
- Edited by: Al Clark
- Production company: Columbia Pictures
- Distributed by: Columbia Pictures
- Release date: December 7, 1944
- Running time: 69 minutes
- Country: United States
- Language: English

She's a Sweetheart is a 1944 American musical film directed by Del Lord and starring Jane Frazee.

== Plot ==
A woman known to all simply as "Mom" runs a canteen where soldiers in particular are welcome. Maxine is a singer at the club and has stolen the heart of one of Mom's favorite young men, Rocky, who is about to return to active duty.

Mom keeps an eye on several couples. Frances is jealous because Jimmy has asked her to help him compose love letters. Jeannie is unaware that the soldier she loves, Paul, has returned from the war. Paul was honorably discharged with an injury but is reluctant to be loved by Jeannie out of pity.

Rocky was unhappy when he left after being led to believe Maxine was leading him on all along. He is reported missing in action, causing Maxine and Mom to both miss him terribly. Frances is delighted to learn that those love letters were for her. When she and Jimmy are wed, Jeannie is shocked to find Paul there and they are reunited. At a party honoring the troops, a sad Maxine, while singing to the men, looks up and is thrilled to see Rocky.

== Cast ==
- Jane Frazee as Maxine Lecour
- Larry Parks as Rocky Hill
- Jane Darwell as Mom
- Nina Foch as Jeannie
- Ross Hunter as Paul
- Jimmy Lloyd as Pete Ryan
- Loren Tindall as Jimmy Loomis
- Carole Mathews as Frances
- Eddie Bruce as Fred Tilly
- Pat Lane as Matt
- Danny Desmond as Poker
- Ruth Warren as Edith
- Dave Willock as Wes
