= Hello, Annapolis =

1942 film directed by Charles Barton

- Directed by: Charles Barton
- Screenplay by: Donald Davis; Tom Reed
- Produced by: Wallace MacDonald
- Starring: Tom Brown; Jean Parker
- Cinematography: Philip Tannura
- Edited by: Arthur Seid
- Production company: Columbia Pictures
- Distributed by: Columbia Pictures
- Release date: April 23, 1942
- Running time: 65 minutes
- Country: United States
- Language: English

Hello, Annapolis is a 1942 American comedy film directed by Charles Barton and starring Tom Brown and Jean Parker. Filming started in January 1942.

== Plot ==
Doris Henley attracts the attention of Bill Arden and Paul Herbert. Arden and Herbert sign up at Annapolis Naval Academy in order to impress the young lady. Arden finds he dislikes the life of a naval man, until he saves his rival's life in a fire. Arden is badly burned in the effort, but earns the respect of others, which makes him rethink his views.

== Cast ==
- Tom Brown as Bill Arden
- Jean Parker as Doris Henley
- Larry Parks as Paul Herbert
- Phil Brown as Kansas City
- Joseph Crehan as Evans Arden
- Thurston Hall as Capt. Wendall
- Ferris Taylor as Capt. Forbes
- Herbert Rawlinson as Capt. Dugan
- Mae Busch as Miss Jenkins
- Robert Kellard as George Crandall (billed as Robert Stevens)
- Stanley Brown as Norman Brennan
- William Blees as Hazlett Houston
- Georgia Caine as Aunt Arabella
