= Prison Ship (1945 film) =

1945 film

- Directed by: Arthur Dreifuss
- Written by: Ben Markson; Josef Mischel
- Produced by: Alexis Thurn-Taxis
- Starring: Nina Foch; Robert Lowery; Richard Loo
- Cinematography: Philip Tannura
- Edited by: Aaron Stell
- Music by: Mischa Bakaleinikoff
- Production company: Columbia Pictures
- Distributed by: Columbia Pictures
- Release date: November 15, 1945
- Running time: 58 minutes
- Country: United States
- Language: English

Prison Ship is a 1945 American war drama film directed by Arthur Dreifuss and starring Nina Foch, Robert Lowery and Richard Loo. It was produced and distributed by Columbia Pictures. Set during Pacific Campaign during World War II it was released several months after VJ Day ended the conflict.

== Plot ==
A Japanese tanker carrying Allied prisoners from a Pacific island to Japan is used as a decoy to draw the attention of American submarines and lure them to their destruction. The captives launch a failed attempt to take over the ship and in retaliation the captain orders the shooting of woman and children. Anne Graham, a British journalist, and Tom Jeffries manage to make contact with a nearby American submarine which attacks the ship and rescues the surviving passengers.

== Cast ==
- Nina Foch as Anne Graham
- Robert Lowery as Tom Jeffries
- Richard Loo as Capt. Osikawa
- Ludwig Donath as Professor
- Mark Roberts as Maj. Trevor
- Barry Bernard as Jim Priestley
- Erik Rolf as Jan Van Steen
- David Hillary Hughes as Steve Huntley
- Louis Mercier as Pierre 'Frenchie' Le Blon
- Moy Ming as Chan Kwan
- Barbara Pepper as Winnie De Voe
- Tom Dillon as Submarine Captain
- Gene Garrick as U.S. Submarine Officer
- Robert B. Williams as Prisoner
- Jessie Arnold as Prisoner
- Blandine Ebinger as Prisoner

== Bibliography ==
- Fetrow, Alan G. Feature Films, 1940–1949: a United States Filmography. McFarland, 1994.
- Shull, Michael S. . Hollywood War Films, 1937–1945: An Exhaustive Filmography of American Feature-Length Motion Pictures Relating to World War II. McFarland, 2006.
