= Youth on Trial =

1945 film by Budd Boetticher

- Directed by: Budd Boetticher (as Oscar Boetticher Jr.)
- Screenplay by: Michael Jacoby (as Michel Jacoby)
- Produced by: Ted Richmond
- Starring: Cora Sue Collins; David Reed; Eric Sinclair; Georgia Bayes; Robert B. Williams
- Cinematography: George Meehan
- Edited by: Gene Havlick
- Production company: Columbia Pictures
- Distributed by: Columbia Pictures
- Release date: January 11, 1945
- Running time: 59 minutes
- Country: United States
- Language: English

Youth on Trial is a 1945 American crime drama film noir mystery film directed by Budd Boetticher (as Oscar Boetticher Jr.) and starring Cora Sue Collins, David Reed, Eric Sinclair, Georgia Bayes and Robert B. Williams.

== Plot ==
A female juvenile court judge learns that her own daughter is one of the town delinquents in this minor low-budget potboiler.

== Cast ==
- Cora Sue Collins as Cam Chandler
- David Reed as Tom Lowry
- Eric Sinclair as Denny Moore
- Georgia Bayes as Meg Chandler
- Robert B. Williams as Officer Ken Moore (as Robert Williams)
- Mary Currier as Judge Julia Chandler
- John Calvert as Jud Lowry

== See also ==
- List of American films of 1945
