= Harmon of Michigan =

1941 film

- Directed by: Charles Barton
- Screenplay by: Howard J. Green
- Story by: Richard Goldstone; Stanley Rauh; Fredric M. Frank
- Produced by: Wallace MacDonald
- Starring: Tom Harmon; Anita Louise; Forest Evashevski; Oscar O'Shea; Warren Ashe
- Cinematography: John Stumar
- Edited by: Arthur Seid
- Music by: Morris Stoloff
- Production company: Columbia Pictures
- Distributed by: Columbia Pictures
- Release date: September 11, 1941
- Running time: 65 minutes
- Country: United States
- Language: English

Harmon of Michigan is a 1941 American sports film directed by Charles Barton and starring Tom Harmon, Anita Louise and Larry Parks. Ostensibly a biopic about University of Michigan football player Harmon's post-collegiate career as a coach, it was actually filmed immediately upon his graduation and is thus entirely fictional. Harmon, who was an all-American and Heisman Trophy winner at Michigan, plays himself in the film.

== Cast ==
- Tom Harmon as himself
- Anita Louise as Peggy Adams
- Forest Evashevski as himself
- Oscar O'Shea as "Pop" Branch
- Warren Ashe as Bill Morgan
- Stanley Brown as Freddy Davis
- Ken Christy as Joe Scudder
- Tim Ryan as Flash Regan
- William Hall as Coach Jimmy Wayburn
- Larry Parks as Harvey
- Lloyd Bridges as Ozzie
- Chester Conklin as Gasoline Chuck

== Bibliography ==
- Fetrow, Alan G. Feature Films, 1940-1949: a United States Filmography. McFarland, 1994.
