= A Man's World (1942 film) =

1942 film directed by Charles Barton

- Directed by: Charles Barton
- Screenplay by: Edward T. Lowe; Jack Roberts
- Story by: Jack Roberts; George Bricker
- Produced by: Wallace MacDonald
- Starring: William Wright; Marguerite Chapman; Larry Parks
- Cinematography: George Meehan
- Edited by: Dick Fantl
- Music by: M. W. Stoloff
- Production company: Columbia Pictures
- Release date: September 17, 1942
- Running time: 63 minutes
- Country: United States
- Language: English

A Man's World is a 1942 American drama film, directed by Charles Barton. It stars William Wright, Marguerite Chapman, and Larry Parks, and was released on September 17, 1942.

== Cast ==
- William Wright as Dan O'Driscoll
- Marguerite Chapman as Mona Jackson (aka Mona Smith)
- Larry Parks as Chick O'Driscoll
- Wynne Gibson as Blossom Donovan
- Roger Pryor as Bugsy Nelson
- Frank Sully as Sammy Collins
- Ferris Taylor as Chief DeShon
- Edward Van Sloan as Doc Stone
- Clancy Cooper as John Black
- James Millican as Parks
- Lloyd Bridges as Brown
- Al Hill as Eddie Dartlett
- Ralph Peters as Vince Carrol
- Alan Bridge as Capt. Peterson
- Eddie Kane as Doc Drake
- Beulah Parkington as Girl
- Grace Lenard as Girl
- Diana Snyder as Girl
- Thelma White as Girl
- Frank Richards as Thomas
- Shirley Patterson as Nurse Bentley
