= The Gallant Blade =

1948 film by Henry Levin

- Directed by: Henry Levin
- Produced by: Irving Starr
- Starring: Larry Parks
- Cinematography: Charles Lawton Jr. Burnett Guffey
- Edited by: Viola Lawrence
- Music by: George Duning
- Color process: Cinecolor
- Production company: Columbia Pictures
- Distributed by: Columbia Pictures
- Release date: October 23, 1948 (New York City)
- Running time: 81 minutes
- Country: United States
- Language: English

The Gallant Blade is a 1948 American Cinecolor adventure film directed by Henry Levin and starring Larry Parks.

== Plot ==
A peasant becomes the hero of France in the 17th century after the Thirty Years' War.

== Cast ==
- Larry Parks as Lt. David Picard
- Marguerite Chapman as Nanon de Lartigues
- Victor Jory as Marshall Mordore
- George Macready as General Cadeau
- Edith King as Madame Chauvignac
- Michael Duane as Paul Brissac
- Onslow Stevens as General de la Garance
- Peter Brocco as Sgt. Jacques
- Tim Huntley as Mayor Lanier
- Ross Ford as Henri

== Production ==
Columbia announced in 1945 they would make The Gallant Blade based on a short story by Alexandre Dumas. It was to be a follow-up to The Fighting Guardsman. It was part of a boom in swashbuckling pictures in 1945.

The film was not made immediately. In 1947 Irving Starr was announced as producer and Charles Vidor as director. Then Vidor was replaced by Henry Levin. Larry Parks was signed to star. He had just made a swashbuckler for Columbia, The Swordsman, then initiated legal proceedings against the studio in July to get out of this contract with them. Parks had refused payment since then; he agreed to be paid for The Gallant Blade on the proviso it did not affect his legal actions.

Filming started 1 December 1947. It was also known as The Gay Blade.

== Reception ==
Variety wrote "pic can't miss with its pace, color and potent marquee values... Levin keeps the action rolling with headline speed."

Variety listed the film as a box office disappointment.
