= Out of the Depths (1945 film) =

- Film poster
- Directed by: D. Ross Lederman
- Written by: Martin Berkeley; Ted Thomas; Aubrey Wisberg
- Produced by: Wallace MacDonald
- Starring: Jim Bannon; Ross Hunter; Ken Curtis
- Cinematography: Philip Tannura
- Edited by: Paul Borofsky
- Production company: Columbia Pictures
- Release date: December 27, 1945
- Running time: 61 minutes
- Country: United States
- Language: English

Out of the Depths is a 1945 American war drama film directed by D. Ross Lederman.

== Plot ==
At the end of World War II, a U.S. Navy submarine receives an order to bring aboard Ito Kaita, a Korean American intelligence agent who joined with the resistance movement in Japanese-occupied Korea. The crew enthusiastically receives news of the surrender of Japan but gets into a skirmish with an Imperial Japanese Navy battleship refusing to surrender. After being rescued, Kaita informs the crew that a rogue Japanese aircraft carrier will attack the surrender ceremony aboard the USS Missouri in Tokyo Bay. A kamikaze attack from the rogue carrier destroys the submarine's antenna before they can warn their superiors. Captain Faversham is killed trying to fix it, and the submarine begins to sink and fill with chlorine after being hit. The crew decide to stop the carrier by ramming their submarine into it, and both ships explode. The four surviving men receive the Medal of Honor at the White House.

== Cast ==
- Jim Bannon as Capt. Faversham
- Ross Hunter as Clayton Shepherd
- Ken Curtis as Buck Clayton
- Loren Tindall as Pete Lubowsky
- Mark Roberts as 'Pills' Wilkins (as Robert E. Scott)
- Frank Sully as 'Speed' Brogan
- Robert Williams as First Officer Ross
- Coulter Irwin as 'Sparks' Reynolds
- George Khan as Lt. Ito Kaida
- George Offerman Jr. as 'Ten-to-One' Ryan
