= Home in San Antone =

1949 film by Ray Nazarro

- Theatrical release poster
- Directed by: Ray Nazarro
- Written by: Barry Shipman
- Produced by: Colbert Clark
- Starring: Roy Acuff; The Smoky Mountain Boys; The Modernaires; Doye O'Dell; Lyn Thomas; Bill Edwards
- Cinematography: Vincent J. Farrar
- Edited by: Paul Borofsky
- Production company: Columbia Pictures
- Distributed by: Columbia Pictures
- Release date: April 15, 1949
- Running time: 62 minutes
- Country: United States
- Language: English

Home in San Antone is a 1949 American Western musical film directed by Ray Nazarro, and starring Roy Acuff, The Smoky Mountain Boys, The Modernaires, Doye O'Dell, Lyn Thomas, and Bill Edwards. The film was released by Columbia Pictures on April 15, 1949.

== Cast ==
- Roy Acuff as Roy Acuff aka Jack Jones
- The Smoky Mountain Boys as Roy Acuff Band
- The Modernaires as Vocal Quintet
- Doye O'Dell as Radio Singer
- Lyn Thomas as June Wallace (as Jacqueline Thomas)
- Bill Edwards as Ted Gibson
- George Cleveland as Grandpa Gibson
- Lloyd Corrigan as Uncle Zeke Tinker
- William Frawley as O'Fleery
- Fred F. Sears as Rado Announcer Breezy (as Fred Sears)
- Dorothy Vaughan as Ma Gibson
- Ivan Triesault as Jewel Thief
- Matt Willis as Jewel Thief Thorg
- Sam Flint as Dan Wallace
- Eddie Acuff as Postman (uncredited)
- Slim Duncan as Fiddle Player (uncredited)
- Ralph Dunn as Cop at Road Block (uncredited)
- Peggy Leon as Middle Aged Woman (uncredited)
- Lee Phelps as Police Captain (uncredited)
- Bertha Priestley as Fat Woman (uncredited)
- Rudy Sooter as Musician (uncredited)
- Robert B. Williams as Arresting Officer (uncredited)
