= North of the Rockies =

1942 film by Lambert Hillyer

- Directed by: Lambert Hillyer
- Written by: Norman Deming (adaptation)
- Screenplay by: Herbert Dalmas
- Story by: Herbert Dalmas
- Produced by: Leon Barsha
- Starring: Bill Eillott; Tex Ritter
- Cinematography: George Meehan
- Edited by: Mel Thorsen
- Production company: Columbia Pictures
- Distributed by: Columbia Pictures
- Release date: April 2, 1942
- Running time: 60 minutes
- Country: United States
- Language: English

North of the Rockies is a 1942 American Western film directed by Lambert Hillyer and starring Bill Elliott and Tex Ritter.

== Plot ==
In this Western, a Canadian Mountie rounds up gang of fur smugglers.

== Cast ==
- Bill Elliott as Sergeant Wild Bill Cameron
- Tex Ritter as Tex Martin
- Frank Mitchell as Cannonball Rideaux
- Shirley Patterson as Lydia Rogers
- Larry Parks as Jim Bailey
- John Miljan as Lionel Morgan
- Ian MacDonald as Lazare
- Lloyd Bridges as Constable McDowell
- Gertrude Hoffman as Flora Bailey
- Earl Gunn as John Callan
- Boyd Irwin as Mountie Captain Adams
- Tex Palmer as Fur Trapper

== See also ==
- List of American films of 1942
