= Canal Zone (film) =

1942 film by Lew Landers

- Theatrical film poster
- Directed by: Lew Landers
- Screenplay by: Robert Lee Johnson
- Based on: "Heroes Come High" by Blaine Miller and Jean DuPont Miller
- Produced by: Colbert Clark; Irving Briskin (executive producer)
- Starring: Chester Morris; Forrest Tucker
- Cinematography: Franz Planer
- Edited by: Art Bell; James Sweeney
- Music by: M. W. Stoloff
- Production company: Columbia Pictures Corp.
- Distributed by: Columbia Pictures
- Release date: March 19, 1942
- Running time: 79 minutes B&W
- Country: United States
- Language: English

Canal Zone is a 1942 American aviation adventure film starring Chester Morris and Forrest Tucker. The action takes place in the Panama Canal Zone and revolves around aviators in an out-of-the-way air base flying USAAF bombers. (Note: The "flying fortress" was the Boeing B-17 Flying Fortress.)

== Plot ==
Ginger Bar, a former banana-shipping station on the outskirts of the Panama Canal, had been converted to a training-and-relay station for the U. S. Army. The Commander Merrill (Stanley Andrews), an ex-service flier, is in charge of the station It is his job to train civilian airmen to handle bombers, transforming them into pilots of the "flying fortresses". They will fly bombers to Africa and back for further training.

As one of a new group of pilot, the conceited, reckless society playboy, Harley Ames (John Hubbard), arrives at Ginger Bar. The others include Kincaid (Larry Parks), from Alabama, Madigan (Forrest Tucker), an ex- marine; Hughes, a former player with the Brooklyn Dodgers and Baldwin (Lloyd Bridges), a former insurance agent who trained with the Civil Aeronautics Board.

Although he is a capable pilot, Ames immediately incurs the animosity of the training-officer, "Hardtack" Hamilton (Chester Morris). Not only is Ames reckless, he is also making a play for Susan Merril (Harriet Hilliard), the Commanding Officer's daughter with whom "Tack" is in love.

Because of a broken date by Susan, Ames gets drunk and, the next day, crashes his aircraft on combat training crashing his aircraft into Kincaid's, killing his friend. Now, he must redeem himself. He will get a chance when "Tack" and another pilot have a crash in the jungle. Ames, knowing that Susan is in love with Tack, takes off without orders. He locates Tack in the jungle and brings him safely home to Susan. When the squadron takes off again, Ames leaves for Africa, declaring that he intends to find a little excitement there.

== Cast ==
- Chester Morris as "Hardtack" Hamilton
- Harriet Hilliard as Susan Merrill
- John Hubbard as Harley Ames
- Larry Parks as Kincaid
- Forrest Tucker as Madigan
- Eddie Laughton as Hughes
- Lloyd Bridges as Baldwin
- George McKay as MacNamara
- Stanley Andrews as Commander Merrill
- John Tyrrell as "Red" Connors
- Stanley Brown as Jones
- John Shay as Henshaw
- Paul Phillips as Bailey
- Arthur O'Connell as Fledgling
- Hugh Beaumont as Radio operator
- Betty Roadman as Pearl
- Louis Jean Heydt as Ralph Merrill
- James Khan as Monkey vendor

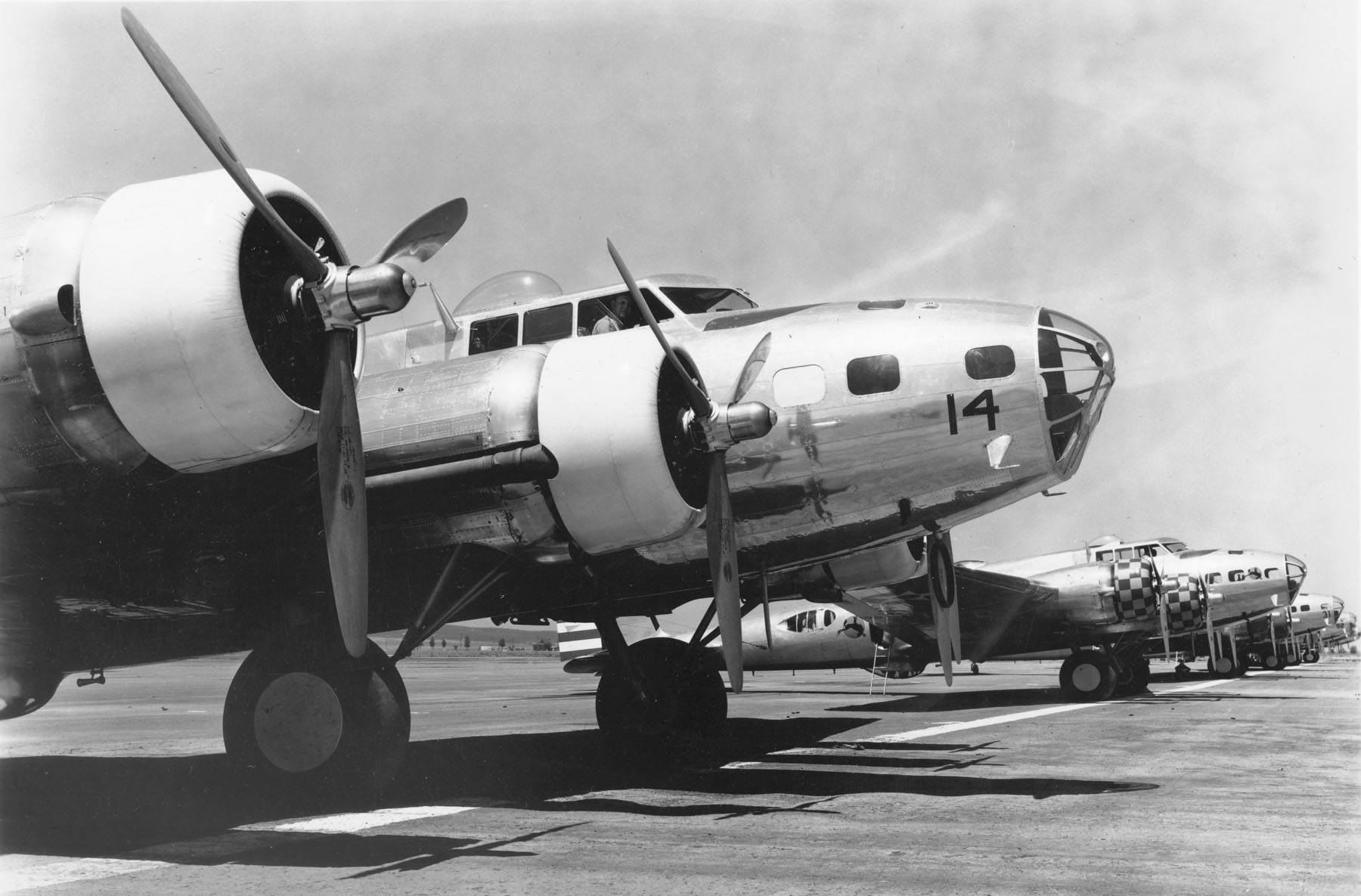
Boeing B-17B bombers

== Production ==
Canal Zone was based on the short story "Heroes Come High" by Blaine Miller and Jean Dupont Miller in American Magazine (February 1937).

== Reception ==
Theodore Stauss, film reviewer for The New York Times, thought Canal Zone "silly", writing: "The characters of their Central American relay and training station are too silly to find their bearings in a third-rate drama, much less in the air. Though there is some highfalutin' talk about destiny and 'kicking the sky around,' the story of "Canal Zone" never gets its wheels off the ground."

Aviation film historian James H. Farmer, dismissed the film as "(a) fourth-rate B film." In Aviation in the Cinema, aviation film historian Stephen Pendo considered Canal Zone, "... a cliché ridden effort."

== See also ==
- Naval Base Panama Canal Zone
