= After Midnight with Boston Blackie =

1943 film by Lew Landers

- Directed by: Lew Landers
- Written by: Jack Boyle (character); Aubrey Wisberg (story); Howard J. Green
- Produced by: Sam White
- Starring: Chester Morris; Richard Lane; Ann Savage; George E. Stone; Lloyd Corrigan
- Cinematography: L. William O'Connell
- Edited by: Richard Fantl
- Music by: M. W. Stoloff
- Production company: Columbia Pictures
- Distributed by: Columbia Pictures
- Release date: March 18, 1943
- Running time: 65 minutes
- Country: United States
- Language: English

After Midnight with Boston Blackie is a 1943 crime film directed by Lew Landers. It is the fifth of a series of 14 Columbia Pictures films starring Chester Morris as Boston Blackie. When a recently paroled friend of Boston Blackie is killed, he finds himself once again the prime suspect of Police Inspector Farraday.

== Plot ==
When "Diamond" Ed Barnaby is paroled, he sets out to give $100,000 worth of diamonds to his daughter, Betty. Aware that several shady characters know he has the jewels, he stashes them in a safe deposit box in the Arcade Building. Betty later receives a call asking her to meet him there, but he never shows up. She contacts her father's only real friend: Horatio Black, better known as Boston Blackie. He agrees to help and drops Betty off at the apartment of his wealthy friend, Arthur Manleder, for safekeeping. His sidekick, "the Runt", has to postpone his wedding to statuesque bubble dancer Dixy Rose Blossom.

Blackie discovers which deposit box Barnaby rented. Meanwhile, crooks Joe Herschel, Sammy Walsh and Marty Beck force their prisoner, Ed Barnaby, to reveal where he hid the diamonds. When the trio leave, Barnaby manages to telephones the police, but is killed by Herschel. Inspector Farraday learns enough from the call to rush over to the Arcade Building with Sergeant Mathews. He apprehends Blackie on suspicion of murdering Barnaby just as he is about to open the box. The box turns out to be empty.

Blackie manages to escape. When he returns to Manleder's apartment, he finds that Betty has been kidnapped. A note offers to exchange her for the diamonds. Blackie has the Runt "borrow" a brooch from Dixy, and pries off the fake diamonds.

He then heads to the Flamingo Club, run by Herschel and his associates. Slipping inside undetected, he spies through the keyhole of the door to Herschel's office and sees the crook put the diamonds in his safe. After Herschel leaves, Blackie enters, cracks the safe and takes the jewels. However, before he can leave, Walsh and Beck enter. Thinking quickly, Blackie drops the diamonds in a pitcher of water. Unaware that Herschel double crossed them and had the real diamonds, Walsh and Beck exchange Betty for the fakes. Herschel returns too soon and exposes the fakes, but Blackie and Betty eventually manage to escape, aided by a citywide wartime practice blackout.

Walsh figures out that Herschel is out for himself. When he cannot produce the diamonds, Herschel is shot and killed by Walsh. Blackie returns to retrieve the stones, and witnesses the murder. Afterward, he offers to give the jewels to Walsh for the location of Barnaby's body. When the police close in, the pair sneak out and steal Inspector Farraday's car. Blackie sets the radio to "send" without Walsh noticing, then gets him to confess all with the police listening in. Eventually, Blackie is able to turn the tables and turn Walsh over to the authorities.

The Runt's wedding is interrupted once more, this time by Farraday and Mathews when they arrest Dixy for bigamy.

== Cast ==
- Chester Morris as Horatio "Boston Blackie" Black
- Richard Lane as Inspector Farraday
- Ann Savage as Betty Barnaby
- George E. Stone as The Runt
- Lloyd Corrigan as Arthur Manleder
- Walter Baldwin as Diamond Ed Barnaby
- Don Barclay as Cigar Clerk
- Jane Buckingham as Dixie Rose Blossom
- Eddy Chandler as Police Captain
- Heinie Conklin as Workman
- Dudley Dickerson as Bullfiddle Player
- Dick Elliott as Justice of Peace Potts
- Sam McDaniel as Train Porter (uncredited)
