= Two-Man Submarine =

1944 film directed by Lew Landers

- Theatrical release poster
- Directed by: Lew Landers
- Screenplay by: Griffin Jay; Leslie T. White
- Story by: Robert Creighton Williams
- Produced by: Jack Fier
- Starring: Tom Neal; Ann Savage; J. Carrol Naish; Robert B. Williams; Abner Biberman; George Lynn
- Cinematography: James Van Trees
- Edited by: Jerome Thoms
- Production company: Columbia Pictures
- Distributed by: Columbia Pictures
- Release date: March 16, 1944
- Running time: 62 minutes
- Country: United States
- Language: English

Two-Man Submarine is a 1944 American action film directed by Lew Landers and written by Griffin Jay and Leslie T. White. The film stars Tom Neal, Ann Savage, J. Carrol Naish, Robert B. Williams, Abner Biberman and George Lynn. The film was released on March 16, 1944, by Columbia Pictures.

== Cast ==
- Tom Neal as Jerry Evans
- Ann Savage as Pat Benson
- J. Carrol Naish as Dr. Augustus Hadley
- Robert B. Williams as Walt Hedges
- Abner Biberman as Gabe Fabian
- George Lynn as Norman Fosmer
- Alex Havier as Fuzzytop
