= Eve Knew Her Apples =

1945 film

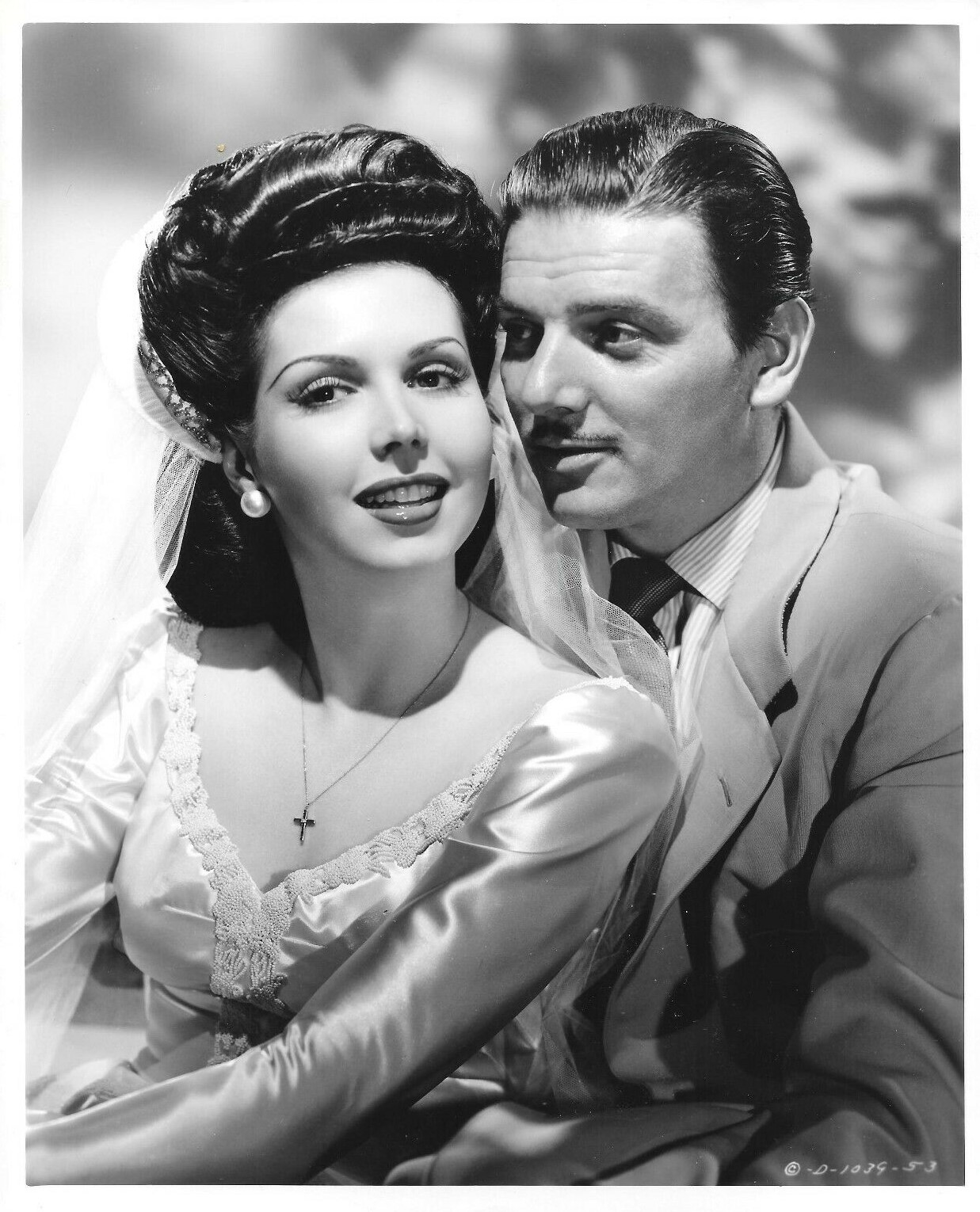
- Ann Miller and William Wright
- Directed by: Will Jason
- Written by: Eddie Moran; Rian James
- Produced by: Wallace MacDonald
- Starring: Ann Miller; William Wright; Robert Williams
- Cinematography: Burnett Guffey
- Edited by: Jerome Thoms
- Music by: George Duning
- Production company: Columbia Pictures
- Distributed by: Columbia Pictures
- Release date: April 20, 1945 (Los Angeles)
- Running time: 64 minutes
- Country: United States
- Language: English

Eve Knew Her Apples is a 1945 musical comedy remake of the 1934 film It Happened One Night directed by Will Jason and starring Ann Miller, William Wright and Robert Williams. The film was produced and distributed by Columbia Pictures, owner of the rights to the original 1934 version, and would be remade as a musical comedy in 1956 as You Can't Run Away from It with June Allyson and Jack Lemmon.

== Cast ==
- Ann Miller as Eve Porter
- William Wright as Ward Williams
- Robert Williams as Steve Ormond
- Ray Walker as George McGrew
- Charles D. Brown as Joe Gordon
- Minta Durfee as Landlady (uncredited)

== Production ==
According to a media report, Eve Knew Her Apples was filmed at Columbia Pictures without the knowledge of studio head Harry Cohn. When Cohn learned of the film, he was irate because he had been planning for a long time to remake It Happened One Night as a musical starring Rita Hayworth.

== Reception ==
Eve Knew Her Apples opened in small markets in March 1945 before opening in Los Angeles and New York in April.

In a contemporary review for the New York Daily News, critic Wanda Hale wrote: "Many succeeding comedies have been influenced by 'It Happened One Night,' but never before has a comedy borne such a resemblance ... Columbia produced both pictures so I guess the great likeness is legitimate. ... [I]t's so much like it in the second half that it's downright funny."
