= Power of the Press (film) =

1943 film by Lew Landers

- Directed by: Lew Landers
- Screenplay by: Robert Hardy Andrews (as Robert D. Andrews)
- Story by: Samuel Fuller (as Sam Fuller)
- Produced by: Leon Barsha
- Starring: Guy Kibbee; Gloria Dickson; Lee Tracy; Otto Kruger; Victor Jory
- Cinematography: John Stumar
- Edited by: Mel Thorsen
- Music by: Paul Sawtell (uncredited)
- Production company: Columbia Pictures
- Distributed by: Columbia Pictures
- Release date: January 28, 1943
- Running time: 64 minutes
- Country: United States
- Language: English

Power of the Press is a 1943 American crime film directed by Lew Landers and starring Guy Kibbee, Gloria Dickson, Lee Tracy, Otto Kruger and Victor Jory.

== Plot ==
Ulysses Bradford (Guy Kibbee) is a small-town newspaper publisher who is called in to protect a big-city paper that has come under control of an isolationist, played by Otto Kruger. Tracy plays the managing editor, who has been going along with the regime but suffers a crisis of conscience when Kruger has the paper's publisher murdered and frames an ex-employee (an unbilled Larry Parks), making up and printing lurid details of the crime to boost circulation.

== Cast ==
- Guy Kibbee as Ulysses Bradford
- Gloria Dickson as Edwina Stephens
- Lee Tracy as Griff Thompson
- Otto Kruger as Howard Raskin
- Victor Jory as Oscar Trent
