= Atlantic Convoy =

1942 film

- Original lobby card
- Directed by: Lew Landers
- Written by: Robert Lee Johnson [original screenplay]
- Produced by: Colbert Clark
- Starring: Bruce Bennett; Virginia Field
- Cinematography: Henry Freulich
- Edited by: James Sweeney
- Music by: Morris Stoloff [musical director]
- Distributed by: Columbia Pictures
- Release date: July 2, 1942
- Running time: 66 minutes
- Country: United States
- Language: English

Atlantic Convoy is a 1942 American war film directed by Lew Landers.

== Plot ==
Naval patrols based on the Icelandic coast battle the German U-boats during World War II, as the Germans attempt to infiltrate their operations with spies and saboteurs.

== Cast ==
- Bruce Bennett as Captain Morgan
- Virginia Field as Lida Adams
- John Beal as Carl Hansen
- Clifford Severn as Sandy Brown
- Larry Parks as Gregory
- Lloyd Bridges as Bert
- Victor Kilian as Otto
- Hans Schumm as Commander von Smith
- Erik Rolf as Gunther
- Eddie Laughton as Radio Operator
- Wilhelm von Brincken as U-Boat Officer
