= Rough, Tough and Ready =

1945 film directed by Del Lord

- Directed by: Del Lord
- Written by: Edward T. Lowe Jr.
- Produced by: Alexis Thurn-Taxis
- Starring: Chester Morris; Victor McLaglen; Jean Rogers
- Cinematography: George Meehan
- Edited by: Richard Fantl
- Music by: Marlin Skiles
- Production company: Columbia Pictures
- Distributed by: Columbia Pictures
- Release date: March 22, 1945
- Running time: 66 minutes
- Country: United States
- Language: English

Rough, Tough and Ready is a 1945 American war comedy drama film directed by Del Lord and starring Chester Morris, Victor McLaglen and Jean Rogers. It aimed to replicate the success of the series of buddy films that McLaglen had previously starred in with Edmund Lowe.

The film's sets were designed by the art director Walter Holscher.

== Plot ==
A Deep sea diver who runs a maritime salvage company enlists after the Attack on Pearl Harbor. He and his best friend compete for the attention of women, particularly the salvage company's co-owner, who has joined the Women's Army Corps.

== Main cast ==
- Chester Morris as Brad Crowder
- Victor McLaglen as Owen McCarey
- Jean Rogers as Jo Matheson
- Veda Ann Borg as Lorine Gray
- Amelita Ward as Kitty Duval
- Robert B. Williams as Paul
- John Tyrrell as Herbie
- Fred Graff as Tony

== Bibliography ==
- Michael S. Shull. Hollywood War Films, 1937–1945: An Exhaustive Filmography of American Feature-Length Motion Pictures Relating to World War II. McFarland, 2006.
