= The Swordsman (1948 film) =

1948 film by Joseph H. Lewis

- Theatrical release poster
- Directed by: Joseph H. Lewis
- Written by: Wilfred H. Petitt
- Produced by: Burt Kelly
- Starring: Larry Parks; Ellen Drew; George Macready
- Cinematography: William E. Snyder
- Edited by: Al Clark
- Music by: Hugo Friedhofer
- Distributed by: Columbia Pictures
- Release date: January 2, 1948
- Running time: 80 minutes
- Country: United States
- Language: English
- Box office: $1.7 million (US rentals)

The Swordsman is a 1948 American historical adventure film directed by Joseph H. Lewis and starring Larry Parks, Ellen Drew and George Macready. It was produced and distributed by Columbia Pictures.

== Plot ==
In 18th century Scotland, the clans McArden and Glowan are at long standing feud. Alexander, an attractive McArden, falls in love with the beautiful Barbara Glowan.

Unfortunately their relationship angers Barbara's cousin, Robert Glowan, who attempts to destroy the McArden clan completely. Alexander, anxious to marry Barbara, works to end the feud and have the two clans live at peace.

The movie has an interesting parallel with the Massacre of Glencoe, as commented below.

== Cast ==
- Larry Parks as Alexander MacArden aka Donald Frazer
- Ellen Drew as Barbara Glowan
- George Macready as Robert Glowan
- Edgar Buchanan as Angus MacArden
- Ray Collins as MacIan, the MacArden Chief
- Marc Platt as Murdoch Glowan
- Michael Duane as Colin Glowan
- Holmes Herbert as Lord Glowan
- Nedrick Young as Bruce Glowan
- Robert Shayne as Ronald MacArden
- Billy Bevan as Old Andrew
- Lumsden Hare as Reverend Douglas

== Production ==
The film was based on an original script by Wilfrid Pitit. It was originally called Annie Laurie, then in November 1946, the title was changed to The Forge Man by which time Larry Parks was set to star and Joseph H Lewis was to direct. The same month, Hedda Hopper said the movie's title was Glencoe and that it was filming in secrecy.

Filming finished by March 1947.

== Reception ==
The New York Times called it "a plain old fashioned horse opera" noting many of the situations and dialogue could have come straight from a Western.

== The Glencoe parallel ==
The massacre of Glencoe is an infamous chapter in Scottish history. In late January, 1692, a party of about 120 men, under Captain Robert Campbell of Glenlyon asked for lodging to the MacDonalds of Glencoe. They were well received, the MacDonalds ignoring that the party was actually a punitive expedition sent for petty motives: their Chief, Alasdair Mac Iain, had been, due to bad weather and other reasons — some totally beyond his control — 6 days late to take an oath of allegiance to King William III but which had been, nevertheless, taken and accepted on 6 January. However, in the early morning of 13 February, following orders received on the previous night, they massacred the MacDonalds, killing Mac Iain and about 30 others. In the movie, Captain Robert Glowan pays a friendly visit to the MacArdens with a similar intent — he has a small group with him but his brother Bruce waits in the valley with a larger troop. However, the action of the beautiful Lady Barbara Glowan frustrates their plan: she suspects her cousin's intents and sends a messenger to Lord Glowan, who sends a party of his own men to attack the assailers, thus saving Mac Ian and his MacArdens. Thus, in way, that very sad business is somehow reverted in the movie and given a happy ending.
