= Meet Me on Broadway =

1946 film directed by Leigh Jason

- Theatrical release poster
- Directed by: Leigh Jason
- Screenplay by: George Bricker; Jack Henley
- Story by: George Bricker
- Produced by: Burt Kelly
- Starring: Marjorie Reynolds; Frederick Brady; Jinx Falkenburg; Spring Byington; Allen Jenkins; Gene Lockhart; Loren Tindall
- Cinematography: Burnett Guffey
- Edited by: James Sweeney
- Music by: Morris Stoloff
- Production company: Columbia Pictures
- Distributed by: Columbia Pictures
- Release date: January 26, 1946
- Running time: 78 minutes
- Country: United States
- Language: English

Meet Me on Broadway is a 1946 American comedy film directed by Leigh Jason and written by George Bricker and Jack Henley. The film stars Marjorie Reynolds, Frederick Brady, Jinx Falkenburg, Spring Byington, Allen Jenkins, Gene Lockhart and Loren Tindall. The film was released on January 26, 1946, by Columbia Pictures.

== Plot ==
A Broadway director clashes one too many times with his producer and quits the show and takes his girlfriend the leading lady with him. He believes he can set up more successfully on his own, but soon finds himself in deep financial trouble. He manages to get a booking at a country club but only gets his reluctant girlfriend to perform there by convincing her he has been made manager of it.

== Cast ==
- Marjorie Reynolds as Ann Stallings
- Frederick Brady as Eddie Dolan
- Jinx Falkenburg as Maxine Whittaker
- Spring Byington as Sylvia Storm
- Allen Jenkins as Deacon McGill
- Gene Lockhart as John Whittaker
- Loren Tindall as Bob Storm
- William Forrest as Dwight Ferris
- Kernan Cripps as Gardner
- Frank Dawson as Belden, the Butler
- Ralph Peters as Joe, the Bartender
- Eddie Acuff as Waiter
