= Redhead from Manhattan =

1943 film by Lew Landers

- Theatrical release poster
- Directed by: Lew Landers
- Screenplay by: Joseph Hoffman
- Story by: Rex Taylor
- Produced by: Harry Cohn; Wallace MacDonald
- Starring: Lupe Vélez; Michael Duane; Tim Ryan; Gerald Mohr; Lillian Yarbo; Arthur Loft
- Cinematography: Phillip Tannura
- Edited by: James Sweeney
- Music by: Gil Grau; John Leipold
- Distributed by: Columbia Pictures
- Release date: May 6, 1943
- Running time: 64 minutes
- Country: United States
- Language: English

Redhead from Manhattan is a 1943 comedy film directed by Lew Landers and written by Joseph Hoffman. The film stars Lupe Vélez in one of her last screen appearances, Michael Duane, Tim Ryan, Gerald Mohr, Lillian Yarbo and Arthur Loft. The film was released on May 6, 1943, by Columbia Pictures.

== Plot ==
Lupe Vélez plays a dual role, twin sisters Rita and Elaine. After escaping a torpedoed ship, Rita shows up in Manhattan, where she takes the place of her Broadway-star cousin Elaine, who's having problems with her marriage (she's going to have a baby and her husband doesn't know it) and needs to make a getaway. Neither Elaine's husband nor Rita's saxophone-player boyfriend are aware of the switch.

== Cast ==
- Lupe Vélez as Rita Manners/Elaine Manners
- Michael Duane as Jimmy Randall
- Tim Ryan as Mike Glendon
- Gerald Mohr as Chick Andrews
- Lillian Yarbo as Polly
- Arthur Loft as Sig Hammersmith
- Lewis Wilson as Paul
- Douglas Leavitt as Joe
- Clancy Cooper as Policeman
- Johnny Mitchell as Marty Britt
