= The Racket Man =

1944 film

- Directed by: D. Ross Lederman
- Written by: Howard J. Green; Casey Robinson; Paul Yawitz
- Starring: Tom Neal; Hugh Beaumont
- Cinematography: James Van Trees
- Edited by: Paul Borofsky
- Distributed by: Columbia Pictures
- Release date: January 18, 1944
- Running time: 65 minutes
- Country: United States
- Language: English

The Racket Man is a 1944 American crime film directed by D. Ross Lederman.

== Plot ==
A racketeer gets his draft notice and becomes a soldier. He comes across a criminal organization while in the Army and decides to do something about it.

== Cast ==
- Tom Neal as Matt Benson
- Hugh Beaumont as 'Irish' Duffy
- Jeanne Bates as Phyllis Lake
- Larry Parks as Larry Lake
- Douglas Fowley as Toby Sykes
