= Girl in the Case (1944 film) =

1944 film

- movie poster
- Directed by: William Berke
- Release date: 1944
- Country: United States
- Language: English

Girl in the Case is a 1944 American film. Budd Boetticher did some uncredited directing on it. It was originally directed by William Berke.

Boetticher says "they fired the director and I got the job, and I finished the picture. It was another short schedule picture."

== Cast ==
- Edmund Lowe
- Janis Carter
