= The Black Parachute =

1944 film by Lew Landers

- Directed by: Lew Landers
- Screenplay by: Clarence Upson Young
- Produced by: Jack Fier
- Starring: John Carradine; Osa Massen; Larry Parks
- Cinematography: George Meehan
- Edited by: Otto Meyer
- Music by: Mario Castelnuovo-Tedesco
- Distributed by: Columbia Pictures
- Release date: May 4, 1944
- Running time: 85 minutes
- Country: United States
- Language: English

The Black Parachute is a 1944 American war film directed by Lew Landers and starring John Carradine, Osa Massen and Larry Parks.

The Chicago Daily Tribune said the film had "an engrossing story and is graced by excellent acting - notably that of the young Larry Parks". The Los Angeles Times said the film was "very tensely contrived for its type".

== Cast ==
- John Carradine as General von Bodenbach
- Osa Massen as Marya Orloff
- Larry Parks as Michael Lindley
- Jeanne Bates as Olga
- Jonathan Hale as King Stephen
- Ivan Triesault as Colonel Pavlec
