= Stars on Parade (1944 film) =

1944 film by Lew Landers

- Directed by: Lew Landers
- Starring: Larry Parks
- Cinematography: L. W. O'Connell
- Edited by: Jerome Thoms
- Production company: Columbia Pictures
- Distributed by: Columbia Pictures
- Release date: May 25, 1944
- Running time: 63 minutes
- Country: United States
- Language: English

Stars on Parade is a 1944 American comedy musical film directed by Lew Landers and starring Larry Parks.

== Cast ==
- Larry Parks as Danny Davis
- Lynn Merrick as Dorothy Dean
- Ray Walker as Billy Blake
- Jeff Donnell as Mary Brooks
- Selmer Jackson as J. L. Carson
- Edythe Elliott as Mrs. Dean
- Mary Currier as Nan McNair
- Danny O'Neil (formerly known as Bill Shumate; né William Petree; 1920–2002) as Danny
- Frank Hubert as Frank
- Jean Hubert as The Chords Member
- Nat King Cole as Nat King Cole
- Judy Clark as The Chords Member
- Ben Carter as Ben Carter Choir Member
