= Three Girls About Town =

1941 film by Leigh Jason

- Theatrical poster
- Directed by: Leigh Jason
- Written by: Richard Carroll
- Produced by: Samuel Bischoff
- Starring: Joan Blondell; Binnie Barnes; Janet Blair
- Cinematography: Franz Planer
- Edited by: Charles Nelson
- Music by: Morris Stoloff
- Production company: Columbia Pictures
- Distributed by: Columbia Pictures
- Release date: October 23, 1941
- Running time: 75 minutes
- Country: United States
- Language: English

Three Girls About Town is a 1941 American comedy film directed by Leigh Jason and starring Joan Blondell, Binnie Barnes and Janet Blair (in her film debut). It was produced and distributed by Columbia Pictures. The story was written by Richard Carroll.

== Plot ==
The Merchants Hotel is hosting a convention for morticians and a mediation meeting between aircraft manufacturers and their workers. This makes hotel manager Puddle worry about a newspaper article criticizing the hotel's convention hostesses, sisters Faith and Hope Banner. Tommy Hopkins, a reporter in love with Hope, has tried to get her to take another job with "regular" hours, but she needs the money to pay for the education of her younger sister Charity at an expensive private school. However, right after Hope and Tommy's argument, Charity shows up and announces that she is going to quit school to be a hostess like her sisters. They try to change her mind.

Meanwhile, a dead body is found in the hotel. The sisters, worried about the hotel's already damaged reputation, decide to dump the corpse somewhere else. Hope tries to talk Tommy into doing the moving, but he sees a scoop for his newspaper after recognizing the victim is in fact the missing labor mediator everyone has been waiting for. Hope is unable to persuade him to keep quiet, so they take the body down the fire escape and hide it in a room. Unfortunately, it is discovered by the mortician occupant; he telephones for the police, then runs out.

Hope and Faith retrieve the body and hide it in a laundry cart. Tommy steals it from the girls and, looking for a hiding place from a police search, stumbles upon a high-stakes poker game. He has no choice but to set the body down at the table, calling him "sleepy Joe". The corpse wins every hand he "plays" (with Tommy's help), and the others call him a "lucky stiff". Hope and Faith barge in. Thinking quickly, Hope claims she has been looking for her misbehaving husband. The girls carry "Joe" out, but have to take him into a random room to avoid the chief of police. They dump it in a coffin in mortician Josephus Wiegel's room. The coffin is then hauled away into the morticians' convention room. Fred Chambers, Tommy's editor, finds him, but when Tommy tells him he lost the body, he fires him. Charity, who is strongly attracted to Tommy and has been kissing him at every opportunity, tells him where the body is. After he leaves, Charity tells Hope that Tommy is in love with her.

When The Chronicle, Tommy's former newspaper, reports he found the corpse, the police chase after him. Tommy ends up at the mediation meeting and poses as the mediator. He appeals to both parties' patriotism and manages to get them to reach a compromise.

Afterward, the chief of police arrests him. Hope persuades Puddle to give the body to Tommy, but they drag it into a room full of policemen and are taken into custody themselves. On the way out, Tommy is promoted by the editor, who has learned that he prevented the strike.

When the body is carried out through the hotel lobby, a drunk named Charlemagne recognizes it and, with a clap of his hands, brings it back to life. It turns out he had just put the man in "suspended animation" through hypnosis. Everyone is released. Tommy offers to let the police chief off the hook for false arrest if he can get a marriage license immediately, rather than having to wait days. Hope believes it is Charity he intends to wed, but Tommy corrects her. When Charity shows up and continues lying about her relationship with Tommy, Hope puts her over her knee and spanks her. Faith joins in, followed by Puddle.

== Cast ==
- Joan Blondell as Hope Banner
- Binnie Barnes as Faith Banner
- Janet Blair as Charity Banner
- John Howard as Tommy Hopkins
- Robert Benchley as Wilburforce Puddle
- Hugh O'Connell as Chief of police
- Frank McGlynn Sr. as Josephus Wiegel
- Eric Blore as Charlemagne, a drunk looking for Charlie
- Paul Harvey as Fred Chambers
- Una O'Connor as Maggie O'Callahan, a hotel scrubwoman
- Almira Sessions as Tessie Conarchy, a scrubwoman
- Dorothy Vaughan as Mrs. McDougall, a scrubwoman
- Charles Lane as; Mortician, who finds the body in his bed
- Bess Flowers as Mortician's wife
- Ray Walker as Reporter on Telephone

== Bibliography ==
- Fetrow, Alan G. Feature Films, 1940-1949: a United States Filmography. McFarland, 1994.
