= Boston Blackie Booked on Suspicion =

1945 film by Arthur Dreifuss

- Film poster
- Directed by: Arthur Dreifuss
- Written by: Paul Yawitz; Malcolm Stuart Boylan (story); Jack Boyle (character)
- Produced by: Michael Kraike (as Michel Krauke)
- Starring: Chester Morris; Lynn Merrick; Steve Cochran; Richard Lane; George E. Stone
- Cinematography: George Meehan
- Edited by: Richard Fantl
- Production company: Columbia Pictures
- Distributed by: Columbia Pictures
- Release date: May 10, 1945
- Running time: 66 minutes
- Country: United States
- Language: English

Boston Blackie Booked on Suspicion (also known as Booked on Suspicion) is the eighth of 14 Columbia Pictures B movies starring Chester Morris as reformed thief Boston Blackie.

== Plot ==
Boston Blackie's wealthy friend, Arthur Manleder, purchases an upscale bookstore from aged Wilfred Kittredge, but retains his services as a book expert. However, when Kittredge becomes ill just before an important auction he was to conduct, Blackie proves that he can impersonate him, fooling everyone, including Police Inspector Farraday.

With the assistance of store employee Gloria, Blackie runs the auction without a hitch. The centerpiece is a rare first edition of Charles Dickens' Pickwick Papers, which goes for $62,000. However, the purchaser discovers that the book is a fake and demands his money back. $50,000 had already been sent to the book's owner/forger, Porter Hadley. Blackie tracks him down, but arrives just too late. Hadley's partner, Gloria, finds him packed and ready to leave. She shoots him and takes the money. Blackie hears the gunfire, forcing her to flee; in her haste, the money gets stuck in the other doorway. Blackie takes the envelope of cash. By sheer bad timing, Farraday and Sergeant Matthews arrive while Blackie is examining Hadley's body, and arrest him for murder.

Blackie has little difficulty escaping. Still unaware of the identity of the real murderer, he takes Gloria into his confidence. He puts the money in the store's safe while she watches with interest. That night, she and her husband, escaped safecracker Jack Higgins, break into the shop, but are forced to leave without the cash when Blackie and Arthur arrive.

When Jack arranges to meet Blackie, Blackie recognizes him. He agrees to give Higgins half the proceeds, but Blackie's sidekick "the Runt" informs Gloria that he will not be bringing real cash, and that the $50,000 is stashed in Arthur's home safe. Jack and an accomplice tie Blackie up. Jack then leaves to get the money. Blackie gets free, phones Farraday and heads to Arthur's suite. There, he and the Runt capture and bind Jack. Then Blackie forces Gloria to write out a confession, convincing her how coldblooded he can be by pretending to shoot her husband dead (the unseen Runt just knocks him out). Jack regains consciousness and control of the situation, allowing Gloria to burn her confession. When Farraday and his men break in, Blackie presents the inspector with a blank sheet of paper, claiming he switched the pages. Gloria incriminates herself and is arrested and taken away with her husband, Jack Higgins.

== Cast ==
- Chester Morris as Boston Blackie
- Lynn Merrick as Constance Gloria Mannard/Gloria Higgins
- Richard Lane as Inspector Farraday
- Frank Sully as Sergeant Matthews
- Steve Cochran as Jack Higgins
- George E. Stone as The Runt
- Lloyd Corrigan as Arthur Manleder
