= Jam Session (1944 film) =

1944 film directed by Charles Barton

- Directed by: Charles Barton
- Written by: Manuel Seff
- Starring: Ann Miller; Jess Barker; Charles D. Brown
- Cinematography: L. W. O'Connell
- Edited by: Richard Fantl
- Distributed by: Columbia Pictures Corporation
- Release date: April 13, 1944
- Running time: 77 minutes
- Country: United States
- Language: English

Jam Session is a 1944 American musical film starring Ann Miller.

== Plot ==
Terry Baxter is a dancer from small town Kansas, trying desperately to break into movies after traveling to Hollywood. She does everything from sneaking onto sound stages and disguising herself but she doesn't have any luck. She then meets a screenwriter who is also new to Hollywood, and she poses as his private secretary, all in an act to have access to the studio and try and see studio mogul Raymond Stuart. All her breathless attempts to see the guy get her nowhere, but when she suddenly stops two men by tap dancing for them, they try giving her a screen test, but she walks out on them because she thinks they are making fun of her. She then gets arrested after trying to break into Raymond Stuart's home. Everything is in a mess until she is freed by Raymond Stuart himself and becomes a big star.

== Cast ==
- Ann Miller as Terry Baxter
- Jess Barker as George Carter Haven
- Charles D. Brown as Raymond Stuart
- Eddie Kane as Lloyd Marley
- George Eldredge as Berkeley Bell
- Renie Riano as Ms. Tobin
- Clarence Muse as Henry
- Pauline Drake as Evelyn
- Charles La Torre as Coletti
- Anne Loos as Neva Cavendish
- Ray Walker as Fred Wylie
- Charlie Barnet and His Orchestra as Charlie Barnet Orchestra
- Louis Armstrong and His Orchestra as Louis Armstrong Orchestra
- Alvino Rey's Orchestra as Alvino Rey Orchestra
- Jan Garbar's Orchestra as Jan Garbar Orchestra
- Glen Gray & the Casa Loma Orchestra
- Nan Wynn as herself
