= Rusty (film series) =

American film series

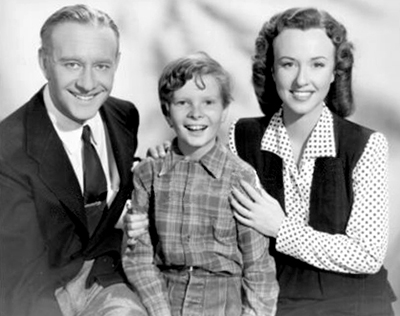
Conrad Nagel, Ted Donaldson and Margaret Lindsay in Adventures of Rusty (1945)

The Rusty film series comprises eight American films produced for young audiences between 1945 and 1949 by Columbia Pictures. Child actor Ted Donaldson starred as Danny Mitchell in the series, which relates the adventures of a German Shepherd dog named Rusty. The role of Rusty was played by Ace the Wonder Dog in the first feature, Adventures of Rusty (1945). A police dog named Rip took over the role for the second film, The Return of Rusty (1946). In the later films Rusty was played by Flame, a charismatic dog star who was featured in three separate series.

The Rusty films were B-movies, primarily shown as the second half of a double bill. The basic boy-and-his-dog stories usually addressed social issues of the era, and provided civics lessons to its young audiences.

Directors at Columbia usually broke in with the studio's "B" features. Only William Castle and John Sturges advanced from the Rusty pictures to more ambitious projects; the series was usually entrusted to low-budget specialists Lew Landers or Seymour Friedman.

Among the regular cast members was child actor David Ackles, who appeared in most of the films as Danny's cohort Tuck. Character actor John Litel joined the series with the second film. Ann Doran, a longstanding member of Columbia's stock company, took over the role of Danny's mother in the third film, and remained in the role until the series ended in 1949. Ted Donaldson had outgrown the little-boy role by then; although the teenaged Donaldson remained with the series, much of the action in the final film, Rusty's Birthday (1949), was turned over to a new little boy, Jimmy Hunt.

== Films ==
Release date	Title	Director	Length	Cast
September 6, 1945	Adventures of Rusty	Paul Burnford	69 min.	Ted Donaldson, Margaret Lindsay, Conrad Nagel, Ace the Wonder Dog
June 27, 1946	The Return of Rusty	William Castle	64 min.	Ted Donaldson, John Litel, Barbara Woodell, Rip the Police Dog
May 1, 1947	For the Love of Rusty	John Sturges	68 min.	Ted Donaldson, Tom Powers, Ann Doran, Flame
August 7, 1947	The Son of Rusty	Lew Landers	75 min.	Ted Donaldson, Tom Powers, Ann Doran, Flame
April 8, 1948	My Dog Rusty	Lew Landers	64 min.	Ted Donaldson, John Litel, Ann Doran, Flame
October 21, 1948	Rusty Leads the Way	Will Jason	58 min.	Ted Donaldson, John Litel, Ann Doran, Flame
April 8, 1949	Rusty Saves a Life	Seymour Friedman	67 min.	Ted Donaldson, John Litel, Ann Doran, Flame
November 3, 1949	Rusty's Birthday	Seymour Friedman	60 min.	Ted Donaldson, John Litel, Ann Doran, Flame
