= Harlan Briggs =

American actor (1879–1952)

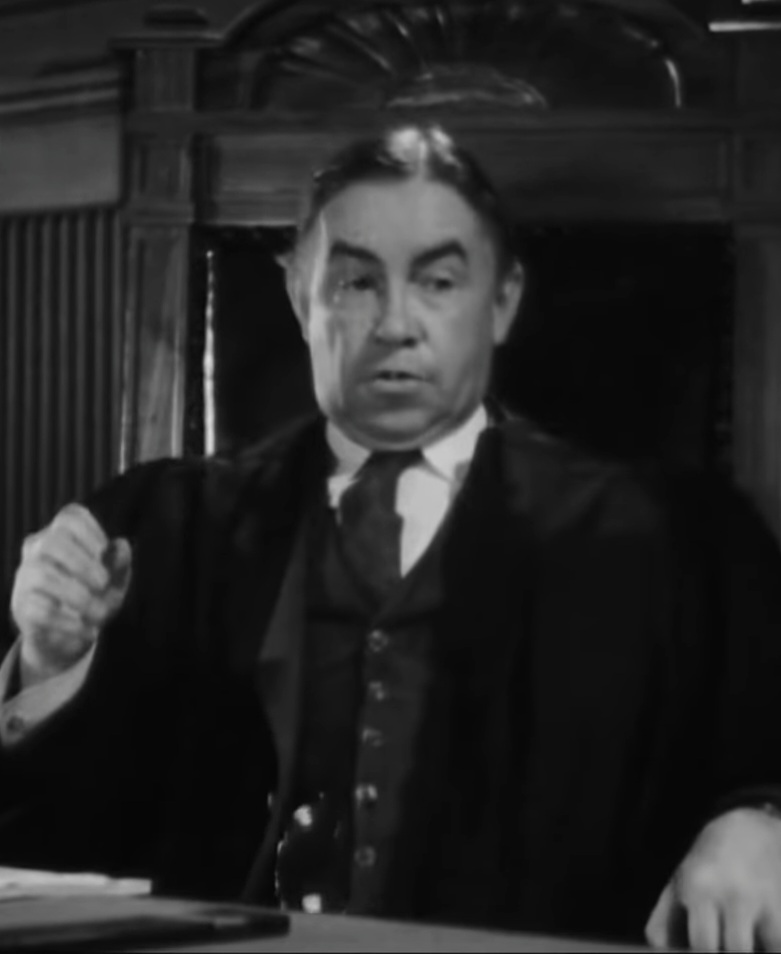
- Briggs in Made for Each Other (1939)
- Born: August 17, 1879; Blissfield, Michigan, U.S.
- Died: January 26, 1952 (aged 72); Woodland Hills, California, U.S.
- Resting place: Glen Haven Memorial Park, Los Angeles County
- Education: University of Michigan Law School
- Occupation: Actor
- Years active: 1900–1952
- Spouse: Viola Marguerite Scott (m. 1914)
- Children: 4

Harlan Briggs (August 17, 1879 – January 26, 1952) was an American actor and Vaudeville performer who was active from the 1930s until his death in 1952. During the course of his career he appeared on Broadway, in over 100 films, as well as appearing on television once towards the end of his career.

== Early life ==
Briggs was born on August 17, 1879, in Blissfield, Michigan. Although he was a graduate of the University of Michigan Law School, he chose to go into acting rather than pursue a career in law.

== Career ==
His acting career began in Vaudeville at around the beginning of the 20th century. He would make his Broadway debut in 1926, in the drama Up the Line. He worked steadily on Broadway through 1935. On August 6, 1929, he began a successful run in the featured role of G. A. Appleby in It's a Wise Child at the Belasco Theatre. In 1934 he had another featured role in the successful play, Dodsworth, as Tubby Pearson. The show opened at the Shubert Theatre on February 24, 1934, and ran for 147 performances, starring Walter Huston as Samuel Dodsworth. After a six-week hiatus, the show reopened at the Shubert on August 20 and ran for an additional 168 performances. When Samuel Goldwyn brought the rights to the play, Briggs was one of two of the original Broadway cast to reprise their roles in the film, the other being Huston in the title role. He would focus on his film career for the remainder of the 1930s, before returning to Broadway in the 1940s, combining both stage and screen performances during that decade. The most successful of his Broadway appearances in the 1940s was as Constable Small in Ramshackle Inn, which featured ZaSu Pitts in her Broadway debut.

The Story of Mary Surratt, in which Briggs appeared in 1947, was Briggs' 400th play.

His most famous role was as Dr. Stall in the 1940 comedy classic, The Bank Dick, starring W.C. Fields. Other notable films in which he appeared include: After the Thin Man (1936); Stella Dallas (1937); Having Wonderful Time (1938); The Adventures of Huckleberry Finn (1939); Mr. Smith Goes to Washington (1939); My Little Chickadee (1940); Abe Lincoln in Illinois (1940); State Fair (1945); Night and Day (1946); Little Women (1949); Goodbye, My Fancy (1951) and Carrie (1952). The last film on which Briggs worked was The Sea Hornet, which was in production in April and May 1951, and released later that year.

== Personal life ==
Briggs married actress Viola Scott on July 3, 1914. They had four sons.

== Death ==
On January 26, 1952, Briggs died in Motion Picture & Television Country House and Hospital from complications resulting from a heart attack. He was buried in Glen Haven Memorial Park in Los Angeles County, California.

== Filmography ==
(Per AFI database)

- We're in the Money (1935) as Justice of the Peace (uncredited)
- Mad Holiday (1936) as Mr. Kinney
- After the Thin Man (1936) as Burton Forrest (uncredited)
- Dodsworth (1936) as Tubby Pearson
- The Garden of Allah (1936) as American Tourist in Hotel (uncredited)
- Happy Go Lucky (1936) as U.S. Consul E.R. Brown
- Dynamite Delaney (1936)
- Marked Woman (1937) as Sad Man with Emmy Lou in Nightclub (uncredited)
- Riding on Air (1937) as Mr. Harrison
- Stella Dallas (1937) as Mr. Beamer (uncredited)
- Exclusive (1937) as Springer
- Quick Money (1937) as Thorndyke Barnsdale
- A Family Affair (1937) as Oscar Stubbins
- Easy Living (1937) as Office Manager
- Maytime (1937) as Bearded Director (uncredited)
- Beg Borrow or Steal (1937) as Mr. Virgil Miller
- That's My Story (1937) as Sheriff Allen
- Married Before Breakfast (1937) as Mr. Silas Moriarity (uncredited)
- Live, Love and Learn (1937) as Justice of The Peace
- Trouble at Midnight (1937) as Sheriff
- Behind the Mike (1937) as Sheriff
- Having Wonderful Time (1938) as Mr. Shaw
- Sing You Sinners (1938) as Customer at Gas Station (uncredited)
- A Yank at Oxford (1938) as Printer (uncredited)
- You and Me (1938) as Thomas McTavish (uncredited)
- A Man to Remember (1938) as Homer Ramsey
- Reckless Living (1938) as 'Colonel' Harris
- Meet the Girls (1938) as Ship's Captain
- One Wild Night (1938) as Mayor
- The Missing Guest (1938) as Frank Kendall - Editor
- The Adventures of Huckleberry Finn (1939) as Mr. Rucker (uncredited)
- Made for Each Other (1939) as Judge (uncredited)
- 5th Avenue Girl (1939) as Stanton - Union Representative (uncredited)
- Blondie Takes a Vacation (1939) as Mr. Holden
- Flight at Midnight (1939) as 'Pop' Hussey
- Bad Little Angel (1939) as Lem Dodd - Man in Jim's Office (uncredited)
- Mr. Smith Goes to Washington (1939) as Mr. Edwards - Howling Citizen (uncredited)
- The Mysterious Miss X (1939) as Charlie Graham
- Almost a Gentleman (1939) as Doc Rollins
- Boy Trouble (1939) as Mr. Pike
- Tell No Tales (1939) as Davie Bryant
- Cafe Society (1939) as Justice of the Peace (uncredited)
- Maisie (1939) as Deputy Sheriff Cal Hoskins
- The Man They Could Not Hang (1939) as Defense Attorney Parker (uncredited)
- Calling Dr. Kildare (1939) as James Galt
- Frontier Marshal (1939) as Editor (uncredited)
- Charlie Chan's Murder Cruise (1940) as Coroner
- Jennie (1940) as Mr. Veitch
- My Little Chickadee (1940) as Hotel Clerk (uncredited)
- The Bank Dick (1940) as Dr. Stall
- Abe Lincoln in Illinois (1940) as Denton Offut
- I Love You Again (1940) as Mayor Carver (uncredited)
- Lucky Partners (1940) as Mayor (uncredited)
- Brother Orchid (1940) as Thomas A. Bailey - Acme Paving (uncredited)
- Youth Will Be Served (1940) as Postmaster (uncredited)
- Edison, the Man (1940) as Bisbee (uncredited)
- Alias the Deacon (1940) as Sheriff Ollie (uncredited)
- Brother Rat and a Baby (1940)
- Slightly Tempted (1940) as Chief of Police Wilson (uncredited)
- The Man Who Wouldn't Talk (1940) as Foreman in Jury
- Young As You Feel (1940) as Dr. Kinsley
- Among the Living (1941) as Judge
- One Foot in Heaven (1941) as Mac MacFarland (uncredited)
- Paris Calling (1941) as Papa Picon (uncredited)
- Tennessee Johnson (1942) as Senator (uncredited)
- The Vanishing Virginian (1942) as Mr. Rogard
- The Remarkable Andrew (1942) as Sheriff Clem Watkins
- There's One Born Every Minute (1942) as Luke Simpson (uncredited)
- Lady Bodyguard (1943) as Gaston
- Conflict (1945) as Pawnbroker #2 (uncredited)
- State Fair (1945) as Food Judge (uncredited)
- The Strange Affair of Uncle Harry (1945)
- Canyon Passage (1946) as Dr. Balance (uncredited)
- Do You Love Me (1946) as Mr. Higbee (uncredited)
- It's Great to Be Young (1946)
- Magnificent Doll (1946) as Quinn (uncredited)
- My Pal Trigger (1946) as Dr. Bentley
- Mysterious Intruder (1946) as Mr. Brown
- Night and Day (1946) as Stage Doorman (uncredited)
- Personality Kid (1946) as Mr. Howard
- Rendezvous with Annie (1946) as Doorman (uncredited)
- A Stolen Life (1946) as Fisherman (uncredited)
- To Each His Own (1946) as Dr. McLaughlin (uncredited)
- Cynthia (1947) as J.M. Dingle
- Ladies' Man (1947) as Mr. Ryan (uncredited)
- The Perils of Pauline (1947) as Jake (uncredited)
- The Son of Rusty (1947) as Dr. McNamara (uncredited)
- Spoilers of the North (1947) as Salty
- Vigilantes of Boomtown (1947) as Seth—Judge (uncredited)
- A Double Life (1948) as Oscar Bernard
- Fury at Furnace Creek (1948) as Prosecutor (uncredited)
- Little Women (1949) as Old Crony at Grace's store (uncredited)
- Rusty Saves a Life (1949) as Dr. McNamara (uncredited)
- Return of the Frontiersman (1950) as Zack (uncredited)
- Goodbye, My Fancy (1951) as Janitor (scenes deleted)
- The Sea Hornet (1951) as Watchman (uncredited)
- Carrie (1952) as Joe Brant
