= Criminal lawyer (disambiguation) =

A criminal lawyer is a lawyer specializing in the defense of individuals and companies charged with criminal conduct.

Criminal lawyer may also refer to:

- Jailhouse lawyer, a criminal who gives legal advice to other criminals while incarcerated
- Prosecutor, in a criminal trial
- Criminal Lawyer (1937 film), a 1937 American drama film directed by Christy Cabanne
- Criminal Lawyer (1951 film), a 1951 film starring Pat O'Brien
