= Rusty's Birthday =

1949 film by Seymour Friedman

- Theatrical release poster
- Directed by: Seymour Friedman
- Screenplay by: Brenda Weisberg
- Based on: Based upon the characters created by Al Martin
- Produced by: Wallace MacDonald
- Starring: Ted Donaldson; John Litel; Ann Doran
- Cinematography: Henry Freulich, A.S.C.
- Edited by: James Sweeney
- Production company: Columbia Pictures
- Distributed by: Columbia Pictures
- Release date: November 3, 1949
- Running time: 61 minutes
- Country: United States
- Language: English

Rusty's Birthday is a black-and-white American juvenile drama, released by Columbia Pictures in November 1949. Structured as an hour-long second feature, it is the final entry in the eight-film low-budget series which centers on the bond between the German Shepherd dog Rusty and the boy Danny Mitchell, portrayed by Ted Donaldson. Rusty's Birthday was directed by Seymour Friedman, and also stars John Litel (who played Danny's father in five of the eight films) and Ann Doran (who played Danny's mother in six films) as his parents, Hugh and Ethel Mitchell.

== Plot ==
=== Rusty is lost and injured after performing a good deed ===
Rusty pulls the mailbox string, clamps his jaws around the letter inside and brings it into the kitchen where city legal official Hugh Mitchell is instructing his teenage son Danny on baking four rainbow trout. The burned fish wind up being offered to Rusty who also turns away from such a meal. Mrs. Mitchell returns from a trip to Chicago with a present for Rusty's upcoming birthday — a new collar. She also brings a pipe for Hugh and a briefcase for Danny who is about to start his junior year in high school. She also gives him a brochure for "Rowan - Lee Military Academy / a College Preparatory School for Young Men". Meanwhile, Rusty takes his other present, a small ball and exits into the backyard where he confronts a vagrant who then throws a wrench at him and runs to a gas station, just as a middle-aged woman drops her purse before getting into a car with her husband. As she realizes that the purse which, she tells him, contains her rings and nearly 200 dollars, is missing, Rusty is spotted running after the car to return it. As the grateful woman kisses Rusty, the vagrant who was following Rusty and the purse, steps out to claim that Rusty is his dog but, due to circumstances, would be willing to sell him. The woman gives him 25 dollars and asks the dog's name. The vagrant, already some distance away, shouts over his shoulder, "Jackpot".

Attorney Mitchell telephones to place a newspaper ad regarding Rusty's disappearance, while Danny and his four friends from the neighborhood return after an unsuccessful search. Meanwhile, as the couple who "bought" Rusty stop their car, which is pulling a trailer, Rusty runs out of the trailer and starts for home. While searching for food in the harsh countryside, he injures his paw and becomes trapped in coiled wire. A young boy named Jeff Neeley, pulling a stuffed toy dog on a string, rescues Rusty, taking him to be the personification of his imaginary dog friend "Gladly" and leads him to the campsite where his older brother Bill and unemployed sharecropper father Virgil, sitting alongside a small dilapidated truck, are cooking food from their meager supply. The Neeleys determine that because Rusty, who has no license, is limping, with one paw held in the air, they will allow him to travel with them at least until he recovers.

=== Rusty returns with a new family ===
As Danny and the four boys walk through town, they run into Miss Simmons, who runs the local employment agency and offers to add 5 dollars as her share of the reward offered for finding Rusty, just as Virgil approaches to ask her about job availability for a day laborer. Moments later, Danny and the boys spot Bill and Jeff who are sitting at the curb, next to the truck, examining Rusty's paw. During the confrontation, Jeff calls Rusty "my dog" and Danny retorts, "in a pig's eye… stealing doesn't make him yours". The next moment a motorcycle policeman arrives and takes the Neeleys, including Virgil, who has just returned from his job search, into the city's holding pen to confirm Virgil's lost registration paper for his truck. While his father and older brother are in brief detention, young Jeff is brought home for dinner by attending attorney Mitchell and, as the little boy tearfully reunites with his beloved "Gladly", Danny becomes jealous of the affection between Rusty and Jeff as well as the attention his own parents are lavishing on the boy, especially upon hearing the lullaby his mother was singing while putting Jeff to bed.

The next morning, Virgil arrives to pick up Jeff and start off on a new job search. Attorney Mitchell invites him for breakfast and presents the family an opportunity to farm a piece of property the Mitchells own nearby, while also offering to let Jeff continue to live in the house and start school. Carrie Simmons also arrives to tell Virgil that she found another job for him. Meanwhile, in the kitchen, Danny tells his mother that he has decided to attend the military academy, after all.

Later, as Bill is helping Virgil repair the cabin that will be their new living place, Miss Simmons arrives with a freshly baked pie. Bill resents "all these women trying to run us", but Virgil explains that his late mother said that "you've got to know how to receive as well as how to give". As Bill goes back to work, Virgil worriedly touches his stomach. Shortly thereafter, Bill hurriedly drives to the Mitchells' house and, with no one answering the front door, runs to the back, breaks a glass panel on the kitchen door and starts to gather ice from the freezer. Just then, Danny and his friends return, with Danny, egged on by his friends, accuses Bill of breaking in, and punches him, making Bill fall unconscious after hitting his head. As Mrs. Mitchell arrives, Bill revives and explains that his father had an appendicitis attack and needs emergency help. As calls are placed to the doctor and the hospital, everyone else leaves, but Danny remains in the house and sees a police car arrive holding the same vagrant who was chased away from the house by Rusty. Jack Wiggins, the gas station owner/attendant, explains to a gathering of locals that "…when I got back, I found this character looting the cash register". The vagrant is brought into the Mitchell house where a confrontation with Rusty makes him blurt out that he didn't steal the dog, but only sold him.

=== Danny regrets his uncharitable behavior ===
Upon hearing the story, Danny goes with Rusty to the cabin and apologizes to Bill, explaining that it should have been obvious that Rusty would have never befriended thieves and that he should have trusted Rusty's instincts. He sits down and has a heart-to-heart talk with Bill about personal feelings and the meaning of home. He invites Bill to live with the Mitchells, but Bill says that he has to go the hospital to check on his father. They leave together with Rusty. Later, as the Mitchells discuss Danny's behavior, he returns home and tells them that "Bill is a great guy" and "how wonderful it is to have a permanent address". He goes upstairs and leaves Rusty in Jeff's room. Later that night, Bill arrives with the news that his father's appendix had burst and that he is calling for Jeff to be at his bedside. Running upstairs, Danny discovers that Jeff and Rusty are gone. The Mitchells leave for the hospital, while the two boys look for Jeff. It turns out that Jeff and Rusty went to the cabin to spend the night. In the morning, Miss Simmons arrives with warm cinnamon rolls. She tells Jeff that she also pretends, but in her case, that she has a little boy, just like him. He tells her that he dreams of his real mother singing to him, because his pretend mother can't sing. Miss Simmons then cuddles him in her lap and sings to him "Beautiful Dreamer". Danny and Bill arrive at the cabin and tell Miss Simmons that Virgil is very ill. Jeff awakens and thinks that Danny came to take "Gladly" away, but Danny tells him that "Gladly" is now Jeff's dog. Later, Bill returns with the happy news that their father is better and Jeff, looking at Miss Simmons, tell him that "she can sing just like everything".

=== Rusty's offspring becomes the new "Gladly" ===
As the Mitchells came home from the hospital with the news that Virgil Neeley is out of danger, Danny offers to give up Rusty so that Jeff can have his "Gladly" and live with the Mitchells while he is at military school, his parents tell him that there is no need for any of that, since Jeff will be happy with his father and Miss Simmons, to whom "he's transferred his heart… lock, stock and barrel". Also, news from the local farm is that Rusty is a father again and one of his pups will make a perfect new "Gladly" for Jeff. It all ends with a birthday party for Rusty as Jeff hugs his new little Gladly and Mrs. Mitchell cuts Rusty's birthday cake.

== Cast ==
- Ted Donaldson as Danny, son of Hugh and Ethel Mitchell
- John Litel as attorney Hugh Mitchell
- Ann Doran as Ethel Mitchell, his wife
- Jimmy Hunt as Jeff Neeley, younger son of Virgil Neeley
- Mark Dennis as Bill Neeley, older son of Virgil Neeley
- Ray Teal as Virgil Neeley, unemployed farmworker
- Lillian Bronson as Carrie Simmons, employment agency proprietress
- and Flame as Rusty

Unbilled (in order of appearance)

- Robert B. Williams (vagrant who "sells" Rusty)
- Myron Healey (Jack Wiggins, gas station attendant)
- Teddy Infuhr (Squeaky Foley, Danny's smart-aleck friend)
- Dwayne Hickman (Nip Worden, another of Danny's four friends)
- David Ackles (Ticky Worden, also one of Danny's four friends)
- Fred Sears (policeman who checks the Neeleys' registration)
- Dorothy Vernon (townswoman)

== Taglines ==
- "RUSTY TAKES THE CAKE for his most heart-warming adventure!"
- "More troubles than even a dog can solve!"

== Regular showings on Turner Classic Movies ==
After premiering Rusty's Birthday on June 30, 2007, Turner Classic Movies has continued to present it, along with the other films in the series, at least once a year, as part of its Saturday morning schedule of series films as well as serials.
