= Mickey Kuhn =

American child actor (1932–2022)

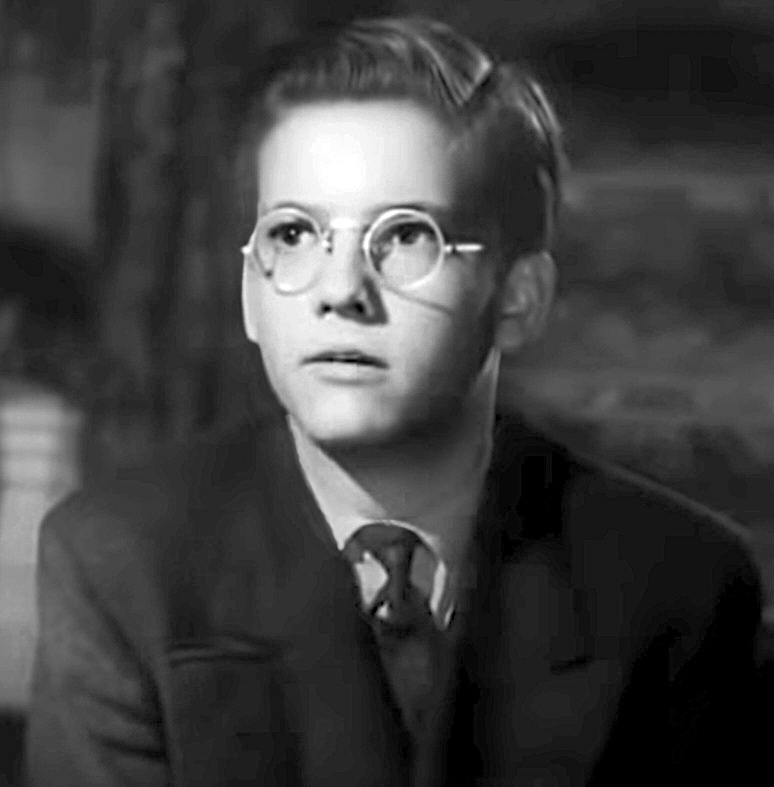
- Kuhn in The Strange Love of Martha Ivers (1946)
- Born: Theodore Matthew Michael Kuhn Jr. September 21, 1932; Waukegan, Illinois, U.S.
- Died: November 20, 2022 (aged 90); Naples, Florida, U.S.
- Occupation: Actor
- Years active: 1934–1956 (as actor)
- Spouses: Jean Marie Hannick (m. 1956; div. 1962); Shannon Farnon (divorced); Rosa Negrete (divorced); Yolanda Borbon (divorced); Barbara Traci (m. 1985)
- Children: 2 (by Hannick)

Theodore Matthew Michael Kuhn Jr. (September 21, 1932 – November 20, 2022) was an American actor. He started his career as a child actor, active on-screen during the Golden Age of Hollywood from the 1930s until the early 1950s. He is noted for having played Beau Wilkes in Gone with the Wind (1939), and also appeared in Juarez (1939), A Tree Grows in Brooklyn (1945), The Strange Love of Martha Ivers (1946), Red River (1948), Broken Arrow (1950), and A Streetcar Named Desire (1951).

== Biography ==
=== Career as a child star ===
Kuhn was born on September 21, 1932, in Waukegan, Illinois, to Theodore Matthew Michael Kuhn Sr. and Pearl Bernadette (née Hicks). He had a sister, Bernadette, who was twelve years older. In 1934, the family moved to Los Angeles as a result of the Great Depression. Kuhn appeared as a toddler in the 1934 film Change of Heart, after a woman spotted him with his mother in Santa Monica and informed her of a Fox Film casting call, believing Kuhn and the woman's toddler could play twins. His parents enrolled him at the Mar-Ken School for performing children, where he became friends with acting brothers Darryl and Dwayne Hickman.

Kuhn considered Juarez (1939) his "big break", having been chosen from more than 50 children for the role. Afterwards, he was selected for the role of Beau Wilkes in Gone with the Wind, recalling that the receptionist at the casting call told him "Mickey, we've been waiting for you", and instantly announced the role had been filled. Kuhn went on to appear as the adoptive son of John Wayne's character in Red River in 1948 and then in Broken Arrow in 1950 starring James Stewart.

The film A Streetcar Named Desire (1951) reunited him with Vivien Leigh twelve years after they first worked together in Gone with the Wind. In A Streetcar Named Desire, Kuhn played a sailor who directs Leigh's character Blanche to the correct streetcar which will take her to her sister's neighborhood at the beginning of the film. He therefore achieved the distinction of being the only actor to share screen time with Leigh in each of her Academy Award-winning performances, and following the death of Dame Olivia de Havilland on July 26, 2020, he became the last surviving credited cast member in both films.

=== Navy career ===
Kuhn served in the U.S. Navy from 1951 until 1955 and worked as an aircraft electrician there.

=== Post-acting career ===
After finishing his Navy service, Kuhn attempted to return to acting, briefly appearing in the TV anthology Alfred Hitchcock Presents, but was only offered television roles which he found unappealing. He left the film business in 1956 to attend college, and worked for American Airlines from 1965 to 1995 and the Boston airport in administrative positions until his retirement. He regularly visited film festivals dealing with his films.

Kuhn was married five times. His first marriage, to Jean Marie Hannick, lasted from 1956 until 1962; they had two children, including son Theodore Matthew Michael III. He was later married to Shannon Farnon, Rosa Negrete, and Yolanda Borbon, all of which ended in divorce. His last wife, an American Airlines co-worker named Barbara Traci, was married to him from 1985 until his death.

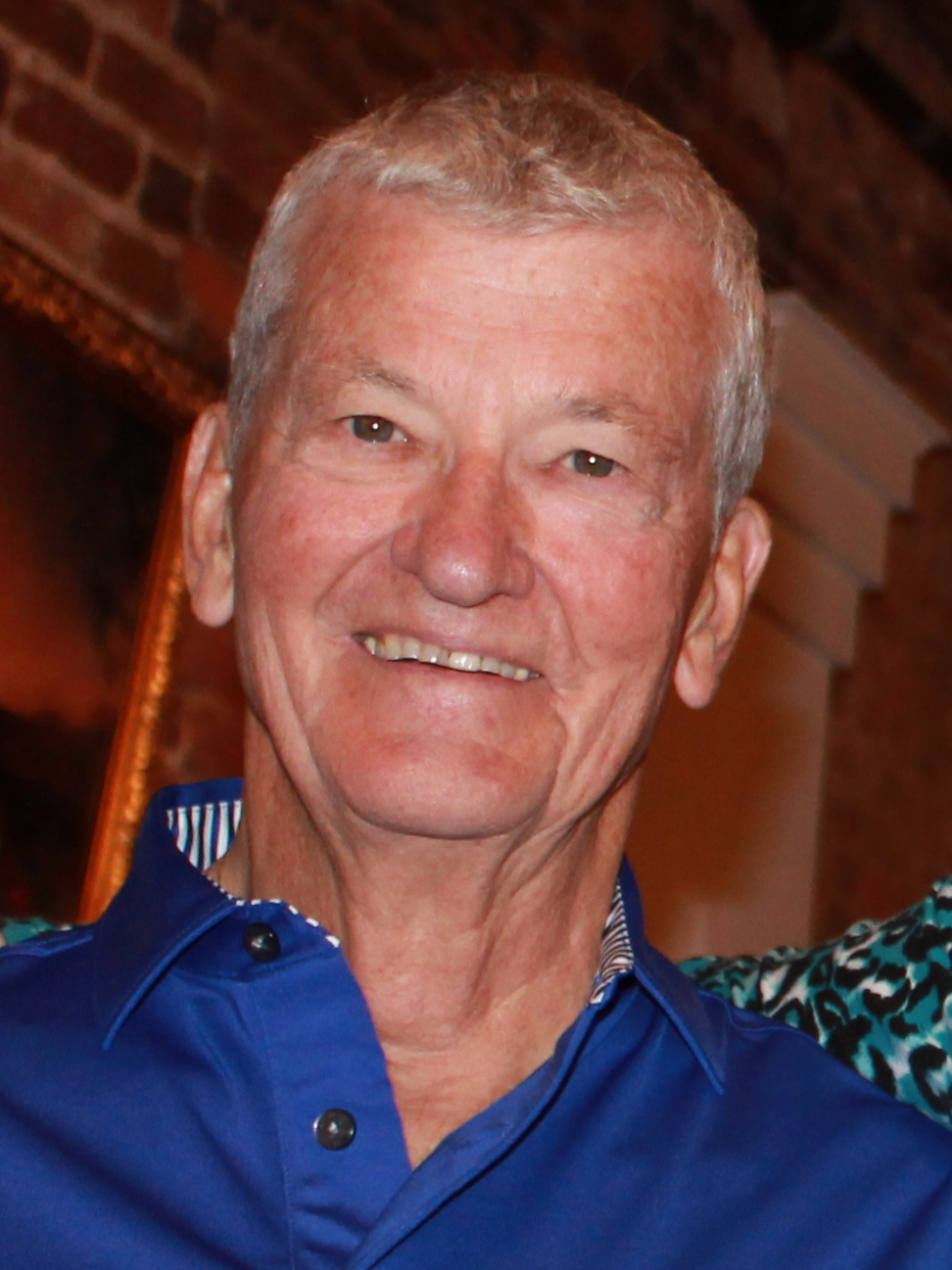
Kuhn in 2013

=== Death ===
Kuhn had been living in Naples, Florida, and volunteered four hours per week at a local hospital. He died at a hospice facility in Naples on November 20, 2022, at the age of 90.

== Awards ==
In 2005, Kuhn received a Golden Boot Award, an award given to acknowledge significant contributions to the Western genre.

== Filmography ==
Year	Title	Role	Source
1934	Change of Heart	Baby (film debut)	
1937	A Doctor's Diary	Boy in hospital	
1939	King of the Underworld	Young Boy	
1939	Juarez	Agustín de Iturbide y Green	
1939	S.O.S. Tidal Wave	Buddy Shannon	
1939	When Tomorrow Comes	Boy	
1939	Bad Little Angel	Bobby Creighton – Age 5 (uncredited)	
1939	Gone with the Wind	Beau Wilkes	
1940	I Want a Divorce	David Holland, Jr.	
1940	Slightly Tempted	Boy (uncredited)	
1941	One Foot in Heaven	Boy (uncredited)	
1944	Beneath Western Skies	Teddy (uncredited)	
1945	Roughly Speaking	John	
1945	A Tree Grows in Brooklyn	Boy	
1945	This Love of Ours	Boy	
1945	Dick Tracy	Junior	
1946	Roaring Rangers	Larry Connor	
1946	The Strange Love of Martha Ivers	Young Walter	
1946	The Searching Wind	Sam as a Boy	
1946	The Return of Rusty	Marty Connors	
1946	Three Little Girls in Blue	Farm boy	
1947	High Conquest	Peter Oberwalder Jr.	
1947	Magic Town	Hank Nickleby	
1948	Red River	Young Matt	
1949	Scene of the Crime	Ed Monigan, Jr.	
1950	Broken Arrow	Bob Slade (uncredited)	
1951	That's My Boy	Student (uncredited)	
1951	A Streetcar Named Desire	A Sailor	
1951	On the Loose	Bob Vance	
1955	The Last Frontier	Luke	
1956	Away All Boats	Seaman (final film)	
1957	Alfred Hitchcock Presents	Bellhop	Season 2 Episode 22: "The End of Indian Summer"
1957	Alfred Hitchcock Presents	Ellerbee	Season 2 Episode 23: "One for the Road" (credited but does not appear)
1957	Alfred Hitchcock Presents		Season 2 Episode 29: "Vicious Circle"

== General and cited references ==
- Goldrup, Tom and Jim (2002). Growing Up on the Set: Interviews with 39 Former Child Actors of Film and Television. McFarland & Co. pp. 178–185. ISBN 1476613702.
- Holmstrom, John (1996). The Moving Picture Boy: An International Encyclopaedia from 1895 to 1995. Norwich: Michael Russell, p. 178.
