= Dwayne Hickman =

American actor (1934–2022)

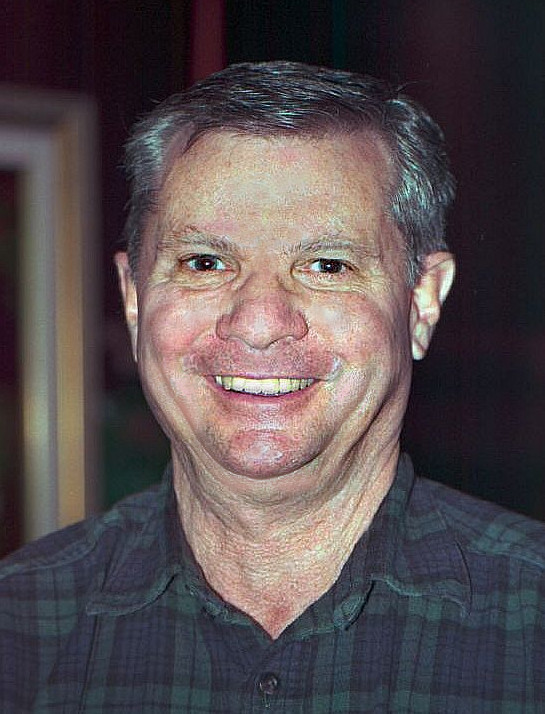
- Born: Dwayne Bernard Hickman; May 18, 1934; Los Angeles, California, U.S.
- Died: January 9, 2022 (aged 87); Los Angeles, California, U.S.
- Education: Loyola Marymount University
- Occupations: Actor; television executive; producer; director
- Years active: 1942–2005
- Spouses: Carol Christensen (m. 1963; div. 1972) Joanne Purtle Papile (m. 1977; div. 1981) Joan Roberts (m. 1983)
- Children: 2
- Relatives: Darryl Hickman (brother)
- Website: dwaynehickman.com

Dwayne Bernard Hickman (May 18, 1934 – January 9, 2022) was an American actor and television executive, producer and director, who worked as an executive at CBS and had also briefly recorded as a vocalist. Hickman portrayed Chuck MacDonald, Bob Collins's girl-crazy teenaged nephew, in the 1950s The Bob Cummings Show and the title character in the 1960s sitcom The Many Loves of Dobie Gillis. He was the younger brother of actor Darryl Hickman, with whom he appeared on screen. After retirement, he devoted his time to creating personalized paintings.

== Early life ==
Born in Los Angeles, on May 18, 1934, Hickman was the younger brother of child actor Darryl Hickman and the older brother of Deidre Hickman. His father, Milton, sold insurance and his mother, Katherine Louise (née Ostertag), was a housewife. His maternal grandfather, Louis Henry Ostertag, was a U.S. Navy seaman on Commodore George Dewey's flagship, the cruiser USS Olympia (C-6), and present at the Battle of Manila Bay on May 1, 1898, for which he was awarded the Dewey Medal by Act of Congress.

Hickman graduated from Cathedral High School in 1952 and intended to become a Passionist priest, but ultimately chose not to become a priest and attended Loyola Marymount University.

== Acting career ==
Hickman's first screen appearances were as an extra in The Grapes of Wrath (1940) and Men of Boys Town (1941), in which his brother Darryl was featured. Other early screen appearances were in the 1942 Our Gang comedy Melodies Old and New, Captain Eddie (1945), The Hoodlum Saint (1946), and Faithful in My Fashion (1946).

In 1946, Hickman played young Chase in the movie The Secret Heart which starred Claudette Colbert, Walter Pidgeon, Lionel Barrymore, and June Allyson.

Hickman played different small roles in some of Columbia Pictures' eight-film "Rusty" series, about a boy and his valiant German Shepherd: The Return of Rusty (1946), For the Love of Rusty (1947), The Son of Rusty (1947), My Dog Rusty (1948), Rusty Leads the Way (1948), Rusty's Birthday (1949), and Rusty Saves a Life (1949).

Heaven Only Knows (1947), in which he appeared, starred Bob Cummings, who would play a major role in Hickman's career. Hickman also appeared in Her Husband's Affairs (1948), The Boy with Green Hair (1948), The Sun Comes Up (1949), Mighty Joe Young (1949), and The Happy Years (1950), which starred Darryl. As teens, Dwayne and Darryl guest-starred in a 1950 episode of The Lone Ranger titled "Two Gold Lockets".

Hickman focused on his studies for a few more years, then returned to acting with appearances in Public Defender, The Loretta Young Show, Lux Video Theatre, and Waterfront. In 1955, Dwayne appeared in another Lone Ranger episode, titled "Sunstroke Mesa".

=== The Bob Cummings Show ===
Hickman gained wide notice as Chuck on The Bob Cummings Show from 1955 to 1959. At the time, he was studying at Loyola Marymount. Hickman was one of the early stars to have a breakout character in the series.

Hickman considered Cummings a childhood television hero and had said that Cummings taught him everything he knew about acting. He worked with and was friends with Cummings throughout five seasons.

While still on The Bob Cummings Show, Hickman guest-starred on other shows, such as The Adventures of Ozzie and Harriet and Men of Annapolis (alongside his brother). He also had a sizable film role in Rally 'Round the Flag, Boys! (1958).

=== The Many Loves of Dobie Gillis ===
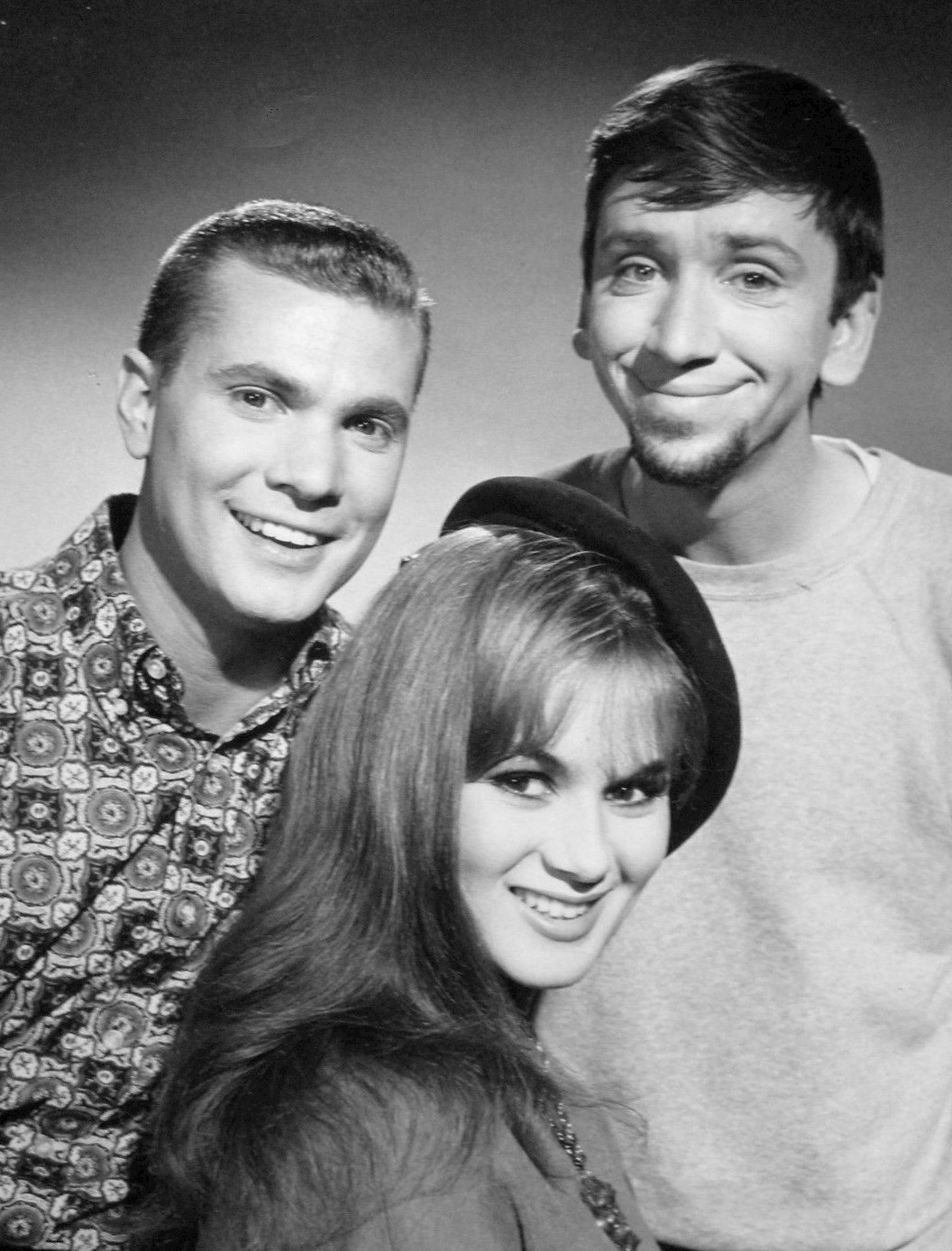
Hickman with co-stars Bob Denver and Danielle De Metz in a 1960 publicity shot for The Many Loves of Dobie Gillis

In 1958, Hickman was cast as the lead of The Many Loves of Dobie Gillis, which aired from 1959 to 1963. At the show's debut, the Dobie character was a teenager in high school, and Hickman was then 24 years old.

He played Dobie for four years (with fellow former Loyola student Bob Denver as his sidekick Maynard G. Krebs).

During the series' run, Hickman did the voice for Aladdin in 1001 Arabian Nights (1959). On June 23, 1960, Hickman appeared on The Ford Show, Starring Tennessee Ernie Ford.

=== Post–Dobie Gillis ===
When Dobie Gillis ended, Hickman found himself stereotyped as a "youngster" when he was too old for such roles.

He and Annette Funicello appeared together in an episode of the drama The Greatest Show on Earth, starring Jack Palance. He also guest-starred on Valentine's Day, Vacation Playhouse and Wagon Train.

In 1965, Hickman appeared in the comedy film Cat Ballou with Jane Fonda and Lee Marvin.

=== American International Pictures ===
Hickman signed a multi-picture deal with American International Pictures. For that studio he starred in Ski Party (1965) opposite Frankie Avalon; How to Stuff a Wild Bikini (1965) with Funicello; and Dr Goldfoot and the Bikini Machine (1965) with Avalon and Vincent Price. He also made a cameo in Sergeant Deadhead (1965).

=== Television guest appearances ===
Hickman appeared in the episode "Run Sheep Run" on Combat! as a soldier who froze during an attack by a German machine gun nest.

He had a supporting part in the 1967 comedy Doctor, You've Got to Be Kidding!. He starred in the 1967 pilot for We'll Take Manhattan and the 1968 pilot for Missy's Men, but neither was picked up for broadcast.

Hickman also appeared as a guest panelist on Match Game in 1975.

He guest-starred on Vacation Playhouse; Ironside; Insight; The Flying Nun; My Friend Tony; Walt Disney's Wonderful World of Color ("My Dog, the Thief"); Mod Squad; Love, American Style; Karen; Kolchak: The Night Stalker; Perry Mason; and Ellery Queen. He reprised his most famous role in Whatever Happened to Dobie Gillis?, a one-shot pilot, and appeared in the TV movie Don't Push, I'll Charge When I'm Ready (1977).

== Later career ==
Hickman found his future in entertainment behind the scenes, becoming involved in production roles. From 1977 to 1988, Hickman served as a programming executive at CBS. He took time out for a cameo in the TV movie High School U.S.A. (1983).

Hickman reprised his role of Dobie in the TV movie Bring Me the Head of Dobie Gillis (1988). His autobiography is titled Forever Dobie. That year, he guest-starred on Win, Lose or Draw.

In the late 1980s, Hickman turned to directing episodic TV, doing episodes of Duet; Charles in Charge; Open House; Designing Women; Get a Life; Head of the Class; Harry and the Hendersons; and Sister, Sister.

He still occasionally acted, appearing in Murder, She Wrote, and A Night at the Roxbury (1998). He had a semi-regular role on the TV series Clueless.

He could be seen in Surviving Gilligan's Island: The Incredibly True Story of the Longest Three Hour Tour in History and Angels with Angles (2005).

== Personal life and death ==
Hickman was married three times. His first two marriages, to Carol Christensen and Joanne Papile, ended in divorce. He and his third wife, Joan Roberts, were married for 39 years until his death. He had two sons, one from his first marriage and one from his third.

Hickman died from complications of Parkinson's disease in Los Angeles on January 9, 2022, at the age of 87.
