= Brenda Weisberg =

Russian-American screenwriter

- Born: Goldie Weisberg; April 6, 1900; Rovno, Volhynian Governorate, Russian Empire
- Died: May 1996 (aged 96); Phoenix, Arizona, United States
- Occupation: Screenwriter

Brenda Weisberg (1900–1996) was a Russian-American screenwriter active from the late 1930s through the early 1950s. Her body of work spanned a wide range of genres, from monster movies to thrillers to family films. She wrote several films for the Rusty the Dog and Dead End Kids series.

== Biography ==
Brenda was born in Rovno, Ukraine, to a Jewish family; she emigrated to Ohio with her parents when she was a little girl. The family eventually settled in Phoenix, Arizona. After graduating high school, she began working for local publications, and eventually founded the city's first Jewish newspaper, The Southwestern Jewish Star.

She eventually moved to Hollywood around 1940, where she began writing genres films for big studios like Universal, RKO, and Columbia. Her credits include films like The Mummy's Ghost, Weird Woman, My Dog Rusty, and There's One Born Every Minute.

She retired from screenwriting in 1952, the year she moved back to Phoenix, Arizona, and married her husband, Morris Meckler. In her later years, she became active in the local arts scene, working with the Phoenix Little Theatre as a writer, director, and actor. In 1988, she published a book about her life called Papa Was a Farmer.

== Selected screenplays ==
- Girls' School (1950)
- Rusty's Birthday (1949)
- Rusty Saves a Life (1949)
- Port Said (1948)
- My Dog Rusty (1948)
- When a Girl's Beautiful (1947)
- King of the Wild Horses (1947)
- Alias Mr. Twilight (1946)
- Shadowed (1946)
- Ding Dong Williams (1946)
- China Sky (1945)
- The Mummy's Ghost (1944)
- Weird Woman (1944)
- The Mad Ghoul (1943)
- Keep 'Em Slugging (1943)
- Mug Town (1942)
- Overland Mail (1942)
- There's One Born Every Minute (1942)
- Tough as They Come (1942)
- You're Telling Me (1942)
- Mob Town (1941)
- Sing Another Chorus (1941)
- Hit the Road (1941)
- You're Not So Tough (1940)
- Little Tough Guy (1938)
