= Personality Kid =

1946 film directed by George Sherman

- Directed by: George Sherman
- Written by: Cromwell McKechnie; Lewis Helmer Herman; William Sackheim
- Produced by: Wallace MacDonald
- Starring: Anita Louise; Michael Duane; Ted Donaldson
- Cinematography: Henry Freulich
- Edited by: Richard Fantl
- Music by: Mischa Bakaleinikoff
- Production company: Columbia Pictures
- Distributed by: Columbia Pictures
- Release date: August 8, 1946
- Running time: 67 minutes
- Country: United States
- Language: English

Personality Kid is a 1946 American adventure drama film directed by George Sherman and starring Anita Louise, Michael Duane and Ted Donaldson. It was produced and distributed by Columbia Pictures. The film's sets were designed by the art director Cary Odell.

== Cast ==
- Anita Louise as Laura Howard
- Michael Duane as Harry Roberts
- Ted Donaldson as Davey Roberts
- Barbara Brown as Mrs. Roberts
- Bobby Larson as Albert Partridge
- Oscar O'Shea as Officer O'Brien
- Harlan Briggs as Mr. Howard
- Regina Wallace as Mrs. Partridge
- Edythe Elliott as Mrs. Howard
- Martin Garralaga as Melendez
- Paul Maxey as Mr. Partridge
