= Whitford Kane =

American actor

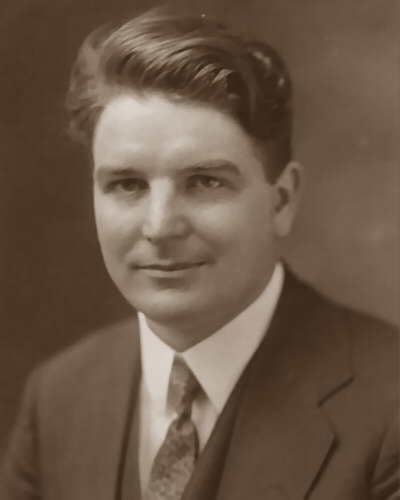
- NYPL Digital Gallery
- Born: Thomas Wheeler Kane; January 30, 1881; Larne, Ireland
- Died: December 17, 1956 (aged 75); New York City, U.S.
- Occupations: Actor, Drama Teacher
- Years active: 1900s-1954

Whitford Kane (born Thomas Wheeler Kane, January 30, 1881 – December 17, 1956) was a noted Irish-born American stage and screen character actor remembered for playing the First Gravedigger in numerous productions of Shakespeare's Hamlet and by the students that attended his drama classes over a career that spanned nearly six decades. By the end of his long career, Whitford Kane's theatre credits had grown to fill three columns in John Parker's Who's Who in the Theatre.

== Biography ==
Kane was born on January 30, 1881, in Larne, a seaport on the east coast of County Antrim, Ireland, to Dr. John Kane and the former Isabella Whiteford. He first took to the stage in Belfast while in his early 20s, and by 1910 was performing on the London stage. Kane's first known Broadway performance, the idle inventor, Daniel Murray, in Rutherford Mayne's comedy, The Drone, came in 1912, the year he immigrated to America. He would go on to be involved in some fifty-six Broadway productions over a near fifty-three year acting career that only closed due to illness as he neared the end of his life.

Kane typically played character roles often described as likable and benign. Theatre critic Brooks Atkinson wrote of Kane's performance as Dr. Wilson in John Steinbeck's 1942 play, The Moon Is Down, "As the benign village doctor, Whitford Kane, one of the best pipe-smokers on the stage, presides in cheerful humor." He played the First Gravedigger in 23 productions of Hamlet, supporting such actors as John Barrymore, Maurice Evans, Walter Hampden and Godfrey Tearle. When asked why he played in so many Shakespearean productions, Kane replied, "It's saved my bacon a good many times. The old gravedigger has fed me better than any other part. I earn my eats by Shakespeare; thank God it's always coming up."

Whitford Kane appeared in a handful of films over the 1930s and 40s, the most memorable probably being The Adventures of Mark Twain (1944) starring Fredric March, and the 1947 film The Ghost and Mrs. Muir, in which he played the publisher Mr. Sproule. His career extended into the early years of television where the "round little man with a plum for a nose, a plump chin and ruddy full-blown cheeks" was one Christmas Eve called upon to play Santa Claus. Kane was a member of the cast that appeared in the very early NBC 1939 Teleplay, The Streets of New York and the 1954 Hallmark Hall of Fame production of King Richard II that was adapted for television by Maurice Evans.

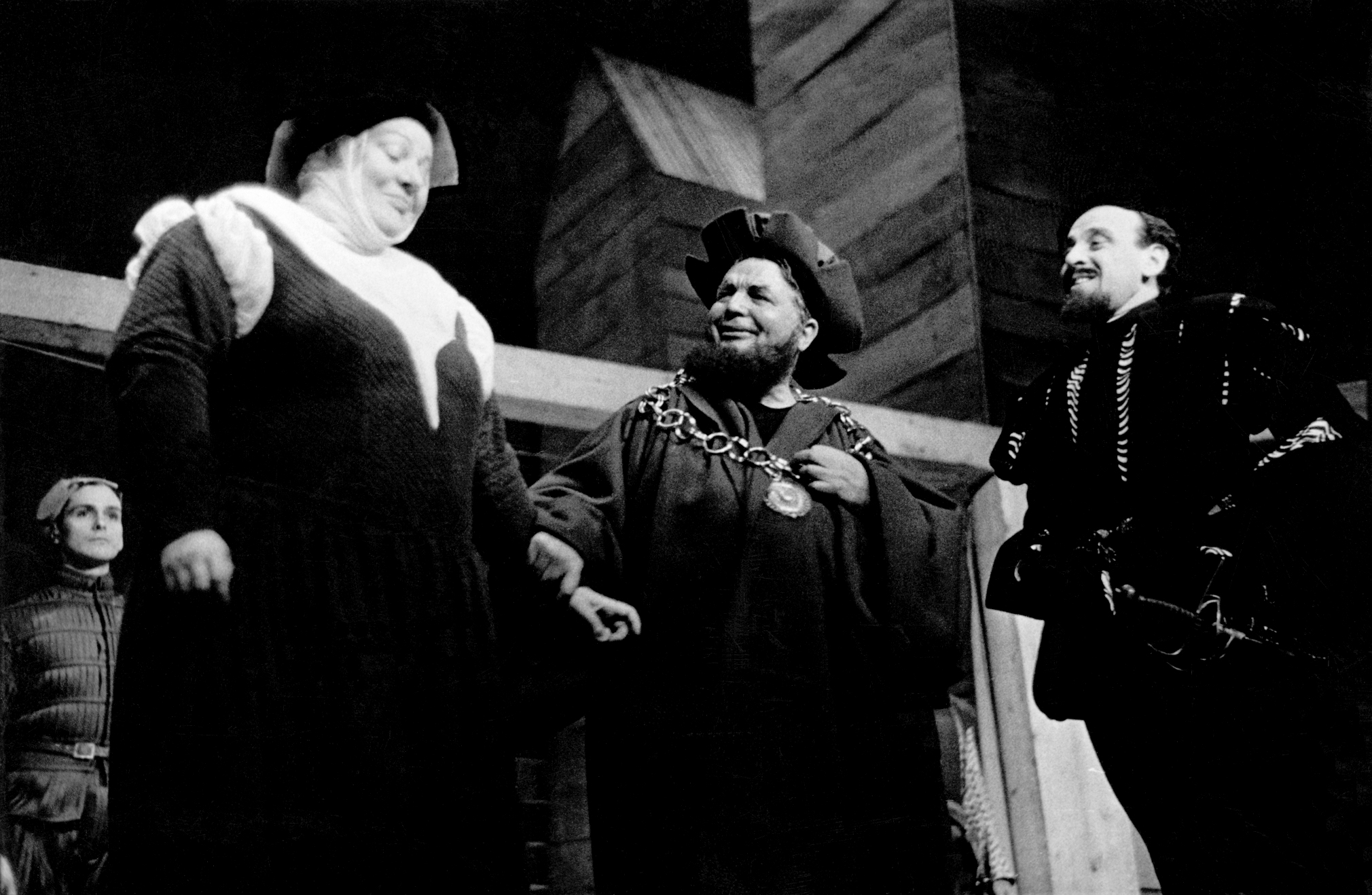
Marian Warring-Manley as Margery, Whitford Kane as Simon Eyre, and George Coulouris as the King in the Mercury Theatre production of The Shoemaker's Holiday (1938)

For a good number of years, Kane trained young actors for the stage at the Goodman Theatre in Chicago and later in New York with the Neighborhood Playhouse School of the Theatre. As director of the Goodman Theatre, Kane once awarded a young Orson Welles a drama prize. Some years later the two developed a close friendship with Kane becoming a key member of Welles's Mercury Theatre repertory company.

Kane's final Broadway performance came early in 1956 as Samuel in Seán O'Casey's drama, Roses for You, before closing out his career that summer at the American Shakespeare Theatre in Stratford, Connecticut. By then, Kane was struggling with cancer, but refused to cut back on his commitments in order to preserve his record of only missing one performance in over fifty years of theatre work. Whitford Kane died at the age of 75 on December 17, 1956, in New York City. He was survived by a brother and sister and his partner of over 25 years, actor Hiram Sherman.

A few days after his passing, actor Will Geer wrote in a letter to The New York Times Drama Editor, "Whitford Kane was an expert teacher and had a following as stout as any 'studio' of the day. For fifty years he taught that an actor's warmth must burst through the proscenium arch. Sometimes he would gallop into the parlors with such Christmas horseplay as 'St. George and the Dragon.' For he was always ready to tilt at sham or tinsel in the theatre of life. I can hear him today; Yes Virginia Rouns Patrick Dennis Tanner, there is a real Auntie Mame."

Whitford Kane published his autobiography Are we all met? in 1931.

== Filmography ==
Year	Title	Role	Notes
1934	Hide-Out	Henry Miller	
1944	The Adventures of Mark Twain	Joe Goodwin - Editor	
1947	The Ghost and Mrs. Muir	Sproule - London Publisher	Uncredited
1947	Joe Palooka in the Knockout	Max Steele	
1948	The Judge Steps Out	Dr. Charles P. Boyd	
1948	My Dog Rusty	Joshua Michael Tucker	
1948	Who Killed Doc Robbin	'Fix-it' Dan Cameron	
1948	The Walls of Jericho	Judge Foster	Uncredited
