= The Return of Rusty =

1946 film by William Castle

- Directed by: William Castle
- Written by: Lewis Helmer Herman; William Sackheim
- Produced by: Leonard S. Picker
- Starring: Ted Donaldson; John Litel; Mark Dennis
- Cinematography: Philip Tannura
- Edited by: James Sweeney
- Production company: Columbia Pictures
- Distributed by: Columbia Pictures
- Release date: June 27, 1946
- Running time: 64 minutes
- Country: United States
- Language: English

The Return of Rusty is a 1946 American drama film directed by William Castle and starring Ted Donaldson, John Litel and Mark Dennis. It was the second in the eight part Rusty film series produced by Columbia Pictures.

== Cast ==
- Ted Donaldson as Danny Mitchell
- John Litel as Hugh Mitchell
- Mark Dennis as Loddy Bicek
- Barbara Wooddell as Mrs. Mitchell
- Robert Kellard as Sgt. Jack Beals
- Mickey Kuhn as Marty Connors
- Teddy Infuhr as Herbie
- Dwayne Hickman as Bobby
- Mickey McGuire as Porky
- Gene Collins as Motor policeman
- David Ackles as Peanuts
- Donald Davis as Trailer boy
- Pat O'Malley as Immigration Officer

== Bibliography ==
- Blottner, Gene. Columbia Pictures Movie Series, 1926-1955: The Harry Cohn Years. McFarland, 2011.
