= Almost a Gentleman (1939 film) =

1939 film directed by Leslie Goodwins

- Theatrical poster
- Directed by: Leslie Goodwins; J. Dewey Starkey (assistant)
- Screenplay by: David Silverstein; Jo Pagano
- Story by: Harold Shumate
- Produced by: Cliff Reid
- Starring: James Ellison; Helen Wood; Robert Kent
- Cinematography: J. Roy Hunt
- Edited by: Desmond Marquette
- Music by: Frank Tours
- Production company: RKO Radio Pictures
- Release date: March 31, 1939 (US)
- Running time: 64 minutes
- Country: United States
- Language: English

Almost a Gentleman is a 1939 American drama film directed by Leslie Goodwins from a screenplay by David Silverstein and Jo Pagano, based on the story by Harold Shumate. The film stars James Ellison, Helen Wood and Robert Kent. It was released by RKO Radio Pictures on March 31, 1939.

== Plot ==
After his new wife's family convinces her to leave him, attorney Dan Preston leaves his law practice and sets off to travel around the country as a vagabond. When he returns home he finds his house rented by a novelist, Shirley Haddon. He adopts a mongrel dog, Picardy Max, and sets out to avenge himself against his ex-wife's family by entering Max into dog shows to compete against their pedigreed animals. Preston also begins a romantic relationship with Haddon.

Robert Mabrey, Preston's ex-brother-in-law, takes great stock in his dog winning the competition, and when he learns that Max is quite impressive in his training, he begins to get a bit concerned. When a local bully is killed by a wild animal, Mabrey sees an opportunity to rid himself of the competition, and blames the attack on Max. Faced with the impending execution of the dog, Preston resumes his legal robes and defends the dog in court. During the hearing it is discovered that the man was killed by an escaped wildcat from a visiting circus, and Max is vindicated.

When Marian Mabrey, Preston's ex-wife, is kidnapped, Max tracks the culprits down and she is saved by Preston and Max. Preston and Robert Mabrey reconcile, and Preston and Haddon begin a life together.

== Cast ==
- James Ellison as Dan Preston
- Helen Wood as Shirley Haddon
- Robert Kent as Robert Mabrey
- June Clayworth as Marian Mabrey
- Robert Warwick as Major Mabrey
- Leonard Penn as Arthur
- John Wray as Crack Williams
- Brandon Tynan as Jason Troop
- Earle Hodgins as Ira Willis
- Harlan Briggs as Doc Rollins
- Ace the Wonder Dog as Picardy Max
- Paul Fix as Kidnapper

== Production ==
The film's original title was Picardy Max, the name of the dog in the picture. This was the third film which featured Ace, the Wonder Dog; the first two were Blind Alibi (1938), and The Rookie Cop (1939). In August 1938, Picardy Max was one of twelve films which were set to shortly begin production for RKO, and Variety reported that production on the film would begin on September 7, 1938. In October, Chester Morris was attached to the picture, although he did not appear in the final version. In November, it was reported that RKO had signed Ellison to a contract, and the following month it was announced he had been selected to play the lead in Picardy Max. At the same time it was revealed that the story would be penned by Harold Shumate, and Leslie Goodwins would direct under the production of Cliff Reid. Even though production was scheduled to begin in September, it was delayed, and Variety announced in December that it would begin filming in January. Production on the picture began in the first week of January 1939, and lasted through the end of February.

In February, Variety reported that the title of the film was changed from Picardy Max, to Almost a Gentleman, and the premier date was set for March 31. In mid-March the National Legion of Decency classified the film as suitable all audiences, Class A-I. The film was released on March 31, 1939. The film was released in the U.K. under the title Magnificent Outcast.

== Response ==
The Film Bulletin did not speak highly of the film, calling it "feeble", and of "negligible entertainment value". The magazine claimed the plot and acting were both amateurish with "practically nothing to offer". Variety also did not give the film a positive review, calling it "dull" and saying the only saving grace for the film was the performance of Ace. The National Board of Review selected the film as one of its picks for suitability for both family and juvenile audiences. Harrison's Reports gave the picture a lukewarm reception, calling it "...suitable mostly for those who enjoy pictures about dogs." They found the lead unsympathetic, but blamed that on the script, for they found his romance with Wood "pleasant." Motion Picture Daily said, "The world's people are of two kinds with reference to dogs. Some like them and some don't. This, like all dog pictures, is for those who do." Outside of the scenes which showcased Ace, they felt the film was simply routine.
