= Happy Go Lucky (1936 film) =

1936 film by Aubrey Scotto

- Theatrical release poster
- Directed by: Aubrey Scotto
- Screenplay by: Olive Cooper
- Story by: Endre Bohem; Raymond L. Schrock; Eric Taylor; Wellyn Totman
- Produced by: Nat Levine
- Starring: Phil Regan; Evelyn Venable; Jed Prouty; William Newell; Jonathan Hale; Harlan Briggs
- Cinematography: Ernest Miller
- Edited by: Archie Marshek
- Music by: Karl Hajos
- Production company: Republic Pictures
- Distributed by: Republic Pictures
- Release date: December 14, 1936
- Running time: 69 minutes
- Country: United States
- Language: English

Happy Go Lucky is a 1936 American musical film directed by Aubrey Scotto and written by Olive Cooper. The film stars Phil Regan, Evelyn Venable, Jed Prouty, William Newell, Jonathan Hale and Harlan Briggs. The film was released on December 14, 1936, by Republic Pictures.

== Cast ==
- Phil Regan as John L. 'Happy Jack' Cole / Bill Lyons
- Evelyn Venable as Mary Gorham
- Jed Prouty as Charles Gorham
- William Newell as Charlie Davis
- Jonathan Hale as J. Lansing Bennett
- Harlan Briggs as U.S. Consul E.R. Brown
- Stanley Andrews as Capt. Matzdorf
- Claude King as Col. Wallis
- Carleton Young as Al
- Karl Hackett as Porozzi
- Guy Kingsford as Joe
- Howard Hickman as Dr. Wilson
- Willie Fung as Coolie Fisherman
