= Ann Doran =

American actress (1911–2000)

- Doran in 1938
- Born: Ann Lee Doran; July 28, 1911; Amarillo, Texas, U.S.
- Died: September 19, 2000 (aged 89); Carmichael, California, U.S.
- Occupation: Actress
- Years active: 1922–1988
- Mother: Rose Allen

Ann Doran (July 28, 1911 – September 19, 2000) was an American character actress, who worked in more than 1500 motion pictures and television episodes. Today's audiences know her as Carol Stark, the mother of James "Jim" Stark (James Dean) in Rebel Without a Cause (1955), and as a featured actress in short comedies with The Three Stooges and Charley Chase. She was an early member of the Screen Actors Guild and served on the board of the Motion Picture & Television Fund for 30 years.

== Early years ==
Ann Lee Doran was born in Amarillo, Texas to silent-film actress Rose Allen (born Carrie A. Barnett) and John R. Doran. She attended high school in San Bernardino, California. While attending San Bernardino High School, she was highly involved in student life and even ran a campaign for student body president before graduating in 1929. To further her education, she attended San Bernardino Valley College, where she showcased her burgeoning theatrical talents by starring as the female lead in a 1930 production of The Rivals. Driven by an interest in mathematics, Doran continued her higher education by studying the subject at both the University of Southern California and the University of California, Los Angeles before transitioning into full-time adult acting roles.

== Film career ==
According to a 1979 interview, the actress made her debut at 11 years old. Seldom cast in leading roles, Doran appeared in more than 500 motion pictures and 1,000 episodes of television series, such as the American Civil War drama Gray Ghost.

Doran entered the field of motion pictures as a stand-in, then bit player, then incidental supporting player. In 1936 she was featured in two of the last feature films produced by independent studio Chesterfield Pictures, Missing Girls and Red Lights Ahead (the latter film a rare lead for Columbia Pictures' short-subject star Andy Clyde).

Beyond her busy Hollywood career, Doran was a devout Roman Catholic who attended church regularly and devoted much time to charity work. Politically, she was a conservative Republican. She was a member of the Motion Picture Alliance for the Preservation of American Ideals, the Hollywood Republican Committee, and the Bel-Air Republican Women's Group. Throughout the mid-to-late 20th century, Doran stepped behind the scenes to support the party's traditionalist wing, providing public endorsements and organizational backing to the presidential campaigns of Thomas E. Dewey, Dwight D. Eisenhower, Barry Goldwater, Richard Nixon, Gerald Ford, and Ronald Reagan.

== Columbia Pictures ==
Red Lights Ahead led to a contract with Columbia, where Doran became a familiar face. Columbia's company policy was to use the members of its stock company as often as possible. Thus, Doran appears in Columbia's serials (such as The Spider's Web and Flying G-Men), B features (including the Blondie, Five Little Peppers and Ellery Queen series), and major feature films. She became a favorite of Columbia director Frank Capra and appeared in many of his productions, notably You Can't Take It With You, in which she leads a group of neighbors battling a tycoon who evicted them. Most of these appearances were supporting roles, although she had the ingenue lead in the Charles Starrett western Rio Grande (1938) and was featured in the Boris Karloff thriller The Man They Could Not Hang (1939).

She was most prominent in Columbia's two-reel comedies, which had smaller casts and accordingly gave supporting players more to do. She worked with The Three Stooges, Andy Clyde, Harry Langdon, Tom Kennedy, Walter Catlett. Roscoe Karns, Vera Vague, and especially Charley Chase. Her first appearance with Chase was as a gangster's moll in Time Out for Trouble (1938); Chase admired her comic timing and gave her ingenue leads in his subsequent shorts.

== Freelance career ==
Ann Doran's tenure at Columbia ended when Frank Capra angrily left the studio to make Meet John Doe (1941), and cast Doran as the wife of soda jerk-turned-John Doe Club activist Bert Hansen. Though her character speaks some of the film's most pivotal lines of dialogue, including an impassioned suicide-preventing plea in the final scene, her appearance in the film is uncredited. It is possible that Columbia studio chief Harry Cohn resented Ann Doran's following Capra, and dropped her from his contract roster.

Now away from Columbia, Ann Doran began freelancing and worked steadily for other companies. Her first freelance job after Columbia was for the low-budget Producers Releasing Corporation, where she had the ingenue lead in Criminals Within (1941). Never a glamour-girl ingenue, Doran always projected a sensible, down-to-earth quality that suited her plain-Jane looks, and she was always content to play supporting roles. "I'm happy in the leak light," she told the Los Angeles Times in 1981. With the spotlight on the star, "whatever leaked over the side, that's what I got." She continued to play character roles, large and small (including one as a Nazi agent in the 1942 Michael Shayne mystery Blue, White and Perfect).

When Columbia needed a comic actress to fill out a girls' baseball team in the Andy Clyde short Lovable Trouble (1941), Ann Doran got the call. This renewed her affiliation with the Columbia shorts department, where she was always welcome. She continued to work at Columbia off and on for the next several years, but never again under contract and always on a freelance basis.

Columbia filmed two boy-and-his-dog stories with juvenile star Ted Donaldson in 1945–46. When the Donaldson films became a full-fledged series (featuring the dog Rusty) in 1947, Doran was cast as Donaldson's mother in the next six films. Her maternal roles led to her being cast as James Dean's mother in Rebel Without a Cause (1955).

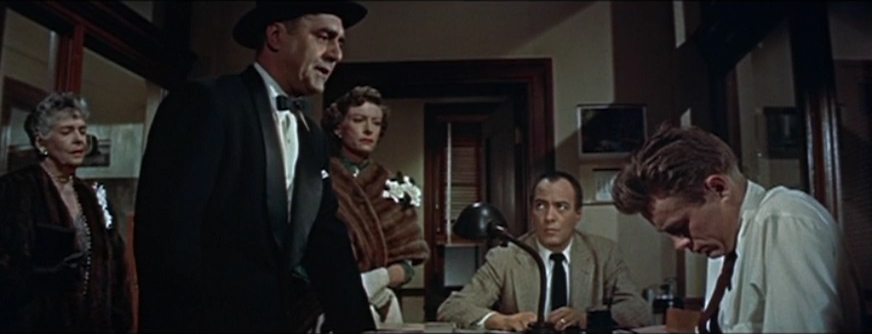
Virginia Brissac, Jim Backus, Doran, Edward Platt and James Dean in Rebel Without a Cause (1955)

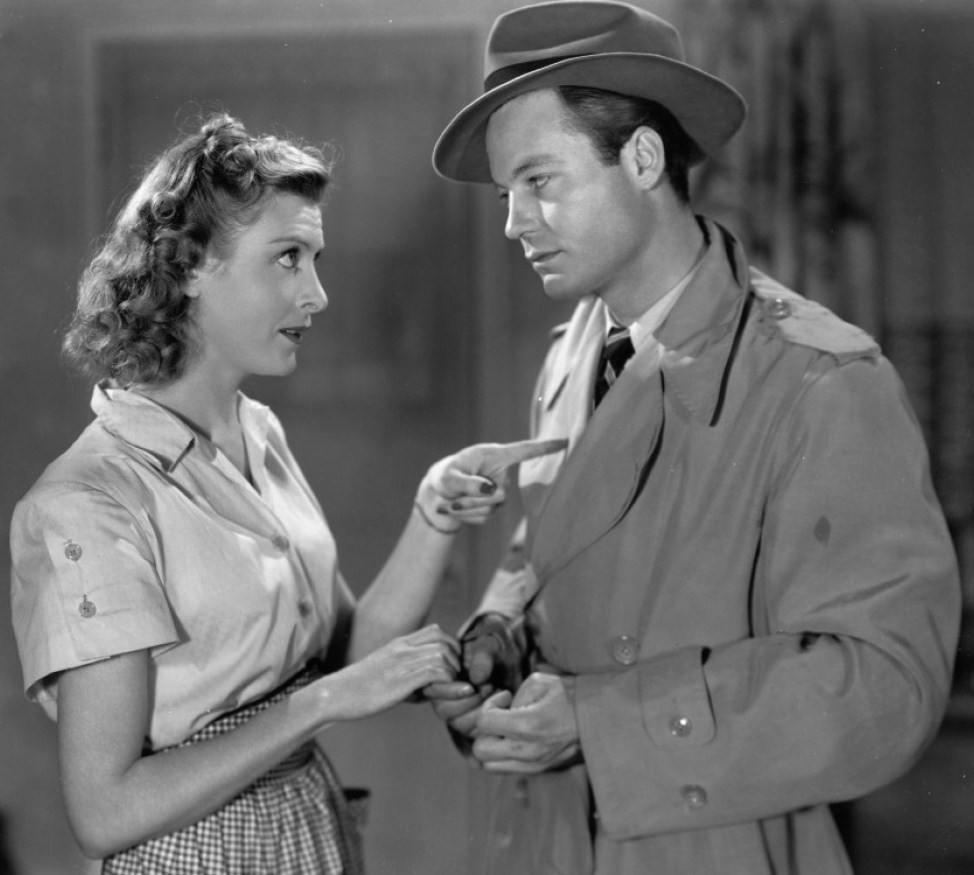
Doran and DeForest Kelley in Fear in the Night (1947)

== Television ==
Doran played Charlotte McHenry, the housekeeper on Shirley, Agnes Haskell, Eddie Haskell's mother and, in a separate appearance, Mrs. Bellamy, in Leave It to Beaver and Mrs. Kingston, the housekeeper, on Longstreet.

Doran guest-starred on television programs including three appearances in the role of Bonnie Landis in Public Defender, starring with fellow Texan Reed Hadley. She appeared in the anthology series Crossroads in the 1956 episode "The White Carnation", along with Elinor Donahue, James Best and J. Carrol Naish. In 1952, she appeared in an episode of The Lone Ranger titled "Hidden Fortune".

Doran was cast in the children's Western series My Friend Flicka, the story of a boy and his horse on a ranch in Wyoming. She also appeared in episodes of Ray Milland's sitcom Meet Mr. McNutley and Kenneth Tobey's aviation adventure series Whirlybirds. Doran guest-starred on Perry Mason in "The Case of the Prodigal Parent" (1958), "The Case of the Lurid Letter" (1962) and "The Case of the Drowsy Mosquito" (1963) as well as in Rawhide in the episode "Incident of the Challenge".

Doran was cast twice in 1959–1960 in episodes of the series Colt .45, starring Wayde Preston. In 1960, she was cast as Martha Brown, the mother of horse rider Velvet Brown (Lori Martin) in the family drama National Velvet. She made one appearance on McHale's Navy as Mrs. Martha "Pumpkin" Binghamton, wife of Captain Binghamton (Joe Flynn). In 1963 Doran appeared as Minerva Lewis on The Virginian in the episode "Run Away Home." Doran was cast twice as Mrs. Elliott and Hugh Beaumont as Mr. Elliott, parents of Steve Elliott (Mike Minor), in Petticoat Junction.

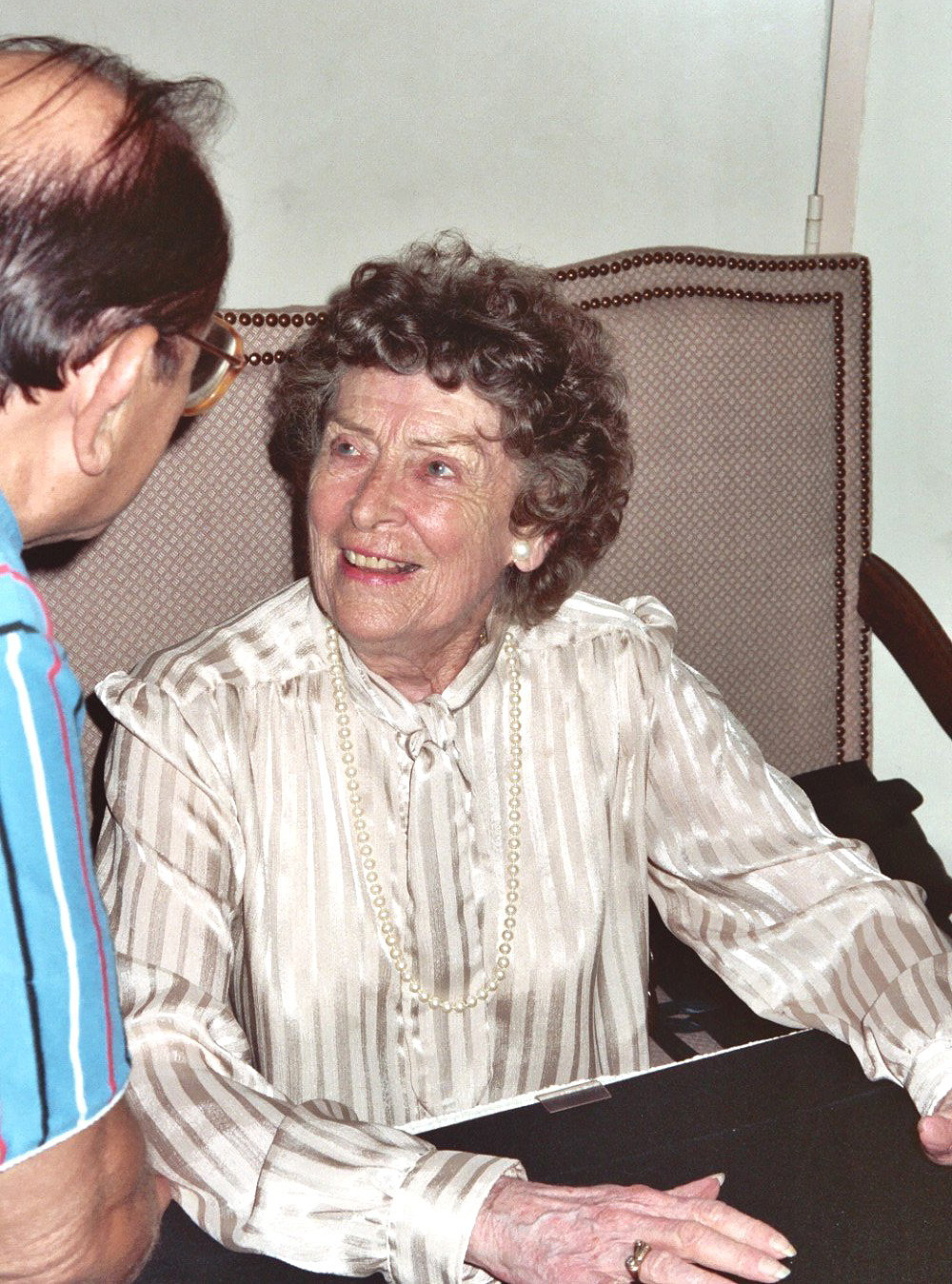
Doran in her later years

Three years later, she appeared in the first episode of The Legend of Jesse James as Zerelda James Samuel, the mother of Jesse and Frank James. She also appeared in M*A*S*H as Nurse Meg Cratty, who runs an orphanage in Korea. In the episode "The Kids", Cratty and her charges bunk with the M*A*S*H unit after having to evacuate when the orphanage was shelled.

== Death ==
Doran died at age 89 on September 19, 2000, at a senior-citizens complex in Carmichael, California. Following her death, her remains were cremated and scattered at sea. Doran never married or had children, dedicating her personal time entirely to her extensive acting career and industry union boards.

Ann Doran was a tireless worker for the motion picture industry. In 1960 she became the recording secretary for the Screen Actors Guild, and in 1990 she received the guild's Ralph Morgan Award, named after one the organization's founders, for distinguished service. During her long career she saved most of her salaries, and she bequeathed $400,000 to the Motion Picture Country House, the industry's retirement home in Woodland Hills, California.

== Filmography ==
=== Films ===
Year	Title	Role	Notes
1922	Robin Hood	Page to Richard	Uncredited
1934	One Exciting Adventure	Girl	
1934	Servants' Entrance	Marie, the Maid	Uncredited
1935	Night Life of the Gods	Girl in Pool	Uncredited
1935	Way Down East	Rosie – Hired Girl	
1935	Case of the Missing Man	Dental Nurse	Uncredited
1935	Bad Boy	Telegraph Clerk	Uncredited
1935	Mary Burns, Fugitive	Newspaper girl	
1936	Dangerous Intrigue	Floor Nurse	Uncredited
1936	Ring Around the Moon	Kay Duncan	
1936	Lady of Secrets	Reporter	Uncredited
1936	The Little Red Schoolhouse	Mary Burke	
1936	Mr. Deeds Goes to Town	Girl on Bus	Uncredited
1936	Let's Sing Again	Alice Alba	
1936	Palm Springs	Schoolgirl	Uncredited
1936	Missing Girls	Ann Jason	
1936	Red Lights Ahead	Mary Wallace	
1937	The Devil's Playground	Bit Part	Uncredited
1937	When You're in Love	Secretary	Uncredited
1937	The Go Getter	Maizie – the Maid	Uncredited
1937	Girls Can Play	Alice, Secretary	
1937	Marry the Girl	Marge, a Secretary	
1937	It's All Yours	Stewardess	Uncredited
1937	Stella Dallas	Minor Role	Uncredited
1937	I'll Take Romance	Opera Cast	Uncredited
1937	Nothing Sacred	Telephone Girl	Uncredited
1937	She Married an Artist	Model	Uncredited
1937	Paid to Dance	Rose Trevor	Alternative title: Hard to Hold
1937	The Shadow	Shaw Sister	
1938	Little Miss Roughneck	Girl	Uncredited
1938	Penitentiary	Blanche Williams	
1938	Women in Prison	Maggie	
1938	Start Cheering	Green's Secretary	Uncredited
1938	Extortion	Margie Blake	
1938	Holiday	Kitchen Maid	Uncredited
1938	The Main Event	Telegraph Clerk	Uncredited
1938	Highway Patrol	Estelle	
1938	City Streets	Nurse	Uncredited
1938	You Can't Take It with You	Maggie O'Neill	
1938	The Spider's Web	Mason's Secretary	Serial
1938	The Lady Objects	Miss Hollins	
1938	Blondie	Elsie Hazlip	
1938	Rio Grande	Jean Andrews	Lead role
1938	Smashing the Spy Ring	Madelon Martin	
1939	Homicide Bureau	Nurse	Uncredited
1939	Flying G-Men	Hamilton's Secretary	Serial
1939	My Son Is a Criminal	Taxicab Company Secretary	Uncredited
1939	Let Us Live	Secretary Juror	Uncredited
1939	Romance of the Redwoods		Uncredited
1939	Blind Alley	Agnes	
1939	Good Girls Go to Paris	Bridesmaid	Uncredited
1939	Coast Guard	Nurse	Uncredited
1939	The Man They Could Not Hang	Betty Crawford	
1939	A Woman Is the Judge	Luella	Uncredited
1939	Mr. Smith Goes to Washington	Paine's Secretary	Uncredited
1939	Three Sappy People	Countess	Short, Uncredited
1940	The Green Hornet	Josephine Weaver Allen	Serial, [Ch. 3], Uncredited
1940	His Girl Friday	Newspaper Office Worker	Uncredited
1940	Five Little Peppers at Home	Nurse	Uncredited
1940	Forgotten Girls	Inmate	Uncredited
1940	Untamed	1st Nurse	Uncredited
1940	Manhattan Heartbeat	Shop Girl's Friend	
1940	Girls of the Road	Jerry	
1940	Glamour for Sale	Myrtle	Uncredited
1940	Her First Romance	Student	
1941	Murder Among Friends	Dr. Turk's Nurse	Uncredited
1941	Meet John Doe	Bert Hansen's wife	Uncredited
1941	Ellery Queen's Penthouse Mystery	Sheila Cobb	
1941	Penny Serenade	Dotty "Dot"	
1941	Criminals Within	Linda	
1941	Dive Bomber	Helen – Joe's Date	Uncredited
1941	Sun Valley Serenade	Waitress	Uncredited
1941	Dr. Kildare's Wedding Day	Nurse at Party	Uncredited
1941	The Kid from Kansas	Julie 'Smitty' Smith	
1941	Sing Another Chorus	Bronx Dame	Uncredited
1941	Buy Me That Town	Woman	Uncredited
1941	New York Town	Demonstrator in Department Store	Uncredited
1942	Blue, White and Perfect	Miss Hoffman	
1942	Mr. Wise Guy	Dorothy Melton	
1942	Yankee Doodle Dandy	Receptionist	Uncredited
1942	They All Kissed the Bride	Helene – the Drew's Maid	Uncredited
1942	Beyond the Blue Horizon	Margaret Chase	Uncredited
1942	My Sister Eileen	Receptionist	Uncredited
1942	Street of Chance	Miss Peabody	
1942	Smith of Minnesota		Uncredited
1943	The Hard Way	Dorshka	Uncredited
1943	Air Force	Mrs. Mary Quincannon	Uncredited
1943	Slightly Dangerous	Salesgirl	Uncredited
1943	The More the Merrier	Miss Bilby	Uncredited
1943	So Proudly We Hail!	Lt. Betty Peterson	
1943	Gildersleeve on Broadway	Matilda Brown	
1943	Old Acquaintance	Music Store Saleslady	Uncredited
1943	True to Life	Radio Kitty	Uncredited
1944	The Story of Dr. Wassell	Praying Woman	Uncredited
1944	Mr. Skeffington	Maria, a nursemaid	Uncredited
1944	Henry Aldrich's Little Secret	Helen Martin	
1944	I Love a Soldier	Jenny Butler	
1944	Here Come the Waves	Ruth	
1945	Roughly Speaking	Alice Abbott	
1945	Pride of the Marines	Ella Mae Merchant	Alternative title: Forever in Love
1946	The Strange Love of Martha Ivers	Bobbi St. John	
1946	Our Hearts Were Growing Up	Monica Lonsdale	Uncredited
1947	The Perfect Marriage	Secretary Ellen	Uncredited
1947	My Favorite Brunette	Miss Rogers	
1947	Seven Were Saved	Mrs. Rollin Hartley	
1947	Fear in the Night	Lil Herlihy	
1947	For the Love of Rusty	Ethel Mitchell	
1947	The Crimson Key	Paris Wood	
1947	Second Chance	Doris Greene	
1947	The Son of Rusty	Ethel Mitchell	
1947	Variety Girl	Hairdresser	Uncredited
1947	Magic Town	Mrs. Weaver	
1947	Road to the Big House	Agnes Clark	
1948	Reaching from Heaven	Martha Kestner	
1948	The Return of the Whistler	Sybil Barkley	Uncredited
1948	My Dog Rusty	Ethel Mitchell	
1948	Hazard	Nurse	
1948	The Babe Ruth Story	Reporter	Uncredited
1948	The Walls of Jericho	Gossip	Uncredited
1948	Pitfall	Maggie	
1948	Rusty Leads the Way	Ethel Mitchell	
1948	Sealed Verdict	Ellie Blaine, Red Cross date	
1948	The Snake Pit	Valerie	
1948	No Minor Vices	Mrs. Faraday	Uncredited
1948	He Walked by Night	Dispatcher	Uncredited
1949	The Accused	Miss Rice – Nurse	
1949	Rusty Saves a Life	Ethel Mitchell	
1949	The Clay Pigeon	Miss Collins – Naval Nurse	Uncredited
1949	Big Jack	Sarah Oakes	Uncredited
1949	The Fountainhead	Wynand's Secretary	Uncredited
1949	One Last Fling	Vera Thompson	
1949	Air Hostess	Virginia Barton	
1949	Calamity Jane and Sam Bass	Mrs. Lucy Egan	
1949	The Kid from Cleveland	Emily Barrows Novak	
1949	Holiday in Havana	Marge Henley	
1949	Beyond the Forest	Edith Williams	Uncredited
1949	Rusty's Birthday	Ethel Mitchell	
1950	Riding High	Nurse	Uncredited
1950	No Sad Songs for Me	Louise Spears	
1950	Never a Dull Moment	Jean Morrow	
1950	Lonely Heart Bandits	Nancy Crane	
1950	The Jackpot	Miss Alice Bowen	Uncredited
1951	Gambling House	Della	
1951	Tomahawk	Mrs. Carrington	
1951	The Painted Hills	Martha Blake	
1951	Her First Romance	Mrs. Foster	
1951	The People Against O'Hara	Betty Clark, Policewoman	
1951	Starlift	Mrs. Callan – Nurse	Uncredited
1952	Here Come the Nelsons	Clara Randolph	
1952	Love Is Better Than Ever	Mrs. Levoy	
1952	Rodeo	Mrs. Martha Durston	Uncredited
1952	Paula	Mrs. Smith, welfare worker	Uncredited
1952	The Rose Bowl Story	Mrs. Addie Burke	
1953	So This Is Love	Mrs. James Moore	
1953	Island in the Sky	Moon's wife	Uncredited
1953	The Eddie Cantor Story	Lillian Edwards	
1953	I Love Lucy	Audience Member	
1954	The High and the Mighty	Mrs. Joseph	
1954	Them!	Child Psychiatrist	Uncredited
1954	The Bob Mathias Story	Mrs. Lillian Mathias	
1955	The Desperate Hours	Mrs. Walling	Uncredited
1955	Rebel Without a Cause	Carol Stark	
1957	Shoot-Out at Medicine Bend	Sarah Devlin	
1957	The Man Who Turned to Stone	Mrs. Ford	
1957	Shoot-Out at Medicine Bend	Sarah Devlin	Uncredited
1957	Band of Angels	Mrs. Morton	Uncredited
1957	Young and Dangerous	Mrs. Clara Clinton	
1957	Bombers B-52	Sylvia Slater	Uncredited
1958	The Deep Six	Elsie – Mike's Wife	Uncredited
1958	The Female Animal	Nurse	
1958	The Rawhide Trail	Mrs. Cartwright	
1958	Day of the Badman	Martha Mordigan	
1958	Violent Road	Edith Miller	
1958	Life Begins at 17	Virginia Peck	
1958	Voice in the Mirror	Mrs. Devlin	
1958	It! The Terror from Beyond Space	Mary Royce	
1958	The Badlanders	Stagecoach Passenger – Mother	Uncredited
1958	Step Down to Terror	Mrs. Duprez	Uncredited
1958	Joy Ride	Grace	
1959	Warlock	Mrs. Richardson	Uncredited
1959	Riot in Juvenile Prison	Bess Monahan	
1959	Cast a Long Shadow	Charlotte Calvert	
1959	The FBI Story	Mrs. Ballard	Uncredited
1959	A Summer Place	Mrs. Talbert	Uncredited
1963	Captain Newman, M.D.	Mrs. Pyser	Uncredited
1964	The Carpetbaggers	Reporter	Uncredited
1964	The Brass Bottle	Martha Kenton	
1964	Where Love Has Gone	Mrs. Geraghty	
1964	Kitten with a Whip	Mavis Varden	
1965	Mirage	Tenant in Apartment 3R	Uncredited
1966	Not with My Wife, You Don't!	Doris Parker	
1967	The Hostage	Miss Mabry	
1967	Rosie!	Old Lady	
1968	Live a Little, Love a Little	Landlady	Uncredited
1969	Once You Kiss a Stranger	Lee's Mother	
1969	The Arrangement	Nurse Costello	Uncredited
1969	Topaz	Mrs. Forsyth	Uncredited
1970	There Was a Crooked Man...	Mrs. Lomax	
1971	The Hired Hand	Mrs. Sorenson	
1976	The Gumball Rally	Mrs. Ontley	
1976	Flood!	Emma Fisher	TV movie
1981	All Night Long	Grandmother Gibbons	
1981	First Monday in October	Storekeeper	
1986	Wildcats	Mrs. Chatham	Alternative title: First and Goal

=== Television ===
Year	Title	Role	Notes
1952	Adventures of Superman	Mrs. King	1 episode
1953	The Danny Thomas Show	Teacher	1 episode
1954	Ramar of the Jungle	Irene Loring	1 episode
1955	Brave Eagle	Whispering Grass	1 episode
1956	Father Knows Best	Dorothy Tyler	1 episode
1957	December Bride	Miss Moore	1 episode
1958	M Squad	Mrs. Rainey	1 episode
1958	Perry Mason	Mrs. Claire Durrell in "The Case of the Prodigal Parent"	1 episode
1958	Official Detective	Charlotte	Episode: "The Cover-Up"
1959	Frontier Doctor	Ma "Dallas" Bell	1 episode
1959	Bourbon Street Beat	Mary Dumont	1 episode, "The Tiger Moth"
	The Donna Reed Show	Mrs Adams	1 Episode: "The Report Card"
1960	General Electric Theater	Tourist	Episode: "Adam's Apples"
1960	Wagon Train	Aunt Lizzie	1 episode
1960–1962	National Velvet	Martha Brown	58 episodes
1963–1970	The Virginian	Various	5 episodes
1965	McHale's Navy	Mrs. Binghamton	1 episode
1966–1967	Hey, Landlord	Marcy Banner	2 episodes
1967, season 5	Petticoat Junction	Mrs. Elliott	2 episodes
1966–1968	Bonanza	Lisa Stanley / Mrs. Walker	2 episodes
1968	The Guns of Will Sonnett	Margaret Stover	1 episode
1970	The Bold Ones: The Lawyers	Mrs. Grimbi	1 episode
1970	Ironside	Dora Copeland	1 episode
1971–1972	Longstreet	Mrs. Kingston	23 episodes
1972	The Odd Couple	Loretta Spoon	1 episode
1973	Emergency!	Mrs. Perigrew and Hannah	2 episodes
1973	Barnaby Jones	Nurse Nora Randall	1 episode
1974	The Rookies	Mrs. Coleman	1 episode
1974	Little House on the Prairie	Mrs. Tyler	1 episode
1975	M*A*S*H	Nurse Meg Cratty	1 episode
1977	Peter Lundy and the Medicine Hat Stallion	Grandma Lundy	TV movie
1978	Fantasy Island	Emma Howard	1 episode
1979	Eight Is Enough	Ms. Ryder	1 episode
1980	Shirley	Charlotte McHenry	13 episodes
1982	Father Murphy	Abby	1 episode
1983	Tales of the Unexpected	Mary Deacon	1 episode
1984	Knots Landing	Mercy	1 episode
1985	Highway to Heaven	Mrs. Bradley	2 episodes
1986	The A-Team	Nora	1 episode
1986	Trapper John, M.D.	Mrs. McAndrew	1 episode
1987	The Twilight Zone	Mrs. Clark	1 episode
1988	Hunter	Mrs. Rawling	1 episode (final appearance)
