= Once Upon a Time (1944 film) =

1944 film by Alexander Hall

- 1944 theatrical poster
- Directed by: Alexander Hall
- Written by: Lucille Fletcher (story); Irving Fineman (adaptation)
- Screenplay by: Lewis Meltzer; Oscar Saul
- Based on: My Client Curly; 1940 Columbia Workshop radio play by Norman Corwin
- Produced by: Louis F. Edelman
- Starring: Cary Grant; Janet Blair; James Gleason; Ted Donaldson
- Cinematography: Franz Planer
- Edited by: Gene Havlick
- Music by: Frederick Hollander
- Color process: Black and white
- Production company: Columbia Pictures
- Distributed by: Columbia Pictures
- Release date: June 29, 1944
- Running time: 89 minutes
- Country: United States
- Language: English

Once Upon a Time is a 1944 American comedy fantasy film involving a dancing caterpillar who lives in a small box. Cary Grant plays a conniving showman who desperately needs money to save his theater. The film was based on a 1940 radio play called "My Client Curley", adapted by Norman Corwin from a magazine story by Lucille Fletcher.

== Plot ==
Jerry Flynn has to come up with $100,000 within a week to keep his theater. By chance, youngster Arthur "Pinky" Thompson shows him "Curly" (the original title of the film), a caterpillar that gets up on its tail and dances when Pinky plays "Yes Sir, That's My Baby" on his harmonica. Pinky refuses to let Jerry buy his friend, so they become partners. The boy is an orphan being raised by his showgirl sister Jeannie, so he soon becomes very attached to Jerry, as does his sister.

Jerry is soon publicizing Curly, managing to generate a nationwide sensation. Brandt, a suspicious reporter who has been feuding with Jerry, brings in scientists to examine Curly. To his great disappointment, the caterpillar turns out to be genuine. When the scientists want to keep Curly for further research (and later dissection), it causes a national uproar, with people divided in their opinions.

Meanwhile, behind Pinky's back, Jerry negotiates to sell Curly to Walt Disney, finally getting his price of $100,000. Jerry orders his assistant, the "Moke", to steal Curly while Pinky is asleep, but the boy wakes up and takes Curly home. Jerry confronts a heartbroken Pinky and gets the insect, but is so ashamed of himself that he leaves the apartment without Curly.

Later, Curly goes missing. Meanwhile, knowing that Jerry and Pinky miss each other, the Moke arranges with the boys of the various Curly fan clubs that have sprung up to get them back together. After their happy reconciliation, Jerry discovers that Curly has transformed into a butterfly.

== Cast ==
- Cary Grant as Jerry Flynn
- Janet Blair as Jeannie Thompson
- James Gleason as McGillicuddy aka The Moke
- Ted Donaldson as Arthur "Pinky" Thompson
- William Demarest as Brandt

== Production ==
The film's working titles were Curly, My Friend Curly, My Client Curly and Yes Sir, That's My Baby.

== See also ==
- One Froggy Evening, a 1955 Warner Bros. cartoon about a frog that both sings and dances
- Sametka, a 1967 animated short by Zdeněk Miler based on the film. Sametka at IMDb
