= Tars and Spars =

1946 American film directed by Alfred Edward Green

- Theatrical poster for the film
- Directed by: Alfred E. Green
- Written by: John Jacoby; Sarett Tobias; Decla Dunning; Barry Trivers
- Produced by: Milton H. Bren
- Starring: Alfred Drake; Janet Blair; Marc Platt
- Cinematography: Joseph Walker
- Edited by: Al Clark
- Music by: M. W. Stoloff
- Production company: Columbia Pictures
- Release date: January 10, 1946 (US)
- Running time: 86 minutes
- Country: United States
- Language: English

Tars and Spars is a 1946 American musical romantic comedy film directed by Alfred E. Green and starring Alfred Drake, Janet Blair, and Marc Platt.

== Plot ==
Howard Young is a coast guardsman who has been on shore duty for three years despite his efforts to be sent into action. His nearest approach to sea duty was on a harbor-moored life raft for 21 days as part of an experiment with a new type of vitamin gum for the government. He meets Christine Bradley, a SPAR, sent to take over his communications job and, by things he leaves unsaid, she thinks his life-raft experience was the result of a ship-wreck at sea.

== Cast ==
- Alfred Drake as Howard Young of Oklahoma
- Janet Blair as Christine Bradley of Pennsylvania
- Marc Platt as Junior Casady of Indiana
- Jeff Donnell as Penny McDougal of Brooklyn
- Sid Caesar as Chuck Enders of Yonkers, U.S.A.
- Ray Walker as Lieutenant Scully
- James Flavin as Chief Bosun Mate Gurney
