= Marc Platt (dancer) =

American actor and dancer (1913-2014)

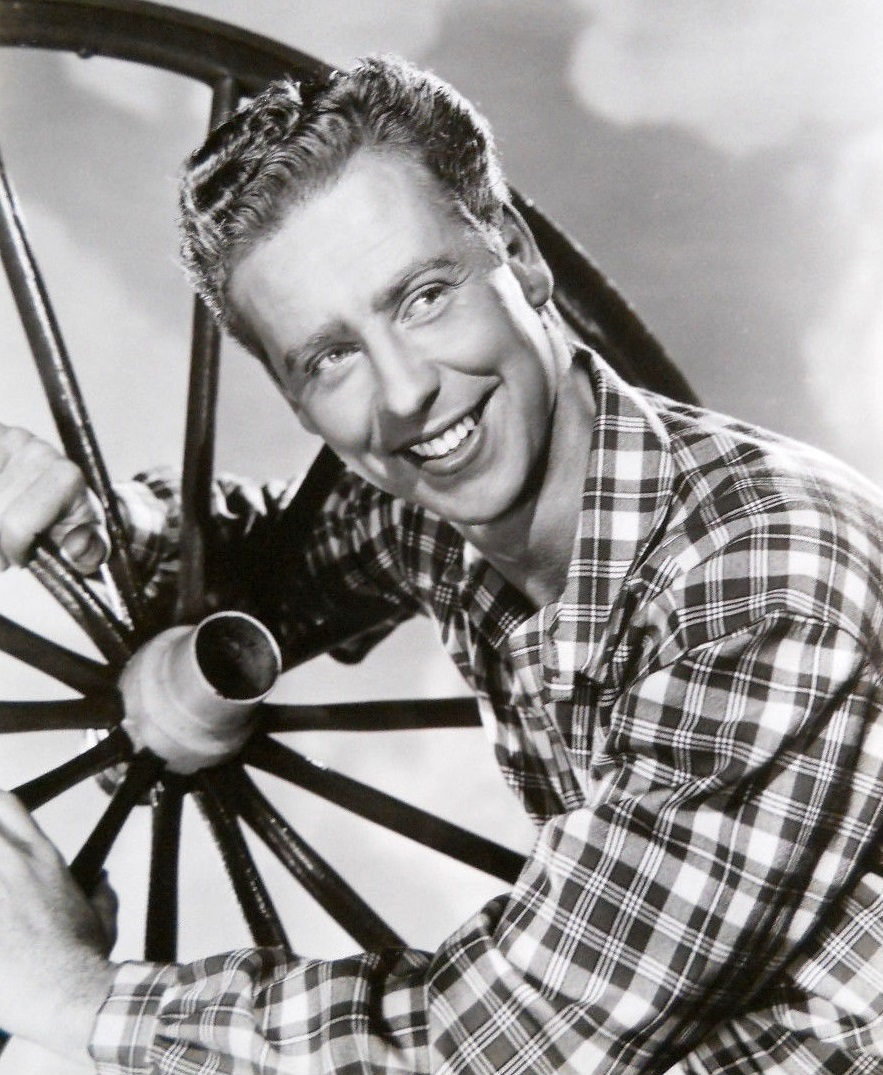
- Platt in 1947
- Born: Marcel Emile Gaston LePlat; December 2, 1913; Pasadena, California, U.S.
- Died: March 29, 2014 (aged 100); San Rafael, California, U.S.
- Other names: Marc Platoff; Marc Plant
- Occupations: Ballet dancer, musical theatre performer, and actor
- Years active: 1932–1993
- Spouse(s): Eleanor Marra (1942–1947; divorced); 1 child Jean Goodall (1951–1994; her death); 2 children

Marcel Emile Gaston LePlat (December 2, 1913 – March 29, 2014), known professionally as Marc Platt, was an American ballet dancer, musical theatre performer, and actor. He was best known for his portrayal of Daniel Pontipee, one of the seven brothers in the film Seven Brides for Seven Brothers.

== Biography ==
Born Marcel Emile Gaston LePlat to a French immigrant father in Pasadena, California, he was one of the original members of the Ballet Russe de Monte Carlo, performing under the name Platoff. While with the company, Platt choreographed Ghost Town (1939), set to music by Richard Rodgers.

Platt danced the role of Chalmers/Dream Curly in the original 1943 Broadway production of Oklahoma!. Platt was also in the 1955 film version of Oklahoma! in a dancing/speaking role as one of Curly's cowboy friends, the cowboy friend who buys Curly's saddle for $10 at the auction and comments that, the previous year, Ado Annie's sweet potato pie gave him a "three day bellyache". Platt is credited in the cast list of the film as a dancer.

Another notable role for Platt was as a replacement in the role of Bill Calhoun/Lucent in the Cole Porter musical, Kiss Me, Kate, which opened on Broadway on December 30, 1948, though Platt did not join the cast until 1949.

After he stopped dancing, Platt served as the director of the Radio City Music Hall Ballet for several years, then transitioned to full-time teaching. In 2000, Platt was presented with the Nijinsky Award at the Ballets Russes Reunion. He appeared in the 2005 documentary Ballets Russes.

== Personal life ==
Platt was married twice and has three children. Ted Le Plat, from his first marriage, is an actor and musician living in Los Angeles. In 1951, Platt married dancer Jean Goodall who died in 1994; the couple had two children, Michael and Donna.

Platt died of pneumonia at a hospice in San Rafael, California, on March 29, 2014, aged 100.

== Filmography ==
- The Gay Parisian (1941) (short subject)
- You're in the Army Now (1941)
- Who Calls (1942) (short subject)
- Tonight and Every Night (1945)
- Tars and Spars (1946)
- Down to Earth (1947)
- When a Girl's Beautiful (1947)
- The Swordsman (1948)
- Addio Mimi! (1949)
- Seven Brides for Seven Brothers (1954)
- Oklahoma! (1955)
- These Wilder Years (1956)
- Ballets Russes (2005) (documentary)
- Broadway: Beyond the Golden Age (2018) (documentary)

== Stage appearances ==
- The Lady Comes Across (1942)
- Beat the Band (1942)
- Oklahoma! (1943)
- Kiss Me, Kate (1949-1952)
- Maggie (1953)
