= Sing Another Chorus =

1941 film by Charles Lamont

- Directed by: Charles Lamont
- Written by: Marion Orth; Paul Gerard Smith; Brenda Weisberg
- Produced by: Ken Goldsmith; Milton Schwarzwald
- Starring: Jane Frazee; Johnny Downs; Mischa Auer
- Cinematography: Jerome Ash
- Edited by: Arthur Hilton
- Music by: Charles Previn
- Production company: Universal Pictures
- Distributed by: Universal Pictures
- Release date: September 19, 1941
- Running time: 64 minutes
- Country: United States
- Language: English

Sing Another Chorus is a 1941 American musical comedy film directed by Charles Lamont and starring Jane Frazee, Johnny Downs and Mischa Auer. It was made and distributed by Hollywood studio Universal Pictures.

== Plot ==
Andy Peyton comes home from college, wanting not to work for his father's failing garment business but to be involved in stage shows and entertainment. A former burlesque queen, Francine LaVerne, encourages him in this pursuit.

Edna, loyal secretary to Arthur Peyton at his dress business, and Stanislaus, the janitor, suggest that to mark the company's 25th anniversary, Andy put on a show. After being tricked out of thousands of dollars by a con artist, Theodore Gateson, it looks like the end for Mr. Peyton's business. However, the show staged by Andy is a huge hit, Gateson is found, the money is recovered, Edna falls in love with Andy and a Broadway producer is interested in making the show a smash.

== Cast ==
- Jane Frazee as Edna
- Johnny Downs as Andy
- Mischa Auer as Stanislaus
- George Barbier as Arthur Peyton
- Iris Adrian as Francine
- Sunnie O'Dea as Peggy
- Joe Brown Jr. as Ralph
- Walter Catlett as Gateson
- Charles Lane as Ryan
- Peter Peters as Morris
- Ronald Peters as Boris
- Eddie Kane as John Maxwell
- Antonio El Bailarín as Specialty Dancer
- Ann Doran as Bronx Dame
- Greta Granstedt as Soubrette

== Bibliography ==
- Biskupski, M.B.B. Hollywood's War with Poland, 1939-1945. University Press of Kentucky, 2011.
- Fetrow, Alan G. Feature Films, 1940-1949: a United States Filmography. McFarland, 1994.
