= When a Girl's Beautiful =

1947 film directed by Frank McDonald

- Directed by: Frank McDonald
- Screenplay by: Brenda Weisberg
- Story by: Henry K. Moritz
- Produced by: Wallace McDonald
- Starring: Adele Jergens; Marc Platt; Patricia Berry
- Cinematography: Henry Freulich
- Edited by: Jerome Thoms
- Distributed by: Columbia
- Release dates: July 13, 1947 (New York City); September 25, 1947 (United States)
- Running time: 68 minutes

When a Girl's Beautiful is a 1947 American musical comedy film directed by Frank McDonald from a script by Brenda Weisberg. Actress Joi Lansing made her film debut on this film.

== Plot ==
An advertising man begins a search for the "perfect woman" for a new perfume campaign. After he makes a composite (nicknamed "Miss Temptation") based on several models, his boss believes the woman is real and requests for the man to go and find her. The girl he finds doesn't want to be a model at all, and further complications ensue.

== Cast ==
- Adele Jergens – Adele Jordan
- Marc Platt – Johnny Hanley
- Patricia Berry – Ellen Trennis
- Stephen Dunne – Marshall Forrest
- Peggie Castle (credited as Peggy Call) – "Koko" Glayde
