= The Son of Rusty =

1947 film by Lew Landers

- Directed by: Lew Landers
- Written by: Malcolm Stuart Boylan; Al Martin
- Produced by: Wallace MacDonald
- Starring: Ted Donaldson; Stephen Dunne; Ann Doran
- Cinematography: Henry Freulich
- Edited by: Aaron Stell
- Music by: Mischa Bakaleinikoff (uncredited); Irving Gertz (uncredited); Clarence Wheeler (uncredited)
- Production company: Columbia Pictures
- Distributed by: Columbia Pictures
- Release date: August 7, 1947
- Running time: 69 minutes
- Country: United States
- Language: English

The Son of Rusty is a 1947 American drama film directed by Lew Landers and starring Ted Donaldson, Stephen Dunne and Ann Doran. It was part of Columbia Pictures' eight-film Rusty series about a boy and his valiant German Shepherd.

== Plot ==
Danny Mitchell and friends, Squeaky Foley, Gerald Hebble, Nip and Tuck Worden hang out in their clubhouse, listening to the radio serial "Fang, the Detective Dog" while they collect enough Vitabark box tops to send off for a book How to Train Your Dog to Be a Detective so they can train Danny's German Shepherd, Rusty. The clubhouse is on private property belonging to retired lawyer Franklyn B. Gibson, who instead of running the boys off, uses it as an opportunity to teach a lesson in responsibility.

When a mysterious young man Jed Barlow and his German Shepherd Barb move to Lawtonville, rumors soon spread that Jed is a former "jailbird" based on a letter addressed to him from a U.S. Army Military Prison. Barlow is surly and uncommunicative, but Danny befriends him when Rusty becomes friends with Barb.

Barlow is sharecropping the old, dilapidated, empty Gruber farm and is arrested when the townspeople accuse him of deliberately injuring Rusty while dynamiting a tree stump. Danny, refusing to believe Barlow would deliberately harm Rusty, convinces Mr. Gibson to defend Barlow. During the trial Barlow testifies that he is a veteran spurned by his girl friend and has become embittered at the world as a result.

Mr. Gibson uses Barlow's testimony to argue that society is too often quick to judge people on outward appearances. Jed Barlow's main accuser Gerald Hebble's older brother Luther is charged with slander and the two German Shepherds, Rusty & Barb, become real good friends, hence the movie's title.

== Cast ==
Source for uncredited:

- Ted Donaldson as Danny Mitchell
- Stephen Dunne as Jed Barlow
- Tom Powers as Hugh Mitchell
- Ann Doran as Ethel Mitchell
- Thurston Hall as Franklyn B. Gibson
- Matt Willis as Luther Hebble
- Rudy Robles as Gono
- Rusty as Rusty
- Ted Infuhr as Squeaky Foley (uncredited)
- Dwayne Hickman as Nip Worden (uncredited)
- David Ackles as Tuck Worden (uncredited)
- Harlan Briggs as Dr. McNamara (uncredited)
- Griff Barnett as Judge (uncredited)
- Edythe Elliott as Mrs. Hebble (uncredited)
- Ernie Adams as Postmaster (uncredited)
- Kenneth MacDonald as Police chief (uncredited)
- Fred Sears as E. A. Thompson (uncredited)
- Norman Ollestad as Sammy (uncredited)
- Chester Conklin as Bakery clerk (uncredited)
- Dick Elliott as Mayor (uncredited)
- Minta Durfee as Townswoman (uncredited)
- Blackie Whiteford as Gossiper (uncredited)
