= My Dog Rusty =

1948 film by Lew Landers

- Directed by: Lew Landers
- Written by: William Sackheim; Brenda Weisberg; Al Martin
- Produced by: Wallace MacDonald
- Starring: Ted Donaldson; John Litel; Ann Doran
- Cinematography: Vincent J. Farrar
- Edited by: Jerome Thoms
- Production company: Columbia Pictures
- Distributed by: Columbia Pictures
- Release date: April 8, 1948
- Running time: 67 minutes
- Country: United States
- Language: English

My Dog Rusty is a 1948 American drama film directed by Lew Landers and starring Ted Donaldson, John Litel and Ann Doran. It was part of the eight-film Rusty series of films produced by Columbia Pictures, about a boy and his valiant German Shepherd.

== Cast ==
Source for uncredited:

- Ted Donaldson as Danny Mitchell
- John Litel as Hugh Mitchell
- Ann Doran as Ethel Mitchell
- Mona Barrie as Dr. Toni Cordell
- Whitford Kane as Joshua Michael Tucker
- Jimmy Lloyd as Rodney Pyle
- Lewis L. Russell as Mayor Fulderwilder
- Flame as Rusty
- Olin Howland as Frank Foley (uncredited)
- Harry Harvey as Mr. Hebble (uncredited)
- Ferris Taylor as Bill Worden (uncredited)
- Dwayne Hickman as Nip Worden (uncredited)
- David Ackles as Tuck Worden (uncredited)
- Jack Rice as Jack (uncredited)
- Minta Durfee as Mrs. Laura Foley (uncredited)
- Jessie Arnold as Mrs. Stokes (uncredited)
- Fred Aldrich as Truck driver (uncredited)
