= Muriel Pollock =

American songwriter, composer and musician (1895–1971)

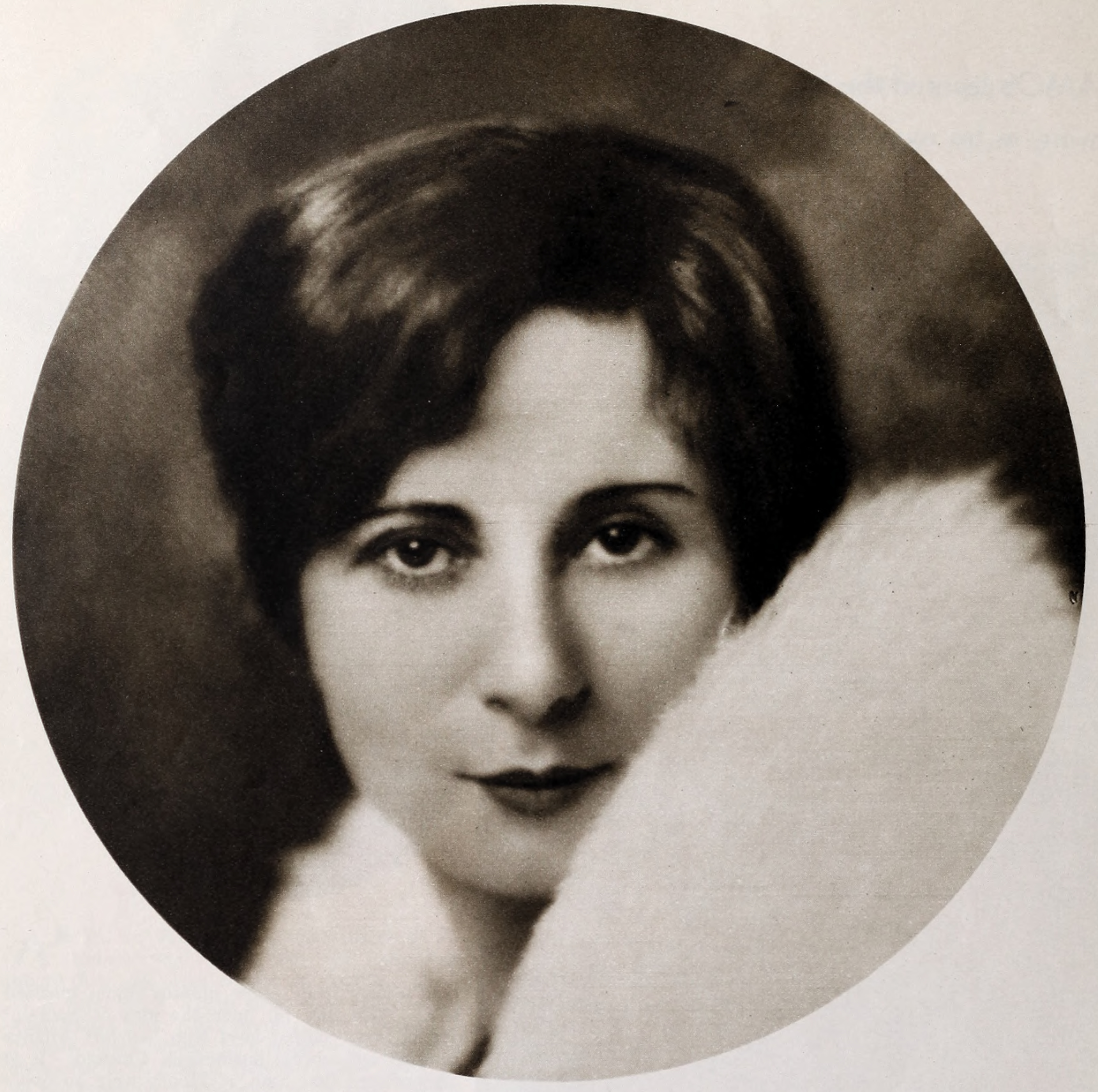
- Pollock in 1932
- Born: Mary Pollock; January 21, 1895; Kingsbridge, New York, U.S.
- Died: May 25, 1971 (aged 76); Los Angeles, California
- Other names: Muriel Pollock Groll, Muriel Pollock Donaldson, Muriel Pollack, Molly Donaldson
- Occupations: songwriter, pianist, organist

Muriel Pollock (January 21, 1895 – May 25, 1971) was an American songwriter, composer, pianist, and organist. She wrote and performed music for Broadway shows, radio programs, children's plays, and piano rolls.

== Early life ==
Mary Pollock was born in Kingsbridge, New York, the daughter of Joseph Pollock and Rose Graff. Both parents were immigrants from Russia. Her father ran a news stand. She studied at the New York Institute of Musical Art, a precursor of the Juilliard School.

== Career ==
As a young woman, Pollock played the organ in silent movie theatres, and worked at her father's news stand. She wrote a musical, Mme. Pom Pom, in 1914, with Marie Wardall. Another 1914 work, "Carnival", was written for a fundraising event for the Sanitarium for Hebrew Children in Rockaway Park. Pollock's Broadway credits included Jack and Jill (1923), for which she supplied "additional music"; Rio Rita (1927–1928) and Ups-a Daisy (1928), in which she appeared playing piano duets with Constance Mering; Pleasure Bound (1929), for which she wrote the music; and the musical revue Shoot the Works (1931), for which she wrote both music and lyrics.

Pollock worked at Mel-o-Dee Music Company and Rhythmodik Music Corporation, composing, arranging, and playing works for piano roll. She later performed duets with Vee Lawnhurst, as The Lady Bugs or The Lady Fingers, and played one piano roll duet with George Gershwin. In 1922 she sang and played piano in Bermuda, in a grand concert at the Colonial Opera House. She made many recordings between 1927 and 1934, most of them on the Edison label. She was a frequent pianist on radio programs, sometimes playing her own "compositions especially for radio", and sometimes playing other works or accompanying other performers. She became an ASCAP member in 1933. After her second marriage, she wrote music for children's shows using the pseudonym Molly Donaldson, based on fairy tales or historical figures' lives, but her family's move to California took her away from the hub of radio work.

== Personal life ==
Muriel Pollock married twice. Her first husband was Leon Leroy Groll; they married in 1925, and divorced by 1930. She became the stepmother of child actor Ted Donaldson when she married his widowed father, songwriter Will Donaldson, in 1933. Will Donaldson died in 1954; she died in 1971, aged 76 years, in Hollywood. She left support for a liberal arts scholarship at Los Angeles City College. Remastered recordings by Pollock are available in updated formats, including a 1998 CD, titled Keyboards of the Gershwin Era, Volume VI.
