= For the Love of Rusty =

1947 film by John Sturges

- Theatrical release poster
- Directed by: John Sturges
- Written by: Malcolm Stuart Boylan; Al Martin
- Produced by: John Haggott
- Starring: Ted Donaldson; Tom Powers; Ann Doran; Aubrey Mather; Sid Tomack
- Cinematography: Vincent Farrar
- Edited by: James Sweeney
- Music by: Marlin Skiles
- Distributed by: Columbia Pictures
- Release date: May 1, 1947
- Running time: 68 minutes
- Language: English
- Budget: $200,000

For the Love of Rusty is a 1947 American drama film directed by John Sturges. It was the third of the "Rusty" film series involving the adventures of German Shepherd Rusty and his human companions - young Danny Mitchell (Ted Donaldson) and his pals. This film details Danny's friendship with an eccentric and itinerant "veterinarian" Dr. Fay (Aubrey Mather), and Danny's attempts to form a closer relationship with his father (Tom Powers). In this installment, Rusty was played for the first time by Flame, who would portray Rusty in four of the eight Rusty films.

== Plot ==
Busy attorney Hugh Mitchell wants to become closer to his son, Danny, whom he knows little. He starts arranging a luncheon, but soon finds out that Danny prefers going to the carnival. Still he attends the luncheon, and brings along his dog Rusty, a German Shepherd. All the other boys attending with their fathers are quite amused when Rusty starts fighting with another dog, and the luncheon is abruptly interrupted.

The calamity that ensues enrages Hugh and disintegrates the chances of father and son coming closer. Instead Danny becomes friends with an eccentric traveling veterinarian, Dr. Francis Xavier Fay, who arrives to town. Hugh doesn't look kindly upon the friendship between his son and the doctor.

In an attempt to get their son back, Hugh and his wife Ethel invites the doctor to dinner one night, hoping that the doctor will seem out of place. But the doctor is very comfortable in the civilized and sophisticated setting in the attorney home.

Hugh decides to take Danny to the carnival to make him happy. Danny brings Rusty with him. When a man kicks at the dog, it attacks him and Hugh is quite upset with the dog's behavior, forcing it to wear a muzzle in the future.

In the night, Danny run away with his dog, taking refuge in the doctor's camp in the woods. Ethel suggest they leave the boy alone for a while, and Danny gets to live in a tree house at the doctor's, with his dog.

Hugh pays the doctor a visit to talk about his son, and gets the advice to try and understand and be friends with his son. Later in the night, when the doctor has fallen asleep with his gas stove on, Rusty smells the gas and tries to warn them about the danger. Rusty crawls under the trailer and is injured when the trailer collapses to the ground. Danny wakes up when the dog cries out, and wakes up the doctor, who is unconscious from the gas.

Danny goes home to his parents and the doctor treats Rusty at the camp. Hugh and his son are finally reconciled and go back to the doctor's camp together. Rusty is in bandages and able to come home with Danny.

Already the next day, Ethel comes to the camp looking for the dog, which has escaped and run around in the neighborhood. The doctor tells Ethel that this is perfectly normal, and decides it is time for him to leave and go to the next town.

== Cast ==
- Ted Donaldson as Danny Mitchell
- Tom Powers as Hugh Mitchell
- Ann Doran as Ethel Mitchell
- Aubrey Mather as Dr. Francis Xavier Fay
- Sid Tomack as Moe Hatch
- George Meader as J. Cecil Rinehardt
- Mickey McGuire as Gerald Hebble
- Ralph Dunn as Policeman (uncredited)
- Dick Elliott as Bill Worden (uncredited)
- Harry Hayden as Mr. Hebble (uncredited)
- Dwayne Hickman Doc Levy Jr. (uncredited)
- Olin Howland as Frank Foley (uncredited)
- Teddy Infuhr as Tommy Worden (uncredited)
- Wally Rose as Bit Role (uncredited)
- Fred F. Sears as Doc Levy (uncredited)
- Almira Sessions as Sarah Johnson (uncredited)

== See also ==
- Adventures of Rusty
- Rusty (film series)
