= God's Country (1946 film) =

1946 film by Robert Emmett Tansey

- Directed by: Robert Emmett Tansey
- Written by: Frances Kavanaugh
- Based on: novel by James Oliver Curwood
- Produced by: William B. David
- Starring: Robert Lowery; Helen Gilbert; Buster Keaton
- Cinematography: Marcel Le Picard; Carl Wester
- Edited by: Martin G. Cohn; George McGuire
- Music by: James Mayfield
- Production company: Action Pictures
- Distributed by: Screen Guild Productions
- Release date: March 15, 1946
- Running time: 64 minutes
- Country: United States
- Language: English

God's Country is a 1946 Western movie directed by Robert Emmett Tansey and featuring Robert Lowery, Helen Gilbert and Buster Keaton. It is a low-budget color B Western set in the contemporary American West.

== Plot ==
Lee Preston, aka Leland Bruce (Lowery), kills a man in self-defense but flees to the redwood country when the law makes it a murder charge. There he meets Lynn O'Malley (Gilbert), the niece of "Sandy" McTavish (Farnum) who runs the trading post.

Lee learns why this is good trapping country as the timber barons across the lake are ruthlessly cutting the trees and driving the animals across the river. The trappers appeal to him to take a petition to the Governor which would prohibit the timber people from coming to their side of the lake. At first, because he is a wanted man, he refuses, but does so later for the sake of the people, even though he knows it will lead to his arrest.

== Cast ==
- Robert Lowery as Lee Preston/Leland Bruce
- Helen Gilbert as Lynn O'Malley/McTavish
- William Farnum as Sandy McTavish
- Buster Keaton as Old Tarp/Mr. Boone
- Si Jenks as Timber Cross
- Stanley Andrews as Howard King
- Al Ferguson as Turk Monroe
- Trevor Bardette as White Cloud
- Estelita Zarco as River Squaw
- Ace the Wonder Dog as Ace
- Jimmy the Crow as Jim

== See also ==
- God's Country and the Law (1921)
- God's Country and the Woman (1937)
