= Adventures of Rusty =

1945 film by Paul Burnford

- Lobby card
- Directed by: Paul Burnford
- Written by: Al Martin
- Screenplay by: Aubrey Wisberg
- Produced by: Rudolph C. Flothow
- Starring: Ted Donaldson; Margaret Lindsay; Conrad Nagel
- Cinematography: L. William O'Connell
- Edited by: Reginald Browne
- Music by: Marlin Skiles
- Production company: Larry Darmour Productions
- Distributed by: Columbia Pictures
- Release date: September 6, 1945
- Running time: 67 minutes
- Country: United States
- Language: English

Adventures of Rusty is a 1945 American drama film, the first in the "Rusty" series of children's films. The series of eight films was made in the 1940s by Columbia Pictures with stories centered on Rusty, a German Shepherd dog. The film is notable for featuring the famous Ace the Wonder Dog as Rusty, the only appearance by Ace in the eight Rusty films. It was directed by Paul Burford.

== Plot ==
Danny Mitchell, a young boy in the American town of Lawtonville, is grieving over the loss of his dog. He is also struggling to adjust to his new stepmother, Ann, and has a difficult relationship with his father - causing him to call on Dr. Banning, a psychiatrist for assistance. However, Danny befriends Rusty, a ferocious German shepherd who was brought to the United States from Germany during World War II. Having worked a police dog for the Gestapo, however, Rusty is ill-tempered and Danny struggles to train him.

A subplot involves two Nazi saboteurs who arrive in Lawtonville, attempting to evade the Coast Guard and blow up an installation. They ultimately try to take Rusty by speaking to him in German.

== Cast ==
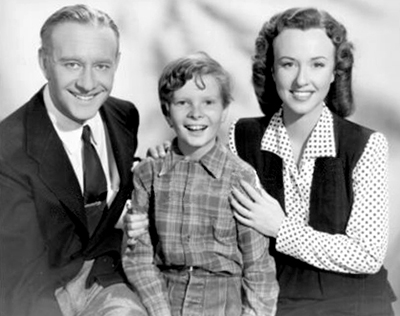
Conrad Nagel, Ted Donaldson and Margaret Lindsay in Adventures of Rusty

- Ted Donaldson as Danny Mitchell
- Margaret Lindsay as Ann Mitchell
- Conrad Nagel as Hugh Mitchell
- Gloria Holden as Louise Hover
- Robert Williams as Will Nelson
- Addison Richards as Dr. Banning, Psychiatrist
- Arno Frey as Tausig
- Eddie Parker as Ehrlich
- Ace the Wonder Dog as Rusty

=== Cast notes ===
The dog portraying Rusty would change over the course of the series, with Flame having the most appearances as the character. Danny's parents would also be portrayed by different actors in almost every installment.

== See also ==
- For the Love of Rusty
- Rusty (film series)
