= Criminal Lawyer (1951 film) =

1951 film by Seymour Friedman

- Directed by: Seymour Friedman
- Written by: Harold Greene
- Produced by: Rudolph C. Flothow
- Starring: Pat O'Brien; Jane Wyatt
- Cinematography: Philip Tannura
- Edited by: Charles Nelson
- Production company: Columbia Pictures
- Distributed by: Columbia Pictures
- Release date: August 23, 1951
- Running time: 73 minutes
- Country: United States
- Language: English

Criminal Lawyer is a 1951 American crime film noir directed by Seymour Friedman and starring Pat O'Brien and Jane Wyatt.

== Plot ==
An alcoholic attorney tries to maintain sobriety in order to defend a friend in a murder case.

== Cast ==
- Pat O'Brien as James Edward Reagan
- Jane Wyatt as Maggie Powell
- Carl Benton Reid as Tucker Bourne
- Mary Castle as Gloria Lydendecker
- Robert Shayne as Clark P. Sommers
- Mike Mazurki as "Moose" Hendricks
- Jerome Cowan as Walter Medford
- Marvin Kaplan as Sam Kutler
- Douglas Fowley as Harry Cheney
- Mickey Knox as Vincent Cheney
- Louis Jean Heydt as Frank Burnett

== See also ==
- List of American films of 1951

== Bibliography ==
- Blottner, Gene. Columbia Noir: A Complete Filmography, 1940-1962. McFarland, 2015.
