= Ace the Wonder Dog =

Dog actor

- Lobby card for Adventures of Rusty (1945), the first of eight "Rusty" films, and the only one starring Ace the Wonder Dog
- Species: Canis familiaris
- Breed: German Shepherd Dog
- Born: Before 1938
- Died: After 1946 (aged 8 or older)
- Occupation: Animal Actor

Ace the Wonder Dog was a German Shepherd dog actor in several films and film serials from 1938 to 1946. His first appearance was in the 1938 Lew Landers film Blind Alibi. He is considered by many critics an attempt by RKO Pictures to cash in on the success of Warner Bros.' canine sensation, Rin Tin Tin, also a German Shepherd.

After making several program pictures for RKO, Ace moved to Republic Pictures for several more projects, before moving to Columbia Pictures for a role as the Phantom's sidekick "Devil" in the serial The Phantom in 1943.

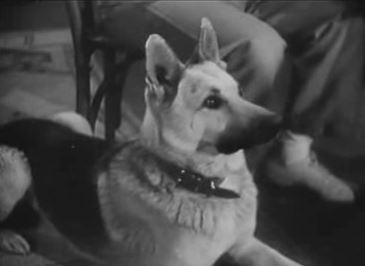
Ace the Wonder Dog in The Phantom chapter 1, (1943)

His declining popularity meant that most of his appearances after RKO's initial burst of "Ace" publicity were for Monogram and the Poverty Row studio Producers Releasing Corporation. In 1945, he appeared as "Rusty" in The Adventures of Rusty, the first of Columbia's eight "Rusty" films. He did not reprise the role in any of the subsequent installments.

Ace is just one of a number of "Wonder Dogs" in the history of fictional dogs. Others include Rin Tin Tin (billed during his 1930 radio show as "Rin Tin Tin, the Wonder Dog"), Pal the Wonder Dog, Gaspode the Wonder Dog, Rex the Wonder Dog from silent films, and another unrelated Rex the Wonder Dog from DC Comics. Ace presumptively died sometime after 1946.

== Filmography ==
- Blind Alibi (1938)
- Orphans of the Street (1938)
- Home on the Range (1938)
- Almost a Gentleman (aka Magnificent Outcast) (1939)
- The Rookie Cop (aka Swift Vengeance) (1939)
- Girl from God's Country (1940)
- The Girl from Alaska (1942)
- War Dogs (aka Pride of the Army, aka Unsung Heroes) (1942)
- Silent Witness (aka Attorney for the Defense) (1943)
- Headin' for God's Country (1943)
- The Phantom (1943)
- The Monster Maker (1944)
- Adventures of Rusty (1945)
- Danny Boy (1946)
- God's Country (1946)

== See also ==
- List of individual dogs
- List of animal actors
