= Rusty Leads the Way =

1948 film by Will Jason

- Directed by: Will Jason
- Written by: Arthur A. Ross; Nedrick Young; Al Martin
- Produced by: Robert Cohn; Wallace MacDonald
- Starring: Ted Donaldson; Sharyn Moffett; John Litel
- Cinematography: Vincent J. Farrar
- Edited by: James Sweeney
- Production company: Columbia Pictures
- Distributed by: Columbia Pictures
- Release date: October 21, 1948
- Running time: 59 minutes
- Country: United States
- Language: English

Rusty Leads the Way is a 1948 American drama film directed by Will Jason and starring Ted Donaldson, Sharyn Moffett and John Litel. It is part of the Rusty film series.

== Cast ==
- Ted Donaldson as Danny Mitchell
- Sharyn Moffett as Penny Waters
- John Litel as Hugh Mitchell
- Ann Doran as Ethel Mitchell
- Paula Raymond as Louise Adams
- Peggy Converse as Mrs. Waters
- Flame as Rusty

== Bibliography ==
- Blottner, Gene. Columbia Pictures Movie Series, 1926-1955: The Harry Cohn Years. McFarland, 2011.
