= Ted Donaldson =

American child actor (1933–2023)

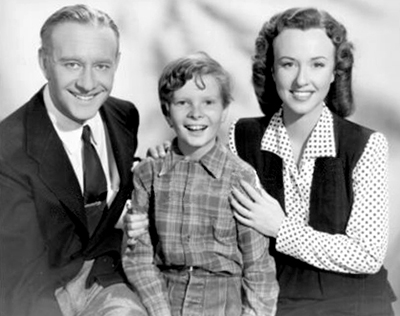
- Donaldson (center) with Conrad Nagel and Margaret Lindsay in Adventures of Rusty (1945)
- Born: August 20, 1933; New York City, U.S.
- Died: March 1, 2023 (aged 89); Los Angeles, California, U.S.
- Occupation: Actor
- Years active: 1937–1976

Ted Donaldson (August 20, 1933 – March 1, 2023) was an American actor.

== Early years ==
Born in Brooklyn, New York, Donaldson was the son of singer-composer Will Donaldson and Josephine M. Donaldson née Plant. His mother died when he was 4 1/2 months old. His stepmother was radio organist and composer Muriel Pollock. He attended the Professional Children's School in New York City.

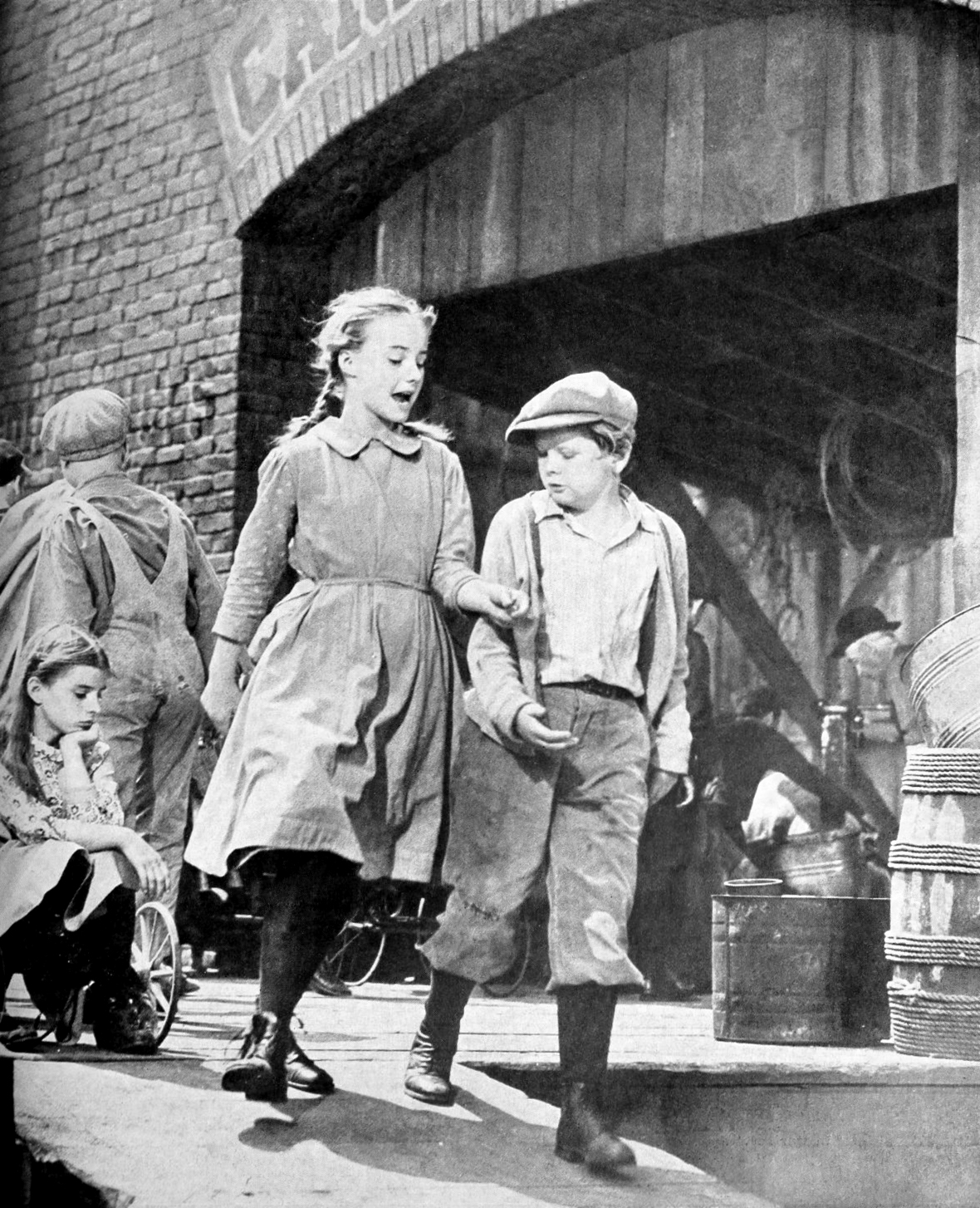
Peggy Ann Garner and Ted Donaldson in A Tree Grows in Brooklyn (1945)

== Career ==
Donaldson began his acting career in December 1937 when he appeared in an NBC radio show. In 1941, he played Tiny Tim in a week-long serialized version of Dickens' A Christmas Carol that was presented on Wheatena Playhouse.

As an 8-year-old, Donaldson portrayed Harlan in the Broadway stage production of Life With Father. In 1943, he performed alongside Gregory Peck in the play Sons and Soldiers.

The performance led to a starring role as Arthur "Pinky" Thompson in his first movie, Once Upon a Time (1944), opposite Cary Grant and Janet Blair. Columbia Pictures put him under contract after the film was finished. In 1945, Donaldson was cast in A Tree Grows in Brooklyn, which marked the directorial debut of Elia Kazan. Donaldson also starred as Danny Mitchell in the 1940s Rusty series of eight films about a German Shepherd dog.

From 1949 to 1954, he played Bud, the son of Robert Young's character in the radio version of Father Knows Best. He was offered the same role on the television version of the series, but turned it down, saying, "I didn't want to be typed. I didn't want to be a 21-year-old playing a 15- or 16-year-old kid. I wanted to do other things." As an adult, he recalled that as "one of the two or three most stupid things I have not done because not only would the salary have been very nice for five years, but the residuals would have also."

He retired from acting in 1976.

As an adult, Donaldson worked as an acting teacher and a bookseller. In his later years, Donaldson gave a number of interviews about his film career.

In January 2023, Donaldson suffered a fall in his Echo Park apartment. He died of complications from the fall on March 1, 2023, at the age of 89.

== Filmography ==
- Once Upon a Time (1944) as Arthur "Pinky" Thompson
- Mr. Winkle Goes to War (1944) as Barry
- A Tree Grows in Brooklyn (1945) as Neeley Nolan
- A Guy, a Gal and a Pal (1945)
- Adventures of Rusty (1945) as Danny Mitchell
- The Return of Rusty (1946)
- Personality Kid (1946)
- For the Love of Rusty (1947) as Danny Mitchell
- The Son of Rusty (1947)
- The Red Stallion (1947) as Joel Curtis
- My Pal (1947)
- Pal's Adventure (1948)
- My Dog Rusty (1948)
- Rusty Leads the Way (1948)
- The Decision of Christopher Blake (1948)
- Rusty Saves a Life (1949)
- The Green Promise (1949) as Phineas Matthews
- Rusty's Birthday (1949)
- Phone Call from a Stranger (1952)
- Flight Nurse (1953) (uncredited)
- Wiggle Your Ears (1956) (uncredited)

== Sources ==
- Holmstrom, John (1996). The Moving Picture Boy: An International Encyclopaedia from 1895 to 1995. Norwich: Michael Russell, pp. 184–185.
- Best, Marc (1971). Those Endearing Young Charms: Child Performers of the Screen. South Brunswick and New York: Barnes & Co. pp. 74–79.
