= There's One Born Every Minute =

1942 film by Harold Young

- Theatrical release poster
- Directed by: Harold Young
- Written by: Robert B. Hunt
- Produced by: Ken Goldsmith
- Starring: Hugh Herbert; Peggy Moran; Elizabeth Taylor
- Cinematography: John W. Boyle
- Edited by: Maurice Wright
- Music by: Frank Skinner
- Production company: Universal Studios
- Release date: June 26, 1942
- Running time: 60 minutes
- Country: United States
- Language: English

There's One Born Every Minute, also known as Man or Mouse, is a 1942 American comedy film directed by Harold Young. It was Elizabeth Taylor's first film and one of her only films with Universal Pictures.

The film is a comedy about false advertising. The Twine family profits from marketing their puddings as containing the fantastic Vitamin Z, with the press failing to realize that this vitamin does not exist. A local scientist is persuaded to act as a shill for their product.

== Plot ==
With a helpful push from his wife Minerva, Lemuel P. Twine, "Lem", decides to enter the scene of politics, by running a campaign as reform-mayor of his hometown Witumpka Falls. Normally he runs the Twine's Tasty Pudding Powder Company.

Lem is unaware that his financial backer, Lester Cadwalader Sr., wants him to run in order to secure that the current mayor, Moe Carson, is re-elected. When Lem's oldest daughter Helen Barbara is on her way to her date with Cadwalader's son Lester Jr., aka "Les", she accidentally bumps into her ex-boyfriend Jimmy Hanagan, who is just back from marketing studies at college.

Since Jimmy hasn't found work within his field of advertising yet, he is currently working as a clerk at the Cadwalader's general store. When Les sees Helen and Jimmy together he is jealous and end up firing Jimmy from the store. Instead Jimmy gets a job as advertising director for Helen's father's company. At work, Jimmy comes up with the idea of telling the consumers that the puddings are full of Vitamin Z, a made-up healthy ingredient. He goes on to persuade a local scientist, Asa Quiesenberry, to work with him on the marketing of the product, claiming the discovery of the new fantastic vitamin. The product is tested in a faux laboratory and the media is informed of the vitamin's superior qualities. Among other effects, it is said to enhance the female sexual appetite.

The pudding business sky-rockets and the small town is famous nationwide for the new "Zumf" vitamin products. Lem is awarded Witumpka Falls Man of the Year" by the town Chamber of Commerce, and in a newspaper interview with Minerva, she announces the engagement of Helen and Jimmy. These news all upset Les Jr. And Sr. greatly, and they start scheming a plan to ruin the Twine family and their business.

The Cadwaladers claim that the Vitamin Z disappears from the pudding powder after it has aged a while. After some intensive testing of old cases of powder, the Cadwaladers announce, at a dinner in Lem's honor, that they have found no trace of Zumf in the old pudding powder. They also claim Jimmy is a fraud and accuses him of bribing scientists to play along.

Humiliated, Jimmy leaves the Twine family. Lem continues his campaign for mayor and tells the people to elect him as a man, not as the leader of a pudding company. Jimmy returns after a while, and when he does he sees Helen reunited with Les, and becomes very jealous.

That night, Lem meets the ghost of his grandfather Claudius, emerging from a painted portrait on the wall. Claudius warns Lem of the Cadwaladers, and the morning after he meets Jimmy and Quisenberry to tell them about his dream.

When Lem tries to tell Moe Carson about Cadwalader's treacherous behavior, Les Sr arrives and a fistfight between him and Moe ensues. The Cadwaladers are exposed as traitors to the town, through flyers handed out by Jimmy and Helen, and Lem is elected mayor.

Lem urges Jimmy to reconcile with Helen, and he does, after giving her a lesson for getting back together with Les when he was gone. After they make up, Claudius watches them happily from his painting on the wall.

== Cast ==
- Hugh Herbert as Lemuel P. Twine / Abner Twine / Colonel Claudius Zebediah Twine
- Peggy Moran as Helen Barbara Twine
- Tom Brown as Jimmy Hanagan
- Guy Kibbee as Lester Cadwalader Sr.
- Catherine Doucet as Minerva Twine
- Edgar Kennedy as Mayor Moe Carson
- Gus Schilling as Professor Asa Quisenberry
- Elizabeth Taylor as Gloria Twine
- Charles Halton as Trumbull
- Renie Riano as Miss Aphrodite Phipps
- Carl "Alfalfa" Switzer as Junior Twine
- Mel Ruick as Radio Announcer
