= Rusty Saves a Life =

1949 film by Seymour Friedman

- Directed by: Seymour Friedman
- Written by: Brenda Weisberg; Al Martin
- Produced by: Wallace MacDonald
- Starring: Ted Donaldson; Gloria Henry; Stephen Dunne; John Litel
- Cinematography: Henry Freulich
- Edited by: Gene Havlick
- Production company: Columbia Pictures
- Distributed by: Columbia Pictures
- Release date: February 3, 1949
- Running time: 68 minutes
- Country: United States
- Language: English

Rusty Saves a Life is a 1949 American drama film directed by Seymour Friedman and starring Ted Donaldson, Gloria Henry and Ann Doran. It was part of the Rusty series of films produced by Columbia Pictures.

== Cast ==
- Ted Donaldson as Danny Mitchell
- Gloria Henry as Lyddy Hazard
- Stephen Dunne as Fred Gibson
- John Litel as Hugh Mitchell
- Ann Doran as Ethel Mitchell
- Thurston Hall as Counsellor Frank A. Gibson
- Rudy Robles as Gono Sandoval
- Flame as Rusty

== Bibliography ==
- Blottner, Gene. Columbia Pictures Movie Series, 1926-1955: The Harry Cohn Years. McFarland, 2011.
