= Seymour Friedman =

American film director

- Born: August 17, 1917; Detroit, Michigan; United States
- Died: April 2, 2003 (aged 85); Los Angeles, California; United States
- Occupation: Director

Seymour Friedman (August 17, 1917 – April 2, 2003) was an American film director. He later worked as a production manager in television. Friedman began his career as an assistant director, before enlisting for military service following America's entry into World War II. He directed his first film, Trapped by Boston Blackie, in 1948. Like many of the other films he directed, it was a low-budget series film. In the early 1950s, Friedman went to Britain to make a couple of films, before returning to Hollywood. He directed his last film in 1956, and switched to working entirely in television for several years.

== Filmography ==
- Trapped by Boston Blackie (1948)
- Rusty Saves a Life (1949)
- Bodyhold (1949)
- Prison Warden (1949)
- Chinatown at Midnight (1949)
- The Crime Doctor's Diary (1949)
- Rusty Saves a Life (1949)
- Customs Agent (1950)
- Counterspy Meets Scotland Yard (1950)
- The Son of Dr. Jekyll (1951)
- Her First Romance (1951)
- Criminal Lawyer (1951)
- Loan Shark (1952)
- Escape Route (1952)
- Flame of Calcutta (1953)
- The Saint's Return (1953)
- Khyber Patrol (1954)
- African Manhunt (1955)
- Secret of Treasure Mountain (1956)

== Bibliography ==
- Blottner, Gene. Columbia Pictures Movie Series, 1926-1955: The Harry Cohn Years. McFarland, 2011.
