= William Haade =

American actor (1903–1966)

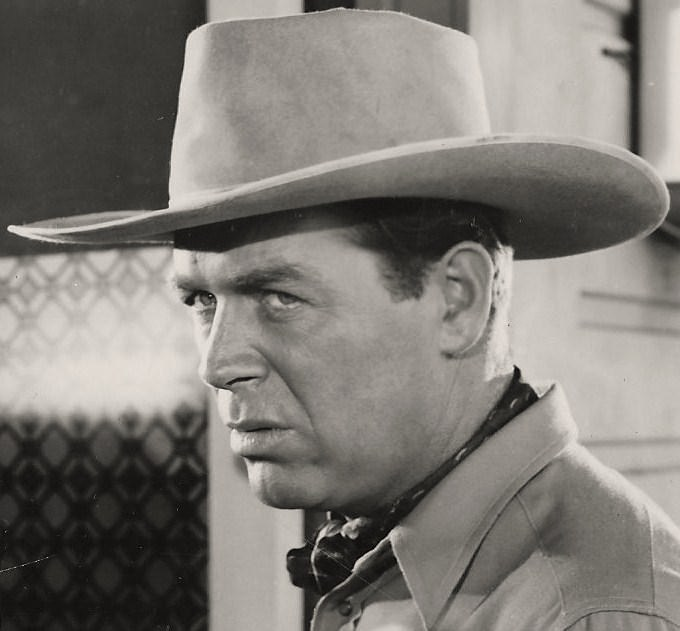
- Haade in a screenshot of Heart of the Golden West (1942)
- Born: March 2, 1903; New York City, U.S.
- Died: November 15, 1966 (aged 63); Los Angeles, California, U.S.
- Occupation: Actor
- Years active: 1937–1957

William Haade (March 2, 1904 or March 2, 1903 – November 15, 1966) was an American film actor. He appeared in more than 250 films between 1937 and 1957. He was born in New York City and died in Los Angeles, California.

== Early life ==
Born and raised in Manhattan, New York City, Haade was one of four children born to Bernard Francis Haade and Annie Kelly, one of whom died at the age of one in 1908. Following the death of his birth father in 1909, Haade's mother married William Bittner, resulting in the eventual acquisition of four additional half-siblings. He attended All Saints Parochial School and All Hallows Institute, and he served in the Navy for four years and three months.

== Career ==
Haade was a construction boss until he began acting, appearing in Iron Men (1936) on Broadway. A technical advisor to Norman Bel Geddes recommended Haade to his boss, who was seeking a fresh face for the play's lead.

Haade dismissed rumors that when Bel Geddes initially asked him about acting he immediately accepted and walked away from his tools. "That's a lot of bunk," he said. He did not take the offer seriously, responding, "Are you drunk or on hop?" When Bel Geddes telephoned Haades's wife, she promised to have him meet the people putting on the play. He complied, and "When they show me everything's on the up and up, and agree to pay me 200 smackers a week", he accepted the deal.

Screen tests resulted after motion-picture scouts were impressed with Haade's performance on Broadway, and the result was a contract for him with Warner Bros.

== Personal life and death ==
Haade was married once, to Anna R. Sincere. They had two sons, William Joseph and Edward John Haade.

Haade died on November 15, 1966.

== Selected filmography ==
- Kid Galahad (1937) - Chuck McGraw
- Telephone Operator (1937) - Heaver
- Missing Witnesses (1937) - Emmet White
- The Invisible Menace (1938) - Private Ferris
- Hollywood Stadium Mystery (1938) - Tommy Madison - the Champ
- Bulldog Drummond's Peril (1938) - Botulian's Driver (uncredited)
- He Couldn't Say No (1938) - Slug, a Gangster
- Three Comrades (1938) - Younger Vogt Man at Wrecked Car Scene (uncredited)
- My Bill (1938) - Piano Mover (uncredited)
- The Amazing Dr. Clitterhouse (1938) - Mrs. Updyke's Watchman (uncredited)
- The Texans (1938) - Sergeant Cahill (uncredited)
- Sing You Sinners (1938) - Pete
- If I Were King (1938) - Guy Tabarie
- Down on the Farm (1938) - Hefferkamp
- Shadows Over Shanghai (1938) - Captain Murphy
- Tom Sawyer, Detective (1938) - Jupiter Dunlap
- Persons in Hiding (1939) - First Mate (uncredited)
- Pardon Our Nerve (1939) - Daniels (uncredited)
- Union Pacific (1939) - Dusky Clayton
- Unmarried (1939) - Waiter (uncredited)
- The Gracie Allen Murder Case (1939) - Hotel Doorman (uncredited)
- Night Work (1939) - Mr. Turk
- Island of Lost Men (1939) - Hambly
- Full Confession (1939) - Moore
- $1,000 a Touchdown (1939) - Guard (uncredited)
- Sabotage (1939) - Minor Role (uncredited)
- Sued for Libel (1939) - Cooper, Pomeroy's Chauffeur (uncredited)
- Kid Nightingale (1939) - Rocky Snyder
- Rulers of the Sea (1939) - A Stoker
- Geronimo (1939) - McNeil
- Reno (1939) - George Fields
- Invisible Stripes (1939) - Shrank
- The Earl of Chicago (1940) - Crapshooter (uncredited)
- The Man Who Wouldn't Talk (1940) - First American (uncredited)
- The Grapes of Wrath (1940) - Deputy with Shotgun (uncredited)
- The Saint's Double Trouble (1940) - Helm Van Roon aka 'The Dutchman' (uncredited)
- The Man from Dakota (1940) - Union Soldier
- Adventure in Diamonds (1940) - Tattooed American Sailor (uncredited)
- Millionaire Playboy (1940) - Policeman (uncredited)
- Johnny Apollo (1940) - Guard During Break (uncredited)
- And One Was Beautiful (1940) - Prison Guard (uncredited)
- Bullet Code (1940) - Scar Atwood
- Lillian Russell (1940) - Soldier
- Sandy Is a Lady (1940) - Truck Driver
- Private Affairs (1940) - Strong-Arm Robber (uncredited)
- Stage to Chino (1940) - Slim
- They Drive By Night (1940) - Driver (uncredited)
- One Crowded Night (1940) - Joe
- Girl from Avenue A (1940) - Second Doorman (uncredited)
- Brigham Young (1940) - Skeptic (uncredited)
- Flowing Gold (1940) - Man Waiting for Job (uncredited)
- Knute Rockne All American (1940) - Worker (scenes deleted)
- Cherokee Strip (1940) - Grimes
- North West Mounted Police (1940) - Armorer (uncredited)
- Who Killed Aunt Maggie? (1940) - Trooper Curtis
- Dr. Kildare's Crisis (1940) - Guirk, Man in Fistfight (uncredited)
- Robin Hood of the Pecos (1941) - Captain Jeff Morgan
- The Round Up (1941) - Frane Battles
- The Penalty (1941) - Van
- In Old Cheyenne (1941) - Davidge
- Men of Boys Town (1941) - Jake, Reform School Guard (uncredited)
- The People vs. Dr. Kildare (1941) - Iron Worker at Mike's (uncredited)
- Affectionately Yours (1941) - Matthews
- Pirates on Horseback (1941) - Henchman Bill Watson
- Desert Bandit (1941) - Largo
- Man Hunt (1941) - Third Sentry (uncredited)
- Hurry, Charlie, Hurry (1941) - Policeman in Park (uncredited)
- Kansas Cyclone (1941) - Sheriff Ed King
- Sergeant York (1941) - Card Player (uncredited)
- Accent on Love (1941) - Court Attendant (uncredited)
- Dance Hall (1941) - Moon
- The Shepherd of the Hills (1941) - Bald Knobber (uncredited)
- Citadel of Crime (1941) - Turk
- Unfinished Business (1941) - Drill Sergeant (uncredited)
- Sailors on Leave (1941) - Sawyer
- Honky Tonk (1941) - Heckler in Church (uncredited)
- Married Bachelor (1941) - Angry Husband (uncredited)
- Rise and Shine (1941) - Butch
- You're in the Army Now (1941) - Sergeant Thorpe
- Don't Get Personal (1942) - Burly Man Beach Bully (uncredited)
- Man from Cheyenne (1942) - Ed
- Right to the Heart (1942) - Morgan
- Torpedo Boat (1942) - Big Sweeney, Riveter
- Heart of the Rio Grande (1942) - Hap Callahan
- Reap the Wild Wind (1942) - 'Jubilee' Second Mate (uncredited)
- To the Shores of Tripoli (1942) - Truck Driver (uncredited)
- Shepherd of the Ozarks (1942) - Dudd Hitt
- Gang Busters (1942, Serial) - Mike Taboni
- A Gentleman After Dark (1942) - Policeman
- You're Telling Me (1942) - Doorman (uncredited)
- The Spoilers (1942) - Deputy Joe (uncredited)
- Dr. Broadway (1942) - Dynamo (uncredited)
- Juke Girl (1942) - Watchman
- Maisie Gets Her Man (1942) - Bonecrusher (uncredited)
- Jackass Mail (1942) - Red Gargan
- Just Off Broadway (1942) - Warehouse Watchman
- Iceland (1942) - Sentry (uncredited)
- The Navy Comes Through (1942) - Pier 7 Guard (uncredited)
- I Married a Witch (1942) - Policeman at Ambulance (uncredited)
- Heart of the Golden West (1942) - Cully Bronson - Henchman
- Star Spangled Rhythm (1942) - Marine Sergeant Duffy (uncredited)
- Pittsburgh (1942) - Johnny
- How's About It (1943) - Attendant (uncredited)
- Hangmen Also Die! (1943) - Mildrad (uncredited)
- She Has What It Takes (1943) - Cop (uncredited)
- Daredevils of the West (1943, Serial) - Barton Ward - Henchman
- Dr. Gillespie's Criminal Case (1943) - Butch - Prison Driver (uncredited)
- Days of Old Cheyenne (1943) - Big Bill Harmon
- Action in the North Atlantic (1943) - Loudmouth Saloon Patron (uncredited)
- Two Tickets to London (1943) - Groves (uncredited)
- Song of Texas (1943) - Fred Calvert
- Salute to the Marines (1943) - M.P. Sergeant (uncredited)
- The Adventures of a Rookie (1943) - Army Sergeant on Ship (uncredited)
- Adventures of the Flying Cadets (1943, Serial) - Instructor (uncredited)
- Dangerous Blondes (1943) - Pugnacious Man (uncredited)
- Thank Your Lucky Stars (1943) - Finchley the Butler (uncredited)
- A Scream in the Dark (1943) - Gerald Messenger
- You're a Lucky Fellow, Mr. Smith (1943) - Soldier (uncredited)
- Minesweeper (1943) - Bosun (uncredited)
- The Dancing Masters (1943) - Truck Driver (uncredited)
- There's Something About a Soldier (1943) - Larsky (uncredited)
- Whistling in Brooklyn (1943) - Police Sergeant (uncredited)
- Sing a Jingle (1944) - Announcer (uncredited)
- Timber Queen (1944) - Rawson (uncredited)
- Buffalo Bill (1944) - Barber (uncredited)
- Seven Days Ashore (1944) - Bosun's Mate (uncredited)
- Slightly Terrific (1944) - Olaf (uncredited)
- The Adventures of Mark Twain (1944) - Steam Room Chief (uncredited)
- Show Business (1944) - Stagehand (uncredited)
- 3 Men in White (1944) - Policeman (uncredited)
- Roger Touhy, Gangster (1944) - Carl - Truck Driver (uncredited)
- Man from Frisco (1944) - Brooklyn (uncredited)
- The Yellow Rose of Texas (1944) - Buster
- Bride by Mistake (1944) - Guard (uncredited)
- An American Romance (1944) - Passerby at Music Teacher's Home (uncredited)
- I Won't Play (1944, Short) - Chicago
- Here Come the Waves (1944) - Chief Petty Officer (uncredited)
- Sheriff of Las Vegas (1944) - Dan Sedley
- Bring On the Girls (1945) - Chief Petty Officer (uncredited)
- The Master Key (1945, Serial) - Abandoned Warehouse Thug (uncredited)
- Honeymoon Ahead (1945) - Trigger
- Pillow to Post (1945) - Big Joe - Loolie's Drunken Date (uncredited)
- The Frozen Ghost (1945) - Policeman on Dock (uncredited)
- I'll Tell the World (1945) - Joe (uncredited)
- Nob Hill (1945) - Big Tim, El Dorado Owner (uncredited)
- Incendiary Blonde (1945) - Mug with Cadden (uncredited)
- Pride of the Marines (1945) - Man at Bus Stop (uncredited)
- Phantom of the Plains (1945) - Ace Hanlon
- The Royal Mounted Rides Again (1945) - Archer
- Dakota (1945) - Roughneck in Saloon (uncredited)
- Fallen Angel (1945) - 1st Bus Driver (uncredited)
- The Stork Club (1945) - Army Sergeant Dancing with Judy (uncredited)
- A Guy Could Change (1946) - Hank Krane
- The Gentleman Misbehaves (1946) - Officer (uncredited)
- Sentimental Journey (1946) - Bus Driver (uncredited)
- The Well-Groomed Bride (1946) - MP (uncredited)
- Valley of the Zombies (1946) - Police Officer 'Tiny'
- In Old Sacramento (1946) - Claim Jumper (uncredited)
- Renegades (1946) - Bert, Gunman (uncredited)
- My Pal Trigger (1946) - Davis
- Gentleman Joe Palooka (1946) - Goon Leader (uncredited)
- The Magnificent Rogue (1946) - Cop (uncredited)
- Affairs of Geraldine (1946) - Wayne Cooper
- Bringing Up Father (1946) - Tillie O'Toole (uncredited)
- Lady Chaser (1946) - Bill Redding
- The Pilgrim Lady (1947) - Cab Driver
- It Happened in Brooklyn (1947) - Police Sergeant
- Buck Privates Come Home (1947) - Eustice (Laundry Woman's Husband) (uncredited)
- Blaze of Noon (1947) - Man in Speakeasy (uncredited)
- The Web (1947) - Plainclothesman (uncredited)
- The Trouble with Women (1947) - Cap (uncredited)
- Deep Valley (1947) - Guard (uncredited)
- The Secret Life of Walter Mitty (1947) - Conductor (uncredited)
- Down to Earth (1947) - Spike
- Exposed (1947) - Iggy Broty
- Unconquered (1947) - Trapper at Ball (uncredited)
- Magic Town (1947) - Moving Man with Wastebasket (uncredited)
- Where There's Life (1947) - Jimmy O'Brien (uncredited)
- Big Town After Dark (1947) - Marcus
- Under Colorado Skies (1947) - Marlowe
- The Inside Story (1948) - Rocky
- April Showers (1948) - Mike's Bartender (uncredited)
- The Emperor Waltz (1948) - Guard Officer (uncredited)
- Shaggy (1948) - Gonnell
- Lulu Belle (1948) - Duke Weaver (uncredited)
- Tap Roots (1948) - Mob Leader (uncredited)
- Key Largo (1948) - Ralph Feeney
- Four Faces West (1948) - Poker Player #1
- Michael O'Halloran (1948) - Detective Benson
- Night Has a Thousand Eyes (1948) - Gowan (uncredited)
- For the Love of Mary (1948) - (uncredited)
- Good Sam (1948) - Taxi Driver (scenes deleted)
- A Song Is Born (1948) - Detective from D.A.'s Office (uncredited)
- Incident (1948) - Police Desk Sergeant (uncredited)
- Strike It Rich (1948) - Bull
- That Wonderful Urge (1948) - Herman (uncredited)
- Last of the Wild Horses (1948) - Henchman Rocky Rockford
- Alaska Patrol (1949) - Anorus
- The Bribe (1949) - Walker (uncredited)
- Knock on Any Door (1949) - Police Sergeant (uncredited)
- Flamingo Road (1949) - Burr Lassen (uncredited)
- The Doolins of Oklahoma (1949) - Emmett Dalton (uncredited)
- Night Unto Night (1949) - Guy Morell, Man in Art Museum (uncredited)
- The Fountainhead (1949) - Worker (uncredited)
- Any Number Can Play (1949) - Frank, a Dealer (uncredited)
- The Wyoming Bandit (1949) - Lonnigan - Henchman
- Scene of the Crime (1949) - Lafe Douque
- The Gal Who Took the West (1949) - Lee's Man (uncredited)
- The Woman on Pier 13 (1949) - Worker Being Laid Off (uncredited)
- Malaya (1949) - Ship Captain (uncredited)
- Ambush (1950) - Joe - Guard (uncredited)
- No Man of Her Own (1950) - Policeman (uncredited)
- Outcast of Black Mesa (1950) - Dayton
- Rock Island Trail (1950) - Morrow's Henchman (uncredited)
- Father of the Bride (1950) - Policeman (uncredited)
- The Asphalt Jungle (1950) - Bill - Cop Outside Diner (uncredited)
- Hi-Jacked (1950) - Highway Patrol Inspector (uncredited)
- Trial Without Jury (1950) - Kennedy - Truck Driver
- The Old Frontier (1950) - Henchman Pills
- Triple Trouble (1950) - Arresting Policeman (uncredited)
- Copper Canyon (1950) - Laughing Poker Game Bystander (uncredited)
- Joe Palooka in the Squared Circle (1950) - Robert 'Bubbles' Conway
- Hunt the Man Down (1950) - Bart (uncredited)
- Three Desperate Men (1951) - Bill Devlin
- A Yank in Korea (1951) - Corporal Jawolski
- Oh! Susanna (1951) - Trooper Riorty
- Rawhide (1951) - Gil Scott (uncredited)
- Stop That Cab (1951) - Onslow
- Santa Fe (1951) - Union Veteran (uncredited)
- Buckaroo Sheriff of Texas (1951) - Henchman Mark Brannigan
- The Texas Rangers (1951) - Guard on Train (uncredited)
- Leave It to the Marines (1951) - Recruiting Sergeant Delaney
- The Sea Hornet (1951) - Condor
- Here Come the Nelsons (1952) - Bully (uncredited)
- Rancho Notorious (1952) - Sheriff Sam Bullock (uncredited)
- And Now Tomorrow (1952)
- Skirts Ahoy! (1952) - Bosun's Mate (uncredited)
- Carson City (1952) - Hardrock Haggerty
- Bonzo Goes to College (1952) - Tom, Truck Driver (uncredited)
- Kansas City Confidential (1952) - Detective Mullins (uncredited)
- Come Back, Little Sheba (1952) - Interne (uncredited)
- San Antone (1953) - Yankee Sergeant (uncredited)
- The Blue Gardenia (1953) - Patrolman Hopper (uncredited)
- The Affairs of Dobie Gillis (1953) - Police Captain (uncredited)
- Red River Shore (1953) - Link - Henchman
- The Great Diamond Robbery (1954) - Mike, the Policeman (uncredited)
- Jubilee Trail (1954) - Jake - Sailor (uncredited)
- Untamed Heiress (1954) - Friend
- Silver Lode (1954) - Searcher at Dolly's Door (uncredited)
- Toughest Man Alive (1955)
- Abbott and Costello Meet the Keystone Kops (1955) - Hobo (uncredited)
- Many Rivers to Cross (1955) - The Constable (uncredited)
- The Road to Denver (1955) - Bartender #1 (uncredited)
- Alfred Hitchcock Presents (1956) (Season 1 Episode 20: "And So Died Riabouchinska") - Stagehand
- Spoilers of the Forest (1957) - Loader (uncredited)
- She Devil (1957) - Police Detective (uncredited)
- The Tall Stranger (1957) - Cattle Thief (uncredited)
- Revolt in the Big House (1958) - Guard (uncredited)
