= Ten Cents a Dance (film) =

Ten Cents a Dance is the title of several films:

- Ten Cents a Dance (1931 film), starring Barbara Stanwyck and Ricardo Cortez
- Ten Cents a Dance (1945 film), starring Jane Frazee
- Ten Cents a Dance: Parallax, a 1985 film by Midi Onodera
