= Cowboy Blues =

1946 film by Ray Nazarro

- Theatrical release poster
- Directed by: Ray Nazarro
- Screenplay by: J. Benton Cheney
- Produced by: Colbert Clark
- Starring: Ken Curtis; Jeff Donnell; Guy Kibbee; Guinn "Big Boy" Williams; Isabel Randolph; Mark Roberts; Peg LaCentra
- Cinematography: George F. Kelley
- Edited by: Jerome Thoms
- Production company: Columbia Pictures
- Distributed by: Columbia Pictures
- Release date: July 18, 1946
- Running time: 62 minutes
- Country: United States
- Language: English

Cowboy Blues is a 1946 American Western film directed by Ray Nazarro and written by J. Benton Cheney. The film stars Ken Curtis, Jeff Donnell, Guy Kibbee, Guinn "Big Boy" Williams, Isabel Randolph, Mark Roberts and Peg LaCentra. The film was released on July 18, 1946, by Columbia Pictures.

== Cast ==
- Ken Curtis as Curt Durant
- Jeff Donnell as Susan Nelson
- Guy Kibbee as Dusty Nelson
- Guinn "Big Boy" Williams as Big Boy Stover
- Isabel Randolph as Mrs. Winston
- Mark Roberts as Jerome Winston
- Peg LaCentra as Lucy Armstrong
- Deuce Spriggins as Band Leader Deuce
- Carolina Cotton as Carolina
