= Jimmy Lloyd (actor) =

American actor (1918–1988)

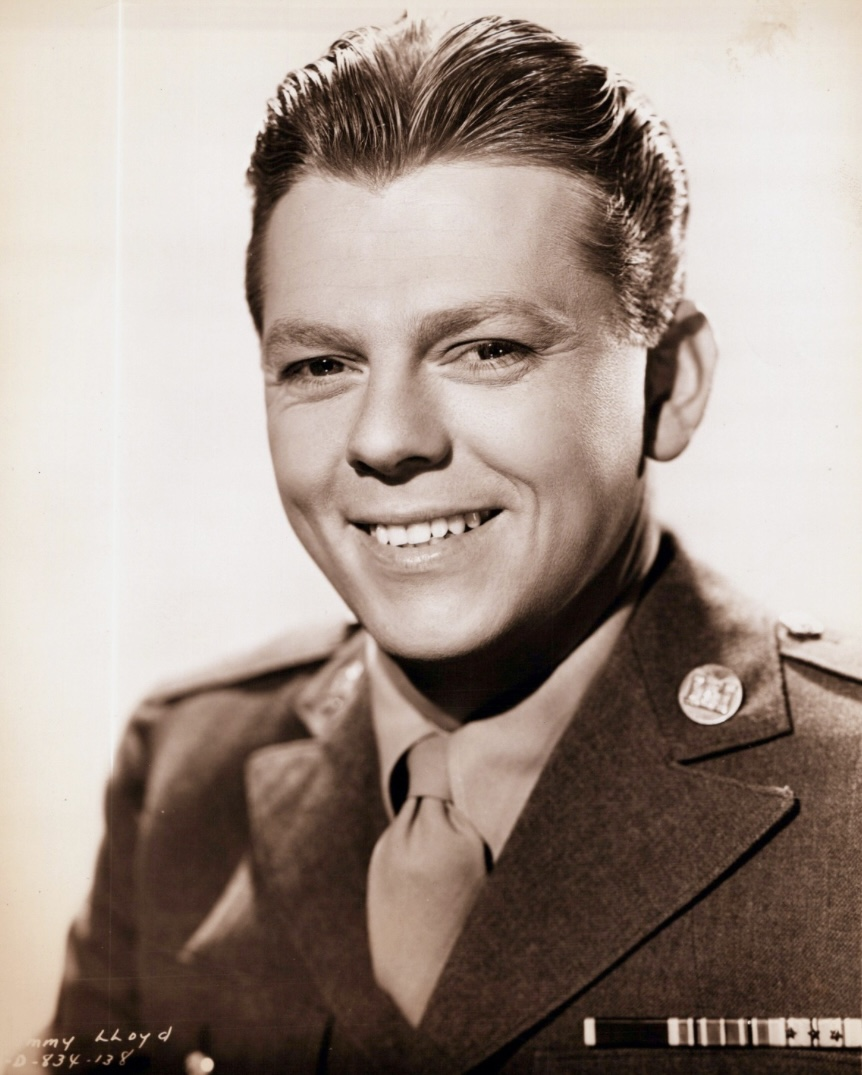
- Lloyd in 1945
- Born: James Lloyd; November 3, 1918; Bettendorf, Iowa, U.S.
- Died: August 26, 1988 (aged 69); Medford, Oregon, U.S.
- Occupations: Film and television actor

James "Jimmy" Lloyd (November 3, 1918 – August 26, 1988) was an American actor who played Tex in the 1947 film serial The Sea Hound.

== Early years ==
Lloyd was born in Bettendorf, Iowa. Growing up, he lived in Kansas City, where he was a student at George B. Longan Elementary School and Westport High School. His career began when he did stand-up comedy in floor shows in Kansas City. He went to Hollywood in 1944.

== Career ==
Lloyd made 40 films while he was under contract to Columbia studios, and he made more than 120 appearances on television. He became a producer and personal manager, operating Jimmy Lloyd Productions, Incorporated. Based in Hollywood, the company provided "career motivation ... for career-minded children from 3 to 19 years old."

== Personal life and death ==
Lloyd and his wife, Lucille, had two sons and two daughters. He died in a hospital in Medford, Oregon, on August 26, 1988, aged 69.

== Partial filmography ==
- Blondie (1938)
- When Johnny Comes Marching Home (1942) – Sailor (uncredited)
- She's a Sweetheart (1944) – Pete Ryan
- Together Again (1944) – Master of Ceremonies (uncredited)
- Let's Go Steady (1945) – Henry McCoy
- Ten Cents a Dance (1945) – Billy Sparks
- The Story of G.I. Joe (1945) – Private Spencer
- I Love a Bandleader (1945) – Assistant Band Leader (uncredited)
- Snafu (1945) – Danny Baker
- The Bandit of Sherwood Forest (1946) – Crossbowman (uncredited)
- The Gentleman Misbehaves (1946) – Jimmy Drake
- Talk About a Lady (1946) – Reporter (uncredited)
- Night Editor (1946) – Clerk (uncredited)
- Gallant Journey (1946) – Dan Mahoney / Prof. LaSalle
- It's Great to Be Young (1946) – Ricky Malone
- The Jolson Story (1946) – Roy Anderson (uncredited)
- Cigarette Girl (1947) – Joe Atkins
- The Sea Hound (1947, Serial) – Tex
- Key Witness (1947) – Larry Summers
- Two Blondes and a Redhead (1947) – Tommy Randell
- Glamour Girl (1948) – Buddy Butterfield
- My Dog Rusty (1948) – Rodney Pyle
- The Fuller Brush Man (1948) – Williams (uncredited)
- Walk a Crooked Mile (1948) – FBI Agent Alison (uncredited)
- The Return of October (1948) – Man at Racetrack (uncredited)
- The Dark Past (1948) – Herb Fuller (uncredited)
- Slightly French (1949) – Assistant (uncredited)
- Shockproof (1949) – Clerk (uncredited)
- Riders of the Whistling Pines (1949) – Forester Joe
- Manhattan Angel (1949) – Elmer
- Miss Grant Takes Richmond (1949) – Homer White (uncredited)
- Mary Ryan, Detective (1949) – Detective Gordon (uncredited)
- Hokus Pokus (1949, a Three Stooges film)
- Blondie's Hero (1950) – Cpl. Bill Touhey (uncredited)
- Beauty on Parade (1950) – Johnny Fennell
- David Harding, Counterspy (1950) – Burton (uncredited)
- When You're Smiling (1950) – Dave
- Counterspy Meets Scotland Yard (1950) – Agent Burton
- Gasoline Alley (1951) – Harry Dorsey
- Lullaby of Broadway (1951) – Reporter (uncredited)
- Fighting Coast Guard (1951) – Upper Classman (uncredited)
- G.I. Jane (1951) – Lt. B.B. Bradford
- Joe Palooka in Triple Cross (1951) – Bill, Reporter
- All That I Have (1951) – Reporter Noonan
- Venture of Faith (1951)
- The Beast from 20,000 Fathoms (1953) – Soldier (uncredited)
- Calamity Jane (1953) – Officer at Fort Dance (uncredited)
- The Battle of Rogue River (1954) – Pvt. Hanley (uncredited)
- A Touch of Larceny (1960)
- The Love-Ins (1967) – Mr. Henning
- Who's Minding the Mint? (1967) – Garbage Man (uncredited) (final film role)
