= The Gift of Love =

1958 film by Jean Negulesco

- Directed by: Jean Negulesco
- Screenplay by: Luther Davis
- Based on: The Little Horse (1944 Good Housekeeping story) by Nelia Gardner White
- Produced by: Charles Brackett
- Starring: Lauren Bacall; Robert Stack
- Cinematography: Milton R. Krasner
- Edited by: Hugh S. Fowler
- Music by: Cyril J. Mockridge; Alfred Newman
- Production company: 20th Century Fox
- Distributed by: 20th Century Fox
- Release date: February 11, 1958
- Running time: 105 minutes
- Country: United States
- Language: English
- Budget: $1,215,000

The Gift of Love is a 1958 American CinemaScope drama romance film directed by Jean Negulesco and starring Lauren Bacall and Robert Stack.

The film's screenplay was based on the short story "The Little Horse" by Nelia Gardner White, originally published in a 1944 issue of Good Housekeeping, and previously made into the film Sentimental Journey (1946), with John Payne and Maureen O'Hara.

== Plot ==
A brilliant scientist, Bill Beck, ends up happily married to Julie, his doctor's receptionist. Five years after their wedding, the same doctor treats Julie for a heart condition that she decides to keep secret from her husband, who is doing serious work as a physicist developing guided missiles.

Not wishing him to be left alone if she dies, Julie suggests they adopt a child. An orphan called Hitty has been rejected many times, but Julie takes a shine to her. Bill, a pragmatist, does not understand the little girl's fantasy world, and he is angered when Hitty, meaning well, erases a chalkboard, wiping out days of Bill's hard work.

Bill's superior at work, Grant Allan, urges him to give the girl more patience and time, but the Becks believe it could be best that Hitty be returned to the orphanage. Julie's heart gives out. After her death, Hitty tries to win over her heartbroken foster father, but Bill is inconsolable.

Hitty is returned to the orphanage. She goes missing one night and is caught in a storm. Bill and Grant hurry there to assist in a search, and when they find Hitty and save her, Bill realizes he never wants to be apart from her again.

== Cast ==
- Lauren Bacall as Julie Beck
- Robert Stack as William "Bill" Beck
- Evelyn Rudie as Hitty
- Lorne Greene as Grant Allan
- Anne Seymour as Miss McMasters
- Edward Platt as Dr. Jim Miller
- Joseph Kearns as Mr. Rynicker

== See also ==
- List of American films of 1958
