= Mark Roberts (actor) =

American actor (1921–2006)

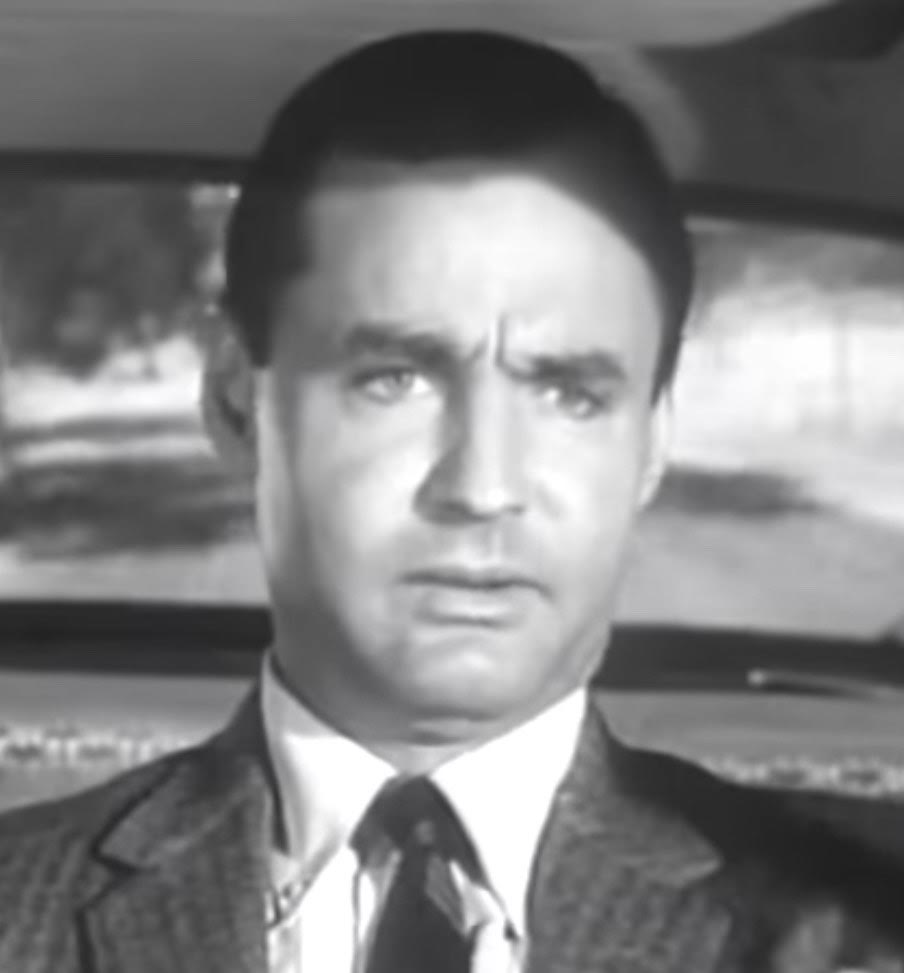
- Roberts in an episode of One Step Beyond (1960)
- Born: Robert Ellis Scott; June 9, 1921; Denver, Colorado, U.S.
- Died: January 5, 2006 (aged 84); Los Angeles, California, U.S.
- Other names: Bob Scott; Robert E. Scott; Robert Scott
- Occupation: Actor
- Years active: 1938–1994
- Spouses: Audrey von Clemm (m. 1953; div. 1967) Emmaline Henry (m. 1969; div. 1974)
- Children: 3

Robert Ellis Scott (June 9, 1921 – January 5, 2006) was an American stage, film and television actor who appeared in over 100 films between 1938 and 1994. Sometimes he was credited as Mark Roberts, Bob Scott, Robert E. Scott, or Robert Scott.

== Early years ==
A native of Denver, Colorado, Roberts began acting when he was four, appearing in a play in kindergarten. "The smell of greasepaint got me", he said years later. During his childhood, the family moved to Lakewood, Ohio, and later to Kansas City, Missouri. Roberts attended Southwest High School in Kansas City and the University of Arizona at Tucson, where he majored in English.

== Film ==
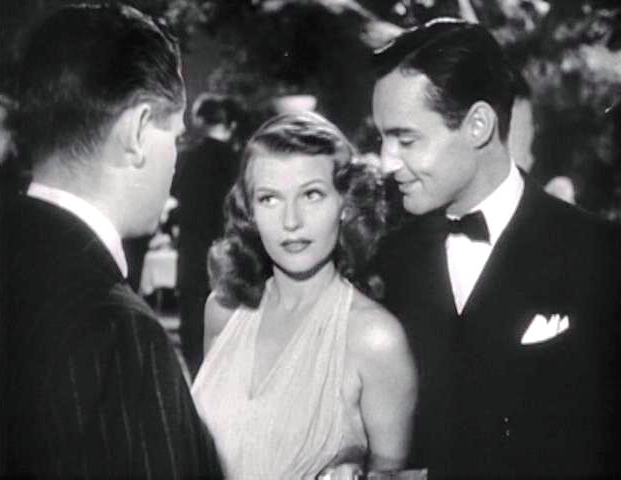
Mark Roberts (far right) with Rita Hayworth in a trailer for Gilda (1946)

Soon after Roberts graduated from college, a screen test at Columbia Pictures led to a long-term contract for him.

He made his film debut in Brother Rat, a 1938 film directed by William Keighley and starring Ronald Reagan. Roberts played an uncredited bit role as Tripod Andrews. After that, he was billed as Robert Scott in three films before obtaining his first and only leading role in the 1944 Columbia serial Black Arrow. He also served in the United States Army Air Forces during World War II. Following discharge, he acted under the name of Mark Roberts.

Roberts appeared (uncredited) in It's a Wonderful Life, the 1946 classic Frank Capra film. He and Carl (Alfalfa) Switzer played Mickey and Freddie Othello, respectively, the two guys who unlock the gym floor at the high school dance, exposing the pool below, into which George Bailey (James Stewart) and Mary Hatch (Donna Reed) tumble.

== Stage ==
Roberts played the role of Dunbar in the Broadway production of Stalag 17 (1951). Concurrently, he was a member of the cast of Miss Susan, a television serial. The dual responsibilities meant that Roberts usually left New York City via train at 8 a.m., going to Philadelphia for rehearsals and the program's live broadcast, then he would catch a 6:06 p.m. train back to New York to perform in the play.

== Television ==
Roberts later became a familiar face in selected drama and action television series. He starred as reporter Hildy Johnson in the 1949-1950 syndicated television series The Front Page. In the 1960–1961 season, he joined Stephen Dunne (1918–1977) playing brothers who were private detectives in the syndicated television series, The Brothers Brannagan, which aired 39 episodes. Roberts played Bob Brannagan; Dunne, Mike Brannagan. He made seven guest appearances on Perry Mason, including two 1962 roles as the murder victim: title character Otto Gervaert/Gabe Phillips in "The Case of the Absent Artist," and Tod Richards in "The Case of the Playboy Pugilist." He portrayed murderer Wayne Jameson in "The Case of the Nebulous Nephew". Mark Roberts appeared in Barnaby Jones portraying a character named Tony Bloom; episode titled, "Perchance to Kill"(03/11/1973).

Roberts made his last screen appearance in the short-lived 1994 sitcom Monty.

== Personal life ==
Roberts married Audrey Von Clemm in Philadelphia, Pennsylvania, in 1953. The couple had three children—Col. Ward E. Scott II, Margot Silverman, and Jeffrey F. Scott—before divorcing in 1967.

Roberts married I Dream of Jeannie actress Emmaline Henry on November 1, 1969. Scott and Henry divorced in 1974.

== Death ==
Roberts died at the age of 84 in Los Angeles, California on January 5, 2006. He was survived by his three children and his wife, Jane Cole Scott (married 1981).

== Selected filmography ==
=== Films ===
- Brother Rat (1938) - Tripod Andrews (uncredited)
- The Escape (1939) - Mickey (uncredited)
- Those Were the Days! (1940) - Allison
- Remember Pearl Harbor (1942) - Marine (uncredited)
- The Girl in the Case (1944) - Tommy Rockwood (uncredited)
- Black Arrow (1944, Serial) - Black Arrow
- One Mysterious Night (1944) - George Daley
- The Crime Doctor's Courage (1945) - Bob Rencoret
- Ten Cents a Dance (1945) - Ted Kimball, III
- Prison Ship (1945) - Maj. Trevor
- Life with Blondie (1945) - Montana (uncredited)
- Out of the Depths (1945) - 'Pills' Wilkins
- A Close Call for Boston Blackie (1946) - John Peyton (uncredited)
- The Notorious Lone Wolf (1946) - Dick Hale
- The Bandit of Sherwood Forest (1946) - Robin Hood's Man
- Gilda (1946) - Gabe Evans
- Talk About a Lady (1946) - Reporter (uncredited)
- The Unknown (1946) - Reed Cawthorne
- Cowboy Blues (1946) - Jerry Winston
- Shadowed (1946) - Mark Bellaman
- It's a Wonderful Life (1946) - Mickey (uncredited)
- Dead Reckoning (1947) - Bandleader (uncredited)
- Prairie Raiders (1947) - Bronc Masters
- Exposed (1947) - William Foresman III
- The Invisible Wall (1947) - Bellhop (uncredited)
- The Bride Goes Wild (1948) - Piute (uncredited)
- Shed No Tears (1948) - Ray Belden
- Michael O'Halloran (1948) - Pete
- The Blonde Bandit (1950) - Airport Mechanic
- Call Me Mister (1951) - Sergeant to Chief of Staff (uncredited)
- The Unknown Man (1951) - Reporter (uncredited)
- The Pride of St. Louis (1952)
- Just for You (1952) - Reporter (uncredited)
- Off Limits (1952) - Non-Com (uncredited)
- Taxi (1953) - Jim Turner
- Ma and Pa Kettle on Vacation (1953) - Teddy Kettle (uncredited)
- Pony Express (1953) - Pony Express Rider (uncredited)
- The Buster Keaton Story (1957)
- The Sad Sack (1957) - Sergeant (uncredited)
- Onionhead (1958) - Lt. J.G. Bennett
- Last Train from Gun Hill (1959) - Train Conductor (uncredited)
- The Money Jungle (1967) - Joe Diguseppe
- The Girl Who Knew Too Much (1969) - Stephen Kasai
- Posse (1975) - Mr. Cooper
- Jacqueline Susann's Once Is Not Enough (1975) - Rheingold
- Spontaneous Combustion (1990) - Dr. Simpson

=== Television ===
- Kraft Television Theatre (1949–1958) - Kelly / Pete Redfield / Adam Smith
- Miss Susan (1951) - Bill Carter (1951)
- Three Steps to Heaven (1953) - Bill Morgan #1
- The Philco Television Playhouse (1954)
- Studio One (1954) - David Thorpe
- Robert Montgomery Presents (1955)
- The Alcoa Hour (1955) - Dr. Emmett
- Letter to Loretta (1956–1960)
- Cheyenne (1957) - Boyd Copeland
- Gunsmoke (1957) - Joel Adams
- Perry Mason (1957–1965) - Customer in restaurant / Irving Florian / Ben Scott / Wayne Jameson / Tod Richards / Otto Gervaert / Gabe Phillips / James Castleton / Bob Kimber
- The Millionaire (1958) - Bob Harris
- Richard Diamond, Private Detective (1958, Episode: "Bungalow Murder" ) - Rod Leighton
- M Squad (1959) - Joey Devon
- 77 Sunset Strip (1959) - Johnny Liston / Harry Orrwitt
- Alcoa Presents: One Step Beyond (1960) - Pete Rankin
- Surfside 6 (1961) - Ted Walters
- The Brothers Brannagan (1960–1961) - Bob Brannagan / Bill Brannagan
- Adventures in Paradise (1961) - Ralph Harris
- Follow the Sun (1962) - Howard Ramsey
- General Hospital (1963) - Charles Sutton (1982)
- The Outer Limits (1963, Episode: "The Hundred Days of the Dragon") - Bob Conner
- 12 O'Clock High (1966) - Maj. John Davidson
- The F.B.I. (1966–1972) - Ernest Malloy / SAC Murray Davis / SAC Owen Clark / SRA Will Channahon / SAC Johnson / SAC Warren Berwick / Howard Schaal
- The Invaders (1967) - Dr. Sam Larousse
- Ironside (1968) - Jim Hennessy
- Dan August (1970–1971) - Spence
- Barnaby Jones (1973–1975) - Donald Harrelson / Ted Mason / Curt Fowler / Tony Bloom
- Doctors' Hospital (1976) - Dr. Malone
- The Rockford Files (1978) - Hillman Stewart / Agent Kleinhoff
- Dynasty (1987) - Harry Donalds
- Dark Justice (1993) - Mr. Collins
