= Pat Yankee =

American jazz and blues singer (1927–2022)

Pat Yankee (July 20, 1927 – May 30, 2022) was an American jazz and blues singer.

Yankee was born in Lodi, California and had a long career as a performing musician. She was also in the 1946 film It's Great to Be Young as Anita. She performed in an off-Broadway musical Basin Street in 1983 (in the New Federal Theatre).

Yankee died on May 30, 2022.

== Discography ==
- Pat Yankee Salutes Louis Armstrong (GHB, 1998)
- Pat Yankee Sings Saloon Songs (GHB, 2000)
- Salute to Saloon Tunes Vol. 2 (GHB, 2003)
- Together at Last (GHB, 2004)
- Remembering Sophie Tucker (GHB, 2005)

With Turk Murphy

- Music for Wise Guys & Boosters, Card Sharps & Crap Shooters (Roulette, 1959)
- At the Roundtable (Roulette, 1959)
- Let the Good Times Roll (RCA Victor, 1962)

== Filmography ==
- Anita in It's Great to Be Young 1946
