= Kid Nightingale =

1939 film

- Theatrical release poster
- Directed by: George Amy
- Screenplay by: Charles Belden; Raymond L. Schrock
- Story by: Lee Katz
- Produced by: Bryan Foy
- Starring: John Payne; Jane Wyman; Walter Catlett; Edward Brophy; Charles D. Brown; Max Hoffman Jr. John Ridgely
- Cinematography: Arthur Edeson
- Edited by: Frederick Richards
- Music by: Howard Jackson
- Production company: Warner Bros. Pictures
- Distributed by: Warner Bros. Pictures
- Release date: November 4, 1939
- Running time: 57 minutes
- Country: United States
- Language: English

Kid Nightingale is a 1939 American musical comedy film directed by George Amy and written by Charles Belden and Raymond L. Schrock. The film stars John Payne, Jane Wyman, Walter Catlett, Edward Brophy, Charles D. Brown, Max Hoffman Jr., and John Ridgely. The film was released by Warner Bros. Pictures on November 4, 1939.

== Plot ==
Singing waiter Steve Nelson flattens a customer who heckles him. Skip Davis, a trainer of prizefighters, witnesses this and proposes a new career to Steve, who agrees on the condition voice coach Rudolfo Terrassi is hired to help train him as a singer as well.

Women flock to ringside to watch the handsome Steve, dubbed "Kid Nightingale" for his singing talents. Steve is unaware that Skip and promoter Charles Paxton have fixed a number of fights, planning to bet on Steve to lose when he is pitted against a genuine opponent.

Judy Craig, the fighter's fiancée, recognizes Terrassi to be an impostor, actually wrestler Strangler Colombo in disguise. She brings the real Terrassi to the ring, where Steve, realizing he has been hoodwinked, promptly knocks out his foe, ruining his trainer's scheme and quitting boxing for good.

== Cast ==
- John Payne as Steve Nelson
- Jane Wyman as Judy Craig
- Walter Catlett as Skip Davis
- Edward Brophy as Mike Jordon
- Charles D. Brown as Charles Paxton
- Max Hoffman Jr. as Fitts
- John Ridgely as Whitey
- Harry Burns as Strangler Colombo / Rudolfo Terrassi
- William Haade as Rocky Snyder
- Helen Troy as Marge
- Winifred Harris as Mrs. Reynolds
- Lee Phelps as Ring Announcer
- Frankie Van as Frankie

== See also ==
- List of boxing films
