= The Royal Rodeo =

1939 film by George Amy

- Directed by: George Amy
- Written by: Owen Crump; Nate Gatzert
- Starring: John Payne; Lucile Fairbanks; Cliff Edwards
- Cinematography: Charles P. Boyle
- Edited by: Everett Dodd
- Music by: M. K. Jerome
- Production company: Warner Bros. Pictures
- Distributed by: Warner Bros. Pictures
- Release date: November 25, 1939
- Running time: 15 minutes

The Royal Rodeo is a 1939 short American musical film starring John Payne. It was made by Warner Brothers.

== Plot ==
A young monarch, bored with responsibility and craving excitement, invites a traveling rodeo show to perform at his palace.

== Cast ==
- John Payne as Bill Stevens
- Lucile Fairbanks as Marianne (as Lucille Fairbanks)
- Cliff Edwards as Shorty
- Scotty Beckett as the King
- Boyd Irwin as Regent
