= Raiders of the Seven Seas =

1953 film by Sidney Salkow

- Directed by: Sidney Salkow
- Written by: John O'Dea; Sidney Salkow
- Produced by: Edward Small
- Starring: John Payne; Donna Reed; Gerald Mohr; Lon Chaney Jr.
- Cinematography: W. Howard Greene
- Edited by: Buddy Small
- Music by: Paul Sawtell
- Production company: Global Productions
- Distributed by: United Artists
- Release date: May 27, 1953
- Running time: 88 minutes
- Country: United States
- Language: English

Raiders of the Seven Seas is a 1953 American swashbuckler adventure film directed by Sidney Salkow and starring John Payne and Donna Reed. The supporting cast features Gerald Mohr, Lon Chaney Jr. and Anthony Caruso.

== Plot ==
The pirate Barbarossa raids the Sultan of Morocco's ships and captures a betrothed woman.

== Cast ==
- John Payne as Barbarossa
- Donna Reed as Alida
- Gerald Mohr as Capt. Jose Salcedo
- Lon Chaney Jr. as Peg Leg
- Anthony Caruso as Renzo
- Henry Brandon as Capt. Goiti
- Skip Torgerson as Datu
- Frank De Kova as Capt. Romero
- William Tannen as Ramon
- Christopher Dark as Pablo
- Claire DuBrey as Señora Salcedo
- Howard Freeman as Mayor Pompano
- Robert Warwick as New Governor of Cuba

== Production ==
The film was originally known as Storm over the Caribbean, Barbarossa and Swords Against the Mast. It was an original story co written by director Sidney Salkow, who subsequently signed a long-term contract with producer Edward Small.

== See also ==
- Flame of Araby (1951), with Barbarossa and his brother as villains
- List of films featuring slavery
