= The Marge and Gower Champion Show =

American TV sitcom series (1957)

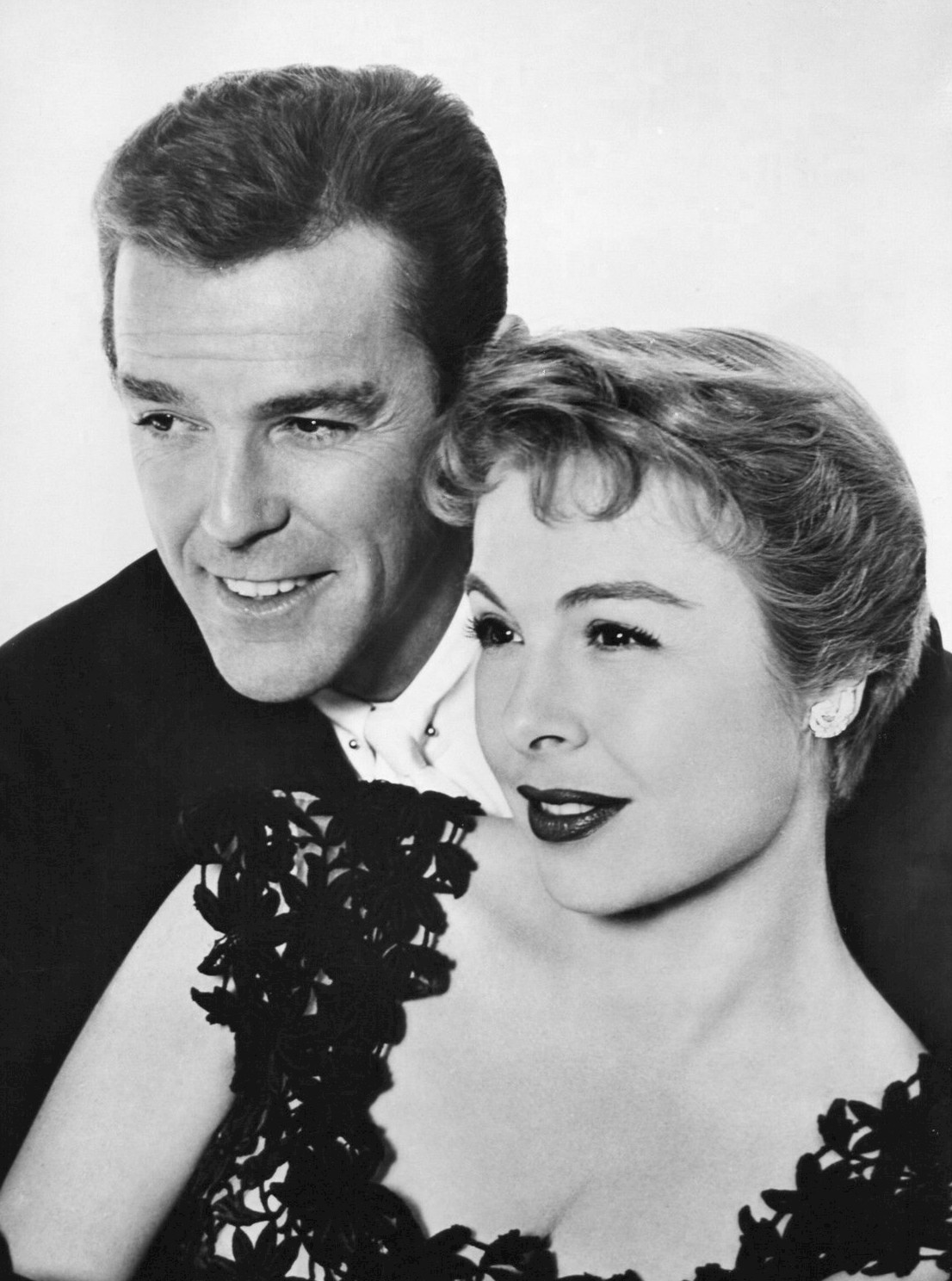
Gower and Marge Champion in 1957

The Marge and Gower Champion Show is an American television situation comedy that was broadcast on CBS from March 31, 1957, to June 9, 1957.

== Overview ==
Marge and Gower Champion portrayed themselves in this series, which incorporated music and dancing into the situation-comedy format. In the show (as in real life), they were married; he was a choreographer, and she was his dancing partner. Other regular characters were

- Marge's father (who was their agent), portrayed by Jack Whiting
- Cozy (a drummer), portrayed by Buddy Rich
- Amanda (a singer), portrayed by Peg LaCentra
- Miss Weatherly, portrayed by Barbara Perry.

Situations depicted were based on the Champions' real-life experiences, and episodes were written to include at least one dancing segment in each one. Gower Champion's participation in the premiere episode was curtailed because he had been in an automobile accident. The storyline was revised to accommodate the change, and he appeared in a wheelchair. Marge Champion and Whiting performed a soft-shoe dance number, and Jack Benny and Dan Dailey appeared as guest stars. By the second episode, he had recovered, and he "joined his wife in a delightful dance routine".

== Production ==
The Marge and Gower Champion Show was broadcast on Sundays from 8:30 to 9 p.m. Eastern Time, alternating weekly with The Jack Benny Program. It replaced Private Secretary in that time slot and was sponsored by the American Tobacco Company for Hit Parade cigarettes. The show was produced by J & M Productions. Paul Harrison produced and directed the series, which was broadcast live from Hollywood. Dick Pribor directed the music; Joe Connelly and Robert Mosher were the writers. Gower Champion was the choreographer.

== Critical response ==
George Tashman wrote in The (Richmond, California) Independent that the show's writing undermined the good aspects of the premiere episode. He noted that the Champions and Whiting succeeded in "breaking through a tough barrier placed there by the material they were given" and added, "The most badly needed improvement ... is in dialog and story line".

A review in The New York Times said that, despite the fragile nature of the second episode's story line, "As long as the talented and graceful Champions are given enough opportunities to glide around the studio, this series should be diverting entertainment."

The trade publication Variety, in a review of the May 12, 1957, episode, credited guest Mary McCarty, along with Connelly and Mosher, with being the episode's "heroes". McCarty, the review said, "began hot with a song on a broken-down guitar and never let up steam." It complimented the Champions' dancing but pointed out their lack of adeptness at reading their lines. As a result, the review said, the episode succeeded "largely because [Connelly and Mosher] know how to get around the obvious limitations of their stars and still make it an all-around attractive half-hour".
