= It's Great to Be Young (1946 film) =

1946 film by Del Lord

- Directed by: Del Lord
- Written by: Karen DeWolf; Jack Henley
- Produced by: Ted Richmond
- Starring: Leslie Brooks; Jimmy Lloyd; Jeff Donnell
- Cinematography: Henry Freulich
- Edited by: Aaron Stell
- Music by: George Duning
- Production company: Columbia Pictures
- Distributed by: Columbia Pictures
- Release date: September 12, 1946
- Running time: 69 minutes
- Country: United States
- Language: English

It's Great to Be Young is a 1946 American musical comedy film directed by Del Lord, starring Leslie Brooks, Jimmy Lloyd, Jeff Donnell, Bob Haymes, Jack Williams, Jack Fina, Frank Orth, Ann Codee, Pat Yankee, Frank Sully and Milton Delugg. It was released by Columbia Pictures.

== Plot ==
Ricky Malone has a new job at a resort and invites his talented friends, who are mistakenly under the impression that Ricky is entertainment director there. He actually has been hired by Mr. and Mrs. Johnson, the resort's owners, to do manual labor, and demands his friends help him work in the kitchen.

A singer who catches his eye and his ear, Terry, is mysterious about her past and won't tell Ricky why she seems to be running away from something. A detective, Burkett, tails her to the resort. The performers persuade Ambrose Kenton, nephew of Mrs. Johnson, to coax her into letting Milton Delugg's musicians entertain the customers and to let the rest of them demonstrate what they can do.

After they get him drunk, Burkett reveals that Terry's father hired him to bring her back and end her attempt to break into show business. Terry and the others are so talented, however, Mrs. Johnson hires them to remain on stage, and Broadway producers end up interested, too.

== Cast ==
- Leslie Brooks as Terry
- Jimmy Lloyd as Ricky
- Jeff Donnell as Georgia
- Bob Haymes as Spud
- Frank Orth as Mr. Johnson
- Ann Codee as Mrs. Johnson
- Frank Sully as Burkett
- Grady Sutton as Ambrose
- Milton Delugg as himself
- Pat Yankee as Anita
