= Cigarette Girl (1947 film) =

1947 film directed by Gunther von Fritsch

- Directed by: Gunther von Fritsch
- Screenplay by: Henry K. Moritz
- Story by: Edward Huebsch
- Produced by: William Bloom
- Starring: Leslie Brooks; Jimmy Lloyd; Ludwig Donath
- Cinematography: Vincent J. Farrar
- Edited by: Jerome Thoms
- Music by: Russ Morgan
- Production company: Columbia Pictures
- Distributed by: Columbia Pictures
- Release date: February 6, 1947
- Running time: 67 minutes
- Country: United States
- Language: English

Cigarette Girl is a 1947 American musical comedy film directed by Gunther von Fritsch to a story by Edward Huebsch and screenplay by Henry K. Moritz. The film stars Leslie Brooks, Jimmy Lloyd, Joan Barton, and Ludwig Donath. Music was provided by Russ Morgan and his orchestra. The film was described as "a revamping of the Cinderella theme". Shooting was scheduled to begin on September 9, 1946.

== Cast ==
- Leslie Brooks as Ellen Wilcox
- Jimmy Lloyd as Joe Atkins
- Ludwig Donath as Otto
- Doris Colleen as Peggy
- Howard Freeman as B. J. Halstead
- Joan Barton as Glenda Page
- Mary Forbes as Mrs. Halstead
- Francis Pierlot as Pervis
- Eugene Borden as Henri
- Arthur Loft as Harry Branum
- Russ Morgan as Orchestra Leader

== Reception ==
The film was first released on February 6, 1947, at Loew's as a second feature to Dead Reckoning which starred Humphrey Bogart. Reception of the film was lackluster, with Wanda Hale of the Daily News giving it two stars and describing it as "a sentimental, indifferent comedy".
