= Trudy Marshall =

American actress (1920–2004)

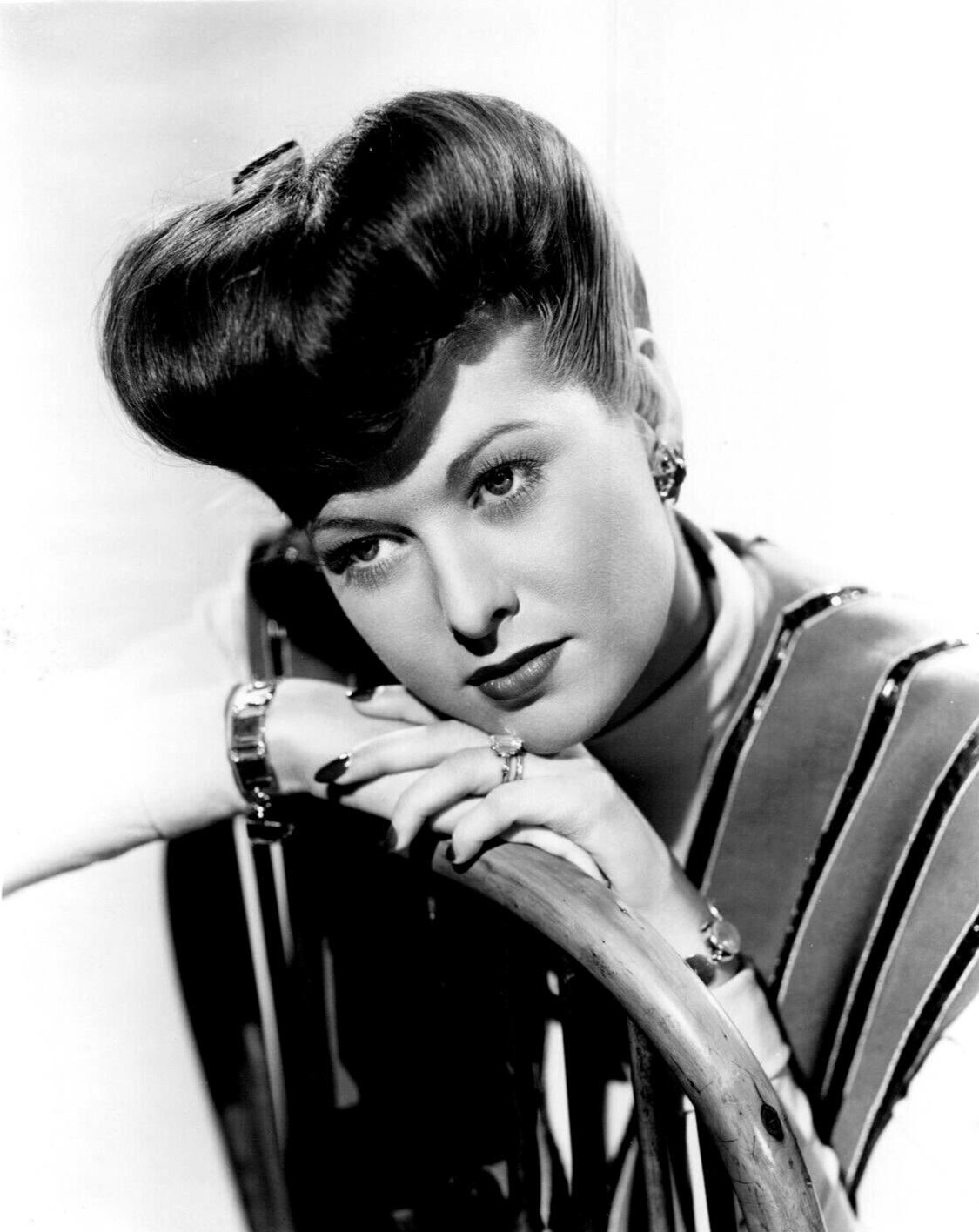
- Marshall in 1946
- Born: Gertrude Madeline Marshall; February 14, 1920; New York City, U.S.
- Died: May 23, 2004 (aged 84); Los Angeles, California, U.S.
- Resting place: Hillside Memorial Park Cemetery
- Occupations: Actress; model
- Years active: 1942–1979
- Spouses: Leland Lindsay (m. 1940; div. 1944) Philip Jordan Raffin (m. 1944; died 1981)
- Children: 3; including Deborah Raffin

Gertrude Madeline "Trudy" Marshall (February 14, 1920 – May 23, 2004) was an American actress and model.

== Early life ==
Marshall was born Gertrude Marshall in Brooklyn, New York, on February 14, 1920, the daughter of Madeline (née Brennan) and Frederick Marshall. She graduated from Floral Park Memorial High School.

== Career ==
A popular magazine cigarette girl during her modeling days for Harry Conover, Marshall was at different times "The Old Gold Girl", "The Chesterfield Girl", and "The Lucky Strike Girl".

Marshall was signed by 20th Century-Fox in 1942 and groomed in bit parts. In The Dancing Masters (1943) she was female lead to Laurel and Hardy. She next played a featured role in the World War II war drama The Fighting Sullivans (1944), the true story of a family that lost all five enlisted sons in the sinking of the USS Juneau off Guadalcanal in November 1942. Marshall played the surviving sister Genevieve.

Taking roles as a decorative ingenue for a time, Marshall later played the "other woman" in a few features. Semi-retired by the 1960s, she returned very infrequently to Hollywood. She appeared in the movie Once Is Not Enough (1975) with her daughter Deborah Raffin. Marshall was the hostess of her own radio and TV show in the 1980s in which she interviewed stars who attended special Hollywood events.

== Personal life ==
In 1944, Marshall married businessman Phillip Raffin, with whom she had three children, including model and actress Deborah Raffin. They remained together until his death in 1981.

== Death ==
On May 23, 2004, Marshall died at age 84 in her Century City, Los Angeles, home. She is interred in Hillside Memorial Park Cemetery.

== Partial filmography ==
- Secret Agent of Japan (1942) - Minor Role (uncredited)
- Footlight Serenade (1942) - Secretary (uncredited)
- Berlin Correspondent (1942) - Minor Role (uncredited)
- Orchestra Wives (1942) - Irene (uncredited)
- Girl Trouble (1942) - Miss Kennedy
- Thunder Birds (1942) - Red Cross Nurse Trainee (uncredited)
- Springtime in the Rockies (1942) - Marilyn Crothers (uncredited)
- Crash Dive (1943) - Telephone Operator (uncredited)
- Coney Island (1943) - Girl Friend (uncredited)
- Heaven Can Wait (1943) - Jane Van Cleve - Jack's Wife (uncredited)
- The Dancing Masters (1943) - Trudy Harlan
- The Fighting Sullivans (1944) - Genevieve 'Gen' Sullivan
- The Purple Heart (1944) - Mrs. Ross
- Ladies of Washington (1944) - Carol Northrup
- Roger Touhy, Gangster (1944) - Gloria
- Circumstantial Evidence (1945) - Agnes Hannon
- The Dolly Sisters (1945) - Lenora Baldwin
- Sentimental Journey (1946) - Ruth
- Talk About a Lady (1946) - Toni Marlowe
- Dragonwyck (1946) - Elizabeth Van Borden
- Boston Blackie and the Law (1946) - Irene
- Alias Mr. Twilight (1946) - Corky Corcoran
- Too Many Winners (1947) - Phyllis Hamilton
- Joe Palooka in the Knockout (1947) - Nina
- Key Witness (1947) - Marge Andrews
- Beyond Our Own (1947) - Ann Rogers
- The Fuller Brush Man (1948) - Sara Franzen
- Disaster (1948) - Jerry Hansford
- Shamrock Hill (1949) - Carol Judson
- Barbary Pirate (1949) - Anne Ridgeway
- Mark of the Gorilla (1950) - Barbara Bentley
- I'll See You in My Dreams (1951) - Frankie Mason (uncredited)
- The President's Lady (1953) - Jane Donelson (uncredited)
- Full of Life (1956) - Nora Gregory
- Married Too Young (1962) - Susan Newton
- Jacqueline Susann's Once Is Not Enough (1975) - Myrna
