= Key Witness (1947 film) =

1947 film by D. Ross Lederman

- Theatrical release poster
- Directed by: D. Ross Lederman
- Screenplay by: Edward Bock
- Story by: J. Donald Wilson
- Produced by: Rudolph C. Flothow
- Starring: John Beal; Trudy Marshall; Jimmy Lloyd
- Cinematography: Philip Tannura
- Edited by: Dwight Caldwell
- Production company: Columbia Pictures
- Distributed by: Columbia Pictures
- Release date: October 9, 1947 (United States)
- Running time: 67 minutes
- Country: United States
- Language: English

Key Witness is a 1947 American crime film noir directed by D. Ross Lederman and starring John Beal, Trudy Marshall and Jimmy Lloyd.

== Plot ==
A man suffering from amnesia awakens in a hospital room and slowly begins to recall events from his past. He remembers that he is Milton Higby, a devoted husband, draftsman and amateur inventor of novelty household gadgets. In his flashback, Milton has a humdrum job and a wife who relentlessly pressures him to advance his career. With his wife Martha out of town, Milton is persuaded by his friend Larry to experience some nightlife in the company of attractive girls. Milton finds himself drunk and nearly unconscious in the apartment of Sally Guthrie, and when Sally's former husband storms in and shoots her dead in a jealous rage, Milton is confused about what happened but knows that he will be suspected of the murder. He escapes through the window and tries to disappear, with the police hot on his trail.

Milton lives the life of a hobo and befriends a tramp named Smiley. When Milton and Smiley discover the dead body of a stranger, Milton hatches a plan to assume the dead man's identity, swapping his wallet for that of the dead man and taking the man's birth certificate. With his flashback complete, Milton is visited in his hospital room by lawyer Albert Loring, who believes that Milton is Arnold Ballin, the estranged son of his client, the wealthy John Ballin, who has not seen his son for many years. Milton realizes that it was Arnold Ballin's dead body that he had discovered. He is initially reluctant to pretend that he is Ballin but realizes that he has no choice but to accept his new identity.

John Ballin visits Milton at the hospital, believing him to be his son, and invites him to live with him in his luxurious home. Milton and Ballin grow close over the course of several months, but Milton begins to feel guilty that he is living on Ballin's wealth. To placate him, Ballin provides Milton with a basement workshop to develop his gadgets, and soon the Ballin Manufacturing Company is in business, producing thousands of Milton's cute light switches and talking clocks.

Larry and his new wife Trudy find a light switch in a store that is nearly identical to Milton's and confront Loring at the Ballin offices, believing that Milton must have revealed his idea to someone before he died and demanding that Martha receive a share of the profits. Not knowing that the man whom he believes to be Arnold Ballin is actually Milton, Loring denies that the idea was anyone's but Milton's. Larry persists in his quest, notifying the police that Arnold must have murdered Milton. The district attorney confronts Milton, accusing him of murder. But when Martha, Larry and Trudy appear and see Milton, he knows that the ruse must end and that he must face prosecution for Sally's murder. However, Sally's ex-husband has confessed to the crime, so Milton is exonerated. However, with the true identities of Milton and the dead man now known, Milton is tried and convicted of Albert Ballin's murder and sentenced to death row. At the last moment before Milton is to die, he is granted a reprieve when Smiley, who can vouch for Milton's innocence, surfaces.

== Cast ==
- John Beal as Milton Higby
- Trudy Marshall as Marge Andrews
- Jimmy Lloyd as Larry Summers
- Helen Mowery as Sally Guthrie
- Wilton Graff as Albert Loring
- Barbara Read as Martha Higby
- Charles Trowbridge as John Ballin
- Harry Hayden as Custer Bidwell

== Reception ==
In a contemporary review for The New York Times, critic Bosley Crowther called Key Witness a "limp and languid film" and wrote: "The moral of 'Key Witness' ... it says, is that 'no man can escape trouble by trying to run away from it.' This wisdom is demonstrated in the adventures of a desperate young man who attempts to get out of one involvement by changing his identity—and runs into others thereby ... There might also be drawn this moral from the evidence presented here: you can't often be sure of entertainment from that which is claimed to be."
