= Black Arrow (serial) =

1944 film by Lew Landers

- Theatrical release poster
- Directed by: Lew Landers; B. Reeves Eason (uncredited)
- Screenplay by: Sherman L. Lowe (as Sherman Lowe); Jack Stanley; Leighton Brill; Royal K. Cole
- Produced by: Rudolph C. Flothow
- Starring: Mark Roberts; Adele Jergens; Robert Williams; Kenneth MacDonald; Elmo Lincoln; Charles Middleton; Chief Thundercloud
- Cinematography: Richard Fryer
- Edited by: Dwight Caldwell; Earl Turner
- Music by: Lee Zahler
- Production company: Columbia Pictures
- Distributed by: Columbia Pictures
- Release date: October 20, 1944
- Running time: 270 minutes (15 episodes)
- Country: United States
- Language: English

Black Arrow is a 1944 American Western Serial film directed by Lew Landers and starring Robert Scott, Adele Jergens, Robert Williams and Kenneth MacDonald.

== Plot ==
Buck Sherman and Jake Jackson, a couple of evil carpetbaggers, illegally enter a Navajo reservation to prospect for gold and end up killing Aranho, the Navajos' chief. Black Arrow, presumed to be Aranho's son, refuses to kill the Indian agent, Tom Whitney, in revenge, as demanded by Navajo law. Black Arrow is driven off the reservation for his reluctance to kill Whitney and decides to join forces with Pancho, Mary Brent and Whitney to track down the men who killed the chief (Sherman and Jackson).

== Cast ==
- Mark Roberts as Black Arrow (as Robert Scott)
- Adele Jergens as Mary Brent
- Robert B. Williams as Buck Sherman (as Robert Williams)
- Kenneth MacDonald as Jake Jackson
- Charles Middleton as Tom Whitney
- Elmo Lincoln as Chief Aranho
- Martin Garralaga as Pancho
- Chief Thundercloud as the medicine man
- George J. Lewis as the "Snake-Who-Walks"
- I. Stanford Jolley as Tobis Becker
- Stanley Price as Wade
- Ferris Taylor as the Sheriff
- Dale Van Sickel as a henchman
- Dan White as Paul Brent
- Forrest Taylor as Prescott
- Nick Thompson as Atalan
- Eddie Parker as Hank
- Bud Osborne as Fred

== Chapter titles ==
1. The City of Gold
2. Signal of Fear
3. The Seal of Doom
4. Terror of the Badlands
5. The Secret of the Vault
6. Appointment with Death
7. The Chamber of Horror
8. The Vanishing Dagger
9. Escape from Death
10. The Gold Cache
11. The Curse of the Killer
12. Test by Torture
13. The Sign of Evil
14. An Indian's Revenge
15. Black Arrow Triumphs

== See also ==
- List of American films of 1944
