= Barbary Pirate (film) =

1949 film by Lew Landers

- Film poster
- Directed by: Lew Landers
- Written by: Robert Libott; Frank Burt
- Produced by: Sam Katzman
- Starring: Trudy Marshall; Donald Woods
- Cinematography: Ira H. Morgan
- Edited by: James Sweeney
- Production company: Sam Katzman Productions
- Distributed by: Columbia Pictures
- Release date: November 10, 1949
- Running time: 65 minutes
- Country: United States
- Language: English

Barbary Pirate is a 1949 American adventure film directed by Lew Landers and starring Donald Woods and Trudy Marshall.

== Plot ==
Major Tom Blake of the United States Army is assigned by the first United States Secretary of State - Thomas Jefferson to go undercover and discover who has been attacking American merchant ships after the American Revolutionary War has come to an end. Blake, calling himself "Brighton," boards a vessel and alienates two patriotic passengers, Anne Ridgeway and her brother Sam, who believe he possesses disloyal pro-British sentiments.

Men who serve Yusof, the Bey of Tripoli, of the Barbary states in North Africa are behind the raids at sea. Blake ingratiates himself by saving the Bey from an assassin's attack, then locates the knife thrower, Zoltah, and confides his true identity to her. To his surprise, Anne is taken captive by the Bey and offered to him as a personal servant, a reward for his heroism. Blake privately reassures Anne he will not take advantage of the situation.

Jefferson is later elected third President of the United States in 1800 and sends a second agent, Tobias Sharpe, to the scene, unaware that Sharpe is a traitor. Blake is captured and sentenced to death, but escapes in time to take part in a battle that eliminates the threat to America, winning the admiration and affection of Anne.

== Cast ==
- Donald Woods as Major Blake
- Trudy Marshall as Anne Ridgeway
- Lenore Aubert as Zoltah
- Ross Ford as Sam
- Stefan Schnabel as Yusof, the Bey
- John Dehner as Murad Reis
- Matthew Boulton as Sharpe

== Production ==
Writers Jack Pollexen and Aubrey Wisenberg later sued Katzman for $100,000 on the grounds of plagiarism, saying the film was based on a script they had submitted to him in 1948 called Pirate and the Slave Girl.
