= Exposed (1947 film) =

1947 film by George Blair

- Theatrical release poster
- Directed by: George Blair
- Screenplay by: Royal K. Cole; Charles Moran
- Story by: Charles Moran
- Produced by: William J. O'Sullivan
- Starring: Adele Mara; Mark Roberts; Lorna Gray; Robert Armstrong; William Haade; Bob Steele
- Cinematography: William Bradford
- Edited by: Irving M. Schoenberg
- Music by: Ernest Gold
- Production company: Republic Pictures
- Distributed by: Republic Pictures
- Release date: September 8, 1947
- Running time: 59 minutes
- Country: United States
- Language: English

Exposed is a 1947 American crime film directed by George Blair and written by Royal K. Cole and Charles Moran. The film stars Adele Mara, Mark Roberts, Lorna Gray, Robert Armstrong, William Haade and Bob Steele. The film was released on September 8, 1947, by Republic Pictures.

== Plot ==
A beautiful female private detective is hired by a wealthy businessman to check up on his stepson—the heir to the family fortune—who has been withdrawing large amounts of money from his bank account, taken an apartment in the city and is generally acting suspiciously. She soon finds herself mixed up in secret experiments, shadowy underworld figures and, finally, the murder of her employer.

== Cast ==
- Adele Mara as Belinda Prentice
- Mark Roberts as William Foresman III
- Lorna Gray as Judith Foresman
- Robert Armstrong as Inspector Prentice
- William Haade as Iggy Broty
- Bob Steele as Chicago
- Harry Shannon as Severance
- Charles Evans as Jonathan Lowell
- Joyce Compton as Emmy
- Russell Hicks as Colonel Bentry
- Paul E. Burns as Profosser Ordson
- Colin Campbell as Dr. Richard
- Edward Gargan as Mac "Big Mac"
- Mary Gordon as Miss Keets
- Patricia Knox as Waitress
