= The Road to Denver =

1955 film by Joseph Kane

- Theatrical release poster
- Directed by: Joseph Kane
- Screenplay by: Horace McCoy; Allen Rivkin
- Produced by: Joseph Kane
- Starring: John Payne; Mona Freeman
- Cinematography: Reggie Lanning
- Edited by: Richard L. Van Enger
- Music by: R. Dale Butts
- Color process: Trucolor
- Production company: Republic Pictures
- Distributed by: Republic Pictures
- Release date: June 15, 1955
- Running time: 90 minutes
- Country: United States
- Language: English

The Road to Denver is a 1955 American Western film directed by Joseph Kane starring John Payne, Mona Freeman, Lee J. Cobb, Ray Middleton and Skip Homeier. The supporting cast features Lee Van Cleef, Andy Clyde, Glenn Strange and Emory Parnell.

== Plot ==
Bill Mayhew is constantly getting his wild younger brother Sam out of trouble, even serving a prison sentence in Sam's place once. Because of their reputation, the brothers change names and head their separate ways.

Bill lands a job with John Sutton, a livery stable owner, and is attracted to Sutton's daughter, Elizabeth. He likes Sutton's idea of starting a stagecoach line to Denver, and intends to go along on the stage's first journey, guarding a shipment of gold.

Sam turns up and is hired by saloonkeeper Jim Donovan, who wants to control all businesses, Sutton's included. When he deduces they are brothers, Donovan pretends to hold Sam hostage until Bill brings him the gold. Bill double-crosses him and makes sure the gold is safe. Sam, feeling his brother a fool, demands a showdown. Bill outdraws him, shoots the gun from his hand, then turns his back. Sam finally reforms, even becoming a stagecoach driver for Sutton.

== Cast ==
- John Payne as Bill Mayhew
- Mona Freeman as Elizabeth Sutton
- Lee J. Cobb as Jim Donovan
- Ray Middleton as John Sutton
- Skip Homeier as Sam Mayhew
- Andy Clyde as Whipsaw Ellis
- Lee Van Cleef as Pecos Larry
- Karl Davis as Hunsaker
- Glenn Strange as Big George
- Robert 'Buzz' Henry as Buzz
- Dan White as Man in Buckboard
- Robert Burton as Pete
- Anna Lee Carroll as Miss Honeywell
- Tex Terry as Henchman
- Emory Parnell as Mr. Murdock
