= Sentimental Journey (film) =

1946 film by Walter Lang

- Theatrical release poster
- Directed by: Walter Lang
- Screenplay by: Samuel Hoffenstein; Elizabeth Reinhardt
- Based on: "The Little Horse"; 1944 Good Housekeeping story by Nelia Gardner White
- Produced by: Walter Morosco
- Starring: John Payne; Maureen O'Hara; William Bendix; Cedric Hardwicke
- Cinematography: Norbert Brodine
- Edited by: J. Watson Webb Jr.
- Music by: Cyril J. Mockridge
- Color process: Black and white
- Production company: 20th Century Fox
- Distributed by: 20th Century Fox
- Release date: March 1946
- Running time: 94 minutes
- Country: United States
- Language: English
- Box office: $3 million

Sentimental Journey is a 1946 American drama film directed by Walter Lang and starring John Payne, Maureen O'Hara and William Bendix. It was produced and distributed by 20th Century Fox. The film was remade in 1958 as The Gift of Love with Lauren Bacall and Robert Stack.

== Plot ==
A Broadway producer Bill and his actress-wife Julie are unable to have children. While strolling along the seashore, Julie finds an imaginative orphaned girl nicknamed Hitty and decides to adopt her, a plan that Bill agrees to while distracted by the actors on his latest play script. Shortly afterward, Julie dies of a heart attack, leaving Hitty in the care of the sullen Bill, who can't seem to connect with the girl. Guided and comforted by a ghostly vision of Julie, Hitty looks after Bill while he struggles to cope with Julie's death. At a Sunday afternoon party at the country house, Bill tells his friends to leave when Hitty describes her latest visitation from Julie. After Hitty runs away, Bill returns to the apartment and finds a recording of Julie's voice in which she describes Hitty as the "living link" that will always bind them. Bill goes to search for Hitty, finding her at the seashore where she first met Julie and rescuing her as the tide comes crashing in. Back at the apartment, Bill tucks Hitty into bed and informs his business manager that he must return to work now that he has a daughter to support.

== Cast ==
- John Payne as William O. Weatherly
- Maureen O'Hara as Julie Beck Weatherly
- William Bendix as Uncle "Don" Donnelly
- Cedric Hardwicke as Dr. Jim Miller
- Glenn Langan as Judson
- Connie Marshall as Mehitabel "Hitty" Weatherly
- Mischa Auer as Gregory Petrovich Rogozhin
- Kurt Kreuger as Walt Wilson
- Trudy Marshall as Ruth
- Ruth Nelson as Mrs. McMasters

== Reception ==
Bosley Crowther of The New York Times panned the film, calling it an "utterly mawkish picture ... a compound of hackneyed situations, maudlin dialogue and preposterously bad acting and is illogic all the way through." John McCarten of The New Yorker described the plot as "dismal" and reported that "not the merest trickle of a tear ran down my cheeks" despite the film being "plainly designed to break my heart." Variety declared it "the weeper to end all weepers," and despite considering the film to be "plodding and sometimes too premeditated," predicted it would be a box office hit. Harrison's Reports called it "a fairly good drama," though "thin and slow-moving."

Despite the less-than-glowing reviews from critics, the film was a box office success.
