= The Dancing Masters =

1943 film by Malcolm St. Clair

- Theatrical release poster
- Directed by: Malcolm St. Clair
- Written by: George Bricker (story); Scott Darling (screenplay)
- Produced by: Lee S. Marcus
- Starring: Stan Laurel; Oliver Hardy; Trudy Marshall; Robert Bailey; Matt Briggs; Margaret Dumont; Allan Lane; Hank Mann; Robert Mitchum
- Cinematography: Norbert Brodine
- Edited by: Norman Colbert
- Music by: Arthur Lange
- Distributed by: 20th Century Fox
- Release date: November 19, 1943
- Running time: 63 minutes
- Country: United States
- Language: English

The Dancing Masters is a 1943 black and white American comedy film directed by Malcolm St. Clair, produced by 20th Century-Fox, and featuring Laurel and Hardy. A young Robert Mitchum has a small, uncredited role as a gangster posing as an insurance salesman.

== Plot ==
Dancing instructors Laurel and Hardy inadvertently entangle themselves in a fraudulent insurance scheme devised by two impostor gangsters posing as insurance agents. Concurrently, the narrative unfolds around Grant Lawrence, a young inventor working on a revolutionary invisible ray device designed for jungle warfare during World War II. Trudy Harlan, Grant's romantic interest and one of Stan's dance pupils, extends an invitation to Grant and the duo to her residence for tea in her parents' absence.

The precarious situation escalates when Trudy's father, Wentworth Harlan, nearly discovers Laurel and Hardy in his home upon his return. However, the duo narrowly evades detection. The following day, the pair faces impending eviction from their dancing school due to unpaid rent, prompting them to devise a plan to secure funds. Complications ensue as Laurel suggests utilizing Hardy's savings to settle the debt, leading to a series of misadventures culminating in the accidental destruction of a prized antique clock.

Undeterred by setbacks, Laurel and Hardy assist Grant in promoting his invention by masquerading as the inventor and a foreign scientist, respectively. Despite an initial success, a mishap during a demonstration results in the device's destruction. However, the incident garners Grant the approval of Mr. Harlan, Trudy's father.

In a bid to secure finances, Hardy devises a scheme to orchestrate accidents involving Laurel, leveraging the fraudulent insurance document. However, their efforts backfire, leading to unintended consequences. Meanwhile, Mr. Harlan confronts his friend's attempt to pilfer Grant's invention, ultimately deciding to endorse Grant's endeavors and finance his future inventions.

As Ollie's desperation mounts, he engineers another mishap for Stan, leading to a calamitous bus journey to the beach. A dog nibbles an ice cream cone, leading to cries of "MAD DOG!". Everyone jumps off the lower half of the double decker bus, including the driver. Stan&Ollie are alone on the top deck and know nothing until the driverless bus mounts an amusement park roller coaster and takes Ollie on a harrowing ride. The sequence culminates in Ollie's hospitalization with a broken leg, prompting a heartfelt visit from Trudy, Grant, and Stan.

== Cast ==
- Stan Laurel as Stanley
- Oliver Hardy as Oliver
- Trudy Marshall as Trudy Harlan
- Robert Bailey as Grant Lawrence
- Matt Briggs as Wentworth Harlan
- Margaret Dumont as Louise Harlan
- Allan Lane as George Worthing
- Emory Parnell as Featherstone

== Reception ==
Prior to the release of The Dancing Masters, 20th Century Fox disclosed a directive to cease production of low-budget B pictures. As a consequence, The Dancing Masters, designated as the final B-picture on the schedule, underwent substantial editing, resulting in a notably abbreviated runtime of 63 minutes.

Despite its brevity, the film garnered significant acclaim upon its theatrical debut, emerging as Fox's third-highest-grossing production of the year. Its box office success secured a position as the twentieth highest-grossing film of 1943. The favorable reception prompted Fox to rescind its policy discontinuing B pictures, reinstating their production endeavors.
