= John Payne (actor) =

American actor (1912–1989)

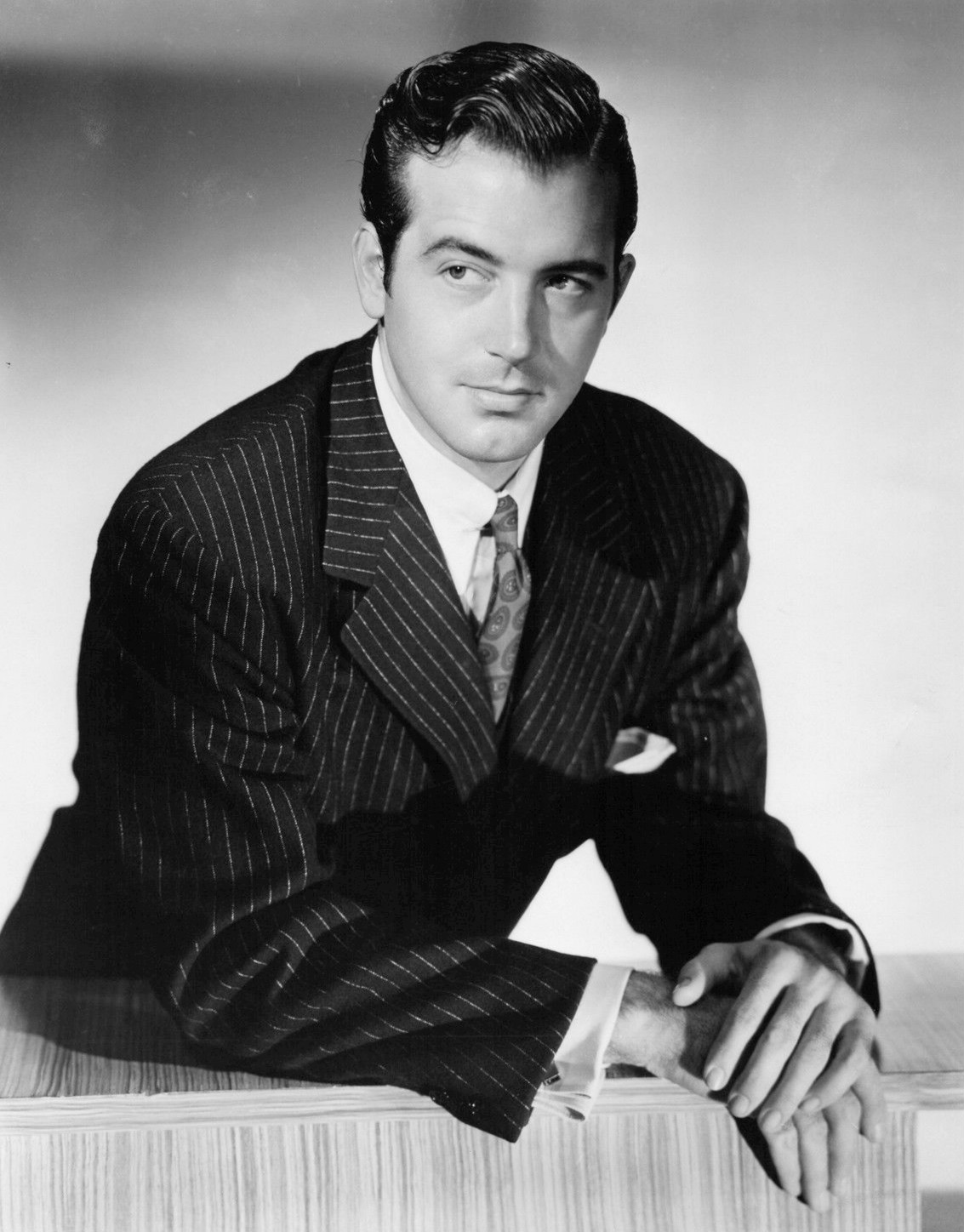
- Payne in 1949
- Born: John Howard Payne; May 23, 1912; Roanoke, Virginia, U.S.
- Died: December 6, 1989 (aged 77); Malibu, California, U.S.
- Education: Mercersburg Academy
- Alma mater: Roanoke College; Columbia University; Juilliard School
- Occupations: Actor; singer
- Years active: 1934–1975
- Known for: Miracle on 34th Street; The Restless Gun; Tin Pan Alley; The Dolly Sisters
- Spouses: Anne Shirley (m. 1937; div. 1943) Gloria DeHaven (m. 1944; div. 1950) Alexandra Crowell Curtis (m. 1953)
- Children: 3, including Julie Payne

John Howard Payne (May 23, 1912 – December 6, 1989) was an American film actor who is mainly remembered from film noir crime stories and 20th Century Fox musical films, and for his leading roles in Miracle on 34th Street and the NBC Western television series The Restless Gun.

== Early life ==
Payne was born in Roanoke, Virginia on May 23, 1912. His mother, Ida Hope (née Schaeffer), a singer, graduated from the Virginia Seminary in Roanoke and married George Washington Payne, a developer in Roanoke. They lived at Fort Lewis, an antebellum mansion that became a state historic property, but was destroyed by fire in the late 1940s.

Payne attended prep schools at Mercersburg Academy in Mercersburg, Pennsylvania and Episcopal High School in Alexandria, Virginia, and afterwards went to Roanoke College in Salem, Virginia. He then transferred to Columbia University in New York City in the fall of 1930. He studied drama at Columbia and voice at the Juilliard School. To support himself, he took on a variety of odd jobs, including wrestling as "Alexei Petroff, the Savage of the Steppes" and boxing as "Tiger Jack Payne".

He returned frequently to visit his family in Roanoke, Virginia.

== Acting career ==
=== Stage actor ===
In 1934, a talent scout for the Shubert theaters spotted Payne and gave him a job as a stock player. He appeared in road company productions of Rose-Marie and The Student Prince at $40 a week.

Payne toured with several Shubert Brothers shows, and frequently sang on New York City-based radio programs. On Broadway he appeared in the revue At Home Abroad (1935–36) alongside Ethel Waters, Eleanor Powell and Beatrice Lillie. He understudied for Reginald Gardiner and took over one night. He was seen by Fred Kohlmar of Sam Goldwyn's company and was offered a movie contract.

=== Early films ===
In 1936, he left New York for Hollywood. His first role was in Goldwyn's Dodsworth, playing Harry McKee, the son-in-law of Walter Huston's titular character.

He had the male lead as Jimmy Maxwell in Hats Off (1936), an independent film.

Payne was third billed in Fair Warning (1937), at Fox, and was the lead in Love on Toast (1937). He had a small role in Paramount's College Swing (1938).

=== Warner Bros ===
Payne signed a contract with Warner Bros. and played Don Vincent in Garden of the Moon (1938). He was in Kid Nightingale (1939) and Wings of the Navy (1939). Payne supported Ann Sheridan in Indianapolis Speedway (1939).

During this time he returned to Broadway to appear in Abe Lincoln in Illinois (1938–39). Payne was unhappy with his Warner Bros. roles, and asked for a release.

=== 20th Century Fox ===
Payne went to 20th Century Fox where he appeared in Star Dust (1940). During filming, Darryl F. Zanuck offered him a long-term contract.

He had supporting roles in Maryland (1940) and The Great Profile (1940).

Payne had roles in the comedy The Great American Broadcast (1940), and was in the musicals Tin Pan Alley (1940), Week-End in Havana (1941) and Sun Valley Serenade (1941).

Fox gave him the chance to do drama in Remember the Day (1941) and To the Shores of Tripoli (1942).

After serving in the military during World War II Payne returned to Fox, and was in The Dolly Sisters (1945), playing Harry Fox. It was one of Payne's most successful films.

Payne starred with Maureen O'Hara in Sentimental Journey (1946), and was in The Razor's Edge (1946).

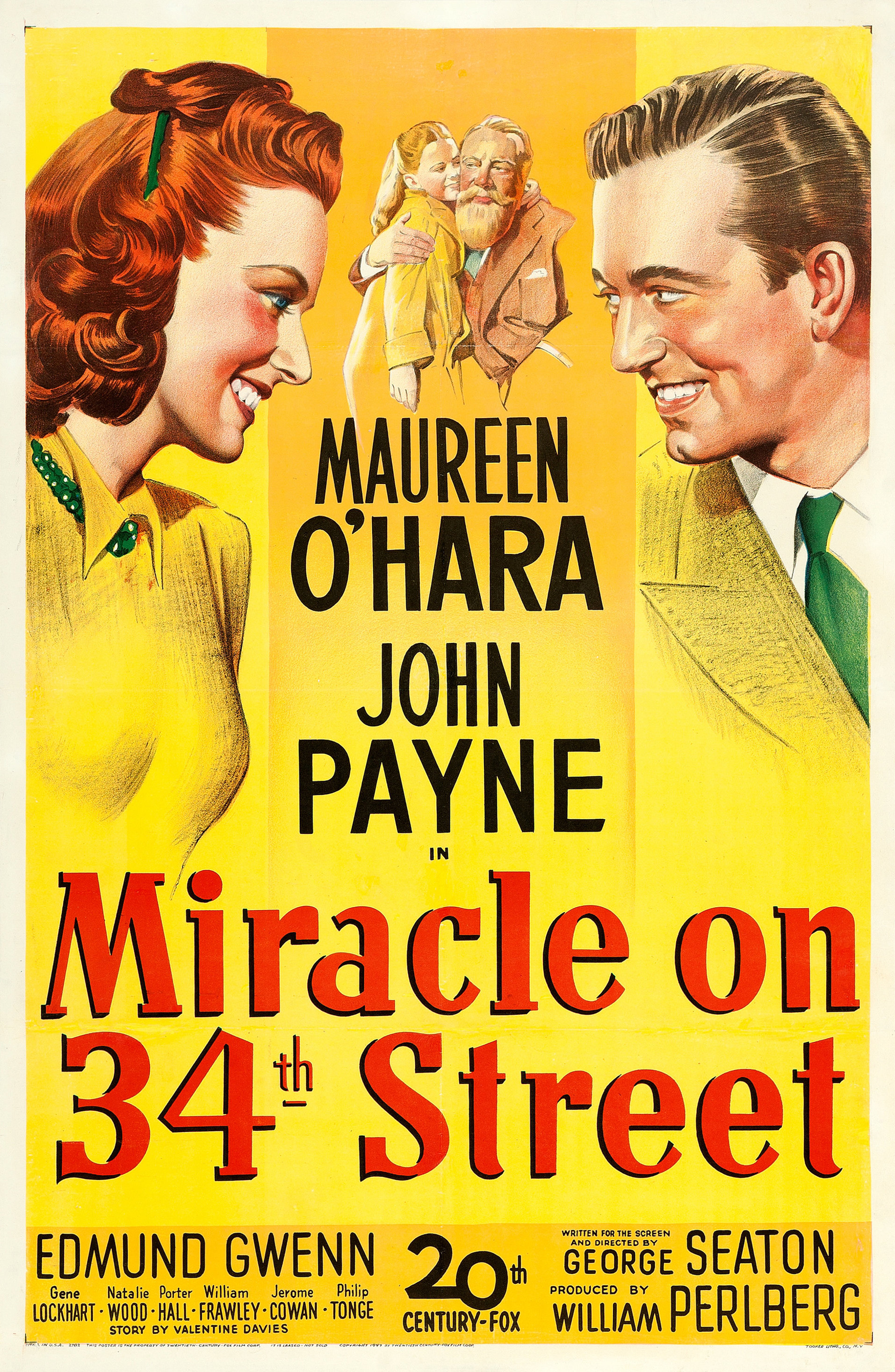

Payne's most familiar role may be his final film for Fox, that of attorney Fred Gailey in the classic holiday favorite Miracle on 34th Street (1947) with Natalie Wood, Maureen O'Hara and Edmund Gwenn. Payne admitted that prior to the film, he had been on suspension for refusing an assignment by the Fox studio, but he had asked directors around the lot and was told about Miracle on 34th Street. Miracle on 34th Street was another box office success. He was meant to make another film with O'Hara, Sitting Pretty (1948), however, in October 1947 he got his release from the studio, despite the contract having another four years to run, which would have brought him $670,000. Payne claimed he was dissatisfied with the roles being offered him.

Payne later said he had asked for his release every week for eight months before he got it. Film historian Jeanine Basinger later wrote that "Fox thought of [Payne] as a secondary Tyrone Power. They didn't know how to use him."

=== Freelance actor ===
After leaving Fox, Payne attempted to change his image and began playing tough-guy roles in Hollywood films noir.

He did two noirs at Universal, Larceny (1948), where he played the lead role, and was in The Saxon Charm (1948). He had the lead in The Crooked Way (1949) for United Artists.

=== Pine-Thomas Productions ===
Payne received an offer to star in a Western for Pine-Thomas Productions, a unit that operated out of Paramount Studios. His first film for the company was El Paso (1949). Other roles were in Captain China (1950), an adventure film; Tripoli (1950) set during the Barbary War; and The Eagle and the Hawk (1950), a Western.

He signed a contract to make three more films for Pine-Thomas and was in Passage West (1951), another Western; and Crosswinds (1951), an adventure film; Caribbean Gold (1952), a pirate film; The Blazing Forest (1952), an adventure story; The Vanquished (1952), a Western.

Payne insisted that the films he appeared in be filmed in color and that the rights to the films revert to him after several years, making him wealthy when he rented them to television.

In 1952 he said he got four times the fan mail he did at Fox. "I make fewer pictures now but I make the kind I want to make."

=== Other independent producers ===
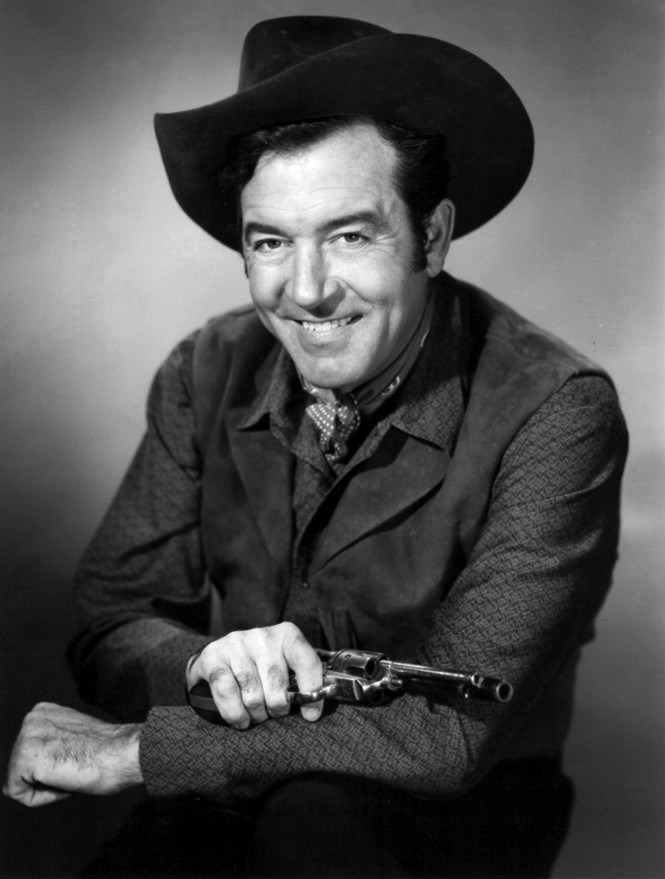
John Payne in the television series The Restless Gun (1957)

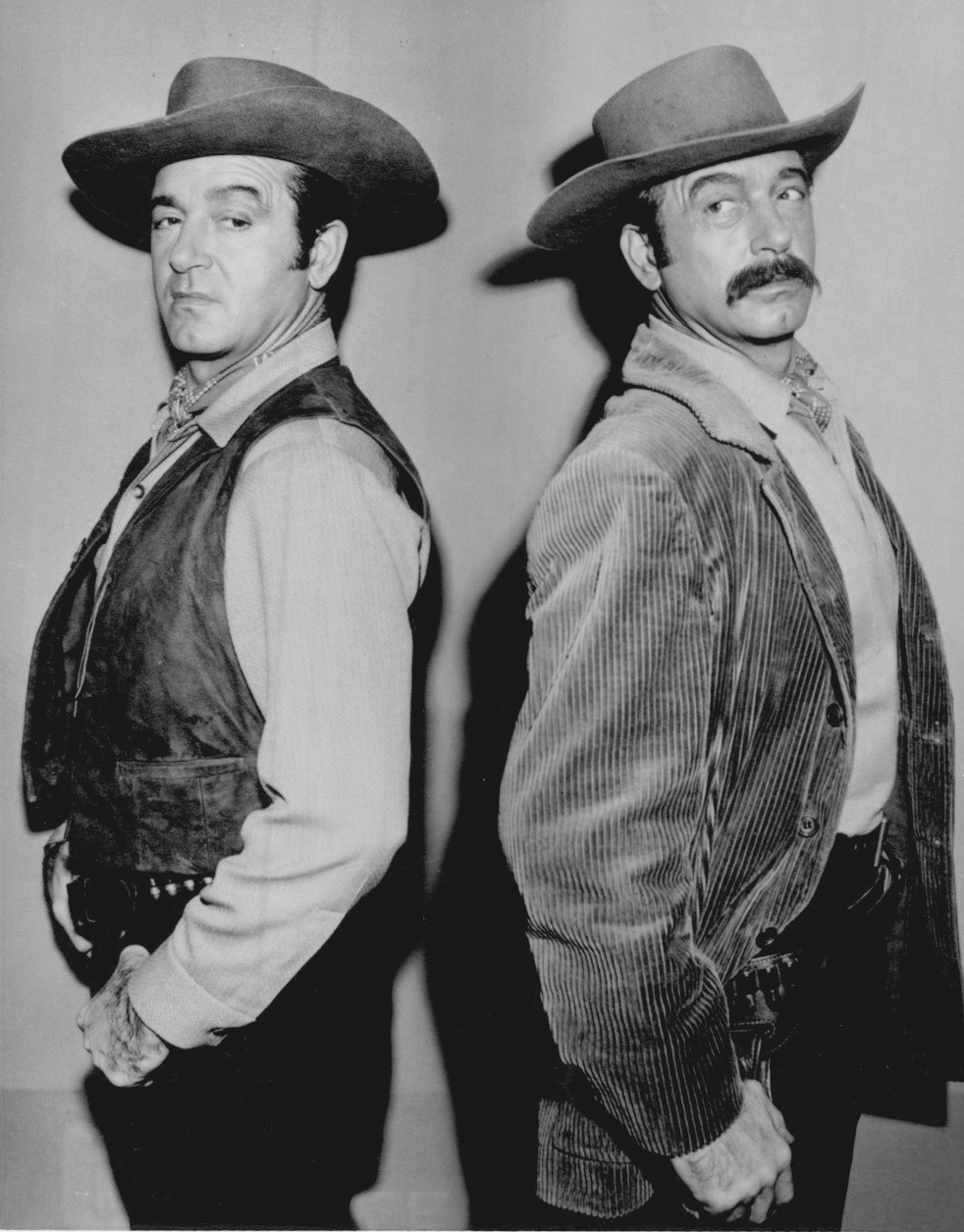
Payne in a dual role in The Restless Gun

Payne starred in Kansas City Confidential (1952), a noir directed by Phil Karlson, and owned 25% of the film. He later worked with on Raiders of the Seven Seas (1953), a pirate movie; and 99 River Street (1953), a noir also directed by Karlson.

Payne did a series of Westerns: Silver Lode (1954), for Benedict Bogeaus; Rails Into Laramie (1955), for Universal; Santa Fe Passage (1955) and The Road to Denver (1955) at Republic, and Tennessee's Partner (1955) for Bogeaus.

In 1955, he paid a $1,000-a-month option for nine months on the Ian Fleming James Bond novel Moonraker (he eventually gave up the option when he learned he could not retain the rights for the entire book series).

He returned to Pine-Thomas for a noir, Hell's Island (1956), then did Slightly Scarlet (1956) for Bogeaus. He made Hold Back the Night (1956) for Allied Artists and The Boss (1956) for United Artists, co-producing the latter. He did another noir, Hidden Fear, shot in Denmark.

Payne made one more Pine-Thomas film, Bailout at 43,000 (1957), playing Major Paul Peterson.

=== Television ===
Payne starred as Vint Bonner in The Restless Gun, a half-hour Western which aired on NBC Monday evenings from September 23, 1957, to September 14, 1959. He played a gunfighter who preferred not to fight if other options were available. The series was originally based on an earlier radio series starring James Stewart titled The Six Shooter. On October 31, 1957, Payne guest-starred on The Ford Show hosted by Tennessee Ernie Ford.

=== Later career ===
Payne directed one of his last films, They Ran for Their Lives (1968), and starred with Alice Faye in a 1974 revival of the musical Good News. He also starred in the Gunsmoke episode of "Gentry's Law" in 1970.

His final role was in 1975, when he co-starred with Peter Falk and Janet Leigh in the Columbo episode "Forgotten Lady". Later in life Payne became wealthy through real estate investments in southern California.

== Personal life ==
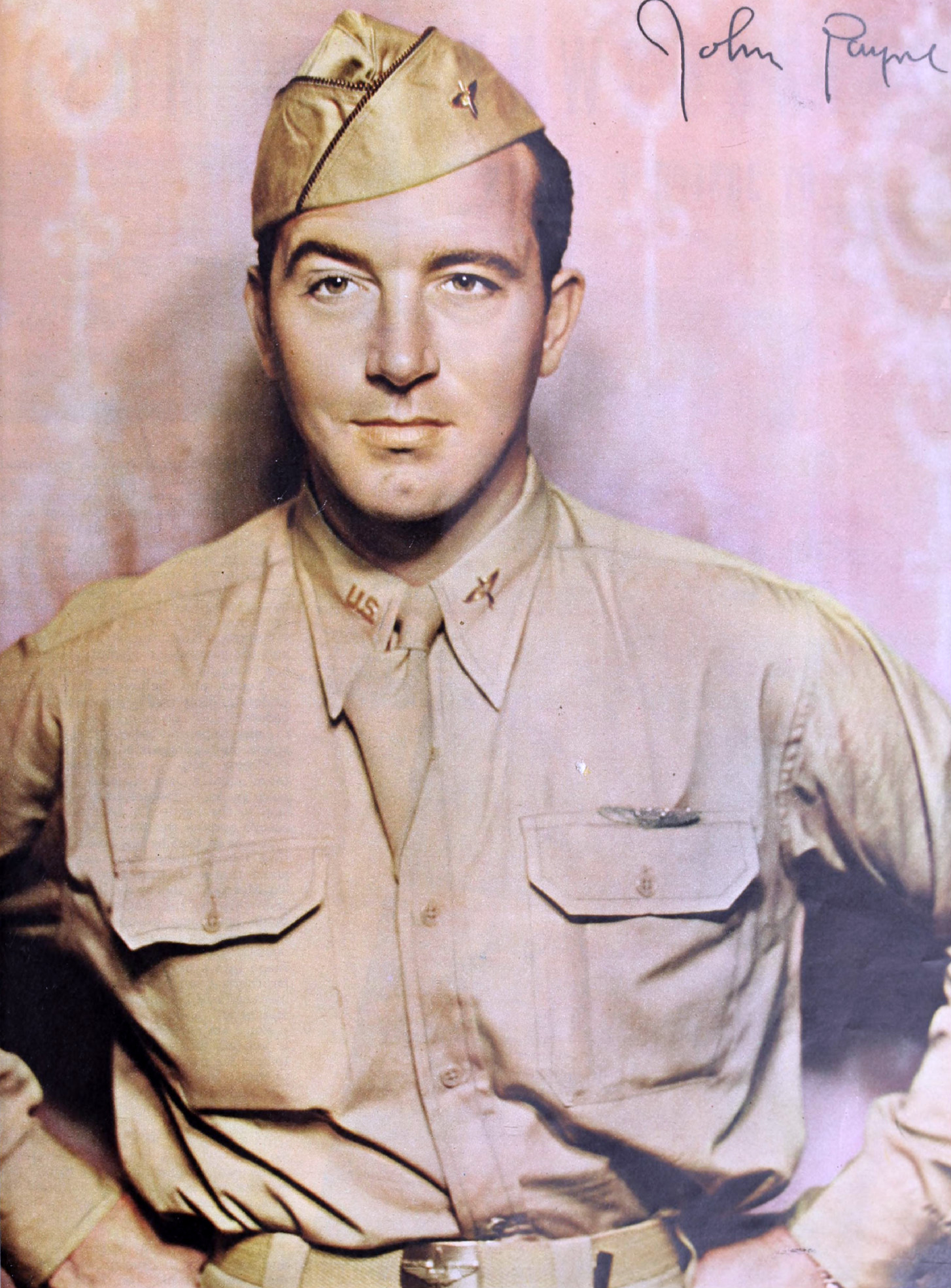
John Payne in uniform (1943)

During World War II Payne served as a flight instructor in the United States Army Air Corps.

Payne was married to actress Anne Shirley from 1937 to 1942; they had a daughter, Julie Anne Payne.

He married actress Gloria DeHaven in 1944; the couple had two children, Kathleen and Thomas, before divorcing in 1950. The couple remained on good terms, and on June 27, 1961, columnist Earl Wilson wrote that DeHaven was still concerned over Payne's March 1961 accident, and called him once a week.

During the filming of Kansas City Confidential (1952) Payne had a romance with co-star Coleen Gray that continued well past filming. They later appeared together in Tennessee's Partner, alongside future U.S. President Ronald Reagan.

Payne then married Alexandra Beryl "Sandy" Crowell Curtis in 1953, and remained with her until his death.

His oldest daughter, Julie, was married to writer-director Robert Towne from 1977 to 1982.

Payne was a Republican, and in October 1960 he was one of many conservative notables who drove in the Nixon-Lodge Bumper Sticker Motorcade in Los Angeles. Payne also supported Barry Goldwater in the 1964 United States presidential election.

=== Accident ===
On the evening of March 1, 1961, when Payne was 48, he suffered extensive, life-threatening injuries when struck by a car when he was crossing Madison Avenue in New York City. It had been raining, and the driver claimed he had not seen Payne. Payne was tossed into the air, and came down facefirst into the car's windshield, which then shattered, causing extensive facial lacerations, including damaging both his eyes. His left leg was broken in five places, and he suffered a skull fracture.

Payne was taken to Roosevelt Hospital (now named Mount Sinai West), where he had facial surgery. He was in a hip cast for five-and-a-half months. He claimed his full recovery was due to doctors telling him that a patient's attitude is important, and he always remained optimistic.

One of Payne's first public appearances during this period was as a guest panelist on the popular CBS Sunday night game show What's My Line? In the December 3, 1961, episode, regular panelist Dorothy Kilgallen introduced Payne by saying, "He's been in the hospital after a very bad accident. So it's good to see him fit as a fiddle and all in one piece." Regular panelist Bennett Cerf remarked, "Good to see you here, John. Glad to see you beat that car on Madison Avenue that bumped into you."

== Death ==
Payne died in Malibu, California, of congestive heart failure on December 6, 1989, aged 77. His ashes were scattered into the Pacific Ocean.

He has two stars on the Hollywood Walk of Fame, in motion pictures and television.

== Complete filmography ==
Year	Title	Role	Notes
1936	Dodsworth	Harry McKee	
1937	Hats Off	Jimmy Maxwell	
1937	Fair Warning	Jim Preston	
1937	Love on Toast	Bill Adams	
1938	College Swing	Martin Bates	
1938	Garden of the Moon	Don Vincente	
1939	Wings of the Navy	Jerry Harrington	
1939	Indianapolis Speedway	Eddie Greer	
1939	Kid Nightingale	Steve Nelson, a.k.a. Kid Nightingale	
1939	The Royal Rodeo	Bill Stevens	Short
1940	Star Dust	Ambrose Fillmore, a.k.a. Bud Borden	
1940	King of the Lumberjacks	James "Jim" / "Slim" Abbott	
1940	Tear Gas Squad	Sergeant Bill Morrissey	
1940	Maryland	Lee Danfield	
1940	The Great Profile	Richard Lansing	
1940	Tin Pan Alley	Francis Aloysius "Skeets" Harrigan	
1941	The Great American Broadcast	Rix Martin	
1941	Sun Valley Serenade	Ted Scott	
1941	Week-End in Havana	Jay Williams	
1941	Remember the Day	Dan Hopkins	
1942	To the Shores of Tripoli	Chris Winters	
1942	Footlight Serenade	William J. "Bill" Smith	
1942	Iceland	Capt. James Murfin	
1942	Springtime in the Rockies	Dan Christy	
1943	Hello, Frisco, Hello	Johnny Cornell	
1945	The Dolly Sisters	Harry Fox	
1946	Sentimental Journey	William O. Weatherly	
1946	The Razor's Edge	Gray Maturin	
1946	Wake Up and Dream	Jeff Cairn	
1947	Miracle on 34th Street	Fred Gailey	
1948	Larceny	Rick Mason	
1948	The Saxon Charm	Eric Busch	
1949	El Paso	Clay Fletcher	
1949	The Crooked Way	Eddie Rice, a.k.a. Eddie Riccardi	
1949	Captain China	Charles S. Chinnough / Capt. China	
1950	The Eagle and the Hawk	Capt. Todd Croyden	
1950	Tripoli	Lt. Presley O'Bannon	
1951	Passage West	Pete Black	
1951	Crosswinds	Steve Singleton	
1952	Caribbean	Dick Lindsay / Robert MacAllister	
1952	Kansas City Confidential	Joe Rolfe / Peter Harris	
1952	The Blazing Forest	Kelly Hansen	
1953	Raiders of the Seven Seas	Barbarossa	
1953	The Vanquished	Rockwell (Rock) Grayson	
1953	99 River Street	Ernie Driscoll	
1954	Rails Into Laramie	Jefferson Harder	
1954	Silver Lode	Dan Ballard	
1955	Hell's Island	Mike Cormack	
1955	Santa Fe Passage	Kirby Randolph	
1955	The Road to Denver	Bill Mayhew	
1955	Tennessee's Partner	Tennessee	w/ Ronald Reagan
1956	Slightly Scarlet	Ben Grace	
1956	Hold Back the Night	Capt. Sam McKenzie	
1956	Rebel in Town	John Willoughby	
1956	The Boss	Matt Brady	
1957	The Restless Gun	Vint Bonner	TV series
1957	Bailout at 43,000	Maj. Paul Peterson	
1957	Hidden Fear	Mike Brent	
1960	O'Conner's Ocean	Tom O'Conner	TV movie
1968	They Ran for Their Lives	Bob Martin	
1975	Columbo	Ned Diamond	Episode: "Forgotten Lady"

== Radio appearances ==
Year	Program	Episode/source
1940	Lux Radio Theatre	Wings of the Navy
1947	Lux Radio Theatre	Miracle on 34th Street
1952	Family Theater	The Promise
