= Peg LaCentra =

American actress

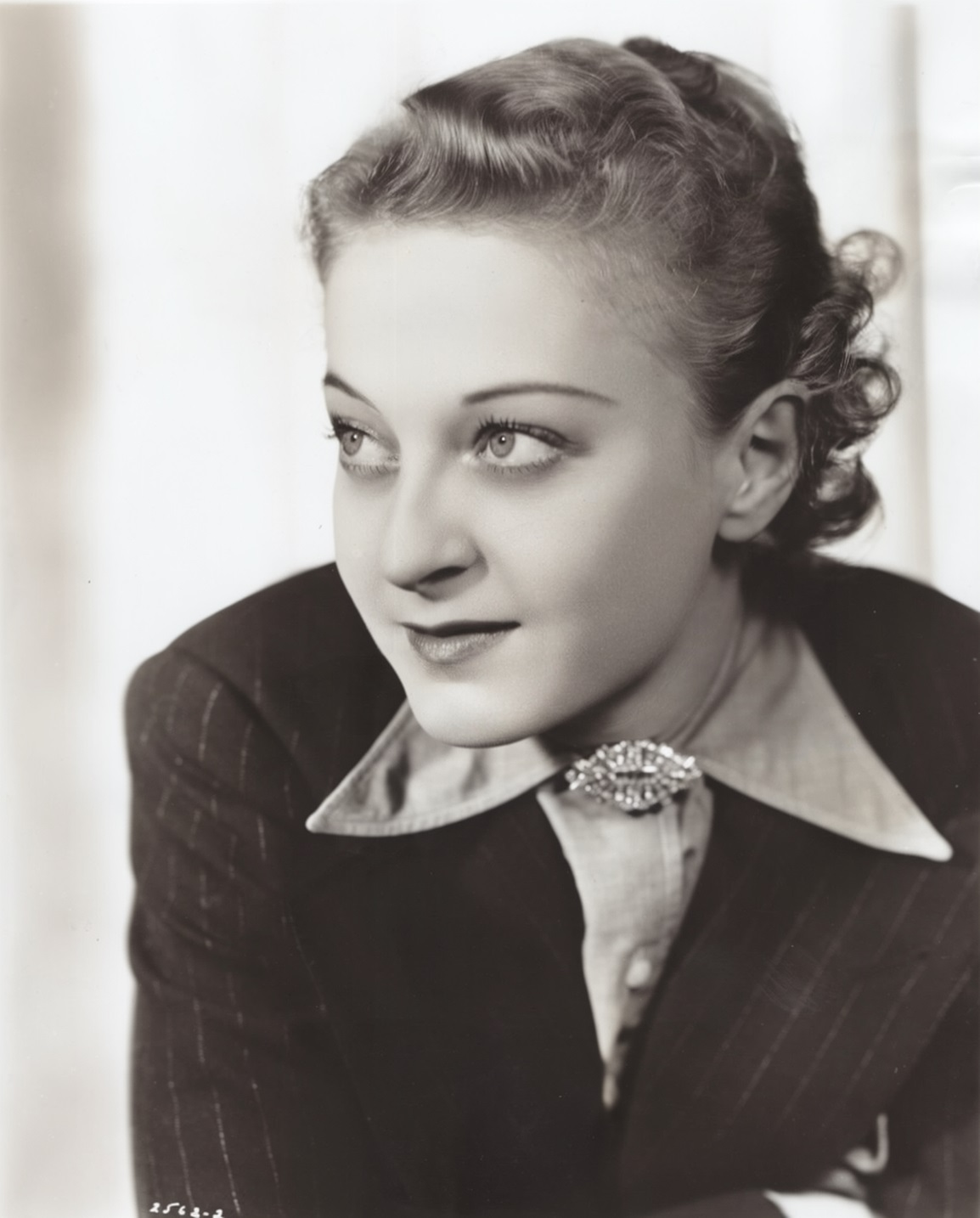
- LaCentra in 1940
- Born: Margherita Maria Francesca LaCentra; April 10, 1910; Boston, Massachusetts, U.S.
- Died: June 1, 1996 (aged 86); Los Angeles, California, U.S.
- Other name: Barbara Fulton
- Occupations: Singer, actress
- Spouse: Paul Stewart (m. 1939; died 1986)
- Children: 1

Margherita Maria Francesca LaCentra (April 10, 1910 – June 1, 1996) was an American contralto singer, best known for her work on old-time radio and her singing with Artie Shaw's orchestra. She also performed as Barbara Fulton.

== Early years ==
Born on April 10, 1910 in Boston, LaCentra studied at the Fenway Academy of Dramatic Art and the New England Conservatory of Music and graduated from Katharine Gibbs College.

== Radio ==
LaCentra worked as an announcer at WNAC and performed on WBZ radio in Boston before moving to New York in 1931 to work on network radio broadcasts. She performed on NBC programs, including Beauty Box Theater, Circus Night in Silvertown, and Lucky Smith.

In 1934, LaCentra was billed as Barbara Fulton when she sang with Leo Reisman's orchestra on radio. Use of the pseudonym was necessary because Reisman's sponsor was a competitor of the one for which she sang on another program. In December 1934, she began singing with Harry Reser and his orchestra on a new weekly program on NBC.

In 1935, a group of five radio stars selected LaCentra and Bob Lawrence to star in a new program, The Radio City Party, on NBC-Blue. Also in 1935, she was the leading lady on Max Baer's radio program. She gained her own program, The Peg LaCentra Show, on NBC in 1938, a year in which she also sang on For Men Only on NBC.

LaCentra was one of the stars of the Gulden's Mustard Serenade, a 15-minute variety show broadcast on NBC twice weekly in 1940. She and singer Jerry Wayne co-starred in a twice-weekly musical program on CBS in 1944. As a dramatic actress, she frequently played supporting roles in Mutual's romantic thriller, The Modern Adventures of Casanova (1952).

In addition to her work on network radio, LaCentra recorded programs for NBC's Thesaurus music service.

== Stage and television ==
LaCentra appeared on Broadway as Mrs. Hamilton in The Patriots (1943). In 1957, she appeared in a production of the romantic comedy Janus at the Pasadena Playhouse.

On television, she played Amanda on the CBS comedy series The Marge and Gower Champion Show (1957).

== Orchestras and recordings ==
In 1932, LaCentra sang with Phil Spitalny and his orchestra. Her first recording was "The Fortune Teller" (1934) with Johnny Green's orchestra on the Columbia label.

In 1936, LaCentra joined Shaw as a singer for his newly formed orchestra. The two had worked together when she sang on The Mell-O-Roll Ice Cream Show, on which he was a member of the orchestra. In their new relationship, they performed in New York at the Paramount Theater and the Lexington Hotel. She recorded with Shaw for Brunswick records for a year. She also sang with Benny Goodman's orchestra and recorded with Jerry Sears' orchestra for Bluebird Records.

== Film ==
LaCentra was a ghost singer in feature films, dubbing vocal performances for stars including Susan Hayward in Smash-Up, the Story of a Woman (1947) and Ida Lupino in The Man I Love (1947). She also appeared in short films, including Broadway Follies, (1937) a series of single-reel musicals from Columbia Pictures, and sang in cafe sequences in Humoresque (1946).

== Personal life ==
LaCentra married actor Paul Stewart in 1939. For years, they had a commuter marriage, as she worked in New York and he made films in Hollywood.

== Death ==
On June 1, 1996, LaCentra died at age 86 of a heart attack at her home in Los Angeles.
