= Ten Cents a Dance (1945 film) =

1945 film by Will Jason

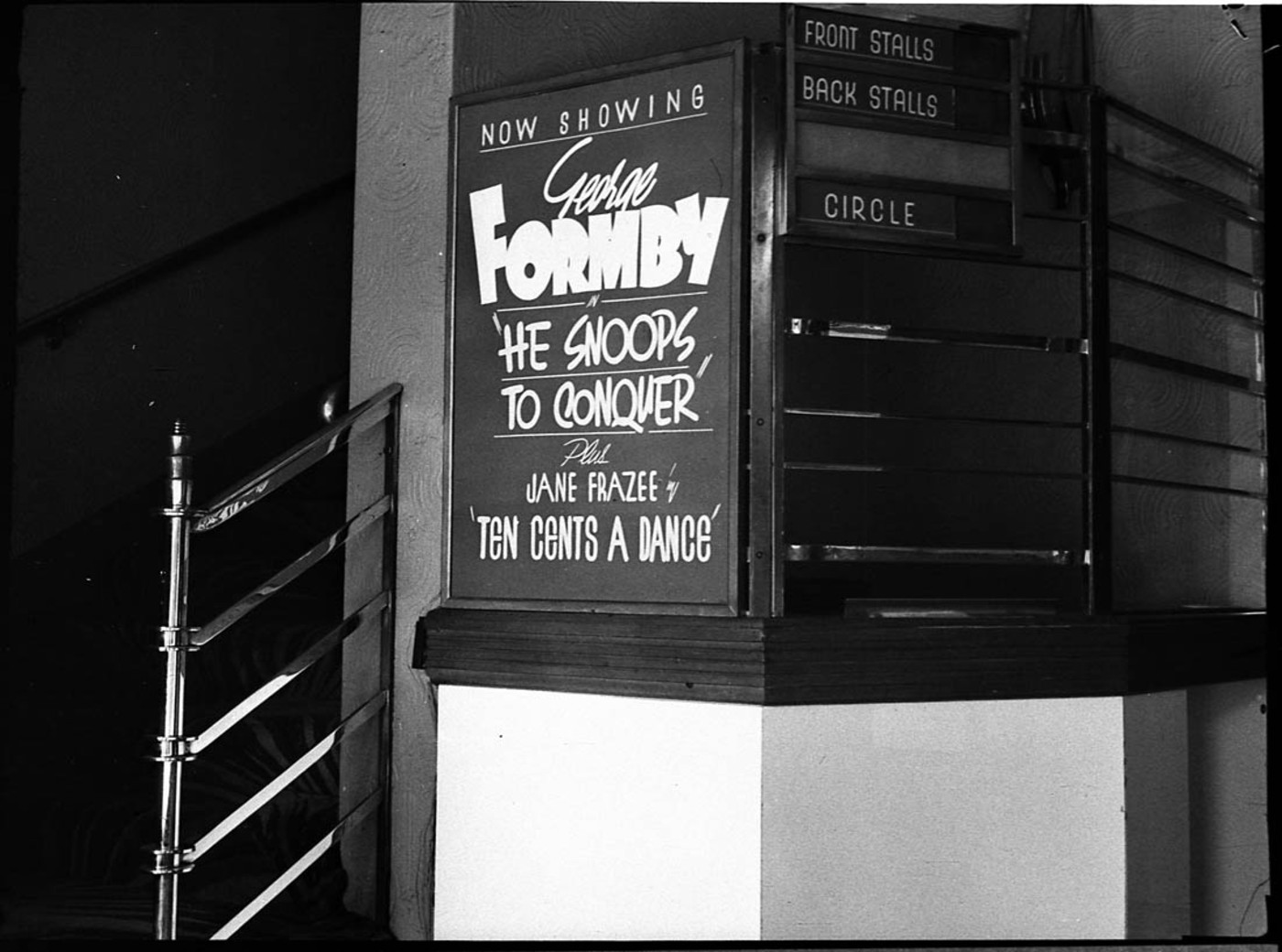
- Ten Cents a Dance is the second feature at a cinema in Australia
- Directed by: Will Jason
- Written by: Morton Grant
- Produced by: Michael Kraike
- Starring: Jane Frazee; Jimmy Lloyd; Mark Roberts; Joan Woodbury
- Cinematography: Benjamin Kline
- Edited by: James Sweeney
- Music by: Joan Brooks
- Production company: Columbia Pictures
- Distributed by: Columbia Pictures
- Release date: June 7, 1945
- Running time: 60 minutes
- Country: United States
- Language: English

Ten Cents a Dance is a 1945 American comedy film directed by Will Jason and starring Jane Frazee, Jimmy Lloyd, Mark Roberts, and Joan Woodbury. It was produced and distributed by Columbia Pictures.

== Plot ==
Privates Billy Sparks and Ted Kimball make use of their thirty-six-hour leave from the service to spend an evening at the Merryland Dance Hall, looking for suitable easy dames to court. Ted is the financially strong of the two men, but always lets Billy take care of the money, since he is afraid of gold digging girls.

At the dance hall, Billy is instantly attracted to the club's alluring singer Jeannie Hollis. Unfortunately she is already taken by the questionable club owner, Breezy Walker. To attract Jeannie's attention, Bill starts bragging about his enormous wealth, and buys everyone in the club ten minutes' worth of dancing. His trick works, and Jeannie pays him more attention.

Billy is unaware that Jeannie needs $500 for her dancer friend Joyce, who is in need of a surgical operation after a car accident. Breezy has denied to lend Jeannie the money but also told her that he can get the money if she finds him someone to cheat in a game of dice. Jeannie believes Billy can be this suitable victim, but doesn't know that Billy has his own ulterior motive and wants to hustle Billy for a much bigger sum. Billy tells Jeannie to keep Billy around for a dice game the next night.

Jeannie and another dancer, Babe, accompany Ted and Billy on a night on town. The evening ends with the four of them sitting on a roof top, watching the stars and talking about their hopes and dreams. It strikes Jeannie that she and Billy has many common goals in life, and Babe gets very friendly with Ted, completely unaware of his fortune.

After spending the night at the girls' boardinghouse the two couples go on a bicycle ride and picnic the next day. During the fun day, Jeannie starts to regret her plan together with Breezy, to rip Billy off, but Babe tries to calm her down, saying it is all for Joyce's benefit.

Another opportunity to hustle money off Billy arises, when Joyce's boxer friend Rocky agrees to lose his fight that evening, and a bet on this will double the money. The tip comes from the club bartender, Bits. However, it turns out Bits misunderstood about the fixed fight, and Rocky has agreed to stay upright for all six rounds. Jeannie loses $500 she borrows from Billy to bet on the fight. Billy isn't worried by this, but Jeannie is even more focused on the upcoming dice game to get the money she so desperately needs.

Ridden by guilt and infatuated by Billy, Jeannie eventually confesses the plan to hustle Billy's money, and Billy counters with confessing he has no money, and that they are all Ted's. Billy promises she will get the money to pay for Joyce's operation anyway, and asks for her hand in marriage. She accepts, and tells Breezy that the game is off. But Breezy and his goon Joey lock up Joyce, and tell Billy that Jeannie has left the club, and indicates that she is running away from Billy.

Billy assumes that Jeannie ran away because he did not have any money and agrees to play the dice game after all, to try to win some money of his own.

Breezy implies that Jeannie took off because she does not want to marry Billy, and the disappointed soldier assumes it is because of his lack of money. Billy knows that the other players have been ordered to let him win for the first few rounds, and intends to use this to his advantage.

Jeannie tries to stop Billy from playing the game, starting a brawl at the club, and Joey turns off all the lights to stop it. Billy manages to escape in the dark, and is told by Babe that Jeannie is captured by Breezy. Bill succeeds in rescuing Jeannie, and both couples reunite and spend the last hours of the soldiers' leave together. When they finally leave, Ted tells Babe that he is the wealthy one.

== Cast ==
- Jane Frazee as Jeanne Hollis
- Jimmy Lloyd as Billy Sparks
- Mark Roberts as Ted Kimball, III (credited as Robert Scott)
- Joan Woodbury as Babe
- John Calvert as Breezy Walker
- George McKay as Bits

== See also ==
- Taxi dancer
