= To the Shores of Tripoli =

1942 film by H. Bruce Humberstone

- Theatrical release poster
- Directed by: H. Bruce Humberstone
- Screenplay by: Lamar Trotti
- Story by: Steve Fisher
- Produced by: Darryl F. Zanuck
- Starring: John Payne; Maureen O'Hara; Randolph Scott
- Cinematography: Edward Cronjager; Harry Jackson; William V. Skall
- Edited by: Allen McNeil
- Music by: Alfred Newman
- Distributed by: 20th Century-Fox
- Release date: March 24, 1942; (San Diego)
- Running time: 86 minutes
- Country: United States
- Language: English
- Box office: $2,359,000 (US rentals)

To the Shores of Tripoli is a 1942 American Technicolor war film directed by H. Bruce Humberstone and starring John Payne, Maureen O'Hara and Randolph Scott. The film was produced by Darryl F. Zanuck. Its cinematography was nominated for an Academy Award in 1943.

Titled after a lyric in the Marines' Hymn, which contains the phrase "... to the shores of Tripoli" (which is, itself, a reference to the Battle of Derne), the film is one of the last of the pre-Pearl Harbor service films. When the film was in post-production the Pearl Harbor attack occurred, causing the studio to shoot a new ending in which Payne's character re-enlists.

The supporting cast features Nancy Kelly, Maxie Rosenbloom, Harry Morgan, and Alan Hale Jr.

== Plot ==
Wealthy Culver Military Academy drop-out and playboy Chris Winters enlists in the U.S. Marine Corps, where he meets his drill instructor Gunnery Sergeant Dixie Smith and falls in love with a Navy nurse, Lieutenant Mary Carter. Smith receives a letter from Winters's father, Captain Christopher Winters, about his playboy son. GySgt. Smith had served in World War I under the elder Winter, and he affectionately calls Winters "The Skipper". Chris Winters cannot understand why officers and enlisted men do not associate under the non-fraternization policy, even if the officer is a woman and the enlisted man is a male.

Chris's society girlfriend Helene Hunt wants Chris to get a cushy civilian job in Washington, D.C., and to make this happen, she uses her uncle's power and her influence on the base commander, General Gordon. Smith gives the younger Winters an opportunity to demonstrate his leadership qualities by drilling his platoon. To Smith's amusement, the Marines mock Chris and perform slapstick antics during the drill as Winters marches them away. As Smith is enjoying himself, the platoon marches back and near perfectly performs close-order drills. Smith is greatly surprised until he looks over the platoon and notices several Marines have black eyes, chipped teeth, and bruises. Chris Winters says, "I was captain of the boxing team at Culver."

Winters is selected for Sea School and, on gunnery practice during naval maneuvers, he bravely saves Dixie Smith's life while repairing gunnery targets. Chris picks a fight with Smith. However, Smith claims that he struck the first blow, so that (by being busted in rank for his confessed offense) Smith will save Chris from the Naval Prison. Despite winning the respect of Dixie Smith and his fellow Marines, Chris decides to leave the Marines.

At this point, Chris hears the news of the Pearl Harbor attack while driving in a car with Helene. The road is blocked by his old platoon marching to a Navy transport ship. Chris Winters runs to Sgt. Smith to re-enlist; Chris enters the ranks that close up as he dresses in his old uniform from his satchel; he tosses away his civilian clothes and is in uniform except for his two-toned shoes. On the transport ship, he is reunited with Mary Carter.

== Cast ==
- John Payne as Chris Winters Jr.
- Maureen O'Hara as Mary Carter
- Randolph Scott as Sgt. Dixie Smith
- Nancy Kelly as Helene Hunt
- William Tracy as Johnny Dent
- Max 'Slapsie Maxie' Rosenbloom as Okay Jones
- Harry Morgan as Mouthy (as Henry Morgan)
- Edmund MacDonald as Butch
- Russell Hicks as Maj. Wilson
- Margaret Early as Susie
- Minor Watson as Captain Christopher Winters Sr.
- Alan Hale Jr. as Tom Hall
- Richard Lane as Lieutenant
- John Hamilton as Gen. Gordon

== Production ==
George Raft was meant to star but could not get released from Warner Bros. John Payne was going to star in Song of the Islands but was assigned to this movie instead; Victor Mature replaced Payne on Song of the Islands.

The original planned ending was a simple romantic coupling with Maureen O'Hara's Navy nurse, but after Pearl Harbor, it switched to John Payne signing up for war.

Portions of the film were shot at Marine Corps Recruit Depot San Diego.

== Reception ==
Contemporary reviews were generally positive. Bosley Crowther of The New York Times expressed disappointment in the film, calling it "a compound of familiar cliches ... If this film is a fair estimation of Marine discipline and tradition, then wire Congress. For, with typical cinematic license, it assumes that one arrogant kid, protected by a sergeant's strange sentiment, could violate every rule in the book. Further, it does not lay emphasis upon a genuine esprit de corps. Contrary to military nature, the Marines fall in around a self-willed lad." Variety, however, wrote that the film "has landed well up to the front of the series of army, navy and air corps features which are doing good business, helped no little by current events ... Payne and Scott make an entertaining pair of fighters." Harrison's Reports called it "A fine picture ... The direction and acting are of high standard." Film Daily wrote: "No finer masterpiece of raw, red-blooded, thumping action has come out of Hollywood's studios." John Mosher of The New Yorker found that the target practice scenes had "a quiet charm" and wrote that "No one could look more military than Randolph Scott."

The Marines credit the movie as the biggest single recruitment aid in 1942. In 1940, before Pearl Harbor, there were only 19,400 Marines; when World War II ended there were 485,052 Marines and this number was subsequently reduced to 77,000 as the United States de-mobilized.

Though a critical and financial success, author Leon Uris ridicules the film in his reaction of Marines who see it in Battle Cry.
