= Kansas City Confidential =

1952 film directed by Phil Karlson

- Theatrical release poster
- Directed by: Phil Karlson
- Screenplay by: George Bruce; Harry Essex
- Story by: Rowland Brown; Harold Greene
- Produced by: Edward Small
- Starring: John Payne; Coleen Gray
- Cinematography: George E. Diskant
- Edited by: Buddy Small
- Music by: Paul Sawtell
- Production companies: Associated Players and Producers; Edward Small Productions
- Distributed by: United Artists
- Release dates: November 11, 1952 (United States); November 28, 1952 (New York)
- Running time: 99 minutes
- Country: United States
- Language: English

Kansas City Confidential (released in the United Kingdom as The Secret Four) is a 1952 American crime film noir directed by Phil Karlson and starring John Payne and Coleen Gray.

== Plot ==
Kansas City Confidential (1952)

The ruthless Mr. Big is timing the arrival of an armored car collecting money from a bank and a flower delivery truck driven by deliveryman Joe Rolfe. He plans to rob the armored car with Peter Harris, Boyd Kane and Tony Romano, men whom he interviewed while wearing a mask so that they cannot identify him. The plan, which includes a duplicate flower truck, proceeds as planned, and the crooks also wear masks to prevent identification. The gang arrives in the lookalike floral truck as Rolfe, unaware, drives away. The gang subdues the armored-car crew, grabs the money and flees. Mr. Big gives each gang member a torn playing card and tells them that, in case something goes wrong and Mr. Big is unable to connect with them, the cards will identify them to whoever he sends. The other members await their payment in Mexico.

Police arrest Rolfe and try to extract a confession while he maintains his innocence. He is released when his alibi is verified and the real robbery vehicle is found. Rolfe loses his job and resolves to find the criminals and clear his name. He learns that Harris has fled the city. Believing that he must be one of the robbers, Rolfe pursues him to Tijuana, where Rolfe forces Harris to reveal the gang's meeting place. At the airport, police recognize Harris and kill him. Rolfe realizes that he can impersonate Harris. In Harris’ luggage, he finds the mask and torn playing card.

In Borados, Rolfe meets Kane and Romano but does not know that Mr. Big is also there. His true identity is revealed to be that of Tim Foster, a former high-ranking policeman who was forced to retire when his name was linked to a scandal. Foster's conversation with insurance investigator Andrews reveals his plan: Foster never intended for his gang to split the money and escape. He will spring a trap on them, pretend that he solved the robbery, collect the 25% reward and possibly reclaim his job with the police.

Foster's plan is derailed when his daughter Helen, a law student, arrives. She has spoken to the mayor, who agreed to investigate the scandal that cost him his job, but Foster does not wish to return. She tells him that she met Rolfe and liked him. That night, Rolfe uses a game of poker as a pretext to show the gang members the torn card. Kane and Romano react, but Foster, knowing that Rolfe is not Harris, does not. Rolfe catches Romano searching his room and beats him, and they agree to cooperate until the money is split. The next day, Rolfe is beaten by Kane and Romano. Kane knows that Rolfe is an impostor because he was in prison with Harris. Helen arrives but Rolfe compels Romano and Kane to leave them alone.

Foster, as Mr. Big, writes notes to Rolfe, Kane and Romano to meet him on his boat. Before this can happen, Kane and Romano try to ambush Rolfe, who admits his identity and insists on receiving Harris’ share. Kane and Romano waylay Rolfe and discover that he is heading to the boat. All three are driven there by Foster, pretending to be fishing. They still do not know that he is Mr. Big. On board, Rolfe escapes and finds the money that Foster had conspicuously placed. Romano, gun in hand, confronts him. To buy time, Rolfe shows him the money. Romano, planning to keep it all, kills Kane. Foster arrives but says too much, and Rolfe deduces that he is Mr. Big. In the gunfight that follows, Foster kills Romano, but Romano fatally shoots him. As Foster is dying, he tells Rolfe of his one wish that Helen should not learn of his duplicity. With his dying breath, he tells Andrews that Rolfe was his source and deserves the $300,000 reward for having helped recover the stolen money. With his name cleared, Rolfe and Helen passionately kiss.

== Cast ==
- John Payne as Joe Rolfe
- Coleen Gray as Helen Foster
- Preston Foster as Tim Foster
- Neville Brand as Boyd Kane
- Lee Van Cleef as Tony Romano
- Jack Elam as Pete Harris
- Dona Drake as Teresa
- Mario Siletti as Tomaso
- Howard Negley as (Scott) Andrews
- Carleton Young as Martin
- Don Orlando as Diaz
- Ted Ryan as Morelli

== Production ==
Kansas City Confidential is the only film produced by Edward Small's short-lived Associated Players and Producers, a company formed by Small, Sol Lesser and Sam Briskin. It is the first of a 13-movie deal Small that signed with United Artists in 1952, with ten to be produced in the first year. John Payne owned a 25% stake in the profits.

The film was originally titled Kansas City 117, based on a police code. Small bought the title Kansas City Confidential from Jack Lait and Lee Mortimer.

Filming began on June 4, 1952 and location shooting occurred on Santa Catalina Island, California, which served as the setting of a Mexican village resort.

== Release ==
The film's world premiere was held at the Woods Theatre in Chicago on November 4, 1952.

== Reception ==
In a contemporary review for The New York Times, critic Bosley Crowther wrote:

An uncommon lot of face slapping. stomach punching and kicking in the groin, the standard manifestations of the virulence of mobsters and criminals on the screen, is the only perceptible distinction... And the fact that most of the violence is committed by the hero, an ex-con who is out to clear himself of suspicion of being involved in a big bank robbery, executed by a quartet of masked hoodlums. doesn't mitigate its ugliness one whit... The screen play by George Bruce and Harry Essex is an illogical fable of crime, the direction by Phil Karlson is routine and the leading role is bluntly acted by John Payne. Neville Brand, Jack Elam and Preston Foster do not shine in other roles, except as drab exponents of the violence that suffuses and corrupts this measly film. The collection of a reward by the hero suggests, in this case, that crime does pay.

Critic Philip K. Scheuer of the Los Angeles Times wrote: "The picture, as directed by Phil Karlson in sharp close-ups, builds taut suspense while it is centered on details of the crime; dips noticeably with a shift of scene to a Latin-American place called Borados, and then regains some of its holding power for the shooting finish."

In a review for Variety, George Gilbert wrote: "With exception of the denouement, director Phil Karlson reined his cast in a grim atmosphere that develops momentum through succeeding reels. But failure of the windup to be a punchier one is also a scripting fault. Be that as it may, performances of the players do much to make the action credible."

The British Film Institute's BFI Companion to Crime notes, "Buoyed by hard-boiled dialogue and boasting an impressive triumvirate of subsidiary hoodlums in Brand, Elam and Van Cleef, this is an ingenious variation on the "rogue cop" premise... Payne's embittered ex-con is a characteristic Karlson protagonist (compare 99 River Street 1953) and the film provides a suitable showcase for the director's acerbic, muscular style."

Film historian Leonard Maltin called Kansas City Confidential a "tough action drama" and awarded it three stars (out of four).

== Legacy ==
Because its copyright was not renewed in the 28th year after publication, the film entered the public domain in the United States in 1980.

The film's popularity prompted a series produced by Edward Small: New York Confidential (1955), Chicago Confidential (1957) and Hong Kong Confidential (1958).

The plot inspired Quentin Tarantino's Reservoir Dogs.

== See also ==
- L.A. Confidential, a 1997 neo-noir film with similar themes
- List of films in the public domain in the United States
- List of United Artists films
- List of hood films
