= Talk About a Lady =

1946 film by George Sherman

- Directed by: George Sherman
- Written by: Robert Hardy Andrews; Barry Trivers; Richard Weil; Ted Thomas
- Produced by: Michael Kraike
- Starring: Forrest Tucker; Jinx Falkenburg; Trudy Marshall
- Cinematography: Henry Freulich
- Edited by: James Sweeney
- Music by: Marlin Skiles
- Production company: Columbia Pictures
- Distributed by: Columbia Pictures
- Release date: March 28, 1946
- Running time: 70 minutes
- Country: United States
- Language: English

Talk About a Lady is a 1946 American musical film directed by George Sherman and starring Forrest Tucker, Jinx Falkenburg and Trudy Marshall. It was produced and distributed by Columbia Pictures.

== Cast ==
- Jinx Falkenburg as Janie Clark
- Forrest Tucker as Bart Manners
- Joe Besser as Roly Q. Entwhistle
- Trudy Marshall as Toni Marlowe
- Richard Lane as Duke Randall
- Jimmy Little as Buffalo
- Frank Sully as Rocky Jordan
- Jack Davis as Carleton Vane
- Robert Regent as Arthur Harrison
- Mira McKinney as Letitia Harrison
- Robin Raymond as 'Peaches' Barkeley
- Stan Kenton as Orchestra Leader
