= Kill Your Darlings (2006 film) =

- Theatrical release poster
- Directed by: Björne Larson
- Written by: Björne Larson
- Starring: Lolita Davidovich; Andreas Wilson; Fares Fares; Alexander Skarsgård; Julie Benz; John Larroquette; Greg Germann; Benito Martinez
- Distributed by: Sony Pictures Releasing International
- Release date: 12 April 2006
- Running time: 94 minutes
- Country: Sweden
- Language: Swedish

Kill Your Darlings is a 2006 film directed by Björne Larson and written by Björne Larson and Johan Sandström. In an interview with Svenska Dagbladet, Larson said that the film is based on a real event in his life when he met a seemingly nice man at an internet cafe in Los Angeles, who ended up leaving Larson bound and restrained in a desert. The film features a cast of many of the most popular contemporary Swedish actors (Fares Fares, father and son Stellan and Alexander Skarsgård, and Andreas Wilson from Oscar-nominated Evil), some less famous U.S. actors, Julie Benz and Greg Germann, and Canadian Lolita Davidovich.

The title seems to be a reference to the popular advice for writers, "Murder your darlings", commonly misattributed but written by Sir Arthur Quiller-Couch.

== Cast ==
- Lolita Davidovich as Lola
- Andreas Wilson as Erik
- Fares Fares as Omar
- Alexander Skarsgård as Geert
- Julie Benz as Katherine
- John Larroquette as Dr. Bangley
- Greg Germann as Stevens
- Benito Martinez as Officer Jones
- John Savage as Rock
- Terry Moore as Ella Toscana
- Skye McCole Bartusiak as Sunshine
- Michelle Bonilla as Susan (as Michelle C. Bonilla)
- Scott Williamson as Rob Wolfton
- Ashlyn Sanchez as Meadow
- Michael Cutt as Lou (as Michael J. Cutt)
- Stellan Skarsgård as Erik's Father
