= Beverly Lunsford =

American actress (1945–2019)

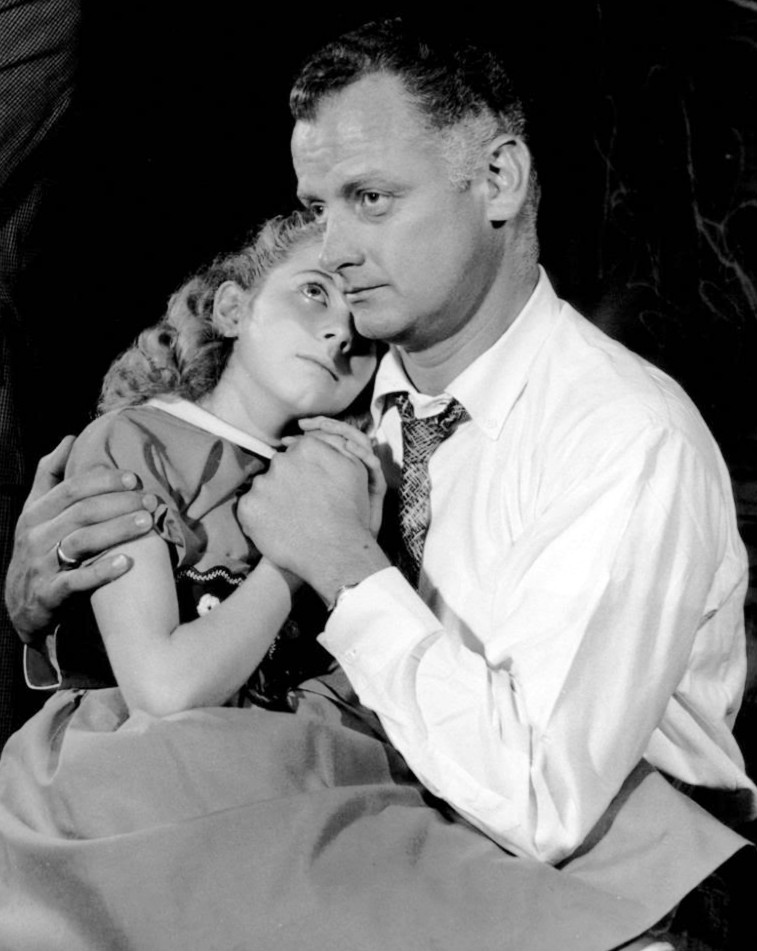
- Photo of Art Carney and Beverly Lunsford from the Broadway play The Rope Dancers
- Born: Beverly Jane Lunsford; January 5, 1945; Atlanta, Georgia, U.S.
- Died: May 22, 2019 (aged 74); Canton, Georgia, U.S.
- Occupation: Actress
- Years active: 1954–1969
- Notable work: The Intruder Leave It to Beaver

Beverly Lunsford (January 5, 1945 – May 22, 2019) was an American actress best known for playing Shirley Fletcher on the television sitcom Leave It to Beaver.

== Early life ==
Lunsford was born in Atlanta, Georgia, the daughter of Mr. and Mrs. L. H. Lunsford.

== Career ==
Lunsford starred in a CBS-TV production of The Sleeping Beauty on November 25, 1955. Her early career encompassed several stage performances as well as television and movies. She first appeared at the age of 12 in the 1957 Broadway production of The Rope Dancers, starring Siobhán McKenna and Art Carney. Lunsford's big-screen work started soon after. She appeared in several anthology dramas, then progressed to guest-starring roles on television series such as National Velvet, My Three Sons, and Leave It to Beaver. She temporarily played the part of Amy Ames Britton Kincaid on the CBS soap opera The Secret Storm, during which she filled in for the main star, Jada Rowland. She had previously appeared on The Edge of Night.

Lunsford's starring role came in 1961 when she played in Roger Corman's topical drama The Intruder. The film dealt with race relations in the American South in the wake of the Brown vs. Board of Education Supreme Court ruling in 1954.

In 1963, Lunsford was cast in Herbert L. Strock's horror film The Crawling Hand. Lunsford made her last screen appearance in 1969, although she still attended various public celebrity-oriented events until her death in 2019.

In the mid-1970s Lunsford began working as productions operations manager at WAGA-TV in Atlanta.

== Personal life ==
Lunsford married Joe Jones, a self-employed trucking agent, in 1972.

She died on May 22, 2019 of kidney cancer. She was buried at Sunrise Memorial Gardens in Jasper, Georgia.

== Filmography ==
Year	Title	Role
1957	That Night!	Betsy Bowden
1962	The Intruder	Ella McDaniel
1963	The Crawling Hand	Patsy Townsen
1968	Jennie: Wife/Child	Jennie Pekingpraw

== Television ==
Year	Title	Role
1956	Robert Montgomery Presents	Mark Pendel
1955–1958	United States Steel Hour	Sylvia/Allison
1960–1961	National Velvet	Marilyn Winters in "The Riding Mistress" (with Roger Mobley)
1962	Leave It to Beaver	Shirley Fletcher
1969	My Three Sons	Betty Crawford
