= Salam Pakistan =

- Directed by: Hassan Zee
- Written by: Hassan Zee
- Produced by: Hassan Zee
- Starring: Naghma; Ali Raza; Meerab Khan; Shabbir Mirza; Saeed Anwar
- Production company: Z Films
- Release date: 25 March 2018
- Running time: 118 minutes
- Country: Pakistan
- Language: Urdu

Salam Pakistan is a romantic comedy directed by Hassan Zee, starring Naghma, Ali Raza, Meerab Khan, and Shabbir Mirza.

== Plot ==
A second generation Pakistani-American arrives in his family's ancestral town to discover his place in the world and confronts a rich historic culture while grappling with gender inequality and the subjugation of women tied to that culture.

== Cast ==
- Naghma as Nazneen
- Ali Raza as Omar
- Meerab Khan as Diya
- Shabbir Mirza as Dada
