= Marla Adams =

American actress (1938–2024)

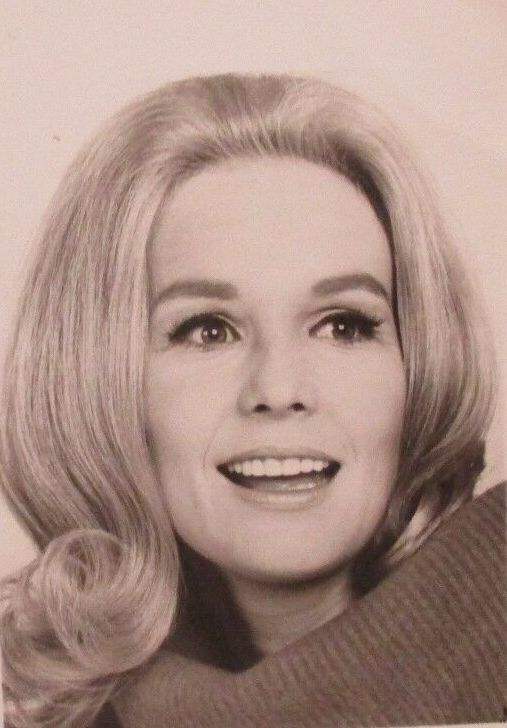
- Marla Adams on the set of The Secret Storm in 1968.
- Born: August 28, 1938; Ocean City, New Jersey, U.S.
- Died: April 25, 2024 (aged 85); Los Angeles, California, U.S.
- Education: American Academy of Dramatic Arts
- Occupation: Actress
- Years active: 1958–2020
- Known for: The Secret Storm; The Young and the Restless
- Children: 2
- Awards: Daytime Emmy Award for Outstanding Supporting Actress in a Drama Series

Marla Vene Adams (August 28, 1938 – April 25, 2024) was an American actress. She was best known for playing the roles of Belle Clemens on the CBS soap opera The Secret Storm (1968 to 1974) and Dina Abbott Mergeron on the CBS soap opera The Young and the Restless (1983 to 1986, 1991, 1996, 2008, 2017 to 2020). She won a Daytime Emmy Award for Outstanding Supporting Actress in a Drama Series for her role on The Young and the Restless in 2021. She had been nominated in the same category in 2018.

== Early life ==
Adams was born in Ocean City, New Jersey. As a teenager, she won the Miss Ocean City and Miss Cape May pageants. She was named Miss Diamond Jubilee at the 75th anniversary celebration of her hometown in 1954. Adams graduated from Ocean City High School in 1956. She studied acting at the American Academy of Dramatic Arts in New York.

== Career ==
Adams' early theater roles include The Mikado, The Devil's a Stranger, Deathtrap, Inherit the Wind (co-starring with Ed Begley Jr.), and Roger the Sixth (co-starring with Dorothy Lamour).

The day she graduated from the American Academy of Dramatic Arts, Adams won the role of Ottilie Schill in the original Broadway production of The Visit. The play ran from May 5, 1958 to November 29, 1958 at the Morosco Theatre. She co-starred with Alfred Lunt and Lynn Fontanne. She made her film debut, appearing opposite Natalie Wood in the period drama Splendor in the Grass (1961).

Adams briefly appeared as Mildred Deal on General Hospital in 1963. She was cast as Belle Clemens on The Secret Storm in 1968, playing the role until the show's cancellation in 1974. She was the show's reigning villainess, stopping at almost nothing to destroy the life of the show's leading heroine, Amy Ames (Jada Rowland).

Adams made guest appearances on The New Dick Van Dyke Show, Harry O, Marcus Welby, M.D., and Barnaby Jones. She played Ruth in the television film The Secret Night Caller (1975), co-starring with Robert Reed. She guest starred on Emergency!, Adam-12, and Starsky & Hutch. Adams appeared in the comedy film Special Delivery (1976). She continued to land guest starring roles on The Streets of San Francisco, The Love Boat, Carter Country, Hart to Hart, Archie Bunker's Place, and Happy Days. In 1981, she appeared on stage in a production of The Max Factor, co-starring with Cesar Romero.

In 1983, Adams briefly played the role of Myrna Clegg on the CBS soap opera Capitol. She was then cast as Dina Abbott Mergeron on the CBS soap opera The Young and the Restless. The character was the ex-wife of John Abbott and the mother of his three children. Adams began airing in the role on May 27, 1983.

Adams played Cathy in the television film Concrete Beat (1984). She also appeared in the film Gotcha! (1985). In 1986, she left the role of Dina on The Young and the Restless when her contract ended. She guest starred on Hill Street Blues, Matlock, Who's the Boss? and Beauty and the Beast. She starred on stage in a production of The Odd Couple, co-starring with Lee Meriwether. Adams played Shirley in the television film Maybe Baby (1988).

She guest starred on an episode of Empty Nest in 1989. Adams played Helen Mullins on the NBC soap opera Generations from 1989 to 1990. Adams then played Beth Logan on the CBS soap opera The Bold and the Beautiful in December 1990. The role had previously been played by Nancy Burnett. Adams made a brief return to The Young and the Restless as Dina in 1991. She starred on stage in the musical Les Ms. at the Odyssey Theatre in Los Angeles. She also co-starred with Don Knotts in the play Last of the Red Hot Lovers.

Adams guest starred on Perfect Strangers and The Golden Girls. She appeared in the television film White Hot: The Mysterious Murder of Thelma Todd (1991). She also played Gladys Baker, the mother of Marilyn Monroe, in the television film Marilyn and Me (1991). She made a guest appearance on Baywatch in 1992.

Adams briefly returned to The Young and the Restless as Dina in 1996. She appeared on the NBC soap opera Days of Our Lives as Dr. Claire McIntyre, first airing on February 3, 1999. She played the role until September 2, 1999. She also had a recurring role as Betsy Harper on Walker, Texas Ranger from 2000 to 2001. In 2000, she played First Lady Matthews in the television film The President's Man, starring Chuck Norris and Dylan Neal.

She reprised her role as Dina for three episodes on The Young and the Restless in 2008 when Katherine Chancellor was presumed dead. Adams returned on a recurring basis nine years later, first airing on May 3, 2017. The character of Dina was diagnosed with Alzheimer's disease. She received her first Daytime Emmy Award nomination for Outstanding Supporting Actress in 2018.

Adams made her last film appearance in Beneath the Leaves in 2019. In 2020, it was announced that she would be leaving The Young and the Restless when Dina died from Alzheimer's. Her final air date was October 20, 2020. Adams won the Daytime Emmy Award for Outstanding Supporting Actress in a Drama Series on June 25, 2021.

== Personal life and death ==
Adams met her first husband, George Oates, at the American Academy of Dramatic Arts. They were married for seven years, then divorced after he left her for her best friend. She later remarried and divorced again. Adams had two children, a son and a daughter. She also had two grandchildren.

Her son appeared in an episode of The Secret Storm, bringing her character, Belle Clemens, a red rose. He continued to send Adams a red rose every year after that for Mother's Day.

She died of cancer in Los Angeles on April 25, 2024, at the age of 85.

== Filmography ==
=== Film ===
Year	Title	Role	Notes
1961	Splendor in the Grass	June	
1976	Special Delivery	Mrs. Hubert Zane	
1985	Gotcha!	Maria	
2019	Beneath the Leaves	Nadine	

=== Television ===
Years	Title	Role	Notes
1963	General Hospital	Mildred Deal	
1968–1974	The Secret Storm	Belle Clemens Britton Kincaid	Contract role
1973	The New Dick Van Dyke Show	Gloria; Brenda	Episode: "What Your Best Friend Doesn't Know"
1974	Harry O	Janet Rankin	Episode: "Shadows at Noon"
1974–1976	Marcus Welby, M.D.	Olivia Randall; Marian Blakely	3 episodes
1974–1978	Barnaby Jones	Eleanor Raymond; Sandra Lassiter; Audrey Meyer	3 episodes
1975	The Secret Night Caller	Ruth	Television film Uncredited role
1975	Adam-12	Mildred Bell	Episode: "Dana Hall"
1975	Starsky & Hutch	Sheila	Episode: "Captain Dobey, You're Dead!"
1975	Mobile One		Episode: "Murder at Fourteen"
1975–1978	Emergency!	Mrs. Anderson; Soap Opera Patient; Rita Hudson	3 episodes
1976	Delvecchio	Mrs. Fred Nailor	Episode: "Wax Job"
1977	Phyllis	Mrs. Snyder	Episode: "A Baby Makes Six"
1977	Kingston: Confidential	Lila Perry	Episode: "Eight Columns Across the Top"
1977	The Streets of San Francisco	Cecilia Roman	Episode: "Breakup"
1978	The Love Boat	Arlene Simpson; Glenda Fairbanks	2 episodes
1979	Carter Country	Florabelle	Episode: "Teddy's Folly"
1981	Hart to Hart	Evelyn Carney	Episode: "What Becomes a Murder Most?"
1982	Archie Bunker's Place	Ann Marlowe	Episode: "Archie's Night Out"
1982	Filthy Rich	Muffy Newkirk	Episode: "Take This Job and Love It: Part 2"
1983	Happy Days	Millicent "Milly" Pfister	Episode: "Hello, Pfisters"
1983	Bring 'Em Back Alive	Martha Nielsen	Episode: "Storm Warning"
1983	Trauma Center	Dr. Chas Sternhause's Secretary	Episode: "Breakthrough"
1983	Capitol	Myrna Clegg	
1983–2020	The Young and the Restless	Dina Abbott Mergeron	Contract role (1983–1986); Guest appearances and Recurring role (1991; 1996; 2008; 2017–2020)
1984	Concrete Beat	Cathy Lord	Television film
1987	Hill Street Blues	Mrs. Fein	Episode: "She's So Fein"
1987	Who's the Boss?	Connie	Episode: "A Farewell to Nick"
1988	Matlock	Roselle	Episode: "The Hucksters"
1988	Beauty and the Beast	Helen Thompson	Episode: "Down to a Sunless Sea"
1988	Maybe Baby	Shirley	Television film
1989	Empty Nest	Elna	Episode: "Man of the Year"
1989–1990	Generations	Helen Mullins	
1990	Adam-12	Carol Miller	Episode: "Neighbors"
1990	The Bold and the Beautiful	Beth Logan	Recurring role
1991	Perfect Strangers	Mrs. Catherine Lyons	Episode: "Speak, Memory"
1991	The Golden Girls	Woman No.1	Episode: "Witness"
1991	White Hot: The Mysterious Murder of Thelma Todd	Mrs. Ford	Television film
1991	Marilyn and Me	Gladys Baker	Television film
1992	Baywatch	Trish McClain	Episode: "Game of Chance"
1992	Sisters	Madeline Brady	Episode: "The Best Seats in the House"
1994	The Good Life	Kate Donnetti	Episode: "The Statue"
1994	Columbo	Sheila Byrnes	Episode: "Undercover"
1997	In the House	Mrs. Tuckman	Episode: "You're the One"
1997	Nash Bridges	Mrs. Van Pelt	Episode: "Gun Play"
1998	The Tony Danza Show	Mrs. Paxton	Episode: "Vision Quest"
1999	Days of Our Lives	Claire McIntyre	Recurring role
1999	Time of Your Life	Lauren	Episode: "The Time She Got Mobbed"
2000	The President's Man	First Lady Matthews	Television film
2000–2001	Walker, Texas Ranger	Betsy Harper	3 episodes

== Awards and nominations ==
Year	Award	Category	Title	Result	Ref.
2018	Daytime Emmy Award	Outstanding Supporting Actress in a Drama Series	The Young and the Restless	Nominated	
2021	Daytime Emmy Award	Outstanding Supporting Actress in a Drama Series	The Young and the Restless	Won	
