= Johan Hadorph =

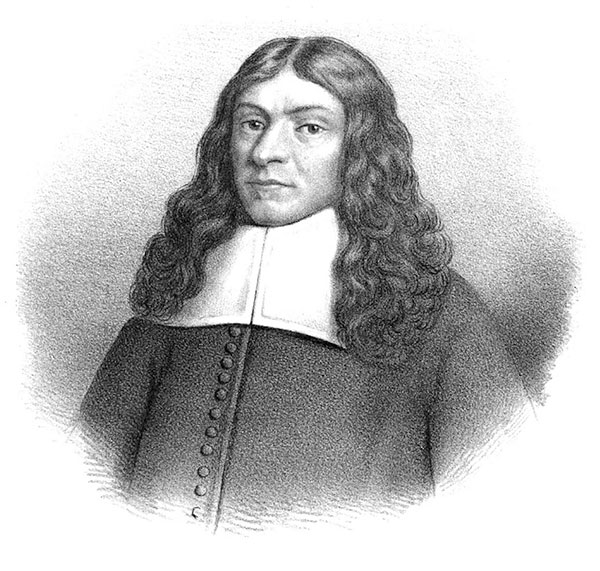
Johan Hadorph

Johan Hadorph (May 6, 1630 – July 12, 1693) was a Swedish director-general of the Central Board of National Antiquities.

He was appointed National Antiquarian at the government agency for antiquities, and he became its director-general. Hadorph documented ancient monuments during extensive voyages in Sweden. He collected a great many older manuscripts, such as collections of laws. He also made many drawings of runestones, and supervised the production of more than 1000 woodcuts of runestones.

== Family and nobility ==
He was born at Haddorp manor in Slaka parish in Östergötland, Sweden to Nils Jönsson, who belonged to the Lindsbrosläkten, the Lindsbro family, an old family traceable to the 14th century, and his wife Anna Hansdotter of the old family Upplänning. His father was the head of a royal farm (kronohemman). and a bailiff of Linköping whose brother, Olof, became the progenitor of the noble family Stiernadler. His mother was the daughter of the vicar of Norrköping Hans Matthiae Upplänning and Brita Holm, thus a niece of bishop Johannes Matthiae Gothus and assessor Peder Mattsson Upplänning Stiernfelt, ennobled Stiernfelt and introduced at House of Nobility. Her paternal grandfather was Matthias Petri Upplänning, a vicar of Västra Husby. Hadorph married in Skänninge to Elisabeth Dalina, the daughter of vicar Daniel Dalinus and Elisabet Nilsdotter Enander, a niece of the Bishop of Linköping Samuel Enander. In 1671 and in 1674, his estate received exemption from taxation and in 1672, he, his wife and their descendants were ennobled, a patent that was confirmed in 1681 but was not introduced at the House of Nobility in Stockholm until much later with his descendant Daniel Hadorph in the early 19th century. His sister, Christina, married national bookkeeper Olof Pedersson Krook, ennobled Ehrenkrook.

== Career ==
Calling himself Hadorph or Hadorphius, after the farm on which he grew up, he began to study at Uppsala University, where he was appointed secretary of the academy in 1660. He was then noticed for his strong interest in national antiquities by Magnus Gabriel De la Gardie and Count Erik Lindschöld (1634-1690). In 1666, he received a part of the salary of the director-general of the Central Board of National Antiquities, and he was appointed to be its seventh assessor in 1667.

In 1669, he was promoted to be the secretary of the National Archives. In the same year, he and Elias Brenner joined de la Gardie on an excursion through de la Gardie's fiefs, and Johan Hadorph made drawings of all the ancient monuments the party encountered. He also had access to de la Gardie's extensive library and made a Swedish verse translation of the history of Alexander the Great, which was published during 1672. In the same year, he joined King Charles XI of Sweden on his Eriksgata through central and southern Sweden during which he was obliged always to be present and explain all the ancient monuments and curiosities that caught the king's attention.

He received the whole position and salary as director-general of the Central Board of National Antiquities in 1679, when his co-director professor Olof Verelius was promoted to be the librarian of Uppsala University. In 1692, the Central Board of National Antiquities was transferred to Stockholm to function as an archive of antiquities rather than a college, and Johan Hadorph became its director. He died in the capital on July 12, 1693.

== Production ==
Hadorph was an assiduous and determined scholar, rather than a critical scientist. Unlike his co-assessors, he never published any Norse sagas, but he hired Icelanders and arranged that they could travel and procure manuscripts for the Board and make copies of them. In 1674–76, he published the old Swedish rhyming chronicles and the rhyming saga of Saint Olaf with extensive commentaries, something which is valuable to posterity, as many of the original manuscripts were destroyed in the Stockholm Palace fire of 1697. He also edited the rhymed romances which bear the name of princess Euphemia. He published a Swedish translation of a Latin history of Alexander the Great in 1672. In addition, he published several medieval Swedish provincial laws, beginning with the Scanian Law in 1676, but one of his most important works was the documentation of medieval letters.

As early as the 1650s, the future king Charles X Gustav of Sweden sent him on an expedition to Öland, where he made drawings of runestones. In 1671, he was authorized to travel through the country in the search of national antiquities, accompanied by a staff of artists. From 1674 onward, he undertook such excursions every year, often accompanied by assistant artists. His studies concerned runestones, ruined monasteries and churches, castles, tumuli and other monuments, manuscripts, folklore and popular ballads. He also undertook the first archaeological excavation in Sweden, which took place at Birka.

Johan Hadorph's collections constituted the basis of Swedish Museum of National Antiquities. A great number of runestones were depicted, and over 1000 such depictions were made into woodcuts under his supervision.

== Published works ==
- Dahlelagen 1676
- Skånelagen 1676
- Gothlands-laghen: på gammal göthiska med en historisk berättelse wid ändan, huruledes Gothland först år upfunnit och besatt, så och under Swes rijke ifran … 1687
- Bjärköarätten 1687
- Visby stadslag 1688
- Visby sjörätt 1689
- Alexandri Magni Historia på Svenska rijm 1672
- St Olaffs Saga på Svenska rijm 1675
- Två gamla Svenska rijmrönikor. Item en stor deel af the gamle konungars etc. Förlikningar, Försäkringar, etc. 1674–76
- Färentuna runstenar 1680

== See also ==
- Swedish National Heritage Board
- Swedish History Museum
- Uppland Runic Inscription 92, Hadorph-17th century drawing of this runestone
