= The Secret Storm =

American television soap opera (1954–1974)

- Title card for The Secret Storm, 1954
- Created by: Roy Winsor
- Starring: Peter Hobbs; Jada Rowland; Marla Adams
- Country of origin: United States
- No. of seasons: 20
- No. of episodes: 5,195

Production
- Running time: 15 minutes (1954–1962, approx. 11–12 minutes minus ads); 30 minutes (1962–1974, approx. 22 minutes minus ads)

Original release
- Network: CBS
- Release: February 1, 1954 – February 8, 1974

The Secret Storm is an American television soap opera that aired on CBS from February 1, 1954, to February 8, 1974. It was created by Roy Winsor, who also created the long-running soap operas Search for Tomorrow and Love of Life. Gloria Monty, of General Hospital fame, was a longtime director of the series.

Like most CBS soap operas of the time, such as Guiding Light and As the World Turns, The Secret Storm was broadcast live, and later taped, in New York at the CBS Broadcast Center on West 57th Street. At some point in the 1970s up until cancellation, it was taped at CBS Studio 54 at 221 West 26th Street in the Chelsea section of Manhattan.

== Plot ==
The story follows the Ames family, a prominent clan in the fictional Northeastern United States town of Woodbridge (eventually identified as being located in New York). The Ames family initially consisted of Peter, his wife Ellen, and their three children: Susan, Jerry, and Amy. However, Ellen was killed in the first episode and subsequent stories focused on Peter raising his three children. Lending a hand, however dubiously, was Peter's sister-in-law, as well as his former fiancée Pauline Rysdale (Haila Stoddard).

Despite Susan's and Pauline's efforts to derail any new romances in Peter's life, he eventually remarried twice. His first remarriage was to Myra Lake (June Graham), one of Amy's teachers, but that ended in divorce. His second and more successful remarriage was to divorcee Valerie Hill (Lori March), to whom he was married until his death.

Later, the villainous Belle Clemens (Marla Adams) was the main source of trouble for Woodbridge, taking over from Aunt Pauline, the show's original villain. When Belle's daughter Robin drowned in an accident, Belle blamed Amy for the death.

== Development ==
Amy was allowed to age in real time rather than suddenly aging as many younger soap characters did. Jada Rowland played the character with a few breaks for the duration of the program. Other actresses in the role included Beverly Lunsford, June Carter and Lynne Adams.

Actress/writer Stephanie Braxton and actor Dan Hamilton met while performing on the show, and later married. Lori March, who played Valerie Hill Ames for many years, later played the wife of her real-life husband Alexander Scourby. Actress Diana Muldaur also married co-star James Vickery.

Some performers who appeared on The Secret Storm and later achieved greater fame include Warren Berlinger, James Broderick, John Colicos, Christina Crawford, Jennifer Darling, Cliff DeYoung, Joan Hotchkis, Barnard Hughes, Don Galloway, Audrey Landers, Ken Kercheval, Ed Kemmer, Terry Kiser, Diane Ladd, Laurence Luckinbill, Biff McGuire, Kim Milford, Donna Mills, Robert Morse, George Reinholt, Jane Rose, Gary Sandy, Roy Scheider, Robin Strasser, Frank Sutton and Edward Winter.

Other well-known performers who appeared on the show include Joan Crawford (substituting for her daughter), Troy Donahue, Marjorie Gateson, Margaret Hamilton, Jeffrey Lynn, Alexander Scourby, Madeleine Sherwood and Frances Sternhagen.

Actress Bethel Leslie was at one time co-head writer. Other noted head writers include Jane and Ira Avery, and its final head writer Gabrielle Upton.

=== Joan Crawford ===
In 1968, Oscar-winning actress Joan Crawford, at the time over 60 years old, filled in for her ailing daughter, Christina, who portrayed Joan Borman Kane, a character aged just 24. The episodes were broadcast on October 25, 28, 29 and 30. Although no full shows with Crawford are known to exist, clips have appeared on YouTube. The 1981 film Mommie Dearest portrayed Crawford's appearance without specifying the name of the series.

== Broadcast history ==
CBS first placed The Secret Storm at 4:15 pm (3:15 Central) as a 15-minute program, sandwiched between The Brighter Day and On Your Account (later The Edge of Night). Beginning in 1957, it competed against ABC's American Bandstand, then a weekday show (the latter show was reduced to Saturdays-only in 1963).

On June 18, 1962, CBS extended The Secret Storm to 30 minutes, and The Brighter Day was moved to an early-morning time slot. The Secret Storm took over the 4:00 pm time slot, where it ran for six years and mainly competed against NBC's Match Game. However, in 1966, the Gothic soap opera Dark Shadows premiered on ABC, and that (later the Dating Game) prompted CBS to move The Secret Storm back an hour to 3:00 pm Eastern (2:00 Central) on September 9, 1968, facing NBC's fast-rising Another World & ABC's General Hospital.

The Secret Storm moved from black and white to color broadcasts on September 11, 1967.

After four years of mediocre ratings, CBS changed the show's timeslot to 3:30 Eastern on September 11, 1972, as part of a major overhaul of its daytime line-up. The Secret Storm followed Love is a Many Splendored Thing; That show was cancelled in 1973. CBS eventually returned The Secret Storm to its previous 4:00 pm time on March 26, 1973. However, its audience share, and ratings failed to keep it afloat in an increasingly cost-competitive network daytime scene.

Finally, as a result of pre-emptions mounting from key affiliates such as KPIX in San Francisco, and an economic recession causing a decline in ad revenues, CBS decided to cancel the serial in December 1973, and replace it with a less-expensive game show, Tattletales. This had also been the reason for the cancellations of Where the Heart Is and Love Is a Many Splendored Thing the previous year.

In all the turmoil of its later years, the main reason for the show's demise may have been CBS's choice to buy the show from the original sponsor/packager, American Home Products, in 1969. After CBS purchased the show, it suffered from numerous head writer and producer changes. AHP's primary task after reacquiring the rights to the show in 1974, the year CBS cancelled the show, was to continue the series by syndicating it elsewhere. However, NBC executive Lin Bolen rejected the show in favor of her own project, How to Survive a Marriage (which ran for one year and three months on that network), and ABC chose to use its daytime budget to buy out Agnes Nixon's soaps. Thus, American Home Products decided not to continue the show even in syndication, due to the lack of clearances among affiliates in the largest markets to justify continued production. The 5,195th and final episode was shown one week after the show's 20th anniversary.

=== Title sequences ===
The series had two distinctive opening visuals. The first was an illustration of a tree with windblown branches, used from the first episode until around 1960. The second was a live-action film clip of an ocean surf at high tide, crashing against the rocks.

For a brief period in 1967, The Secret Storm, in its first color days, featured shots of a town meant to represent the community Woodbridge. The opening was similar to that of the primetime drama Peyton Place.

For the last few years of the show, the theme song was the theme from the second movement of the Double Concerto by Johannes Brahms. The in-house organist was Charles Paul, later replaced (as Paul was at Love of Life) by Eddie Layton. Carey Gold provided a more contemporary sound with synthesizer and piano during the show's later years. Paul returned as Love of Life's final musical director.

== Characters ==
=== Amy Ames ===
Amy Kincaid (née Ames, previously Rysdale and Britton) was the main heroine on The Secret Storm and was mostly played by Jada Rowland, who grew up in the role, a rarity for any soap opera character. During a break, Beverly Lunsford replaced Rowland in the part.

Amy was the youngest child of Peter and Ellen Ames of the fictional community of Woodbridge, New York. On the first episode, her mother was injured in an automobile accident and died. This sent her father and her older brother and sister, Jerry Ames and Susan Ames Dunbar into grief. The oldest daughter, Susan, became the mother figure, and tended to be very bossy; Jerry went after the driver who caused his mother's death and tried to kill him, but was sent to reform school for this. Amy became worried and everyone was working overtime to make sure her needs were met, because of her young age. During her father's short-lived marriage to Myra Lake (who was one of her teachers), she considered her a mother figure.

Her first marriage was to Kip Rysdale, the son of Arthur Rysdale who had married her aunt Pauline Rysdale. Kip had been with a girl named Nina DeFrancisco, the daughter of his Spanish instructor. When she died, the road opened for them to marry. Then she discovered that she was pregnant by her college professor, Paul Britton. She divorced Kip and married Paul, and from this union, they had a daughter, Lisa. Kip eventually went out with a nasty woman named Janet Hill (Bibi Besch), who had become Amy's stepsister, due to her mother, Valerie marrying Peter, Amy's father. In a classic episode from the mid-sixties, Amy and Janet squared off over Kip.

Meanwhile, Amy had been on a boat with Belle Clemmens' illegitimate daughter, Robin, when there was an accident. Robin drowned, and Belle, totally furious, intended to make Amy's life miserable, which she did with great glee.

Belle stole Paul Britton from Amy, which sent her into a nervous breakdown. She had been helped by a Dr. Ian Northcote, who had married her stepmother, Valerie Hill Ames. She met a man named Kevin Kincaid, and later on, married him. Conniving Belle had married his father, Dan, after using Paul and throwing him away.

After Kevin was paralyzed from the waist down from a fight with a mobster, Amy was artificially inseminated by a Dr. Brian Neeves. (Brian, in love with Amy, had used his own semen without at first telling her.) A nurse named Martha Ann Ashley (Audre Johnson), who was a cohort of Belle's told her what was going on, and Belle used this as a blackmailing tactic against Amy to keep her lover stocked in racing cars. However, this backfired in Belle's face when her lover, Robert Landers, began to see her former ward, Joanna Morrison.

Amy gave birth to Danielle (her child that was artificially inseminated) and found out that Kevin had returned to Woodbridge. He had gone to London for surgery, which was successful, and was in the middle of the living room in Valerie's house. He attempted to walk to Amy, but missed the mark by a few inches, he fell to the floor. Amy fell to the floor as well, joined by her daughters Lisa and Danielle. Valerie came into the room and saw the love that her stepdaughter had for her husband, and they never parted again.

=== Ellen Ames ===
Ellen Ames (née Tyrell) was played by Ellen Cobb-Hill.

Ellen, the youngest daughter of Judge J.T. Tyrell and Grace Tyrell, was also the younger sister of Pauline Rysdale, and was married to her sister's ex-fiancé, Peter Ames. Peter and Ellen eloped, to the shock of Pauline, who had always loved him. From this union came three children: Susan Ames Dunbar, the oldest, Jerry Ames, the sole son, and Amy Ames, the youngest. In the first episode of series Ellen was involved in a car accident and was taken to Woodbridge Hospital in Woodbridge, New York. She died of her injuries, and the family spiraled out of control.

Jerry was furious and was intent exacting revenge on the drunk driver who took his mother's life. He beat him violently and Jerry wound up in reform school. Susan took over as the mother figure of the family, and became quite bossy.

=== Peter Ames ===
Peter Ames was the lead male character. Although played by other actors, Peter Hobbs was the actor most identified in the role.

Peter was the father of three children who had suddenly lost his wife, Ellen, in a car crash. She died of her injuries at Woodbridge (New York) Hospital. He tried his hardest to be both mother and father to his three children. His oldest, Susan Ames Dunbar, became the mother figure, and also became somewhat bossy; his son, Jerry was so angry with the driver who took his mother's life that he nearly killed him, and landed in reform school. Amy, the youngest, was worried, and was the focus, as everyone tried to make sure she was all right.

He had always been loved by Pauline Rysdale, his former sister-in-law, whom he had been engaged to before eventually eloping with Ellen. Pauline and Susan worked overtime to deflect the attention of any women who were interested in Peter. He did remarry a woman named Myra Lake (June Graham), who was one of Amy's teachers, but the marriage dissolved because the two families didn't like each other, although Amy considered her a mother figure.

His third and most successful marriage was with widow Valerie Hill Ames. They were happy for quite a number of years until he succumbed to a heart attack while he was on a business trip.

=== Valerie Hill Ames ===
Valerie Northcote was played from 1961 until the show's end in 1974, by the actress Lori March.

Valerie was the divorced woman who became the third wife of widower Peter Ames. Although her daughter, Janet Hill Porter (Bibi Besch) disapproved of her mother remarrying, she eventually was forced to accept him. However, Janet still caused a lot of problems for the family. Valerie married Peter and for several years, was the shelter for the Ames family. She and Peter were happy for several years until a heart attack while on a business trip, killed Peter. Valerie grieved for a respectful amount of time, until she met a psychiatrist who was treating her stepdaughter, Amy Ames. His name was Dr. Ian Northcote (who was first played by Gordon Rigsby, and then by Lori March's real-life husband, Alexander Scourby).

Despite her remarriage, she stayed in the Ames family's lives, notably Amy, who looked to Valerie as a mother figure, up until the show's end.

=== Belle Clemens ===
Belle Clemens was played from 1968 to 1974 by the actress Marla Adams.

Belle and her daughter were first befriended by the Ames family. Belle was estranged from her father, newspaper editor Charlie Clemons, and her sister.

Beautiful but vindictive Belle had lost her illegitimate daughter Robin, in a boating accident and blamed Amy, her former friend, for it. She simply enjoyed making life miserable for Amy, and proved to be good at it.

She stole Amy's second husband, Paul Britton, driving Amy into a nervous breakdown. The character of Dr. Ian Northcote and his family were introduced when Amy had her mental problems. Belle's life was later complicated when a former flame R. B. Keefer (played by Troy Donahue) came to Woodbridge and was later murdered, a crime for which Belle Britton would be arrested, tried, and later cleared.

After using Paul and then throwing him away, she married a man named Dan Kincaid (played by Bernard Barrow) who she thought would become the state's next governor, but he lost. In a forced kinship, Amy married Dan's son, Kevin, making them in-laws, but they still hated each other, and would do so until the end of the show. Belle, while married to Dan, was having an affair with his illegitimate son Robert Landers (Dan Hamiliton), a racecar driver.

When Amy was artificially inseminated by Dr. Brian Neeves, Belle found out about it from a nurse named Martha Ann Ashley (Audre Johnson), who was one of her cohorts. He used this information to extract blackmail money from Amy to keep her new lover full of racing cars.

At the show's end, she left her husband, Dan, and, keeping true to her selfish nature, and having made Amy's life completely miserable, went on to a glamorous singing career.

Belle's full name was Belle Clemens Britton Kincaid.

=== Susan Ames Dunbar ===
Susan was the eldest daughter of Peter Ames and his wife, Ellen. After her mother's death in a car accident, she became the new mother figure in the family. She was usually responsible for the well being of her younger siblings, Jerry Ames, and her youngest sister, Amy. She also resented any plans of her father to remarry, a situation shared by her maternal aunt, Pauline Rysdale. Despite all her plans, though, he did eventually remarry, first to Myra Lake, whom she outright despised, and then to Valerie, whom she somewhat got along with.

At some times, Susan had a lot of anger and animosity towards her father and his constant belief of principles, especially during his marriage to Myra. She had a tendency to back people of very little or no principle and their causes, such as businessman Frank Bennett, whom her husband had worked for, but resigned from his job, due to his unethical means (he had been involved in a school land swindle that Peter was trying to stop) as well as backing her Aunt Pauline's divorce and backing an embezzler named Bryan Fuller, who was also enamored of Aunt Pauline.

She was married to a man named Alan Dunbar, (James Vickery) a former golf pro. Alan Dunbar was first involved with Lucy Stokes, (Joyce Barker). Alan was involved in a drug ring, but slowly broke away from that life, and married Susan. She also had his son named Peter, named after her father, Peter. Susan and Alan were happy, despite some storms, especially dealing with his fellow newspaper reporter Ann Wicker, who was seducing Alan. He almost succumbed to temptation, but still remained a good husband, until he was presumed dead in Vietnam.

Thinking that he was dead, Susan married a man named Frank Carver. Alan, now played by Liam Sullivan, turned up alive, and his war experiences made him psychotic. He also re-established his Mafia connections by joining a drug ring headed by Dan Kincaid. Alan was later murdered and Susan was prosecuted for his murder by District Attorney Ursula Winthrop (Jacqueline Brookes), who bore a grudge against the Ames family.

Susan Ames Dunbar Carver was played by several different actresses. Jean Mowry originated the role in 1954 and departed in 1956, going on to play Pat Cunningham on As the World Turns from 1957 to 1959 until retiring from acting to marry. Rachel Taylor then took on the role until 1957. The actress Tori Darnay temporarily played Susan. Norma Moore stepped into the role from 1957, then was replaced by Mary Foskett in 1958 who successfully carried on Susan's role until 1964 when Frances Helm took on the role for a few months before she was replaced in 1965 by Judy Lewis. Lewis left the show and Diana Van der Vlis temporarily replaced her. Van der Vlis was replaced by Mary McGregor who was in turn replaced by Lewis when she returned to the show in 1969 and played the role until January 1972.

=== Pauline Rysdale ===
Pauline Rysdale, (née Tyrell, previously Harris) known more familiarly as "Aunt Pauline", was played by the actress Haila Stoddard.

Pauline was the daughter of Judge J.T. and Grace Tyrell, who owned Tyrell's Department Store. The Tyrell family was one of the oldest and richest families in town. She and Peter Ames were engaged to be married, but was shocked to discover that he eloped with her younger sister, Ellen Ames. One day later, Ellen was in a car accident and was killed. She helped her grieving brother in-law, and his three children, but she had some ulterior motives. She was still in love with Peter and was angling to still marry him.

After several affairs, Pauline eventually married a man named Arthur Rysdale. She was interested in nearly destroying any relationship that Peter would have. He was intent on marrying Jane Edwards, the recently hired housekeeper, but Pauline found Jane's presumably dead husband, Bruce, and the two reconciled. With her own marriage to Arthur Rysdale, she was not always causing any more trouble. Arthur's son, Kip, eventually married, then divorced Pauline's niece, Amy Ames.

During the battle with Jane, Pauline had help from her oldest niece, Susan Ames Dunbar. She was as against her father remarrying as Aunt Pauline was.

However, by the 1970s, Aunt Pauline had mellowed a great deal and was not as malevolent as in the 1950s. She had been relegated to the background, but it was presumed that she was still living in Woodbridge.

== Partial cast ==
Performer	Role	Duration
David Ackroyd	Kevin Kincaid	
Ellen Barber	Joanna Morrison	
Bernard Barrow	Dan Kincaid	
Stepahnie Braxton	Laurie Stevens Reddin	
David Gale	Mark Reddin	
June Graham	Myra Lake Ames	
Jamie Grover	Clay Stevens	
Dan Hamilton	Robert Landers	
Eleanor Phelps	Grace Tyrell	
Judy Safran	Lisa Britton	
Gary Sandy	Stace Reddin	
Alexander Scourby	Ian Northcoat	
Bruce Sherwood	Doug Winthorp	
Wayne Tippit	Jerry Ames	
James Vickery	Alan Dunbar	
Margaret Barker	Grace Harris Tyrel	

== Production ==
=== Executive producers ===
Duration	Name
February 1, 1954 – June 20, 1969	Roy Winsor
June 23, 1969 – February 18, 1972	Woody Klose
February 21, 1972 – December 21, 1973	Bernie Sofronski
December 24, 1973 – February 8, 1974	Charles Weiss

=== Head writers ===
Name
Roy Winsor
Jane and Ira Avery
Lou Scofield
Gillian Houghton
Bethel Leslie and Gerry Day
Robert Cenedella
Frances Rickett
