= Evil (2003 film) =

2003 Swedish drama film

- Region 1 DVD cover
- Directed by: Mikael Håfström
- Screenplay by: Hans Gunnarsson; Mikael Håfström
- Based on: Evil by Jan Guillou
- Produced by: Ingemar Leijonborg; Hans Lönnerheden
- Starring: Andreas Wilson; Henrik Lundström; Gustaf Skarsgård
- Cinematography: Peter Mokrosinski
- Edited by: Darek Hodor
- Music by: Francis Shaw
- Production company: Moviola
- Distributed by: Columbia TriStar Films AB
- Release dates: 16 May 2003 (Cannes); 26 September 2003 (Sweden)
- Running time: 113 minutes
- Country: Sweden
- Language: Swedish
- Budget: $3 million
- Box office: $12.4 million

Evil (Swedish: Ondskan) is a 2003 Swedish teen drama film which was released to cinemas in Sweden on 26 September 2003, directed by Mikael Håfström, based on Jan Guillou's semi-autobiographical novel of the same title from 1981, and starring Andreas Wilson, Henrik Lundström and Gustaf Skarsgård. The film is set in a private boarding school in the late 1950s with institutional violence as its theme.

The film was nominated for the Academy Award for Best Foreign Language Film at the 76th Academy Awards. It won three Swedish Guldbagge Awards including Best Film.

== Plot ==
In 1958 Stockholm, 15-year-old Erik Ponti suffers daily beatings from his sadistic stepfather while his mother, too afraid to intervene, plays piano to drown out the noise. At school, Erik's violent behavior leads to expulsion, with the headmaster branding him as evil. To give him a fresh start, Erik's mother sells family heirlooms to send him to Stjärnsberg, an upscale boarding school.

Upon arrival, Erik sees the boarding school as his last shot at reaching sixth form and tries to suppress his violent tendencies. At the prestigious school, a group of twelve sixth formers forms a Student Council, exerting sadistic control and subjecting disobedient students to physical and psychological punishment. The staff turn a blind eye, allowing the students to "self-govern". When Erik stands up to Council members Silverhielm and Dahlén, he becomes their target, enduring relentless bullying for refusing to comply with their humiliating demands. Erik finds solace in his intellectual roommate Pierre, who avoids attention to evade bullying.

In the school kitchens one weekend, Erik meets Marja, a Finnish cafeteria staff member, after a tough day of work. They start a romance as Marja admires Erik's resilience. Meanwhile, Erik joins the swimming team and faces a dilemma: to win, he must defeat the school champion, son of a major donor. Despite knowing the consequences, his coach encourages him to uphold honor. Erik triumphs, setting records and earning sarcastic applause from jealous sixth formers.

During Christmas break, Erik faces another brutal beating from his stepfather, while his mother plays the piano to drown out the noise. Back at school, the Student Council targets Pierre, who refuses to defend himself. Unable to bear his friend's humiliation, Erik quits the swim team in an attempt to protect him, but it's not enough. Later, Erik volunteers to endure punishment in Pierre's place, showing unwavering bravery. The next day, Pierre faces the councilmen in a fight and refuses to comply with their demands despite severe beating.

The next day, Erik is ambushed on his way back from detention. He's tied down, scalded with boiling water, doused in cold water, and left to freeze, but Marja rescues him. They spend the night together. Returning to his room, Erik discovers Pierre has left. Feeling bitter and rebellious, Erik challenges Dahlén and von Schenken to a fight, easily defeating them. He then seeks out Marja, only to find she's returned to Finland after being fired. When the headmaster discovers a love letter from Marja to Erik, intercepted by Silverhielm, Erik is expelled for their alleged relationship. Furious, Erik confronts Silverhielm in the woods, threatening revenge.

As Silverhielm pleads for his life, hysterical and vomiting, Erik resists his violent impulses, refusing to stoop to Silverhielm's level. He returns to school with Mr. Ekengren, a family friend who's a lawyer. Ekengren confronts the headmaster, highlighting the school's breach of Sweden's secrecy laws by intercepting Marja's letter. Threatening to expose the culture of negligence among staff, Erik is reinstated, receives Marja's letter, and completes his final semester in peace.

As the school year ends, Erik returns home to find his mother beaten by his stepfather. When his stepfather attempts to harm him again, Erik stands up to him, declaring it's over. He assures his shocked mother that violence ends now, then closes the door, preparing to confront his stepfather off-screen. With his stepfather finally gone, Erik reconciles with Pierre, who's leaving for Geneva. Determined to build a better future, Erik plans to reach out to Marja, aspiring to start a family and pursue his dream of becoming a lawyer.

== Cast ==
- Andreas Wilson as Erik Ponti
- Henrik Lundström as Pierre Tanguy
- Gustaf Skarsgård as Otto Silverhielm
- Linda Zilliacus as Marja
- Jesper Salén as Gustaf Dalén
- Peter Eggers as Karl von Rosen
- Filip Berg as Johan
- Marie Richardson as Erik's mother
- Johan Rabaeus as Erik's stepfather
- Magnus Roosmann as Tosse Berg, gymnastic teacher
- Ulf Friberg as Tranströmer, biology teacher
- Lennart Hjulström as Lindblad, headmaster of Stjärnsberg
- Mats Bergman as Melander, history teacher
- Kjell Bergqvist as Gunnar Ekengren, lawyer
- Björn Granath as headmaster
- Fredrik af Trampe as von Schenken
- Petter Darin as von Seth

== Production ==
Originally conceived as a television series, director Mikael Håfström felt unready for an extensive production and instead waited until he could convince the producers to make it into a feature film. Håfström included Hans Gunnarsson as a co-writer, and financing went ahead quickly. The budget was 20 million Swedish kronor.

The casting of the supporting actors proceeded without any significant difficulties, but despite auditions for over 120 applicants, a lead actor had still not been found when only two weeks remained before filming was intended to begin. Finally the director recalled Andreas Wilson, a young male model with very limited acting experience whom he had previously met briefly at a birthday party. Håfström contacted people he knew had been at the party to get Wilson's phone number, after which he called him and asked him to come over. Håfström was immediately sure that he had found the right person, and after a few physical tests, Wilson was given the role. Before filming started Wilson had swimming training to learn how to crawl the way swimmers did in the 1950s.

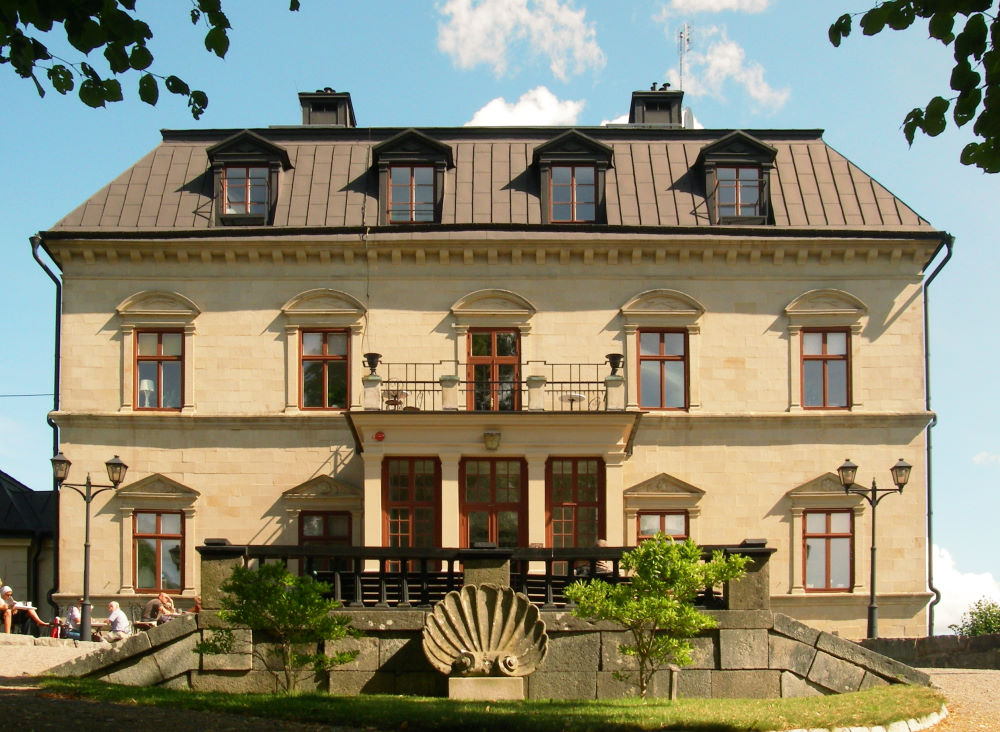
Görvälns Castle north of Stockholm served as the school building's exterior.

Filming took 30 days to finish, from early October to November 2002. The school Stjärnsberg in the film is based on Solbacka boarding school, a real school attended by the author of the novel. The school was closed in 1973. The original building of Solbacka still exists as a recreation centre for golfers, but had been renovated to such a degree that the director felt it could not be used as a believable filming location. Instead most exterior shots were made around Görvälns slott in Jakobsberg, north of Stockholm. The dining area in the film was built in a studio as a replica of the original school's dining hall, based on photographs from the time. The pool scenes were shot at the school Gubbängsskolan in southern Stockholm.

Songs heard in the film includes "Stupid Cupid" by Neil Sedaka, "The Great Pretender" by The Platters, "Weisser Halunder" by Inger Berggren, and "Peggy Sue" by Buddy Holly & The Crickets.

== Release ==
The film was first shown for potential buyers at the 2003 Cannes Film Festival's Marché du Film. The first public screening was at the Toronto International Film Festival in September the same year. The Swedish premiere followed on 26 September. Evil became a huge commercial success in Sweden with 959,223 admissions in total. On 24 June 2005, it was released in the United Kingdom, and on 10 March 2006 as a limited release in the United States.

== Reception ==
=== Critical response ===
Evil has an approval rating of 68% on review aggregator website Rotten Tomatoes, based on 38 reviews, and an average rating of 6.5/10. The website's critical consensus states, "Evil's attempts to unpack the causes and effects of violence aren't always successful, but the well-acted end result still has an unsettling impact. Metacritic assigned the film a weighted average score of 61 out of 100, based on 15 critics, indicating "generally favorable reviews".

=== Accolades ===
The film was Sweden's submission for the Academy Award for Best Foreign Language Film at the 76th Academy Awards. On 27 January 2004, it was announced that it had been selected as one of the five nominees. Jan Guillou was unable to attend the Awards, since he did not receive a ticket. At the Swedish Guldbagge Awards it was nominated in seven categories, of which it won three: Best Film, Best Cinematography and Best Production Design. The categories where it did not win were Best Direction, Best Screenplay, Andreas Wilson as Best Actor and Gustaf Skarsgård as Best Supporting Actor.

== See also ==
- Kulir 100°, 2009 Indian remake
- List of submissions to the 76th Academy Awards for Best Foreign Language Film
- List of Swedish submissions for the Academy Award for Best Foreign Language Film
