= August 15th (2008 film) =

- Directed by: Jiang Xuan
- Written by: Jiang Xuan
- Produced by: Gareth Chang
- Starring: Bian Tao; Zhao Xinxi; Cai Lu; Qu Shaoshi
- Cinematography: Duan Haifeng
- Edited by: Esteban Arguello
- Release date: January 2008 (Sundance Film Festival)
- Running time: 20 minutes
- Country: China

August 15th (Ba yue shi wu) is a 2008 short Chinese film, directed by Jiang Xuan. It has been screened in various international film festivals, including Sundance Film Festival in January 2008, Cannes Film Festival in May 2008, and the Expresión en Corto Film Festival of Mexico in June 2008.

== Plot summary ==
Based on a true story, passengers on a city bus must decide what they are willing to sacrifice for their own safety after it is hijacked by a couple of countryside crooks. It is based on two real events, both involved women being raped, one in a train and the other in a bus, while a crowd of people stood by and did nothing to intervene. On the bus, the crooks take over and the passengers must decide how much they are willing to risk for their own safety.

== Accolades ==
The film received the Honorable Mentions in Short Filmmaking at the 2008 Sundance Film Festival. It is available for download from online sources, including iTunes Store, Netflix, and Xbox Live Marketplace. It was also screened at the International Critics' Week of the 2008 Cannes Film Festival.
