= Marilyn and Me =

- Genre: Drama
- Teleplay by: Robert Boris
- Story by: Stu Samuels; Robert Boris
- Directed by: John Patterson
- Starring: Susan Griffiths; Jesse Dabson; Terry Moore
- Music by: George Blondheim
- Country of origin: United States
- Original language: English

Production
- Executive producer: Stu Samuels
- Producers: Robert Boris; Susan Weber-Gold
- Cinematography: Dennis C. Lewiston
- Editor: Stephen Adrianson
- Running time: 100 minutes
- Production companies: Poochie Productions; Samuels Film Company

Original release
- Network: ABC
- Release: September 22, 1991

Marilyn and Me is a 1991 American television film. It premiered on the History Channel in India on May 12, 2006, in Double 'F'.

The film portrays the life of Robert Slatzer, an American writer who claimed to have married Marilyn Monroe in Mexico on 4 October 1952 (although there is no proof that this happened) and said that he met her when she was just beginning acting. Their secret affair shatters and rebuilds several times, as Marilyn is torn apart between her career and her lover.

== Cast ==
- Susan Griffiths as Marilyn Monroe
- Jesse Dabson as Robert Slatzer
- Terry Moore as Woman at Hyde's Funeral
- Sandy McPeak as Darryl F. Zanuck
- Kurt Fuller as Harry Lipton
- Michael Cavanaugh as Walter Winchell
- Joel Grey as Johnny Hyde
- Sal Landi as Joe DiMaggio
- Marla Adams as Gladys Pearl Baker
- Richard Roat as Western Director
- David Wells as Tom Kelley
