= Andreas Wilson =

Swedish actor (born 1981)

- Born: Andreas Axel Janota Wilson; 7 March 1981 (age 45); Stockholm, Sweden
- Occupation: Actor
- Years active: 2003–present
- Known for: Evil (2003)
- Spouse: Nicole Janota (m. 2010)

Andreas Axel Janota Wilson (born 7 March 1981) is a Swedish actor who played the leading role in the Oscar-nominated (for best foreign movie) Evil. He has also starred in Kill Your Darlings, Babas bilar and Den utvalde. He was named as one of European films' "Shooting Stars" by the European Film Promotion in 2004. He has been modeling for the clothing store Abercrombie & Fitch.

== Selected filmography ==
- The Veil of Twilight (2014)
- Real Humans (TV-series, 2012)
- Sebastians Verden (2010)
- Bicycle Bride (2010)
- Stone's War (2008)
- Colorado Avenue (2007)
- Kill Your Darlings (2006)
- Babas bilar (2006)
- Animal (2005)
- Den utvalde (2005)
- Evil (2003)
