= Hans Gunnarsson =

Swedish writer (born 1966)

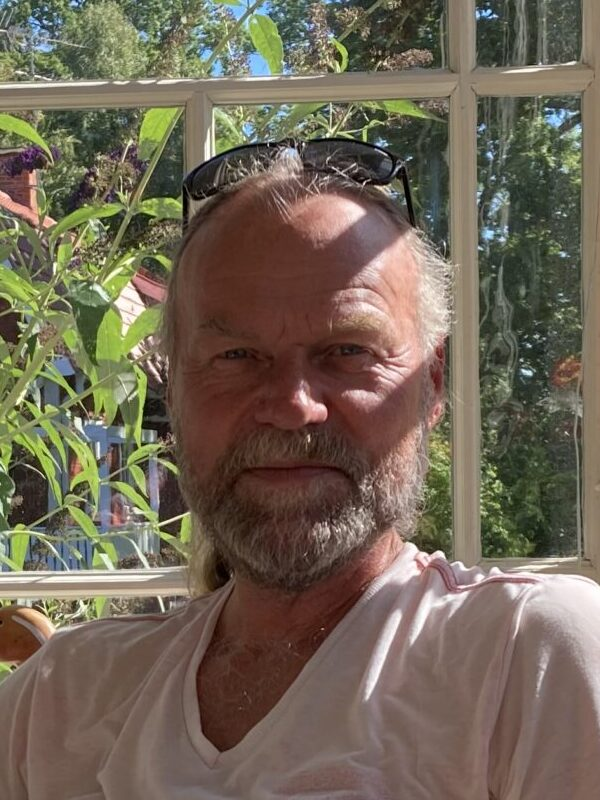
Hans Gunnarsson in 2022.

Hans Gunnarsson (born 1966) is a Swedish novelist, short story writer and screenwriter.

== Literary career ==
Gunnarsson published his first book, the short story collection Bakom glas in 1996 for which he was awarded the Katapultpriset for that year's best literary debut. It was followed by Februari: två berättelser in 1999 which established him as one of Sweden's most celebrated short story writers.

In 2003 he published his first novel En jävla vinter. His third novel Någon annanstans i Sverige (2007) was made into a film by Kjell-Åke Andersson. The acclaimed novel All inclusive (2015) was a major breakthrough and was followed by the psychological thriller Rum för resande in 2016. The novel Nattsida, relating to All inclusive, was published in 2019. In 2021 he returned as a short story writer with the critically acclaimed Bormann i Bromma, for which he was awarded the Aniarapriset. Död mans skugga (2023) completed a trilogy of related novels also including All inclusive and Nattsida, that by some critics was described as the Swedish equivalent of Paul Auster's The New York Trilogy.

== Writing style ==
Gunnarsson's realistic novels and stories has been noted for depicting everyday life with tragicomedy and the absurd. Human shortcomings is a recurring theme in his writing. Noir fiction is an influence on recent novels such as Nattsida and Död mans skugga.

== Film work ==
The 2001 film Days Like This is based on Gunnarsson's short story Februari. The screenplay, written by Gunnarsson in collaboration with the film's director Mikael Håfström, won them a Guldbagge for best screenplay in 2002. His screenwriting also include the Academy Award for Best International Feature Film-nominated Evil (2003), Arn: The Knight Templar (2007) and The King of Ping Pong (2008).

== Bibliography ==
- Bakom glas 1996
- Februari: två berättelser 1999
- En kväll som den här 2001
- En jävla vinter 2003
- Allt ligger samlat 2005
- Någon annanstans i Sverige 2007
- Albatross 2009
- Försmådd 2012
- All inclusive 2015
- Rum för resande 2016
- Nattsida 2019
- Bormann i Bromma 2021
- Död mans skugga 2023
- Den smala lyckan 2025

== Awards ==
- Katapultpriset 1997, for Bakom glas
- Guldbagge for best screenplay 2002, for Days Like This
- Aniarapriset 2022, for Bormann i Bromma
