= Uppland Runic Inscription 92 =

Coordinates: 59°25′32.48″N 17°49′45.98″E

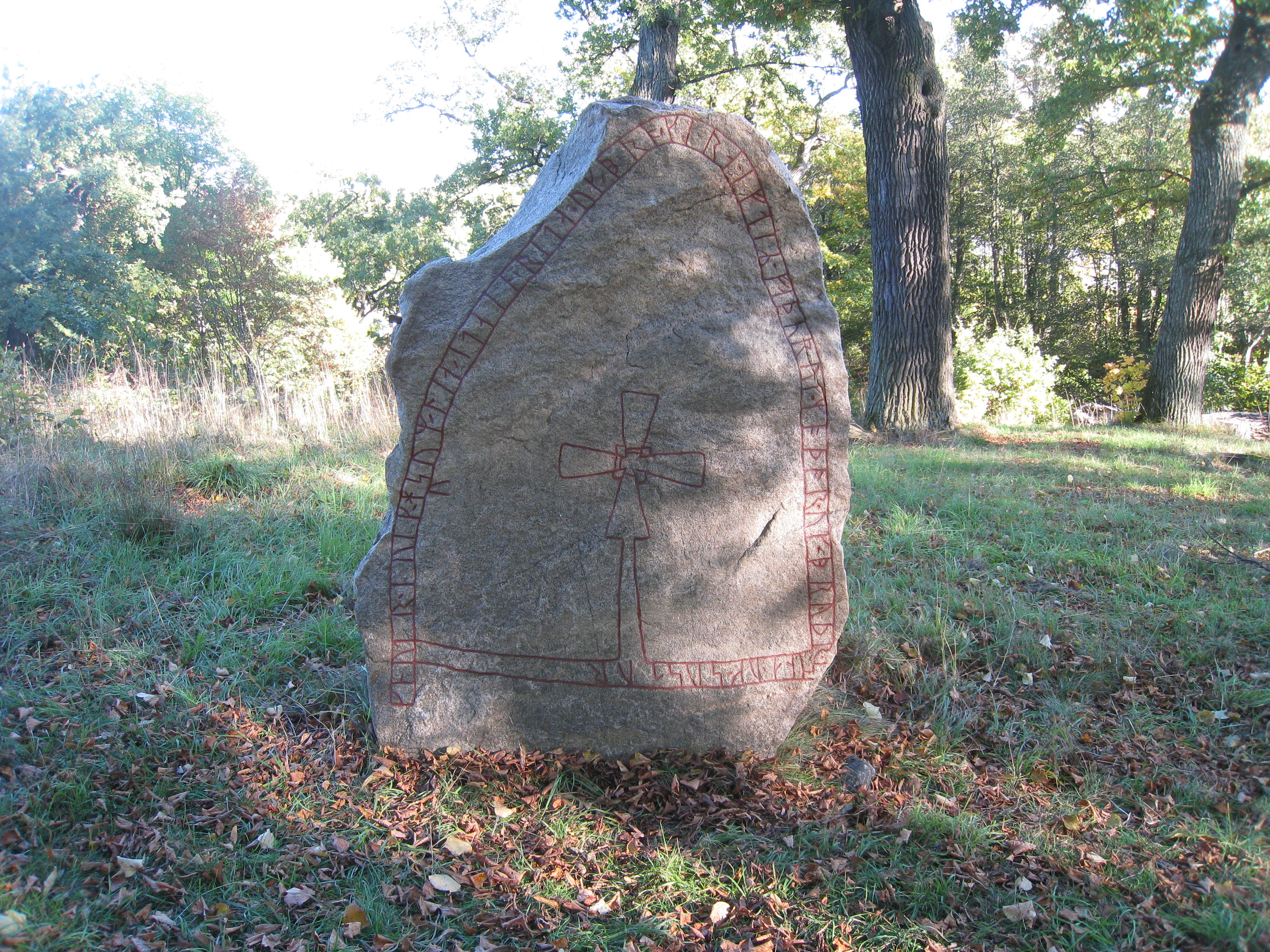
- Created: 11th Century
- Discovered: Jakobsberg, Uppland, Sweden
- Rundata ID: U 92

Text – Native
- Old Norse : See article.

Translation
- See article.

Uppland Runic Inscription 92 is carved on a rune that now stands in the park at Jakobsberg folk highschool (Jakobsbergs folkhögskola) in Jakobsberg, in Järfälla Municipality just north of Stockholm. The rock is lightgrey granite.

== U92 ==
In the park at Jakobsbergs folkhögskola there are two rune set. Both rune stones have been moved from their original location in the late period, but has previously been on Jakobsberg's properties or, as it was previously called, Vibble farm lands. The second rune stone, which stands in the park at Jacob's college, the U91, Uppland Runic Inscription 91. The inscription mentions that Gunnvar and Kättilfrid erected stone. Holmstein and Holme traveled stone after the frost ...

== Description ==
The name Viksjö is the oldest known writing coated, place name in Järfälla. On a rune, which now stands in the park at Jakobsberg's folk highschool, it is written that "Knut in Vikhusum (Viksjö) did raise up the stone and make the bridge after his father and mother and his brothers and (his) sister”. It got its present location in the park in 1920. The stone has the designation U92, Upplands inscriptions 92. The inscription on the stone at Jakobsberg's folk highschool reveals that Vikhusum , which is the older term for Viksjö, was inhabited as early as during the Viking Age. The rune stone is very simple without a shred of the animal ornamentation that is otherwise so common in the Uppland rune stones. Already in the 1700s this runestone was moved from its original location in the Vibble Järfälla parish. Vibble is the name of a number of a now long-lost buildings, on whose land Jakobsberg's Manor later were built. The farm place was situated on the west side of Kvarnbacken and approximately at the place where Kvarnskolan now stands. Vibble was first mentioned in 1347, but the farm has undoubtedly been established during the Late Iron Age. On Vibble's estate was originally the two rune stones U91 and U92, which today is in the park to Jakobsberg's folk highschool.

In the 1600s the runestone was moved together with U 91 (Uppland Runic Inscription 91) in Wibbla Giärde. Both of whose traditional name is Viblestenarna has probably worked as breast unite in a stream. The stones are then moved several times and U 92 included the gatepost. It received its present location in the park at Jakobsberg's folk highschool in the 1920th. The last time the stone was painted was in September 2012 by the National Heritage.

== Inscription ==
=== Inscription ===
ᚴᚾᚢᛏᚱ ' ᛁ ᚢᛁᚴ'ᚼᚢᛋᚢᛘ ' ᛚᛁᛏ ' ᛋᛏᛅᛁᚾ ' ᚱᛁᛏᛅ ' ᚢᚴ ' ᛒᚱᚬ ' ᚴᛁᚱᛅ ᛫ ᛁᚡᛏᛁᛦ ' ᚡᛅᚦᚢᚱ ᚢᚴ ᛫ ᛘᚬᚦᚬᚱ ᛫ ᚢᚴ ᛫ ᛒᚱᚤᚦᚱ ᛫ ᛋᛁᚾᛅ ᛫ ᚢᚴ ᛫ ᛋᚢᛋᛏᚢᚱ

=== Transliteration of runic text into Latin letters ===
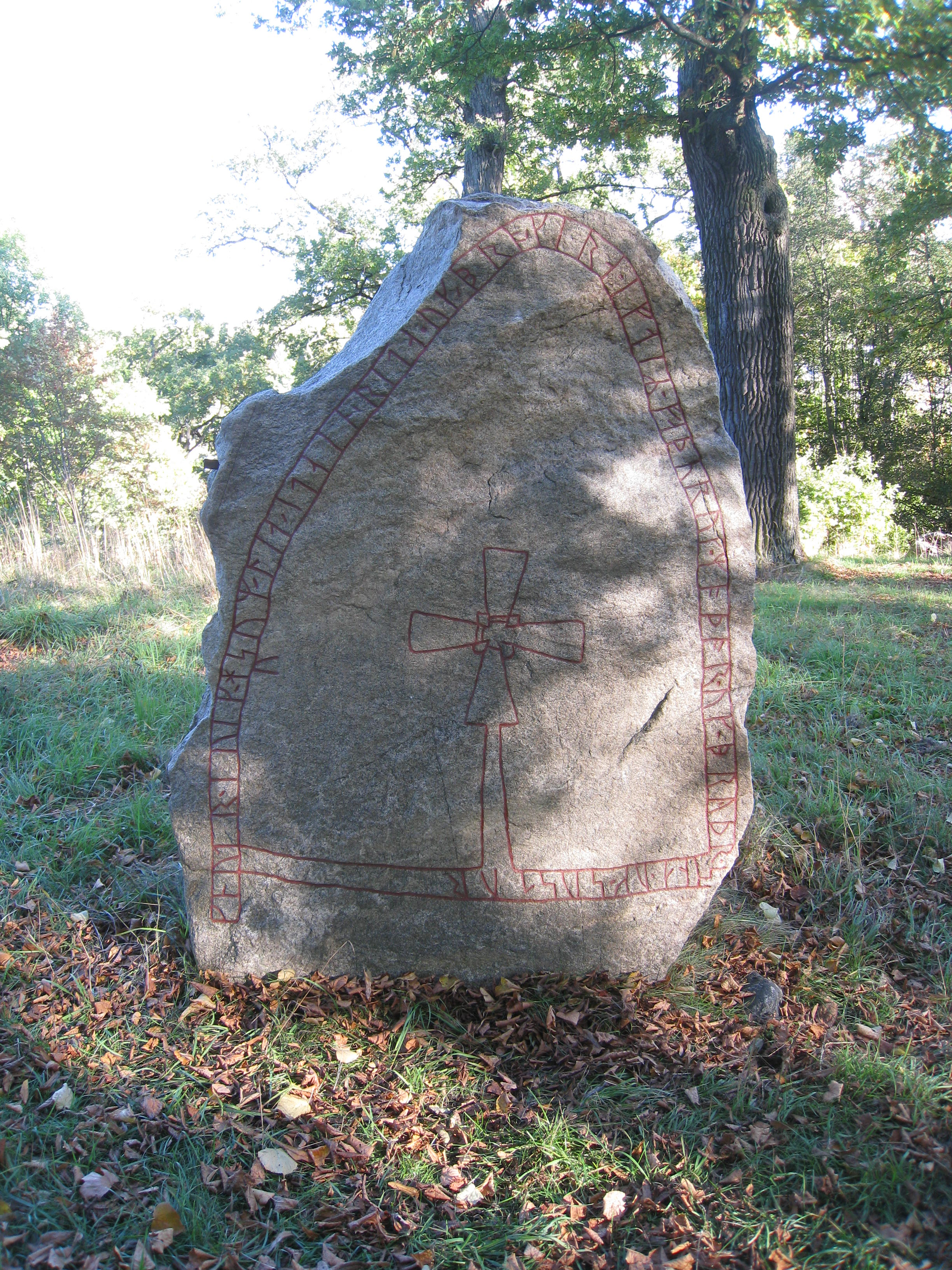
The runestone U92, Uppland Runic Inscription 92.

Rune Swedish

knutr ' i uik'husum ' lit ' stain ' rita ' uk ' bro ' kira * iftiʀ ' faþur uk * moþor * uk * bryþr * sina * uk * sustur

Rune Swedish, normalised

Knutr i Vikhusum let stæin retta ok bro gæra æftiʀ faður ok moður ok brøðr sina ok systur.

Present-day Swedish

Knut i Viksjö lät uppresa stenen och göra bron efter fader och moder och sina bröder och (sin) syster.

English translation

Knut in Viksjö erected the stone and make the bridge after his father and mother and his brothers and (his) sister.

== Older archaeological researcher in Järfälla ==
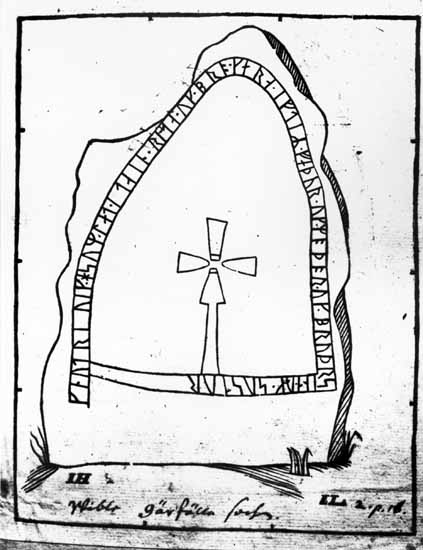
17th century drawing by the Swedish archaeological researcher Johan Hadorph (1630-1693) and the draughtsman and land surveyor Johan Leitz (died 1738) in 1682.

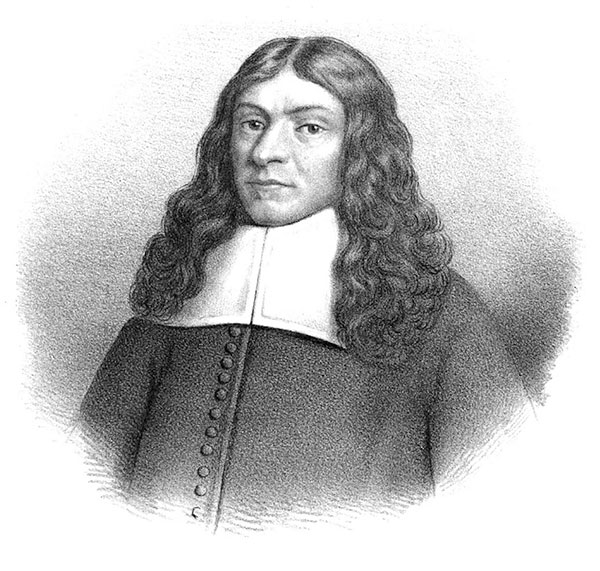
Johan Hadorph (1630-1693), lithograph from 1849.

The archaeological researcher Johan Hadorph (1630-1793) was the driving force in College of Antiquaries (Swedish: Antikvitetskollegiet) in Uppsala. Moreover, Johan Hadorph was the college's secretary. He was also the initiator of the, a kind of archaeological inventory, where priests and the sheriff was asked to submit reports on the relics that were found in the different parts of the country. He was also the "first Swedish archaeologist," according to Name Board (NB) and he undertook in the 1680s the first scientific study of Björkö in Ekerö Municipality, known as Birka. On Hadorph's initiative the Searching for Antiquity was carried out during the years 1667-1693. These reports formed the basis for Hadorphs antiquarian trips. Parishes that were ransacked were Bromma, Spånga and Järfälla Municipality in Gierfella d. 9 Maij 1682 by the County Administrator Bertold Dalhollm. In Dalhollms list there is mentioned six inscriptions of Järfälla and also an otherwise unknown rune stone at Yttersten. The six runic inscriptions mentioned are U86, U88, U89, U90, U91 and U92. The Searching for Antiquity is kept in the National Library of Sweden in Stockholm, but is also published in print form. The College of Antiquaries in Uppsala was founded in 1667 on the initiative of Magnus Gabriel De la Gardie. Several of scholars of that time were attached to the college. These included Georg Stiernhielm, Johan Axehiälm, Olaus Verelius, Johannes Loccenius, Johannes Schefferus and Magnus Celsius. To the tasks of the college was to develop a Swedish Dictionary, to publish Icelandic sagas and Swedish medieval laws. To the college's duties also heard to depict rune stones, coins and seals and to carrying out archaeological investigations.

In the summer of 1682 Johan Hadorph travelled together with the draughtsman Johan Leitz through Järfälla and mapped all the inscriptions that had been mentioned in Searching for Antiquity with the exception of the rune stone at the front way, that probably never existed. Hadorph additionally discovered a previously unknown rune at Järfälla church (U82). Johan Hadorph's Travelling Journal or Scribbling pad Notes from 1682 has been preserved and is now in the National Library of Sweden (Swedish: Kungliga biblioteket, KB, meaning "the Royal Library"). Among Järfälla runic inscriptions, however, Hadorph here only listed one of the rune stones at Skälby (U89). From the drawings of Hadorph's trips there were made woodcuts. These woodcuts should be part of a work with all of the country's rune stones. Hadorph could issue only a small part of this planned work of the rune stones (Färentuna Häradz Runstenar, 1680).

== See also ==
- Jarlabanke Runestones
- List of runestones
