= The Intruder (1962 film) =

1962 American film directed by Roger Corman

- American film poster, bearing the re-release title of Shame
- Directed by: Roger Corman
- Screenplay by: Charles Beaumont
- Based on: The Intruder; 1959 novel by Charles Beaumont
- Produced by: Roger Corman
- Starring: William Shatner; Frank Maxwell; Jeanne Cooper; Beverly Lunsford; Robert Emhardt; Charles Beaumont
- Cinematography: Taylor Byars
- Edited by: Ronald Sinclair
- Music by: Herman Stein
- Production company: Los Altos Productions
- Distributed by: Pathé-America Distribution Company; Cinema Distributors of America
- Release date: May 16, 1962 (New York City)
- Running time: 84 minutes
- Country: United States
- Language: English
- Budget: $90,000-100,000

The Intruder, also known as I Hate Your Guts, Shame and The Stranger (British title), is a 1962 American drama film directed and coproduced by Roger Corman and starring William Shatner. The story, adapted by Charles Beaumont from his own 1959 novel of the same title, depicts the actions of a demagogue who incites White citizens to racial violence against Blacks in reaction to court-ordered school integration.

== Plot ==
In the early 1960s, Adam Cramer arrives in the small Southern town of Caxton. The town's exclusively White high school is about to undergo forced desegregation and admit Black students following a court order, and Cramer, working on behalf of an organization called the Patrick Henry Society, wishes to incite the White townspeople to forcefully resist the desegregation. Although Cramer is not a Southerner, he charms most of the people whom he meets with his confident and genial manner. He convinces wealthy landowner Verne Shipman to back him and seduces Ella, the teenage daughter of newspaper editor Tom McDaniel.

The White locals oppose the court order but seem prepared to accept it. However, after Cramer delivers an inflammatory speech and organizes a cross burning in the Black neighborhood, some of the Whites are moved to violence, first threatening a Black family in their car and then bombing the local Black church, killing the preacher. After the church bombing, Cramer is jailed, but the locals join forces to secure his quick release.

Cramer attempts to seduce and then rapes Vi, the emotionally unstable wife of abusive traveling salesman Sam Griffin, Cramer's neighbor at the hotel. Vi, blaming herself for the rape, leaves Griffin, who seeks revenge against Cramer. However, with Griffin at gunpoint, Cramer is too weak to pull the trigger, and Griffin reveals that he had removed the bullets from the gun before the confrontation. Griffin predicts that Cramer will soon lose control of the tensions that he has ignited in the town.

McDaniel sympathizes with the Black residents and feels compelled to stand with them. After the preacher is killed, the Black families hesitate to send their children back to the White high school for fear of more violence, but McDaniel encourages them and walks the students to school past the protests of other White townspeople. After the students enter the school, several townspeople severely beat McDaniel, hospitalizing him with internal injuries and the loss of an eye.

Cramer convinces Ella that she must follow his directions to save her father from the townspeople who are planning to kill him. Following Cramer's directions, Ella lures her Black classmate, Joey Greene, to a storage room and then screams and falsely accuses him of attempting to rape her. Joey denies it, and the principal believes him but also knows that most people will believe Ella. An angry mob led by Cramer and Shipman forms in front of the school. Joey, rather than escaping through the back door with the principal to reach the safety of the sheriff's office, insists on confronting the mob. Shipman beats Joey, and the mob mocks him on a playground swing, presumably intending to lynch him next. Griffin appears with Ella, who confesses that she lied at Cramer's instigation. In front of the mob, Ella apologizes to Joey and admits that Cramer had assured her that Joey would not be harmed and would only be expelled from school.

Griffin tells the crowd that they will know for the rest of their lives that they nearly killed an innocent man. Realizing that they have been manipulated by Cramer, the townspeople slowly walk away, ignoring Cramer's exhortations, until only he and Griffin are left on the playground. Griffin exhorts Cramer to catch the next bus out of town.

== Cast ==
- William Shatner as Adam Cramer
- Frank Maxwell as Tom McDaniel
- Beverly Lunsford as Ella McDaniel
- Robert Emhardt as Verne Shipman
- Leo Gordon as Sam Griffin
- Charles Barnes as Joey Greene
- Charles Beaumont as Mr. Paton
- Katherine Smith as Ruth McDaniel
- George Clayton Johnson as Phil West
- William F. Nolan as Bart Carey
- Jeanne Cooper as Vi Griffin
- Phoebe Rowe as Mrs. Lambert

The cast includes working screenwriters Charles Beaumont, George Clayton Johnson and William F. Nolan, each of whom made his only acting appearance in a feature film. Leo Gordon was also an established screenwriter, writing several novels and films, and more than 50 television scripts, while maintaining a concurrent acting career.

== Production ==
=== Development ===
In 1958, inspired by real-life events in Tennessee involving John Kasper, a Northern bigot who incited racial conflict in Clinton, Tennessee, Charles Beaumont wrote a novel titled The Intruder. Soon after the book's publication, the film rights were optioned by Seven Arts, which was unable to start the project, and Roger Corman bought the rights in 1960. He planned to produce the film with Edward Small for United Artists, but Small withdrew. Corman then envisioned the film costing $500,000 and starring Tony Randall. However, he was unable to raise enough money, with the project declined by United Artists, Allied Artists and AIP. Corman managed to raise some funds from Pathé America, with Corman and his brother Gene contributing the balance. Gene Corman later said:

We put our hearts, our souls—and what few people do—our money into this picture. Everybody asked us 'Why would you make this picture?' as if to say why try to do something you believe in when everything else is so profitable. Obviously, we did it because we wanted to, and we think it's a damn good job.

The film's budget was only $90,000.

=== Shooting ===
The film was shot in black-and-white over three and a half weeks on location in southeast Missouri. Some of the production took place in East Prairie, Charleston and Sikeston. Corman presented a diluted version of the script to the townspeople, but they generally disapproved of it and objected to the film's portrayal of racism and segregation. On the last day of filming, the National Guard, policemen and firemen were summoned to keep the peace. When the film was complete, the Cormans funded Charles Barnes' relocation to the North to ensure his safety.

In an interview in 2006, Corman explained how he filmed William Shatner's racist speech with a crowd of townspeople present:

"When we did this scene we needed a crowd, so we announced on the local radio station that we were going to shoot a meeting at the town hall. And I knew from experience that people come out to see a picture shoot, because they’re interested, but then they find out how long it takes to set up the camera between shots and so forth and then they start drifting away. So my first shots were the big reaction shots, because I knew we would have a smaller crowd later on. Bill was doing the speech, but not every single line. It wasn’t until three or four in the morning that we reversed the camera on Bill and he did his whole speech. By that time his voice had become a little bit hoarse, but I thought it actually added something to his performance".

According to Filmink, Gene Corman's contribution to the film was crucial and often overlooked.

== Release ==
Pathé released the film in New York but the box-office performance was sluggish, perhaps affected by the Flash Crash of 1962, and Pathé withdrew the film after two weeks, citing financial reasons. The Corman brothers assumed the responsibility of distributing the film themselves. As a result, the film was not seen in major American cities such as Chicago and Los Angeles.

== Reception ==
Variety's review said: “The Intruder comes to grips with a controversial issue — integration, and those who would defy the law of the land — in an adult, intelligent and arresting manner". Stanley Kauffmann of The New Republic praised it as “crisp and inquisitive”, with “a chilling veracity". Moira Walsh, in America magazine wrote: “The characters, by and large, are drawn with psychological perceptiveness". Tim Purtell, in Entertainment Weekly, found it “chillingly effective” and Tim Lucas, in Sight and Sound, called it an “incendiary breakthrough".

In a contemporary review for The New York Times, critic Bosley Crowther called The Intruder "an angry little film" and wrote:

This must be said for The Intruder: it does break fertile ground in the area of integration that has not yet been opened on the screen. And it does so with obvious good intentions and a great deal of raw, arresting power in many of its individual details and in the aspects of several characters...Roger Corman, co-producer and director, has got into it the tacky look of the main street, the obsolescent high school and the Negro quarter of a seedy Southern burg, having shot the whole film on location in an obliging Missouri town. He has caught, in one hideous little incident of a Negro family terrorized in their car by a mob of snarling hoodlums, the bestial temper of mob hysteria. And he has got in the stolid, handsome faces of many of his Negroes the lineaments of dignity and courage.

In an interview, Roger Corman said:

"The audience at that time, the early sixties, simply didn’t want to see a picture about racial integration...From that moment on I thought my films should be entertainment on the surface and I should deliver any theme or idea or concept beneath the surface."

Filmink magazine later theorized that "White American audiences ... generally prefer to confront racism either via allegory or through period pieces as opposed to stories set in the present day … This was too raw – even today, The Intruder contains the power to shock".

== See also ==
- Civil rights movement in popular culture
