= Görväln House =

Coordinates: 59°26′05″N 17°47′15″E

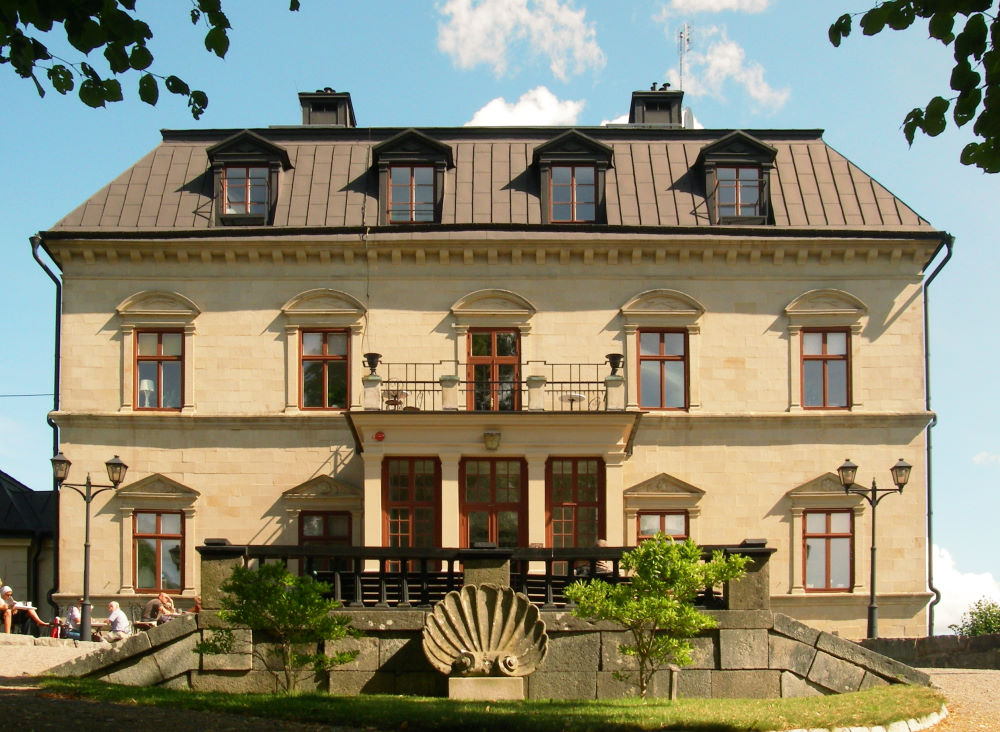

General information
- Town or city: Järfälla Municipality
- Country: Sweden
- Owner: Järfälla Municipality

Görväln House (Swedish pronunciation: [ˈjœ̂rːvɛln]; Görvälns Slott) is a manor house at Järfälla Municipality in Stockholm County, Sweden. Görväln House is located at Görväln, a bay of lake Mälaren. The manor is now owned by Järfälla Municipality and since 2008 has been used as a hotel and restaurant.

== History ==
Görväln House is documented from the 1460s, when it was two farms, owned by the Archdiocese of Uppsala. After the Protestant Reformation in 1520, Görväln became a Crown Property (kronohemman), owned by King John III of Sweden until 1571, when Johan III gave it to the Italian nobleman Antonius de Palma and his family. From 1605–61 Görvälns was owned by the Swedish noble family Bjelke. During the Bjelke era the main building was lower on the connector than presently. During Count Adolph John I's years as owner, a new main building was built. Görväln House was the location for the 2011 season of the SVT show Stjärnorna på slottet.
