= Terry Moore (actress) =

American actress (born 1929)

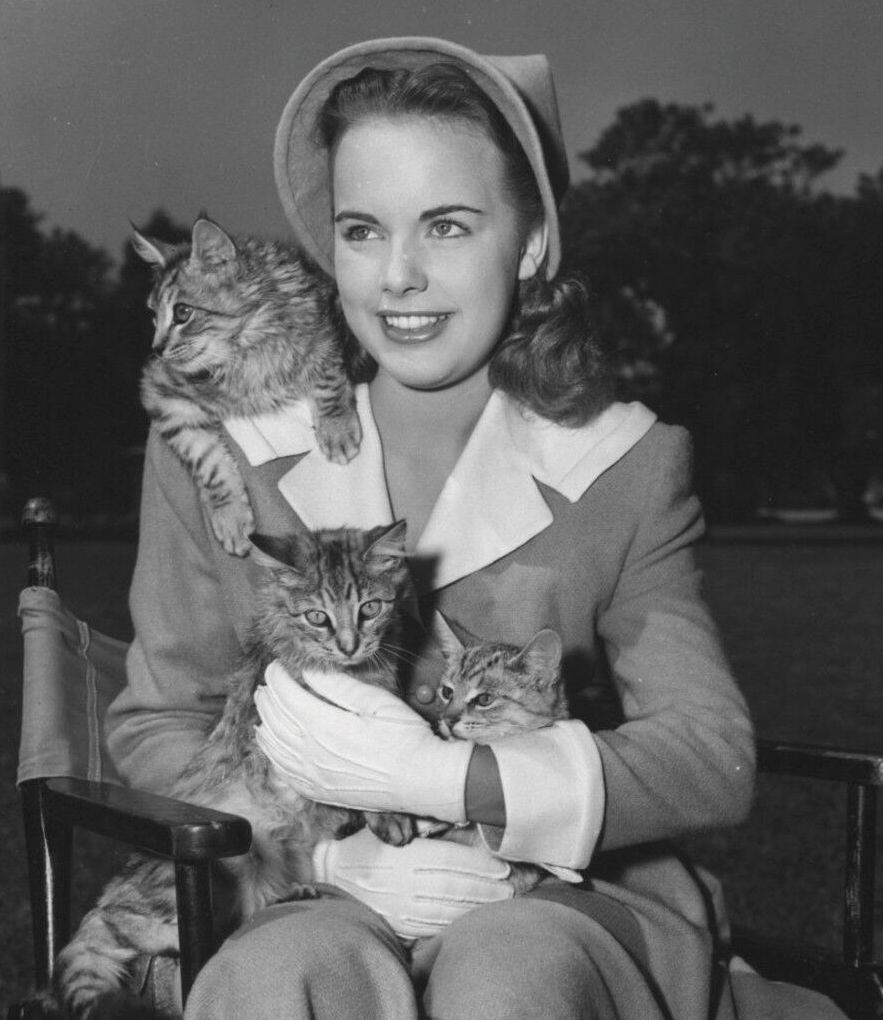
- Moore in 1947
- Born: Helen Luella Koford; January 7, 1929 (age 97); Glendale, California, U.S.
- Other names: Judy Ford; Jan Ford; January Ford
- Occupation: Actress
- Years active: 1940–present
- Known for: Come Back, Little Sheba; Mighty Joe Young; The Great Rupert
- Spouses: Glenn Davis (m. 1951; div. 1952) Eugene McGrath (m. 1956; div. 1959) Stuart Cramer (m. 1959; div. 1970) Richard Carey (m. 1979; div. 1980) Jerry Rivers (m. 1992; died 2001)
- Partner: Howard Hughes (1949–1976; disputed marriage)
- Children: 2, including Grant Cramer

Terry Moore (born Helen Luella Koford; January 7, 1929) is an American actress whose career has spanned more than eight decades. She began her career as a child performer in bit parts, notably appearing uncredited as the 14-year-old version of Ingrid Bergman's character in Gaslight (1944). After signing with Columbia Pictures, Moore was loaned to RKO for Mighty Joe Young (1949), which brought her widespread recognition. She subsequently received an Academy Award nomination for Best Supporting Actress for her performance in Come Back, Little Sheba (1952). Beginning with Elia Kazan's Man on a Tightrope (1953), Moore worked extensively at 20th Century-Fox throughout the 1950s, appearing in such films as Beneath the 12-Mile Reef (1953), King of the Khyber Rifles (1953), Daddy Long Legs (1955), Between Heaven and Hell (1956), and Peyton Place (1957).

Moore also worked extensively in television, including a regular role in the Western series Empire (1962–1963) and guest appearances on such programs as Bonanza, Batman, Burke's Law, True Detective, and Ray Donovan. Moore gained notoriety when she claimed that she and billionaire Howard Hughes had been secretly married aboard a ship in 1949. The claim was disputed, and the marriage was never legally recognized, though she received a financial settlement from Hughes's estate. Moore is one of the last surviving stars of the Golden Age of Hollywood.

== Biography ==
=== Child actress ===
Moore was born January 7, 1929, in Glendale, California, and grew up in a Mormon family in Los Angeles.

Moore's early appearances include The Howards of Virginia (1940), On the Sunny Side (1942), My Gal Sal (1942), A-Haunting We Will Go (1942), True to Life (1943), Gaslight (1944) (playing Ingrid Bergman's character as a child), Since You Went Away (1944), Sweet and Low-Down (1944), and The Clock (1945). As Helen Koford, she had a supporting role in Son of Lassie (1945) and Shadowed (1946). As "Jan Ford" she was billed third in The Devil on Wheels (1947) at Monogram. She was uncredited in Heartaches (1948) and Summer Holiday (1948).

Moore worked in radio in the 1940s, most memorably as Bumps Smith on The Smiths of Hollywood.

=== Columbia ===
Moore's career received a boost when Columbia Pictures signed her to a long-term contract. She had the lead in The Return of October (1948) with Glenn Ford, playing a character called Terry Ramsey, after which Terry became her stage name.

Moore was borrowed by RKO to star in Mighty Joe Young (1949), a film about a giant gorilla that won the Academy Award for Best Visual Effects. George Pal cast her in The Great Rupert (1950) with Jimmy Durante.

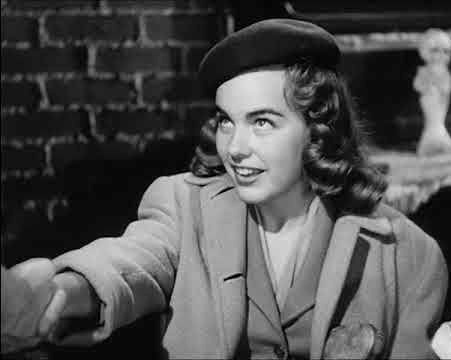
Moore in The Great Rupert (1950)

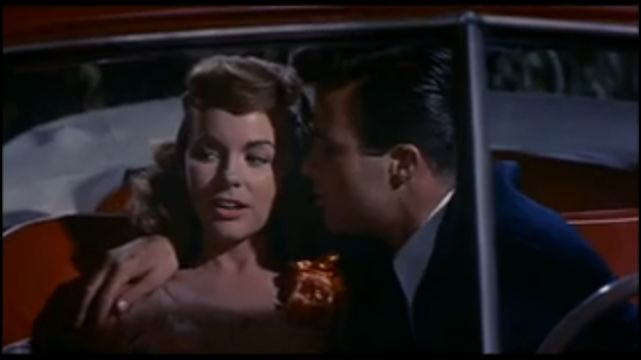
Moore and Barry Coe in Peyton Place (1957)

At Columbia, Moore co-starred with Mickey Rooney in He's a Cockeyed Wonder (1950). She also did Gambling House (1950) with Victor Mature at RKO, Two of a Kind (1951), Sunny Side of the Street (1951), and The Barefoot Mailman (1951).

Moore played Marie Buckholder in Come Back, Little Sheba (1952), produced by Hal Wallis, with Burt Lancaster and Shirley Booth as co-stars. She was nominated for an Academy Award for Best Supporting Actress for her performance.

Moore began appearing in television shows like The Ford Television Theatre and appeared on the cover of Life magazine on July 6, 1953, as "Hollywood's sexy tomboy". Her photo was used on the cover of the second issue of the My Diary romance comic book (cover dated March 1950).

=== 20th Century Fox ===
Elia Kazan cast Moore in the female lead in the 20th Century Fox drama Man on a Tightrope (1953). Fox then signed Moore to a long-term contract. It gave her the female lead in Beneath the 12-Mile Reef (1953), the second film in CinemaScope and a big hit. Also popular was King of the Khyber Rifles (1953) with Tyrone Power.

Moore supported Fred Astaire in Daddy Long Legs (1955) and had the lead in some thrillers: Shack Out on 101 (1955) and Portrait of Alison (1955).

Between Heaven and Hell (1956) reunited her with Robert Wagner, the leading man in Beneath the 12-Mile Reef. She guest-starred on TV shows like The 20th Century-Fox Hour, General Electric Theater, Playhouse 90, Climax!, Studio One in Hollywood, and Rawhide.

Fox used her in Bernardine (1957) with Pat Boone and Peyton Place (1957) with Lana Turner. They then put her in the less popular A Private's Affair (1959). She was Audie Murphy's leading lady in Cast a Long Shadow (1959).

=== 1960s ===
Moore had the lead in Platinum High School (1960) and Why Must I Die? (1960), producing the latter.

Moore guest starred on Checkmate and The Rebel and had a regular role as a rancher's daughter in the NBC Western Empire. She also appeared on the NBC interview program Here's Hollywood.

Other appearances during this period include Black Spurs (1965), Town Tamer (1965), Bob Hope Presents the Chrysler Theatre, Waco (1966), and A Man Called Dagger (1968) as well as episodes of The Virginian, and Batman.

=== 1970s ===
Moore's 1970s appearances included Quarantined (1970), Bonanza, The Daredevil (1972), Smash-Up on Interstate 5 (1976), and Death Dimension (1978).

=== 1980s ===
In the 1980s Moore's roles included appearances in Double Exposure (1982), Hellhole (1985), Going Overboard (1989), American Boyfriends (1989), and Jake Spanner, Private Eye (1989) and episodes of Matt Houston, Knight Rider, Fantasy Island, The Love Boat, True Confessions, and Wiseguy.

At age 55, Moore posed nude in the August 1984 issue of Playboy magazine, photographed by Ken Marcus. She also appeared in theatre.

Moore appeared in and did the story for Beverly Hills Brats (1989).

=== Later career ===
Moore was in Murder, She Wrote; Marilyn and Me (both in 1991); American Southern (1995); Second Chances (1998) (which she also produced); Mighty Joe Young (1998); and Final Voyage (1999).

Moore produced but did not appear in America's Funniest Home Videos and Nandi (1998).

In the 2000s, Moore's appearances include roles in Stageghost (2000), Kill Your Darlings (2006), The Still Life (2007), Dewitt & Maria (2010), a guest-starring role as Lilly Hill on the crime series True Detective (2014), Aimy in a Cage (2015), Ray Donovan, and Silent Life: The Story of the Lady in Black (2019).

== Honors ==
For her contribution to motion pictures, Moore received a star on the Hollywood Walk of Fame on 1 February 1994, at 7076 Hollywood Blvd.

== Personal life ==
Moore married American football star and Heisman Trophy winner Glenn Davis (known as Mr. Outside when he played at the U.S. Military Academy at West Point) in 1951. They were divorced the following year. A subsequent marriage to Eugene McGarth in 1956 lasted three years. One year after this marriage ended, Moore married Stuart Cramer after his divorce from Jean Peters; they had two children together, Stuart Cramer IV and actor Grant Cramer, before divorcing in 1972. In 1979, Moore claimed to have married Richard F. Carey, in Mexico; he disappeared a few days later, having swindled her and others out of their money. Her 1992 marriage to Jerry Rivers lasted until his death in 2001.

Moore dated actor Glenn Ford in the early 1970s.

=== Relationship with Howard Hughes ===
Moore became the subject of public attention as a result of her relationship with Howard Hughes. According to Moore, she and Hughes were married in 1949 in a ceremony performed by a ship captain in international waters. Moore has said that Hughes destroyed the ship's log that recorded the marriage, and they separated from each other by 1956, but she and Hughes were never divorced. Moore has explained her subsequent marriages during Hughes' lifetime by saying, "I didn't care whether I was a bigamist or not, frankly. I mean, my desire to have children was that strong."

The Texas courts rejected Moore's claim of being Hughes' widow based on judicial estoppel; since Moore had claimed in her divorce from Cramer to have been married to him in 1959 and received a property settlement in that case, her claim that she was married to Hughes at the time was inconsistent with that and would not be accepted. Nevertheless, the Hughes heirs agreed that Moore had had a long-term relationship with Hughes and agreed to a financial settlement with her. Moore described the settlement as "not more than eight figures"; a biography of Hughes implies that the settlement was $350,000.

== Selected filmography ==
=== Film ===
Year	Title	Role	Notes
1940	Maryland	Girl	Uncredited
1940	The Howards of Virginia	Neighbor Girl	Uncredited
1942	On the Sunny Side	Little Girl	Uncredited
1942	My Gal Sal	Carrie Dreiser	Uncredited
1942	A-Haunting We Will Go	Dante's Young Admirer	Uncredited
1943	True to Life	Little Girl	Uncredited
1944	Since You Went Away	Refugee Child on Train	Uncredited
1944	Gaslight	Paula Alquist (age 14)	Uncredited
1945	The Clock	Girl at Museum	Uncredited
1945	Son of Lassie	Thea	Credited as 'Helen Koford'
1946	Shadowed	Virginia 'Ginny' Johnson	Credited as 'Helen Koford'
1947	The Devil on Wheels	Rusty Davis	Credited as 'Jan Ford'
1948	The Return of October	Terry Ramsey	
1949	Mighty Joe Young	Jill Young	
1950	The Great Rupert	Rosalinda Amendola	
1950	He's a Cockeyed Wonder	Judy Sears	
1951	Gambling House	Lynn Warren	
1951	Two of a Kind	Kathy McIntyre	
1951	Sunny Side of the Street	Betty Holloway	
1951	The Barefoot Mailman	Adie Titus	
1952	Come Back, Little Sheba	Marie Buckholder	
1953	Beneath the 12-Mile Reef	Gwyneth Rhys	
1953	King of the Khyber Rifles	Susan	
1955	Daddy Long Legs	Linda Pendleton	
1955	Shack Out on 101	Kotty	
1956	Portrait of Alison	Alison Ford	
1956	Between Heaven and Hell	Jenny Gifford	
1957	Bernardine	Jean Cantrick	
1957	Peyton Place	Betty Anderson	
1959	Cast a Long Shadow	Janet Calvert	
1959	A Private's Affair	Louise Wright	
1960	Platinum High School	Jennifer Evans	Alternative title: Trouble at Sixteen
1960	Why Must I Die?	Lois King	
1965	Black Spurs	Anna	
1965	Town Tamer	Susan Tavenner	
1965	City of Fear	Suzan	
1966	Waco	Dolly	
1968	A Man Called Dagger	Harper Davis	
1978	Death Dimension	Madam Maria	
1985	Hellhole	Sidnee Hammond	
1989	Going Overboard	Mistress	
1989	American Boyfriends	Al Walker	
1989	Beverly Hills Brats	Veronica	
1995	American Southern	Peggin	
1998	Mighty Joe Young	Elegant Woman at Party	
1998	Second Chances	Dallas Taylor Judd	
1999	Final Voyage	Christina	
2000	Stageghost	Olive	
2006	Kill Your Darlings	Ella Toscana	
2007	The Still Life	Mrs. Stratford	
2007	The Desert Rose	Jamie Shaw	
2009	Ariel	Liz	
2010	Dewitt & Maria	Terry	
2012	Margarine Wars	Miriam Cuningham	
2014	Aimy in a Cage	Grandma	
2014	Mansion of Blood	Natalie	
2016	Merrily	Betty Clurman	
2018	Saving Flora	Sylvia	
2019	Silent Life: The Story of the Lady in Black	Lady in Black	

=== Television ===
Year	Title	Role	Notes
1955	The United States Steel Hour	Caroline Schwendinger	Episode: "Scandal at Peppernut"
1956	The 20th Century Fox Hour	Ann Winslow	Episode: "The Moneymaker"
1958	Studio One	Annabelle	Episode: "The Man Who Asked for a Funeral"
1959	Rawhide	Dallas	Episode: "Incident Of The Tumbleweed"
1961	The Rebel	Janice	Episode: "The Executioner"
1962–1963	Empire	Connie Garrett	20 episodes
1963	Burke's Law	Sarah Kingston	Episode: "Who Killed Eleanora Davis?"
1966	My Three Sons	Eleanor	Episode: "Steve and the Huntress"
1966	The Virginian	Alma Wilson	Episode: "High Stakes"
1967	Batman	Venus	Episodes: "The Zodiac Crimes", "The Joker's Hard Times", and "The Penguin Declines"
1970	Quarantined	Martha Atkinson	Television movie
1970	Bonanza	Lydia Yates	Episode: "Gideon the Good"
1976	Smash-Up on Interstate 5	Trudy	Television movie
1983	Matt Houston	Emily Armor	Episode: "A Novel Way to Die"
1983	Knight Rider	Molly Friedrich	Episode: "K.I.T.T. the Cat"
1983	Fantasy Island	Audrey Wilkins	Episode: "The Butler's Affair/Roarke's Sacrifice"
1988	Wiseguy	Dr. Leitner	Episode: "Phantom Pain"; Uncredited
1991	Marilyn & Me	Woman at Hyde's Funeral	Television movie
2014	True Detective	Lilly Hill	Episode: "Form and Void"
2016	Ray Donovan	Nazani Minassian	Episode: "Norman Saves the World"

== Award and nominations ==
Award	Year	Category	Work	Result	Ref.
Academy Award	1953	Best Supporting Actress	Come Back, Little Sheba	Nominated	
