= Shadowed =

1946 film by John Sturges

- Theatrical release poster
- Directed by: John Sturges
- Written by: Julian Harmon; Brenda Weisberg
- Produced by: John Haggott
- Starring: Anita Louise; Lloyd Corrigan; Robert Scott
- Cinematography: Henry Freulich
- Edited by: James Sweeney
- Production company: Columbia Pictures
- Distributed by: Columbia Pictures
- Release date: September 26, 1946
- Running time: 70 minutes
- Country: United States
- Language: English
- Budget: less than $100,000

Shadowed, also known as The Gloved Hand, is a 1946 American film noir crime film directed by John Sturges and starring Anita Louise, Lloyd Corrigan, and Robert Scott. It was produced and distributed by Columbia Pictures.

== Plot ==
Salesman Fred J. Johnson manages to hit a hole-in-one as he plays golf one day, and he writes his initials and the date on the lucky ball. He swings at the same ball once more, but sends it into a ditch instead of towards the hole. When he goes to the ditch to get the ball, he finds a dead woman, as well, and next to the body lies a small package, which contains plates for forging dollar bills.

Fred takes the package from the dead woman. The returning murderer and his wife find Fred's marked golf ball upon returning for the packet of plates, and suspect that a man with the initials F.J. has taken the package. Before leaving, the man raises his voice in the culvert, because he suspects the golfer is in hiding, and warns "F.J." not to go to the police with the package, threatening to kill him and his whole family if he does.

Fred goes back to his family, and opens the package, finding the address to a print shop with the plates. He doesn't call the police, remembering the threat. Returning to their boss, Lefty, the couple are chastized for losing the package, and punishment is subtlety suggested by him whilst playing Patience, Solitaire: the "Boys won't like it" sic.

The murder is all over the news the next day, and Fred discovers that his lucky charm is missing from the chain of his watch. His daughter Carol goes out on a date with a banker named Mark Bellaman, and his other daughter Ginny goes to the golf course with her young beau Lester Binkey, a budding criminologist. Examining the location where the body was found, she finds her father's lucky charm.

Pretending to be a detective investigating the crime, the murderer returns to the golf club, and bullies a gardener into giving him a list of those who played the golf course the day before. He hears Ginny speak her name, and realizes she is Fred's daughter. He offers to drive her home to her father, saying he is an old friend of his.

When Fred goes to send the plates to the police anonymously by mail, he is followed by Lefty, who is only prevented from seizing them because a policeman friend of Fred's just happens to stop and speak to him.

Ginny is called in to speak to Lt. Braden about the murder, because she ran away when a policeman approached her and Lester at the golf course. This leads Braden to question Fred, and his suspicions are raised when Fred gives a contradictory account of Lester's conversation with him than the one Lester gave at the police station. Braden orders one of his men, Sellers, to tail Fred afterwards.

Later that night, Ginny is kidnapped by Lefty and his gang. They tell Fred that she will be killed if he doesn't give them the plates. They agree on an exchange, but Fred won't give the plates away even after Ginny is returned safely. Tony, the murderer, pulls a gun on him, but his wife Edna panics and rushes to the window to scream for help. Tony shoots Edna in the back, and Fred manages to knock down Tony with a golf club. Confronting Lefty whilst holding the club, Fred warns him not to move by telling him how long he's been using them, so Lefty sits down, and waits for the police to arrive.

In the papers the next day, Fred is mentioned as a hero who caught the murderer.

The family is reunited in happiness.

== Cast ==
- Anita Louise as Carol Johnson
- Lloyd Corrigan as Fred Johnson
- Michael Duane as Lt. Braden
- Mark Roberts as Mark Bellman (as Robert Scott)
- Doris Houck as Edna Montague
- Terry Moore as Virginia 'Ginny' Johnson (as Helen Koford)
- Wilton Graff as Tony Montague
- Eric Roberts as Lester Binkey
- Paul E. Burns as Lefty
