= The Veil of Twilight =

- Film poster
- Skumringslandet
- Directed by: Paul Magnus Lundø
- Written by: Paul Magnus Lundø
- Release date: October 2014
- Country: Norway
- Language: Norwegian

The Veil of Twilight (originally called Skumringslandet) is a Norwegian film written and directed by Paul Magnus Lundø about the investigation of a mysterious serial-killer in a mountain village, set in Norway in the mid 14th century.

== Cast ==
- Leif Nygaard
- Ewen Bremner
- Kim Bodnia
- Andreas Wilson
- Jørgen Langhelle
- Kristina Knaben Hennestad
- Nils Utsi
