= Two of a Kind (1951 film) =

1951 film by Henry Levin

- Theatrical release poster
- Directed by: Henry Levin
- Screenplay by: Lawrence Kimble; James Gunn
- Based on: magazine story "Lefty Farrell" by James Edward Grant
- Produced by: William Dozier
- Starring: Edmond O'Brien; Lizabeth Scott; Terry Moore
- Cinematography: Burnett Guffey
- Edited by: Charles Nelson
- Music by: George Duning
- Production company: Columbia Pictures
- Distributed by: Columbia Pictures
- Release date: June 1, 1951
- Running time: 75 minutes
- Country: United States
- Language: English

Two of a Kind is a 1951 American crime film directed by Henry Levin and starring Edmond O'Brien, Lizabeth Scott and Terry Moore.

== Plot ==
Mike Farrell is induced by con artists Brandy Kirby and attorney Vincent Mailer to purloin a rich couple's $10 million-dollar estate by having Farrell pose as their long-lost son.

When the old man refuses to change his will, Mailer decides to kill the couple and Kirby plays along. Farrell refuses to assist and Mailer plans to kill him as well. After a botched murder attempt, with Kirby's help, Farrell exposes the scam to the old man, dooming Mailer's plan and allowing Kirby and Farrell to unite.

== Cast ==
- Edmond O'Brien as Michael 'Lefty' Farrell
- Lizabeth Scott as Brandy Kirby
- Terry Moore as Kathy McIntyre
- Alexander Knox as Vincent Mailer
- Griff Barnett as William McIntyre
- Virginia Brissac as Maida McIntyre
- Robert Anderson as Todd

== Production ==
The script is based on a magazine story titled "Lefty Farrell" by James Edward Grant. The film project was announced in early 1950 under the title Two of a Kind with Edward Buzzell as director and Jerome Chodorov to work on the screen adaptation of Grant's story. Larry Parks was initially slated to play the lead role, with Ann Sheridan believed to be the most likely candidate for the role of Brandy. However, negotiations with Sheridan failed and Lucille Ball was reported to have won the role, but the project was abruptly canceled in March 1950 because of problems with the script.

The project was restarted later in 1950 with Rick Jason cast in the Lefty Farrell role and Lizabeth Scott as the female lead. Just before production was to begin, Jason was forced to withdraw after suffering a back injury while swimming, and Edmond O'Brien was quickly signed as his replacement.

Filming began on October 10, 1950 and wrapped by early November.

The film had been produced as Two of a Kind, but in late 1950, Columbia Pictures changed the title to Lefty Farrell. The title reverted to Two of a Kind before the film's release in June 1951.

== Reception ==
In the New York Daily News, critic Wanda Hale wrote: "'Two of a Kind' tells an oft-told tale and doesn't tell it exceptionally well."
