= The King of Ping Pong =

- Theatrical release poster for Ping-pongkingen
- Directed by: Jens Jonsson
- Written by: Jens Jonsson; Hans Gunnarsson
- Produced by: Jan Blomgren
- Starring: Georgi Staykov; Ann-Sofie Normi; Frederik Nilsson; Jerry Johansson
- Cinematography: Askild Vik Edvardsen
- Edited by: Kristofer Nordin
- Music by: Martin Willert
- Release dates: 18 January 2008 (Sundance); 8 February 2008 (Sweden)
- Running time: 107 minutes
- Country: Sweden
- Language: Swedish

The King of Ping Pong (Swedish: Ping-pongkingen) is a 2008 Swedish film directed by Jens Jonsson, who also co-wrote the film with Hans Gunnarsson. The film revolves around a dysfunctional family, including a teenager Rille. It was featured and won two awards at the 2008 Sundance Film Festival. It received mostly positive reception.

== Plot summary ==
Taking place in northern Sweden, the film is about obese teenager Rille who loves to play ping pong, in which he wins against younger kids. While not playing table tennis, he has to deal with bullies and his younger sibling. Their mother tries to start a hairdressing operation from her home during her children's spring break. The father gets his children into all sorts of bizarre situations, which prompts Rille to wonder if the man really is their father.

== Production ==
The film was written by the director Jonsson and Hans Gunnarsson. Askild Vik Edvardsen was the cinematographer and Josefin Åsberg was the production designer. Justin Lowe wrote for the Associated Press that Jonsson and Gunnarson "keep the film's slightly off-kilter comedy reinforced by occasional visual puns" and that "Cinematographer Askild Vik Edvardsen bathes the proceedings with wintry-filtered light that's well suited to the sedate camerawork". The camerawork was compared to that of Roy Andersson by the International Film Festival Rotterdam.

== Release ==
It competed in the World Cinema Dramatic Competition at the 2008 Sundance Film Festival where it received the Grand Jury Prize: World Cinema and the World Cinema Cinematography Award.

== Reception ==
On the review aggregator website Rotten Tomatoes, 60% of 5 critics' reviews are positive. Rob Hunter, writing for Film School Rejects, gave the film a B−, saying, "An interesting and peculiarly Swedish take on the coming-of-age theme, the movie is worth watching for folks with patience". The film received 3 and half stars out of five from VPRO.

Awards
Preceded by Sweet Mud	Grand Jury Prize: World Cinema Dramatic; 2008	Succeeded by The Maid
Preceded by Manda Bala (Send a Bullet)	World Cinema Cinematography Award: Dramatic; 2008	Succeeded by An Education
