= Bicycle Bride =

- Directed by: Hassan Zee
- Written by: Hassan Zee
- Produced by: Lawrence Dillon; Hassan Zee
- Starring: Andreas Wilson; Melanie Kannokada; Shruti Tewari; Ponni Swaminathan Chesser
- Cinematography: William Preston; Matt Sumney
- Edited by: Jeremy Huff
- Production company: Zee Films
- Release date: June 25, 2010
- Running time: 114 minutes
- Country: United States
- Language: English

Bicycle Bride is a comedy film directed by Hassan Zee and starring Andreas Wilson, Melanie Kannokada, Shruti Tewari, Jessica Kitchens, Rajiv Nema, Veronica Valencia, and Jonathan Bock. The film opened in San Francisco at the Viz Cinema on June 25, 2010.

== Plot ==
An Indian girl wants the freedom to choose her own destiny and the love of her life, but her mother wants to marry her off in an arranged marriage.

The film portrays an intriguing mix of matchmakers, bhangra dancers, psychic healers, and religious fanatics, and addresses one of the most important issues in contemporary Muslim culture: women’s rights, veils and burkas.

== Cast ==
- Andreas Wilson as James Dean
- Melanie Kannokada as Beena
- Shruti Tewari as Billo
- Rajiv Nema as Bubba
