= 2008 Sundance Film Festival =

2008 film festival edition

- Opening film: In Bruges
- Closing film: CSNY/Déjà Vu
- Location: Park City, Salt Lake City, Ogden, and Sundance, Utah
- Hosted by: Sundance Institute
- No. of films: 122
- Festival date: January 17–27, 2008
- Language: English
- Website: sundance.org/festival
- 2009 Sundance Film Festival 2007 Sundance Film Festival

The 2008 Sundance Film Festival ran from January 17, 2008 to January 27 in Park City, Utah. It was the 24th iteration of the Sundance Film Festival. The opening night film was In Bruges and the closing night film was CSNY/Déjà Vu.

== Films ==
Out of 2,021 U.S. and 1,603 international feature-length films submitted for consideration, 121 were selected to be shown at the festival.

For a list of films that were shown at the festival, see List of films at the 2008 Sundance Film Festival.

== Awards ==
- Grand Jury Prize: Documentary - Trouble the Water
- Grand Jury Prize: Dramatic - Frozen River
- Grand Jury Prize: World Cinema Documentary - Man On Wire
- Grand Jury Prize: World Cinema Dramatic - The King of Ping Pong (Ping Pongkingen)
- Audience Award: Documentary - Fields of Fuel
- Audience Award: Dramatic - The Wackness
- World Cinema Audience Award: Documentary - Man on Wire
- World Cinema Audience Award: Dramatic - Captain Abu Raed
- Directing Award: Documentary - American Teen
- Directing Award: Dramatic - Ballast
- World Cinema Directing Award: Documentary - Durakovo: The Village of Fools (Durakovo: Le Village Des Fous)
- World Cinema Directing Award: Dramatic - Mermaid (Rusalka)
- Waldo Salt Screenwriting Award - Sleep Dealer
- World Cinema Screenwriting Award - I Always Wanted to Be a Gangster (J'ai Toujours Rêvé d'Être un Gangster)
- Documentary Editing Award - Roman Polanski: Wanted and Desired
- World Cinema Documentary Editing Award - The Art Star and the Sudanese Twins
- Excellence in Cinematography Award: Documentary - Patti Smith: Dream of Life
- Excellence in Cinematography Award: Dramatic - Ballast
- World Cinema Cinematography Award: Documentary - Recycle
- World Cinema Cinematography Award: Dramatic - The King of Ping Pong (Ping Pongkingen)
- World Cinema Special Jury Prize: Dramatic - Blue Eyelids (Párpados Azules)
- Special Jury Prize: Documentary - The Greatest Silence: Rape in the Congo
- Special Jury Prize: Dramatic, The Spirit of Independence - Anywhere, USA
- Special Jury Prize: Dramatic, Work by an Ensemble Cast - Choke
- Jury Prize in Short Filmmaking - My Olympic Summer
- Jury Prize in Short Filmmaking - Sikumi (On the Ice)
- International Jury Prize in International Short Filmmaking - Soft
- Honorable Mention in Short Filmmaking - Aquarium
- Honorable Mention in Short Filmmaking - August 15th
- Honorable Mention in Short Filmmaking - La Corona (The Crown)
- Honorable Mention in Short Filmmaking - Oiran Lyrics
- Honorable Mention in Short Filmmaking - Spider
- Honorable Mention in Short Filmmaking - Suspension
- Honorable Mention in Short Filmmaking - W.
- 2008 Alfred P. Sloan Prize - Sleep Dealer

== Juries ==
The juries at the Sundance Film Festival are responsible for determining the Jury Prize winners in each category and to award Special Jury Prizes as they see fit.

=== Jury, Independent Film Competition: Dramatic ===
- Marcia Gay Harden, Mary Harron, Diego Luna, Sandra Oh and Quentin Tarantino

=== Jury, Independent Film Competition: Documentary ===
- Michelle Byrd, Heidi Ewing, Eugene Jarecki, Steven Okazaki and Annie Sundberg

=== Jury, World Cinema Competition: Dramatic ===
- Shunji Iwai, Lucrecia Martel and Jan Schütte

=== Jury, World Cinema Competition: Documentary ===
- Amir Bar-Lev, Leena Pasanen and Ilda Santiago

=== Jury, Shorts Competition ===
- Jon Bloom, Melonie Diaz and Jason Reitman

=== Alfred P. Sloan Feature Film Prize Jury ===
- Alan Alda, Michael Polish, Evan Schwartz, Benedict Schwegler and John Underkoffler

== Festival Theaters ==
- Kimball Junction
  - Redstone Cinemas - 185 seats
- Ogden
  - Peery's Egyptian Theatre - 800 seats
- Park City
  - Eccles Theatre - 1,270 seats
  - Egyptian Theatre - 266 seats
  - Holiday Village Cinemas I - 156 seats
  - Holiday Village Cinemas II - 156 seats
  - Holiday Village Cinemas III - 156 seats
  - Holiday Village Cinemas IV - 164 seats
  - Library Center Theatre - 448 seats
  - Prospector Square Theatre - 332 seats
  - Racquet Club Theatre - 602 seats
  - Yarrow Hotel Theatre 1 - 250 seats
  - Yarrow Hotel Theatre 2 - 80 seats
- Salt Lake City
  - Broadway Centre Cinemas IV - 211 seats
  - Broadway Centre Cinemas V - 238 seats
  - Broadway Centre Cinemas VI - 274 seats
  - Rose Wagner Performing Arts Center - 485 seats
  - Tower Theatre - 342 seats
- Sundance Resort
  - Sundance Institute Screening Room - 164 seats
