= He's a Cockeyed Wonder =

1950 American comedy film directed by Peter Godfrey

- Theatrical release poster
- Directed by: Peter Godfrey
- Screenplay by: Jack Henley
- Produced by: Rudolph C. Flothow
- Starring: Mickey Rooney; Terry Moore; William Demarest; Charles Arnt; Ross Ford; Ned Glass
- Cinematography: Lester White
- Edited by: Richard Fantl
- Production company: Columbia Pictures
- Distributed by: Columbia Pictures
- Release date: December 2, 1950
- Running time: 76 minutes
- Country: United States
- Language: English

He's a Cockeyed Wonder is a 1950 American Columbia Pictures comedy film directed by Peter Godfrey and written by Jack Henley. The film stars Mickey Rooney, Terry Moore, William Demarest, Charles Arnt, Ross Ford and Ned Glass.

The film's working title was Freddie the Great.

== Plot ==
In the small orange-farming town of Caldwell, California, Bob Sears runs a plant that has been owned by the Caldwell family for generations. Bob's daughter Judy works at the plant as one of the nation's fastest orange packers. Freddie Frisby, who also works at the plant, is in love with Judy, but company owner J. B. Caldwell wants Judy to marry his nephew and head salesman Ralph. Bob dislikes Freddie and also encourages Judy to marry Ralph, but Judy resists Ralph's charms and prefers Freddie.

To please her father, Judy reluctantly agrees to a date with Ralph. Freddie is jealous and hides in the trunk of Ralph's car. At a drive-in feature while in the trunk, Freddie thinks that the voices of a persistent man and his beleaguered date in the film are those of Ralph and Judy and accosts Ralph. The next day at the plant, Bob intercepts Freddie's apology note to Judy and angrily fires him.

Freddie is approached by Sam Phillips, the agent of Frederick the Great, a wealthy magician and Freddie's uncle, who has recently died. Frederick has bequeathed his entire estate to Freddie, which consists of very little money but a truckload of possessions, including a full set of magic equipment, props and a raven named Jimmy that is used in the act. The agent convinces Freddie to assume the identity of Frederick the Great and perform the magic shows remaining in his uncle's $200-per-week contract. With Freddie's financial outlook suddenly transformed, Bob changes his opinion of Freddie and encourages him as he learns the magic tricks in his uncle's repertoire.

Freddie struggles to learn the magic act and destroys Ralph's expensive hat when he bungles a trick. When Jimmy destroys a prized possession, Bob chases Freddie from the house with his shotgun. Freddie is dejected and wants to abandon his magic career, but Judy encourages him to persist.

Criminals Lunk, Crabs and Pick take a room at a motel as they plan to rob the safe at Caldwell's plant, where all of Freddie's inherited possessions are also stored. Judy uses her father's key to gain entry to the plant at night so that Freddie can rehearse his act. The criminals also enter the plant and happen upon Freddie and Judy rehearsing. Fearing that Freddie and Judy could identify them to the police, the criminals kidnap them as they make their getaway. The police believe that Freddie and Judy are involved in the robbery. Bob argues that they are innocent, but various bits of coincidental circumstantial evidence seem to suggest their complicity.

At the criminals' hideout, Judy feigns romantic interest in Crabs in a ploy to free Freddie, but her plan backfires when Freeley forces Freddie to write a suicide note admitting guilt and absolving Judy. After Freeley leaves the room, Jimmy the raven appears and Freddie and Judy attach a message to him with a plea for help and their location. Jimmy flies to the Sears house and awakens Bob, who reads the note and phones the police. Bob and a car of officers drive frantically to the address. Outside the hideout, Freddie escapes from his captors and hides in a barn. He is then pursued by Crabs, who falls in a well just before the police arrive. The criminals are captured, Freddie explains that he and Judy are innocent, and Sam urges him to resume practicing.

Freddie marries Judy, who is brought to their honeymoon suite inside a mummy's tomb from Freddie's act.

== Cast ==
- Mickey Rooney as Freddie Frisby
- Terry Moore as Judy Sears
- William Demarest as Bob Sears
- Charles Arnt as J. B. Caldwell
- Ross Ford as Ralph Caldwell
- Ned Glass as Sam Phillips
- Mike Mazurki as Lunk Boxwell
- Douglas Fowley as Crabs Freeley
- William Phillips as Pick Reedley

== Reception ==
In a contemporary review for The New York Times, critic A. H. Weiler called the film "a witless farce" and wrote: "Mickey Rooney misses on all counts. His eyes, registering a sort of painful bewilderment, are perfectly normal and he's far from being a wonder."

Wanda Hale of the New York Daily News called He's a Cockeyed Wonder "an indifferent comedy, unworthy of the star's talent, but still not a total loss".
