= Hassan Zee =

Pakistani-American film director

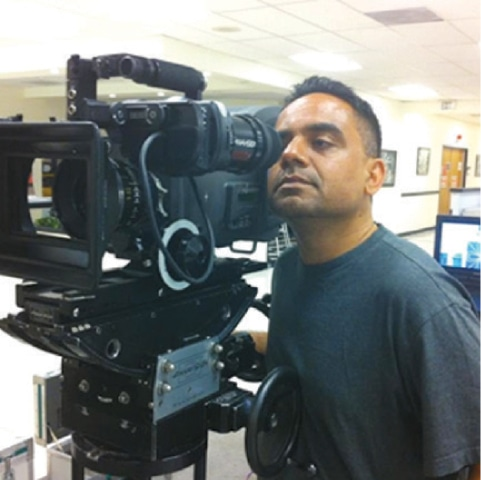

Hassan "Doctor" Zee is a Pakistani-American film director.

== Early life ==
Zee grew up in Chakwal, a small village in Punjab, Pakistan. as one of seven brothers and sisters His father was in the military and this fact required the family to move often to different cities. As a child Zee was forbidden from watching cinema because his father believed movies were a bad influence on children.

He received his early education from Jinnah Public School, Chakwal. He got his medical doctor degree at Rawalpindi Medical College, Pakistan.

At the age of 26, Zee earned his medical doctorate degree and did his residency in a burn unit at the Pakistan Institute of Medical Sciences. He cared for women who were victims of bride burning the archaic practice used as a form of punishment against women who failed to provide sufficient dowry to their in-laws after marriage or fail to provide offspring. He also witnessed how his country’s transgender and intersex people, called "hijras", were banned from having jobs and forced to beg to survive. These experiences inspired Zee to tackle the issues of women’s empowerment and gender inequality in his films.

== Film career ==
In 1999, Zee moved to San Francisco to pursue filmmaking.

Zee's first film titled Night of Henna was released in 2005. The theme of the film dealt with "the conflict between Old World immigrant customs and modern Western ways..." Night of Henna focused on the problems of Pakistani expatriates who found it hard to adjust in American culture. Many often landed themselves in trouble when it came to marrying off their children.

His second film Bicycle Bride came out in 2010, which was about "the clash between the bonds of family and the weight of tradition."

His third film House of Temptation that came out in 2014 was about a family which struggles against the temptations of the Devil.

His fourth film “Good Morning Pakistan”, concerned a young American’s journey back to Pakistan where he confronts the contradictory nature of a beautiful and ancient culture that's marred by economic, educational and gender inequality.

== Filmography ==
Year	Title	Awards
1996	The Dim Light (TV Movie)	
2001	My First Kiss (Short)	“Best Actor”, Film Arts Foundation
2005	Night of Henna	Won an award from the Panavision
2010	Bicycle Bride	"Best Feature Film Award", South Appalachian Film Festival.; "Best Bay Area Director," Vacaville Film Festival.; "Best Director", Modesto Bollywood Film Festival.
2012	Destination Love (Dil Kuch Aur Samjha Tha) (TV Movie)	
2014	House of Temptation	"Best Supporting Actor 2014", SF Best Actors Film Festival
2016	Zee Show (Video short)	
2018	Good Morning Pakistan	"Best Drama", Another Hole in the Head Film Festival 2018; "Official Selection", Haryana International Film Festival 2019
2020	Ghost in San Francisco	
