= Jada Rowland =

American actress (born 1943)

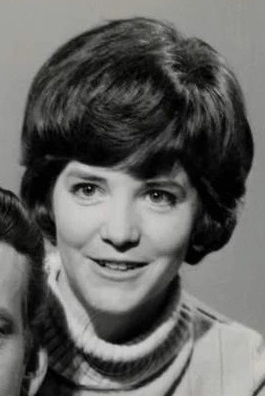
- Born: February 23, 1943 (age 83); Staten Island, New York City, U.S.
- Occupation: Actress
- Years active: 1949–1983
- Spouse: David Helfand (m. 1982)

Jada Rowland (born February 23, 1943) is an American actress.

== Early life ==
A native of Staten Island, Rowland was born into a family of actors and artists. Rowland is the sister of actor Jeffrey Rowland and actress Gigi Anderson. Her brother played her husband on As the World Turns (Dr. Dan Stewart), although they appeared on the show in different years. Rowland's sister appeared on The Secret Storm as Peggy Bennett during the time Rowland was working on the show.

== Career ==
Rowland's credits include appearances on Broadway and television daytime soap operas. She portrayed Dr. Susan Stewart on As the World Turns and was the second actress to portray Carolee Simpson Aldrich, R. N. on The Doctors. She began appearing as Carolee on September 7, 1976 and was a member of the cast until the final episode on December 31, 1982. She later appeared on the prime-time serial The Hamptons. Rowland was invited to audition for the Dustin Hoffman film Tootsie, since that feature film incorporated a fictional soap opera, Southwest General, but declined.

In her signature role, Rowland portrayed Amy Ames Britton Kincaid on The Secret Storm for most of its 20-year run. This character grew up in real time instead of the common soap-opera "rapid aging", where a young actor is replaced by an older one to age the character more quickly.

Published children's books she has illustrated include Bringing the Farmhouse Home (by Gloria Whelan, Simon & Schuster Books for Young Readers, 1992); Miss Tizzy (by Libba Moore Gray, Simon & Schuster Books for Young Readers, 1993); The Statue of Liberty (by Lucille Recht Penner, Random House, 1995); and Raising the Roof (by Ronald Kidd, Habitat for Humanity International, 1995).

== Filmography ==
=== Television ===
| Year | Title | Role | Notes |
|---|---|---|---|
| 1954, 1955 | Pond's Theater | Lee | 2 episodes |
| 1954–1973 | The Secret Storm | Amy Ames | 5,009 episodes |
| 1955 | The Devil's Disciple | Essie | Television film |
| 1955 | Producers' Showcase | Child / Little Mary | 2 episodes |
| 1956 | Star Tonight | Alice | Episode: "Early Frost" |
| 1959 | The United States Steel Hour | Sally | Episode: "Whisper of Evil" |
| 1959 | Deadline | Kathy | Episode: "Dumb Kid" |
| 1962 | Armstrong Circle Theatre | Peggy Hayward | Episode: "Journey to Oblivion" |
| 1968; 1986 | As The World Turns | Dr. Susan Burke Stewart | 1968-contract; 1986-temporary replacement for Marie Masters |
| 1969–1979 | Sesame Street | Jennie | 8 episodes |
| 1976–1982 | The Doctors | Carolee Simpson | 848 episodes |
