= Kronohemman =

Swedish-Finnish royalty controlled farms

Kronohemman ("crown farm") were Swedish-Finnish farms controlled by the royalty in a manner similar to feudalism. A lease by the royalty was usually given for 25 years and at the end of the peasant tenure the government compensated them for improvements. In 1898 an estimated 8000 out of 117,000 farms were royalty controlled.
