= Alias Boston Blackie =

1942 film

- Directed by: Lew Landers
- Written by: Paul Yawitz; Jack Boyle (character)
- Produced by: Wallace MacDonald
- Starring: Chester Morris; Adele Mara; Richard Lane
- Cinematography: Philip Tannura
- Edited by: Richard Fantl
- Music by: George Parrish
- Production company: Columbia Pictures
- Distributed by: Columbia Pictures
- Release date: April 2, 1942
- Running time: 67 minutes
- Country: United States
- Language: English

Alias Boston Blackie is a 1942 American crime film directed by Lew Landers. It is the third in a series of fourteen Columbia Pictures "B" movies starring Chester Morris as Boston Blackie. It was preceded by Meet Boston Blackie and Confessions of Boston Blackie and followed by Boston Blackie Goes Hollywood. Once again, Blackie is suspected of committing a crime, in this instance of helping a prisoner escape.

== Plot ==
In the Christmas spirit, Boston Blackie decides to entertain the inmates at his old "alma mater" by bringing a variety show headed by clown Roggi McKay. Roggi drops one of his showgirls, Eve Sanders, as she has already visited her prisoner brother, Joe Trilby, the maximum allowed number of times that month. However, Blackie kindheartedly lets her tag along.

Inspector Farraday and Detective Joe Mathews unexpectedly join the group on the bus, just to keep an eye on Blackie. When Joe manages to escape from the prison, by tying Roggi up and putting on his costume and makeup, Farraday suspects Blackie helped him.

Blackie heads to Eve's apartment. Sure enough, Joe shows up soon afterward. Joe claims he is innocent and that Duke Banton and someone named Steve got him to drive them to the crime scene without telling him why. When the robbery was foiled, they fled, leaving him behind. Now he wants to kill the pair, regardless of the consequences. Joe takes Blackie's suit and ties him up. Eve eventually arrives and frees him.

Blackie and his sidekick "the Runt" head to Duke Banton's place, but arrive too late and find only a dead body. Then Joe enters. He claims he did not kill Banton. When the police surround the building, Blackie has Joe switch places with Banton after Farraday has examined the corpse. The "body" is taken away in an ambulance. Blackie is taken into custody, but manages to overpower Detective Mathews, putting on his uniform to get away.

From information provided by Jumbo Madigan, Blackie figures out that the other robber was taxi driver Steve Caveroni. He has Eve pose as a fare to lure Caveroni to Banton's hotel room. Caveroni feels he is in control of the situation as he has a gun, so Blackie has little trouble getting him to confess he killed his partner (Banton was trying to flee, leaving Caveroni to take the blame) and that Joe is innocent. Farraday and his policemen eavesdrop through the door. Once he realizes he is trapped, Caveroni makes a break for it, but is shot dead.

== Cast ==
- Chester Morris as Boston Blackie
- Adele Mara as Eve Sanders
- Richard Lane as Inspector Farraday
- George E. Stone as "The Runt"
- Lloyd Corrigan as Arthur Manleder
- Walter Sande as Detective Mathews
- Larry Parks as Joe Trilby
- George McKay as Roggi McKay
- Cy Kendall as Jumbo Madigan
- Paul Fix as Steve Caveroni
- Ben Taggart as Warden

Lloyd Bridges plays the uncredited bus driver.
