= George E. Stone =

Polish-American actor (1903–1967)

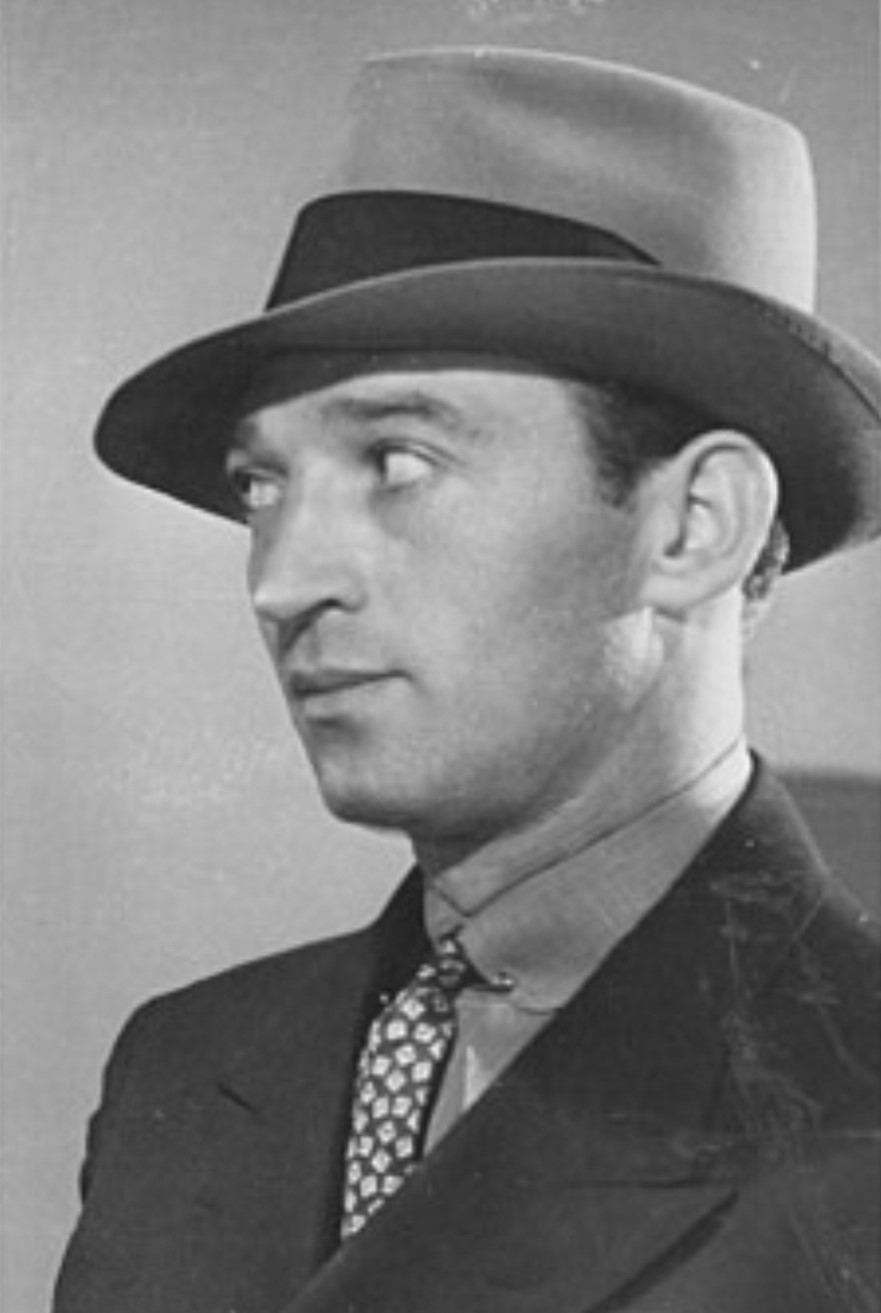
- Stone in Bullets or Ballots (1936)
- Born: Gerschon Lichtenstein; May 18, 1903; Łódź, Congress Poland, Russian Empire
- Died: May 26, 1967 (aged 64); Los Angeles, California, U.S.
- Resting place: Mount Sinai Memorial Park Cemetery
- Occupation: Actor
- Years active: 1925–1962
- Spouses: Ida Pleet (m. 1937; div. 1938) Marjorie Ramey (m. 1946; div. 1948)

George E. Stone (born Gerschon Lichtenstein; May 18, 1903 – May 26, 1967) was a Polish-born American character actor in films, radio, and television.

== Life and career ==
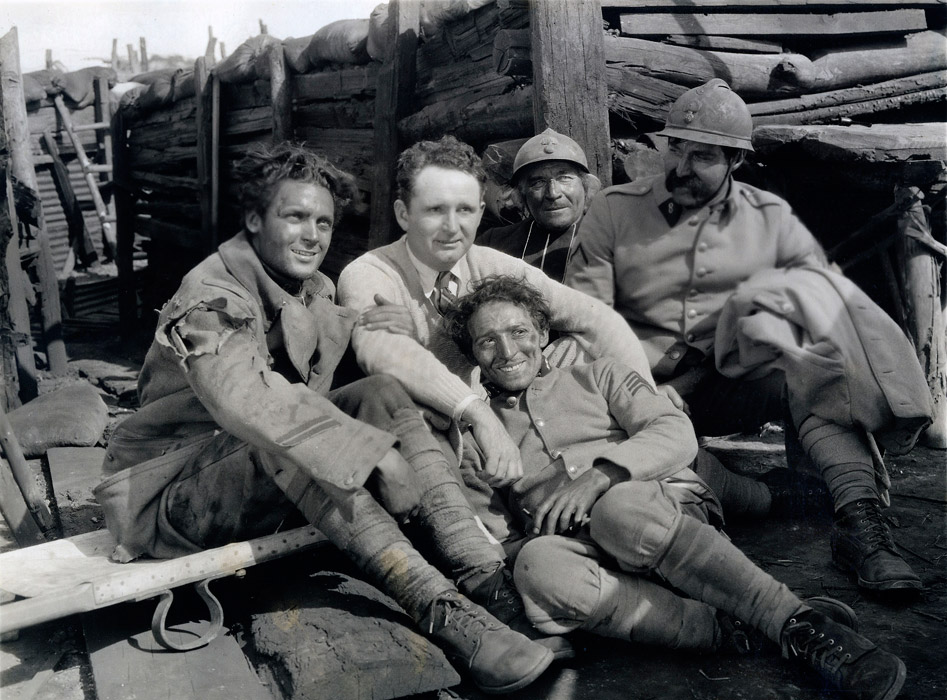
Director Frank Borzage (center) on the battlefield set of 7th Heaven with cast members (from left) Charles Farrell, George E. Stone (reclining), Émile Chautard and David Butler (1927)

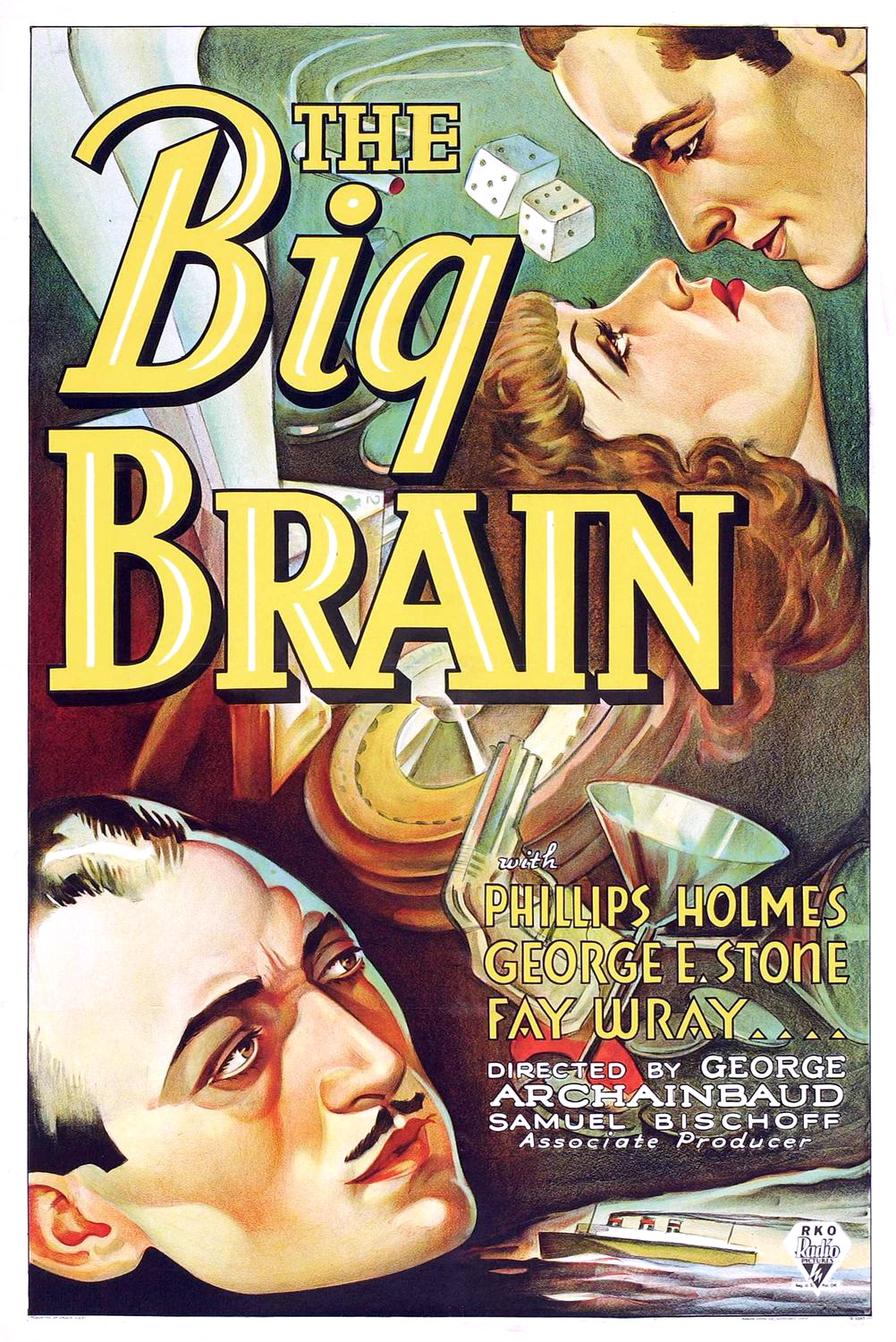
Poster for The Big Brain (1933) starring Stone (lower left)

Stone was born Gerschon Lichtenstein in Łódź, Congress Poland, into a Jewish family. He sailed from the Port of Hamburg, Germany, as a steerage passenger on board the S/S President Grant, which arrived at the Port of New York on May 29, 1913; at Ellis Island, he passed federal immigrant inspection with his two sisters and a brother.

As an actor, Stone first attracted attention (as "Georgie Stone") in the 1927 silent film 7th Heaven, where he played the local street thug The Sewer Rat; audiences remembered his slight build and very expressive face. He made a successful transition to talking pictures in Warner Bros.' Tenderloin, speaking in a pleasant, slightly nasal tenor. Stone was then typecast in streetwise roles, often playing a Runyonesque mobster or a gangland boss's assistant, notably as Rico Bandello's right-hand man Otero in the gangster classic Little Caesar (1931). He adopted a dapper pencil moustache for these screen roles. One of his most famous appearances was in the classic musical 42nd Street (1933), in which wiseguy Stone assesses a promiscuous chorus girl: "She only said 'no' once, and then she didn't hear the question!" His one starring film (as George E. Stone) was the Universal Pictures gangster comedy The Big Brain (1933).

In 1939, comedy producer Hal Roach hired Stone for his film The Housekeeper's Daughter. It was a difficult role: Stone had to play a mentally impaired murderer in a sweet natured and sympathetic manner. Stone went clean-shaven, emphasizing a boyish, innocent look, and played the part so sensitively that Roach often cast him in other films. In 1942, Stone burlesqued Hirohito in Roach's wartime comedy The Devil with Hitler. Stone repeated his Japanese characterization, this time dramatically, in the 1942 film Little Tokyo, U.S.A.; he played the Japanese agent, Kingoro.

George E. Stone's most familiar role was "The Runt", loyal sidekick to adventurous ex-criminal Boston Blackie in Columbia Pictures' action-comedy series. Stone was supposed to perform with Chester Morris in the first film of the series, Meet Boston Blackie, but was sidelined by a virus. Actor Charles Wagenheim filled in for him, and Stone joined the series in the second entry, Confessions of Boston Blackie. Stone's performances in the Blackies were well received, and he enthusiastically played scenes for laughs, doing dialects, disguising in women's clothes, posing as a child, or reacting in wide-eyed amazement or frustration to each story's twists and turns. Both Chester Morris and George E. Stone reprised their screen roles for one year in the Boston Blackie radio series. Illness struck Stone again in 1948, forcing him to bow out of the last Boston Blackie picture, Boston Blackie's Chinese Venture (released in 1949); he was replaced by Sid Tomack.

Even in his smallest roles, Stone made an impression. In the 1945 newspaper-themed feature Midnight Manhunt, he plays a murder victim who doesn't say a word but expires eloquently. Another tiny role has Stone contributing to the perennial holiday favorite Miracle on 34th Street – but not in the film. He appears in the coming-attractions trailer, as an openly cynical screenwriter confronted by a bossy movie producer.

Stone made guest appearances in movies and television through the 1950s, in situation comedies (The George Burns and Gracie Allen Show) and action-adventure shows (Adventures of Superman, as mob leader "Big George"). When it came to playing tough guys, Stone could be just as convincing as the biggest, brawniest men. In the feature film The Man with the Golden Arm, Stone is the vindictive mobster who has been cheated at cards, and attacks dealer Frank Sinatra's friend Arnold Stang in a brutal fistfight.

Stone's vision deteriorated in the late 1950s, limiting him to walk-on roles or undemanding character parts. He played nervous stool pigeon "Toothpick Charlie" in Billy Wilder's comedy hit Some Like It Hot, and became a TV regular in the popular Perry Mason series, appearing in 44 episodes in the minor role of the court clerk, and two additional episodes in other roles.

One of Stone's closest friends was reporter-humorist Damon Runyon. Stone often appeared in movie adaptations of Runyon's work, including the musical Guys and Dolls. In Stone's last film, Pocketful of Miracles (1961), directed by Frank Capra, he played the uncredited role of a blind beggar.

== Illness and death ==
Throughout his career, Stone was sidelined by illness. In 1936, he had pneumonia and lost out on a film role. Later illnesses forced him to miss the first and the last of the Boston Blackie pictures. In the early 1950s he began losing his sight to the point of almost total blindness in both eyes. He told The Daily Mirror in November 1958, "To me, it meant the end of everything I'd taken for granted." In 1958, he underwent surgery to save his sight. In fact, his sight was so limited by the time that he played the court clerk on Perry Mason that he had to be led around the set by his co-stars.

After suffering a major stroke in 1966 which left him bedridden and unable to speak, Stone spent the majority of his last year of life at the Motion Picture Country Home until he died May 26, 1967. His resting place is at Mount Sinai Memorial Park Cemetery.

== Recognition ==
For his contributions to motion pictures, Stone received a star on the Hollywood Walk of Fame on February 8, 1960. The star is located at 6932 Hollywood Boulevard, between North Orange Drive and North Highland Avenue, across the street from Grauman's Chinese Theatre, now known as TCL Chinese Theatre.

== Selected filmography ==
- Seventh Heaven (1927) - Sewer Rat
- Brass Knuckles (1927) - Velvet Smith
- San Francisco Nights (1928) - 'Flash' Hoxy
- Turn Back the Hours (1928) - Limey
- Tenderloin (1928) - Sparrow
- The Crimson City (1928) - Slinkey
- Walking Back (1928) - Crook (uncredited)
- Clothes Make the Woman (1928) - Assistant Director
- The Racket (1928) - Joe Scarsi
- Beautiful But Dumb (1928) - Tad
- State Street Sadie (1928) - Slinky
- Naughty Baby (1928) - Tony Caponi
- Weary River (1929) - Blackie
- The Redeeming Sin (1929) - A Sewer Rat
- Two Men and a Maid (1929) - Shorty
- The Girl in the Glass Cage (1929) - Carlos
- Melody Lane (1929) - Danny
- Skin Deep (1929) - Dippy
- Under a Texas Moon (1930) - Pedro
- The Medicine Man (1930) - Steve
- Little Caesar (1931) - Otero
- Cimarron (1931) - Sol Levy
- The Front Page (1931) - Earl Williams
- Maid to Order (1931)
- Five Star Final (1931) - Ziggie Feinstein
- The Spider (1931) - Dr. Blackstone
- Sob Sister (1931) - Johnnie the Sheik
- The Woman from Monte Carlo (1932) - Le Duc
- Taxi! (1932) - Skeets
- The World and the Flesh (1932) - Rutchkin
- The Last Mile (1932) - Joe Berg - Cell 1
- The Phantom of Crestwood (1932) - The Cat
- File 113 (1933) - Verduet
- The Vampire Bat (1933) - Kringen
- 42nd Street (1933) - Andy Lee
- Sailor Be Good (1933) - Murphy
- Song of the Eagle (1933) - Gus
- Emergency Call (1933) - Sammie Miller
- The Wrecker (1933) - Sam Shapiro
- The Big Brain (1933) - Max Werner
- He Couldn't Take It (1933) - Sammy Kohn
- Sing Sinner Sing (1933) - Spats
- Penthouse (1933) - Murtoch
- Ladies Must Love (1933) - Joey
- King for a Night (1933) - Hymie
- Frontier Marshal (1934) - David 'Abe' Ruskin
- Viva Villa! (1934) - Emilio Chavito
- Return of the Terror (1934) - Soapy McCoy
- The Dragon Murder Case (1934) - Tatum
- Embarrassing Moments (1934) - Louie
- Secret of the Chateau (1934) - Armand
- One Hour Late (1934) - Benny
- Million Dollar Baby (1934) - Joe Lewis
- Hold 'Em Yale (1935) - Bennie South Street
- Public Hero No. 1 (1935) - Butch
- Make a Million (1935) - Larkey
- Moonlight on the Prairie (1935) - Small Change
- Frisco Kid (1935) - Solly
- Freshman Love (1936) - E. Prendergast Biddle
- Man Hunt (1936) - Silk
- Boulder Dam (1936) - Man Aiding Ann (uncredited)
- Bullets or Ballots (1936) - Wires Kagel
- Rhythm on the Range (1936) - Shorty
- Anthony Adverse (1936) - Sancho
- Jailbreak (1936) - Weeper
- Back to Nature (1936) - Mr. Sweeney (uncredited)
- Here Comes Carter (1936) - Boots Burnett
- The Captain's Kid (1936) - Steve
- Polo Joe (1936) - First Loafer
- King of Hockey (1936) - Nick Torga
- Don't Get Me Wrong (1937) - Chuck
- Clothes and the Woman (1937) - Count Bernhardt
- Back in Circulation (1937) - Mac
- Alcatraz Island (1937) - 'Tough Tony' Burke
- The Adventurous Blonde (1937) - Pete
- A Slight Case of Murder (1938) - Kirk
- Mr. Moto's Gamble (1938) - Connors
- Over the Wall (1938) - Gyp
- You and Me (1938) - Patsy
- Submarine Patrol (1938) - Seaman Irving Goldfarb
- Long Shot (1939) - Danny Welch
- You Can't Get Away with Murder (1939) - Toad
- The Housekeeper's Daughter (1939) - Benny
- The Night of Nights (1939) - Sammy Kayn
- I Take This Woman (1940) - Sid
- Island of Doomed Men (1940) - Siggy
- Cherokee Strip (1940) - Abe Gabbert
- Slightly Tempted (1940) - Petey
- North West Mounted Police (1940) - Johnny Pelang
- The Face Behind the Mask (1941) - Dinky
- Road Show (1941) - Indian
- Broadway Limited (1941) - Lefty
- Last of the Duanes (1941) - Euchre
- Confessions of Boston Blackie (1941) - The Runt
- The Lone Star Ranger (1942) - Euchre
- The Affairs of Jimmy Valentine (1942) - Mousey
- Alias Boston Blackie (1942) - The Runt
- Little Tokyo, U.S.A. (1942) - Kingoro
- Boston Blackie Goes Hollywood (1942) - The Runt
- After Midnight with Boston Blackie (1943) - The Runt
- The Chance of a Lifetime (1943) - The Runt
- Timber Queen (1944) - Squirrel
- Roger Touhy, Gangster (1944) - 'Ice Box' Hamilton
- My Buddy (1944) - Pete
- One Mysterious Night (1944) - The Runt
- Boston Blackie Booked on Suspicion (1945) - The Runt
- Scared Stiff (1945) - Mink
- Boston Blackie's Rendezvous (1945) - The Runt
- Midnight Manhunt (1945) - Joe Wells
- Doll Face (1945) - Stage Manager
- Shock (1946) - Cab Driver (uncredited)
- A Close Call for Boston Blackie (1946) - The Runt
- Sentimental Journey (1946) - Toy Hawker (uncredited)
- The Phantom Thief (1946) - The Runt
- Suspense (1946) - Max
- Boston Blackie and the Law (1946) - The Runt
- Abie's Irish Rose (1946) - Isaac Cohen
- Daisy Kenyon (1947) - Waiter (uncredited)
- Trapped by Boston Blackie (1948) - The Runt
- The Untamed Breed (1948) - Pablo
- Dancing in the Dark (1949) - Film Cutter (uncredited)
- A Girl in Every Port (1952) - Skeezer
- Bloodhounds of Broadway (1952) - Ropes McGonigle
- Tonight We Sing (1953) - Impresario (uncredited)
- Pickup on South Street (1953) - Willie - Police Desk Clerk (uncredited)
- The Robe (1953) - Gracchus (uncredited)
- Combat Squad (1953) - Medic Brown
- The Miami Story (1954) - Louie Mott
- Broken Lance (1954) - Paymaster (uncredited)
- Woman's World (1954) - Executive Reception Guest (uncredited)
- The Steel Cage (1954) - Solly, Convict Chef (segment "The Chef")
- 3 Ring Circus (1954) - Little Boy's Father (uncredited)
- New York Confidential (1955) - Darlene's Agent (uncredited)
- Guys and Dolls (1955) - Society Max
- The Man With the Golden Arm (1955) - Sam Markette
- Alfred Hitchcock Presents (1956) (Season 1 Episode 15: "The Big Switch") - Barney
- The Conqueror (1956) - Sibilant Sam (uncredited)
- Slightly Scarlet (1956) - Roos (uncredited)
- Jungle Hell (1956) - Mr. Trosk
- Superman (1956) (Season 4 Episode 3: "The Big Freeze") as Duke Taylor
- Sierra Stranger (1957) - Barfly Dan
- Calypso Heat Wave (1957) - Books
- The Tijuana Story (1957) - Pino
- The Story of Mankind (1957) - Waiter
- Baby Face Nelson (1957) - Mr. Hall - Bank Manager
- Some Came Running (1958) - Slim (uncredited)
- Night of the Quarter Moon (1959) - Detective (uncredited)
- Some Like It Hot (1959) - "Toothpick" Charlie
- Alias Jesse James (1959) - New York Bar Gibson Girl Fan (uncredited)
- Bells Are Ringing (1960) - Blind Bookie (uncredited)
- Perry Mason (1960) - Court Clerk
- Ocean's 11 (1960) - Proprietor (uncredited)
- Pocketful of Miracles (1961) - Shimkey (uncredited)
