= Walter Sande =

American actor (1906–1972)

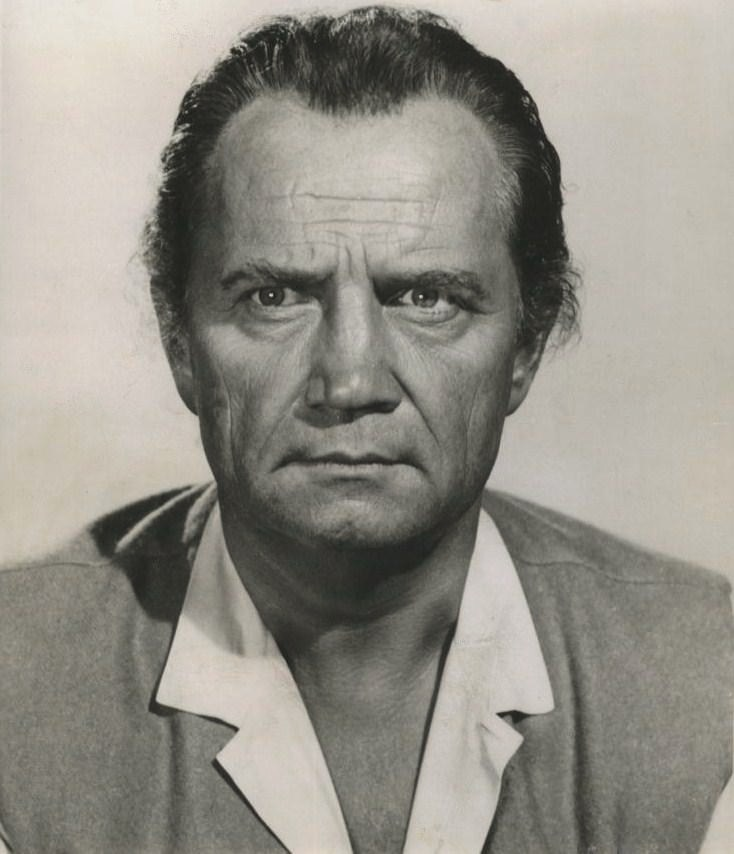
- Walter Sande in Johnny Tremain (1957)
- Born: July 9, 1906; Denver, Colorado, U.S.
- Died: February 22, 1972 (aged 65); Chicago, Illinois, U.S.
- Occupation: Actor
- Years active: 1938–1971

Walter Sande (July 9, 1906 – February 22, 1972) was an American character actor, known for numerous supporting film and television roles.

== Films ==
Born in Denver, Colorado, he was one of those stern, heavyset character actors in Hollywood no person could recognize by name. Sande showed an early interest in music as a youth and by his college years managed to start his own band. This led to a job as musical director for 20th Century-Fox's theater chain, which, in turn, led him to acting in films beginning in 1937. Usually providing atmospheric bits with no billing, he made an initial impression in serial cliffhangers as a third-string heavy with the popular The Green Hornet Strikes Again! and Sky Raiders.

His first top featured role, however, would come with The Iron Claw as Jack "Flash" Strong, a photographer who, uncharacteristically for Walter, served as a comic sidekick to our serial hero. He also had a role in another serial as Red Pennington, the amusing sidekick to Don Winslow of the Navy. He repeated his role again in Don Winslow of the Coast Guard, the successful sequel.

The Pennington role would spark his later career, appearing in, To Have and Have Not, Along Came Jones, The Blue Dahlia, Dark City and Bad Day at Black Rock, amongothers. A regular presence in sci-fi films such as Red Planet Mars, The War of the Worlds and Invaders from Mars, he also had a recurring featured part in the 1940s Boston Blackie film series playing Detective Matthews alongside Chester Morris, former thief-turned-crime hero.

== Television ==
A primary support player during the "Golden Age" of television, Sande worked on nearly every popular western and crime show available in the late 1940s and throughout the 1950s and 1960s, including Johnny Ringo. In 1949, he played Sheriff Taylor in the three-part The Lone Ranger television premiere, as he helped the masked man and Tonto capture the Butch Cavendish gang. He made 15 appearances on Dragnet, starring Jack Webb, usually portraying Chief of Detectives Thad Brown or some other high-ranking LAPD officer. In 1960, he made a guest appearance on Perry Mason as circus co-owner and murder victim Judson Curtis in "The Case of the Clumsy Clown." In 1965, he appeared in the Lost in Space episode "Return from Outer Space" as Sheriff Baxendale.

He had a regular series role on the syndicated The Adventures of Tugboat Annie as Captain Horatio Bullwinkle, Annie's rival, and a recurring one as Lars "Papa" Holstrum, on The Farmer's Daughter. He guest starred on the syndicated adventure series Rescue 8, starring Jim Davis and Lang Jeffries; in David Janssen's CBS crime drama Richard Diamond, Private Detective; on the ABC western series The Rebel, starring Nick Adams; on the CBS military sitcom/drama Hennesey with Jackie Cooper; on the ABC/Warner Brothers western series The Alaskans, starring Roger Moore, and in an episode of the NBC 1960s western series Redigo, starring Richard Egan, and in a 1966 episode of Lassie as store owner Tom of Pine Lake. In 1963 he appeared as Ralph Hayden on the TV western The Rifleman in the episode titled "The Guest." In 1970 he appeared as Graham on the TV western The Virginian in the episode titled "The Mysterious Mr. Tate."

== Personal life and death ==
Sande and his wife, Fran, had two daughters. He died of a heart attack at O'Hare Airport in Chicago, Illinois, on February 22, 1972, at the age of 65.

== Selected filmography ==
=== Films ===
- The Goldwyn Follies (1938) as Westinghouse – Third Auditioning Singer (uncredited)
- Arson Gang Busters (1938) as Oscar
- Ladies in Distress (1938) as Duncan
- Smashing the Rackets (1938) as Hospital Interne (uncredited)
- Army Girl (1938) as Soldier (uncredited)
- Tenth Avenue Kid (1938) as Detective Faber
- Mr. Doodle Kicks Off (1938) as Himself – Student Band Leader (uncredited)
- The Mad Miss Manton (1938) as Jim – Investigator for Peter (uncredited)
- The Great Waltz (1938) as Revolutionary (uncredited)
- The Mysterious Miss X (1939) as Taxi Cab Driver (uncredited)
- The Great Man Votes (1939) as Radio Newscaster in Montage (uncredited)
- Blondie Meets the Boss (1939) as 2nd Mailman (uncredited)
- Missing Daughters (1939) as Snoop (uncredited)
- Good Girls Go to Paris (1939) as Railroad Ticket Agent (uncredited)
- The Man They Could Not Hang (1939) as Reporter at Typewriter (uncredited)
- Those High Grey Walls (1939) as Convict (uncredited)
- A Woman Is the Judge (1939) as Reporter (uncredited)
- Eternally Yours (1939) as Ralph, Gloria's Husband (uncredited)
- Scandal Sheet (1939) as Hurley
- Mr. Smith Goes to Washington (1939) as Newspaperman with Pipe (uncredited)
- Beware Spooks! (1939) as Policeman (uncredited)
- Sued for Libel (1939) as Court Clerk (uncredited)
- Blondie Brings Up Baby (1939) as Policeman (uncredited)
- The Amazing Mr. Williams (1939) as Police Stenographer (uncredited)
- Music in My Heart (1940) as Process Server (uncredited)
- Convicted Woman (1940) as Cop (uncredited)
- Millionaire Playboy (1940) as Worried Pedestrian (uncredited)
- Men Without Souls (1940) as First Reporter
- You Can't Fool Your Wife (1940) as Mr. Gillespie, Jr.
- Pop Always Pays (1940) as Insurance Investigator (uncredited)
- Angels Over Broadway (1940) as Lunch Wagon Counterman (uncredited)
- So You Won't Talk (1940) as Cop (uncredited)
- Sandy Gets Her Man (1940) as Fireman (uncredited)
- Arizona (1940) as Lieutenant Chapin (uncredited)
- Flight Command (1940) as Officer on Downed Seaplane (uncredited)
- The Green Hornet Strikes Again! (1940, Serial) as Thug Boss at Gold Star Warehouse (uncredited)
- Kitty Foyle (1940) as Trumpeter (uncredited)
- Meet Boston Blackie (1941) as Officer at Amusement Park (uncredited)
- Footsteps in the Dark (1941) as Sailor at Burlesque Theater (uncredited)
- Sky Raiders (1941, Serial) as Irene's Pilot-Henchman [Chs. 4–5] (uncredited)
- Citizen Kane (1941) as Reporter at Xanadu (uncredited)
- Adventure in Washington (1941) as Elevator Operator (uncredited)
- Blondie in Society (1941) as Pincus' Dog Handler (uncredited)
- Sweetheart of the Campus (1941) as Football Player (uncredited)
- Sergeant York (1941) as Sergeant on March (uncredited)
- Parachute Battalion (1941) as Medical Officer
- The Iron Claw (1941, serial) as Jack 'Flash' Strong
- Mystery Ship (1941) as Sailor (uncredited)
- Down in San Diego (1941) as Sergeant (uncredited)
- Navy Blues (1941) as Marine Military Policeman (uncredited)
- Great Guns (1941) as Blue Army Soldier Capturing Stan and Ollie (uncredited)
- Secrets of the Lone Wolf (1941) as Squad Car Officer (uncredited)
- Sing for Your Supper (1941) as Irv (uncredited)
- Confessions of Boston Blackie (1941) as Detective Mathews
- Sealed Lips (1942) as Investigator Gene Blake
- Freckles Comes Home (1942) as "Muggsy" Dolan, aka Jack Leach
- Don Winslow of the Navy (1942) as Lt. Red Pennington
- Blue, White and Perfect (1942) as Sailor Carson (uncredited)
- The Bugle Sounds (1942) as Headquarters Sergeant (uncredited)
- Jail House Blues (1942) as Fudge (uncredited)
- To the Shores of Tripoli (1942) as Pharmacist's Mate (uncredited)
- Two Yanks in Trinidad (1942) as Soldier (uncredited)
- Alias Boston Blackie (1942) as Detective Mathews
- Tramp, Tramp, Tramp! (1942) as Guard (uncredited)
- Who Is Hope Schuyler? (1942) as Chauffeur (uncredited)
- Sweetheart of the Fleet (1942) as Daffy Dill
- Tortilla Flat (1942) as Cannery Foreman (uncredited)
- Wings for the Eagle (1942) as Lockheed Worker Getting Parts (uncredited)
- Priorities on Parade (1942) as Bus Driver (uncredited)
- Timber (1942) as Sandy
- A-Haunting We Will Go (1942) as Expressman (uncredited)
- Berlin Correspondent (1942) as Red – Reporter (uncredited)
- Iceland (1942) as Marine (uncredited)
- The War Against Mrs. Hadley (1942) as War Department Desk Clerk (uncredited)
- My Sister Eileen (1942) as Jackson – Policeman (uncredited)
- Highways by Night (1942) as Lippy Hogan (uncredited)
- Boston Blackie Goes Hollywood (1942) as Detective Sergeant Mathews (uncredited)
- Commandos Strike at Dawn (1942) as Otto – German Soldier (uncredited)
- Air Force (1943) as Joe – Mechanic at Clark Field (uncredited)
- Reveille with Beverly (1943) as Pvt. Puckett aka Canvassback
- The Purple V (1943) as Otto Horner
- Salute for Three (1943) as Sailor (uncredited)
- After Midnight with Boston Blackie (1943) as Det. Sgt. Mathews (uncredited)
- Slightly Dangerous (1943) as Reporter (uncredited)
- He Hired the Boss (1943) as Marine (uncredited)
- Don Winslow of the Coast Guard (1943) as Lt. 'Red' Pennington
- Taxi, Mister (1943) as Police Detective (uncredited)
- They Came to Blow Up America (1943) as Coast Guard Desk Chief (uncredited)
- Corvette K-225 (1943) as Evans
- Son of Dracula (1943) as Mac, Deputy (uncredited)
- The Chance of a Lifetime (1943) as Detective Sgt. Matthews (uncredited)
- Gung Ho! (1943) as McBride
- A Guy Named Joe (1943) as Sande – Mess Sergeant (uncredited)
- This Is the Life (1944) as Joe (uncredited)
- Henry Aldrich's Little Secret (1944) as Newspaper Reporter (uncredited)
- I Love a Soldier (1944) as Sgt. Lionel 'Stiff' Banks
- The Singing Sheriff (1944) as Butch
- To Have and Have Not (1944) as Johnson
- Along Came Jones (1945) as Ira Waggoner
- What Next, Corporal Hargrove? (1945) as Maj. Kingby
- The Daltons Ride Again (1945) as Wilkins
- The Spider (1945) as Det. Lt. Walter Castle
- The Blue Dahlia (1946) as Heath
- No Leave, No Love (1946) as Sledgehammer
- Nocturne (1946) as Halberson
- The Red House (1947) as Don Brent (uncredited)
- The Woman on the Beach (1947) as Otto Wernecke
- Wild Harvest (1947) as Long
- Christmas Eve (1947) as Mario's Hood
- Killer McCoy (1947) as Bill Thorne
- The Prince of Thieves (1948) as Little John (uncredited)
- Perilous Waters (1948) as Franklin
- Half Past Midnight (1948) as Det. Lt. MacDonald
- Wallflower (1948) as Police Officer (uncredited)
- Blonde Ice (1948) as Hack Doyle
- Miss Mink of 1949 (1949) as Sean O'Mulvaney
- Bad Boy (1949) as Texas Oil Man (uncredited)
- Tucson (1949) as George Reeves
- Canadian Pacific (1949) as Mike Brannigan
- Rim of the Canyon (1949) as Jake Fargo
- Joe Palooka in the Counterpunch (1949) as Austin
- Strange Bargain (1949) as Sgt. Cord
- Dakota Lil (1950) as Butch Cassidy
- The Kid from Texas (1950) as Crowe
- A Woman of Distinction (1950) as Charlie – Motorcycle Cop (uncredited)
- 711 Ocean Drive (1950) as Auto Repair Mechanic (uncredited)
- Dark City (1950) as Swede
- The Du Pont Story (1950) as Tom Cooper
- Call Me Mister (1951) as Military Policeman #106 (uncredited)
- Payment on Demand (1951) as Swanson
- Rawhide (1951) as Flowers (uncredited)
- A Place in the Sun (1951) as Art Jansen – George's Attorney
- Fort Worth (1951) as Deputy Waller
- The Basketball Fix (1951) as Nat Becker
- Warpath (1951) as Sgt. Parker
- Tomorrow Is Another Day (1951) as Sheriff
- The Racket (1951) as Precinct Sgt. Jim Delaney
- Red Mountain (1951) as Benjie
- I Want You (1951) as Ned Iverson
- Mutiny (1952) as Mr. Stone, USN (uncredited)
- Red Planet Mars (1952) as Admiral Bill Carey
- The Duel at Silver Creek (1952) as Pete Fargo
- The Steel Trap (1952) as Customs Inspector
- Bomba and the Jungle Girl (1952) as Mr. Ward
- The Legend of the Lone Ranger (1952) as Sheriff Taylor
- The War of the Worlds (1953) as Sheriff Bogany (uncredited)
- Invaders from Mars (1953) as Police Desk Sgt. Finlay (uncredited)
- Powder River (1953) as Sam Harris
- The Great Sioux Uprising (1953) as Joe Baird
- The Kid from Left Field (1953) as Barnes
- A Blueprint for Murder (1953) as Dist. Atty. John J. Henderson (uncredited)
- Overland Pacific (1954) as Mr. Dennison
- Apache (1954) as Lt. Col. Beck
- Bad Day at Black Rock (1955) as Sam
- Wichita (1955) as Clint Wallace
- Texas Lady (1955) as Whit Sturdy
- Anything Goes (1956) as Alex Todd
- The Maverick Queen (1956) as Sheriff Wilson
- Canyon River (1956) as Maddox
- Gun Brothers (1956) as Yellowstone Kelly
- Drango (1957) as Dr. Blair
- The Iron Sheriff (1957) as Marshal Ellison
- Johnny Tremain (1957) as Paul Revere
- Last Train from Gun Hill (1959) as Sheriff Bartlett
- Oklahoma Territory (1960) as Marshal Pete Rosslyn
- Noose for a Gunman (1960) as Marshal Tom Evans
- The Gallant Hours (1960) as Capt. Horace Keys
- Sunrise at Campobello (1960) as Capt. Skinner
- The Quick Gun (1964) as Tom Morrison
- Young Dillinger (1965) as Judge
- I'll Take Sweden (1965) as Bjork
- The Navy vs. the Night Monsters (1966) as Dr. Arthur Beecham
- Death of a Gunfighter (1969) as Paul Hammond
- Cold Turkey (1971) as Tobacco Executive

=== Television ===
- Public Prosecutor (14 episodes, 1947–1951) as Lt. Evans
- The Lone Ranger (7 episodes, 1949–1952)
- Four Star Playhouse (4 episodes, 1952–1956)
- Zane Grey Theatre (7 episodes, 1956–1961)
- The Adventures of Tugboat Annie (26 episodes, 1957–1958) as Captain Horatio Bullwinkle
- Tales of Wells Fargo (3 episodes, 1957–1960)
- Wanted: Dead or Alive (3 episodes, 1959–1960) – featured in 1 episode as Pat Garrett
- Laramie (5 episodes, 1959–1962))
- Maverick (S4 E29 "Substitute Gun") as Sheriff Coleman
- Death Valley Days (3 episodes, 1960–1965)
- Gunsmoke (7 episodes, 1961–1971)
- The Dick Powell Theatre (S1, E22 "The Legend," February 20, 1962) as Al Cooper
- Bonanza (4 episodes, 1962–1969)
- Lost in Space (S1, E15 "Return from Outer Space") as Sheriff George Baxendale
- That Girl (pilot episode, 1966) as Max Cochran – appeared a year later in a reworked version of the pilot episode
- Lassie (S12, E18 "The Town That Wouldn't Die," January 16, 1966) as store owner Tom
- The Wild Wild West (3 episodes, 1967) as Colonel Crockett
- Rango (S1, E9 "My Teepee Runneth Over," March 10, 1967) as Sheriff
- Bewitched (S4, E21 "Hippie Hippie Hooray," February 1, 1968) as Giddings
- The Doris Day Show (4 episodes, 1968–1971)
- Michael O'Hara the Fourth (1972, TV movie) as John Parsons (posthumously released)
