= Boston Blackie (radio series) =

American radio detective drama

Boston Blackie is an American old-time radio detective drama. It was broadcast on NBC June 23, 1944 – September 15, 1944, and later was syndicated.

== Overview ==
The Boston Blackie radio program was an adaptation of the Boston Blackie stories written by Jack Boyle. Blackie was a reformed criminal who devoted his efforts to catching criminals. The opening of each episode describe him as "enemy to those who make him an enemy — friend to those who have no friend". Characters heard regularly on the show were Blackie, Mary Wesley (his girlfriend), and police inspector Faraday. Media critic John Crosby wrote that Blackie had "no visible means of support" and that "He solves crimes apparently more for the fun of it than for sordid cash."

=== NBC version ===
Boston Blackie debuted on radio on June 23, 1944, as a summer replacement for NBC's Amos 'n' Andy. Chester Morris portrayed Blackie, and Richard Lane played Inspector Farraday, as they did in the Blackie films. Mary was portrayed by Lesley Woods. The announcer was Harlow Wilcox, and Milton and Barbara Merlin were the writers. The sponsor was Rinso soap. The show was broadcast on Fridays at 10 p.m., Eastern Time. It ended on September 15, 1944.

==== Episodes ====
Partial List of Episodes of Boston Blackie
Date	Episode
June 23, 1944	"The Jonathan Diamond"
June 30, 1944	"The Manletter Bank Case"
July 7, 1944	"The Canteen Fund Mystery"
July 14, 1944	"Star of the Nile"
July 21, 1944	"Black Market Blackie"
July 28, 1944	"The Davon Caretaker Murder"
August 4, 1944	"Spy Ring"
August 11, 1944	("The Missing String of Pearls") "The Univited Corpse"

=== Syndicated version ===
On April 25, 1945, Boston Blackie returned to radio via syndication. Produced by Frederick Ziv's company, it lasted for 220 episodes. The cast was different from the NBC version, with Richard Kollmar as Blackie, Maurice Tarplin as Farraday, and Jan Miner as Mary.

By November 1945, Boston Blackie was running on 52-week contracts on some stations, including WJZ in New York and WTMJ in Milwaukee. By October 1950 the program was broadcast on 273 stations.

== Critical response ==
Tim DeForest wrote in the book Radio by the Book: Adaptations of Literature and Fiction on the Airwaves that writers were so focused on establishing characters and ambience that many of the plots in the NBC version had illogical portions; writers were "so determined to show us how clever Blackie is that they sacrificed basic story construction along the way." However, the syndicated version was "consistently well-written".
