= Sy Bartlett =

American writer (1900–1978)

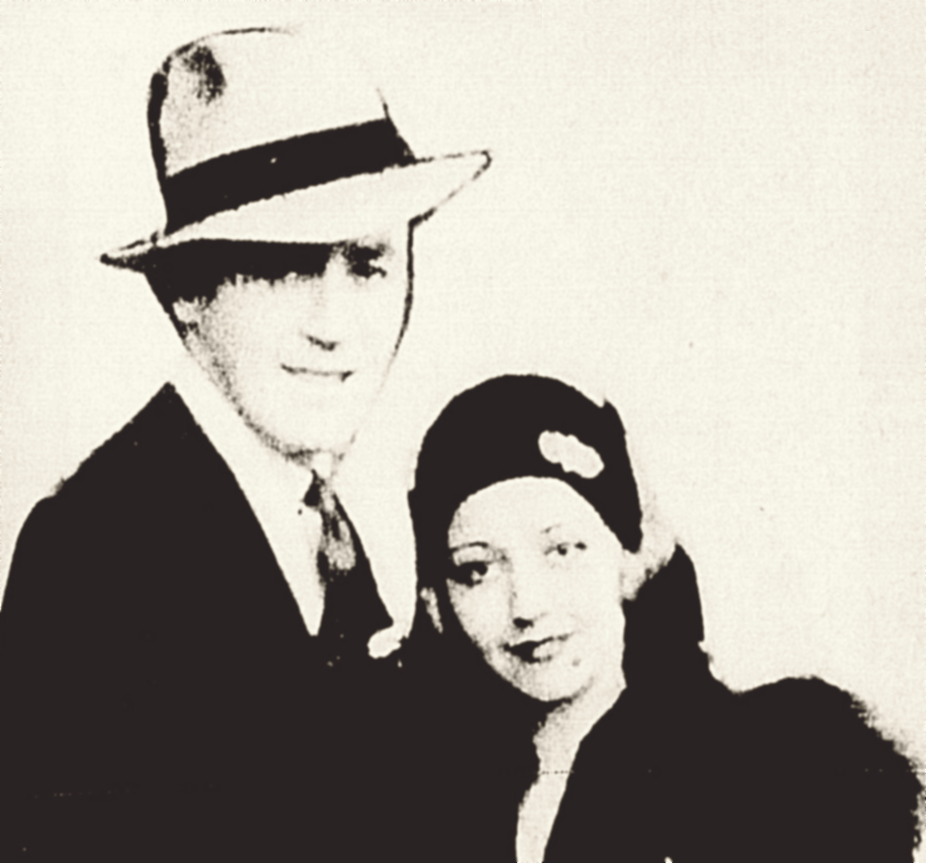
- Sy Bartlett and Alice White 1931.
- Born: Sacha Baraniev; July 10, 1900; Mykolaiv, Russian Empire (now Ukraine)
- Died: May 29, 1978 (aged 77); Hollywood, California, United States
- Occupations: Author, screenwriter, producer of Hollywood films

Sidney Bartlett (July 10, 1900 – May 29, 1978, born Sacha Baraniev) (Note: Ukrainian: Саша Баранєв, romanized: Sasha Baraniev) was a Ukrainian-American author and screenwriter and producer of Hollywood films.

== Early life ==
Sy Bartlett was born Sacha Baraniev on July 10, 1900, in the Black Sea seaport of Mykolaiv in the Russian Empire (now Ukraine). His parents immigrated to the United States in 1904, settling in Chicago. Bartlett attended Northwestern University and was trained at the Medill School of Journalism.

He worked as a newspaper reporter before moving to Hollywood to become a screenwriter. His first credited work was for RKO Studios in 1933 and he wrote 28 screenplays from 1933 to 1969. In the 1950s, he became interested in producing films, and with film star Gregory Peck founded Melville Productions in 1956.

Bartlett enjoyed being a Hollywood socialite in the 1930s and was well known for the Sunday barbecues he frequently hosted. He was sometimes connected by tabloids to scandals on occasion, and married three times, each time to Hollywood actresses – Alice White, Ellen Drew, and Patricia Owens. Of Jewish descent, Bartlett was strongly anti-Nazi, once striking an employee of the German consulate in the face during an argument in a nightclub.

== Military service ==
Bartlett joined the U.S. Army during World War II as a captain and was assigned to the Army Pictorial Service. However, he was not interested in making training films and used connections to meet Beirne Lay, Jr., who was on the staff of Army Air Forces Brig. Gen. Ira Eaker. Lay had a background in both journalism and Hollywood and arranged for Bartlett to meet Maj. Gen. Carl Spaatz, and Bartlett became Spaatz's aide-de-camp.

With the establishment of the Eighth Air Force in England, Bartlett was transferred there and joined the staff of the Eighth's Bomber Command as an intelligence assistant. There he came into daily contact with the inner workings of Air Force commanders in England, including Brig. Gen. Frank A. Armstrong, and was a close observer of the development of the Eighth into a powerful combat force. In November 1944, Major Bartlett became the wing intelligence officer for the B-29 315th Bomb Wing under Armstrong and served with it in Guam. Bartlett also served as a bombardier flying in the first bombing mission over Berlin in March 1943.

== Return to Hollywood and writing ==
Following World War II, Bartlett returned to Hollywood and joined 20th Century Fox as a writer. In 1946, he began a collaboration with Beirne Lay which resulted in the 1948 publication of the novel Twelve O'Clock High (Harper & Brothers), and in December 1949, the release of the film based on the same story (work on production began a year before publication).

Bartlett died in Hollywood on May 29, 1978, aged 77, from cancer.

== Filmography (screenwriter) ==
- Che! (1969) – also producer
- In Enemy Country (1968)
- A Gathering of Eagles (1963)-- also producer
- Cape Fear (1962)--also producer
- The Outsider (1961) – also producer
- Beloved Infidel (1959)
- Pork Chop Hill (1959)-- only producer
- The Big Country (1958)
- Suspicion (TV series; episode: "Doomsday") (1957)
- The Last Command (1955)
- That Lady (1955)-- also producer
- The Red Beret (1953)
- Twelve O'Clock High (1949)
- Down to the Sea in Ships (1949)
- 13 Rue Madeleine (1947)
- The Princess and the Pirate (1944)
- Two Yanks in Trinidad (1942)
- Bullet Scars (1942)
- Road to Zanzibar (1941)
- Sandy Gets Her Man (1940)
- The Amazing Mr. Williams (1939)
- Cocoanut Grove (1938)
- Sergeant Murphy (1938)
- Danger Patrol (1937)
- The Man Who Cried Wolf (1937)
- Under Your Spell (1936)
- Boulder Dam (1936)
- The Murder of Dr. Harrigan (1936)
- Going Highbrow (1935)
- Kansas City Princess (1934)
- The Big Brain (1933)
