= Lloyd Corrigan =

American actor (1900–1969)

- Corrigan in Happy, 1960
- Born: October 16, 1900; San Francisco, California, U.S.
- Died: November 5, 1969 (aged 69); Los Angeles, California, U.S.
- Occupations: Actor; producer; screenwriter; director
- Years active: 1925–1967
- Parent(s): James Corrigan; Lillian Elliott

Lloyd Corrigan (October 16, 1900 – November 5, 1969) was an American actor, producer, screenwriter, and director who began working in films in the 1920s. The son of actor James Corrigan and actress Lillian Elliott, Corrigan directed films, usually mysteries such as Daughter of the Dragon starring Anna May Wong (one of a trilogy of Fu Manchu movies for which he has writing credits), before dedicating himself more to acting in 1938. His short La Cucaracha won an Academy Award in 1935.

== Early life ==
Corrigan was born in San Francisco, California, to actress Lillian Hiby Corrigan (Lillian Elliott) (April 24, 1874 – January 15, 1959) and actor James Corrigan (October 17, 1867 – February 28, 1929).

== Career ==
Corrigan studied drama at the University of California, Berkeley, from which he graduated in 1922.

=== Directing (1930–1937) ===
Follow Thru (1930) to Lady Behave! (1937).

=== Writing (1926–1939) ===
Hands Up! (1926) to Night Work (1939)

=== Acting (1925–1927, 1939–1966) ===
Corrigan's early roles: The Splendid Crime (1925), It (1927). Corrigan played both romantic leads and villains throughout his career. He also appeared in a number of Boston Blackie films as millionaire Arthur Manleder. He starred with Roy Acuff and William Frawley in the 1949 film, My Home in San Antone. In the 1950 film, Cyrano de Bergerac, he played Ragueneau, the lovable pastry cook, though in this version the role is partially combined with that of Ligniere, the drunken poet, who is omitted from the film.

Corrigan continued acting in films until the middle 1960s. He appeared on dozens of television programs, such as the uncle of Corky played by Darlene Gillespie in the Mickey Mouse Club serial, "Corky and White Shadow." He also appeared in two episodes of the NBC Western, The Restless Gun with John Payne.

He was cast on ABC's religion anthology series, Crossroads. He appeared in the role of Wally Dippel in ABC's The Adventures of Ozzie and Harriet, in the syndicated crime drama, City Detective, with Rod Cameron, and on the television version of How to Marry a Millionaire, with Barbara Eden and Merry Anders. He appeared on NBC's Johnny Staccato with John Cassavetes, and the syndicated Western, Man Without a Gun, starring Rex Reason and Mort Mills. Six times Corrigan portrayed the Western author Ned Buntline in ABC's The Life and Legend of Wyatt Earp. He also guest starred on the CBS sitcom, Dennis the Menace, with Jay North in the series lead.

In 1959, Corrigan was cast as John Jenkins, with Anne Baxter as Ellie Jenkins, in the episode "A Race to Cincinnati" of the NBC Western series, Riverboat, starring Darren McGavin and Burt Reynolds. In the story line, three ruthless men try to prevent a peach farmer from getting his crop to market so that he cannot make the last payment on his valuable land, which he will otherwise forfeit.

Corrigan appeared twice on the syndicated Western anthology series, Death Valley Days. He was cast as the lucky hobo Carl Herman in the 1960 episode, "Money to Burn". Helen Kleeb played a recipient of Herman's largess. Paul Sorensen and William Boyett played the thieves whose $50,000 Herman found and gave away. In 1962, Corrigan played Dorsey Bilger, the bearer of tall tales in Totem, Idaho, in the 1962 episode, "A Sponge Full of Vinegar". In the story line, the townspeople have begun to tire of Bilger's stories. The episode also featured Chris Alcaide as Charlie Winslow and Paul Birch as Sheriff Lick.

From 1960 to 1961, Corrigan appeared as a series regular, Uncle Charlie, in the NBC sitcom Happy. He made guest appearances on CBS's Perry Mason in 1962 as Rudy in "The Case of the Dodging Domino," in 1963 as land financier/murderer Harvey Forrest in "The Case of the Decadent Dean," and in 1965 as attorney Gerald Shore in "The Case of the Careless Kitten". In 1963, Corrigan portrayed Captain Rembrandt Van Creel in "The Day of the Flying Dutchman" on ABC's Western series, The Travels of Jaimie McPheeters, starring child actor Kurt Russell. Dehl Berti portrayed the Indian, Little Buffalo. From 1965 to 1966, Corrigan appeared in the NBC TV sitcom Hank as Professor McKillup.

== Complete filmography ==
=== As actor ===
- The Splendid Crime (1925) as Kelly
- It (1927) as Yacht Cabin Boy (uncredited)
- The Great Commandment (1939) as Jemuel
- High School (1940) as Dr. Henry Wallace
- Young Tom Edison (1940) as Dr. Pender
- Jack Pot (1940 short) as Mr. Higby (uncredited)
- Two Girls on Broadway (1940) as Judge
- Opened by Mistake (1940) as Anton Zarecki (uncredited)
- The Ghost Breakers (1940) as Martin
- Queen of the Mob (1940) as C. Jason - Photographer
- Sporting Blood (1940) as Otis Winfield
- The Lady in Question (1940) as Prosecuting Attorney
- The Return of Frank James (1940) as Randolph Stone
- Captain Caution (1940) as Capt. Stannage
- Public Deb No. 1 (1940) as Hugh Stackett
- Dark Streets of Cairo (1940) as Baron Stephens
- A Girl, a Guy and a Gob (1941) as Pigeon Duncan
- Men of Boys Town (1941) as Roger Gorton
- Whistling in the Dark (1941) as Harvey Upshaw
- The Mexican Spitfire's Baby (1941) as Chumley
- Confessions of Boston Blackie (1941) as Arthur Manleder
- Kathleen (1941) as Dr. Montague Foster
- Bombay Clipper (1942) as George Lewis
- Treat 'Em Rough (1942) as Gray Kingsford
- North to the Klondike (1942) as Doctor Curtis
- The Great Man's Lady (1942) as Mr. Cadwallader
- Alias Boston Blackie (1942) as Arthur Manleder
- The Mystery of Marie Roget (1942) as Prefect Gobelin
- The Wife Takes a Flyer (1942) as Thomas Woverman
- The Great Man's Lady (1942) as Mr. Cadwallader
- Maisie Gets Her Man (1942) as Mr. Marshall J. Denningham
- Eyes of the Underworld (1942) as J.C. Thomas
- Boston Blackie Goes Hollywood (1942) as Arthur Manleder
- Lucky Jordan (1942) as Ernest Higgins
- Secrets of the Underground (1942) as Maurice Vaughn
- Tennessee Johnson (1942) as Mr. Secretary
- Hitler's Children (1943) as Franz Erhart
- London Blackout Murders (1943) as Inspector Harris
- After Midnight with Boston Blackie (1943) as Arthur Manleder
- King of the Cowboys (1943) as William Kraley - Governor's Secretary
- The Mantrap (1943) as Anatol Duprez
- Captive Wild Woman (1943) as John Whipple
- Stage Door Canteen (1943) as Lloyd Corrigan
- Nobody's Darling (1943) as Charles Grant Sr.
- The Chance of a Lifetime (1943, a Boston Blackie film) as Arthur Manleder
- Tarzan's Desert Mystery (1943) as Sheik Abdul El Khim
- Passport to Destiny (1944) as Prof. Frederick Walthers
- Rosie the Riveter (1944) as Clem Prouty
- Gambler's Choice (1944) as Ulysses Sylvester Rogers
- The Adventures of Mark Twain (1944) as Town Citizen (uncredited)
- Goodnight, Sweetheart (1944) as Police Chief Davis
- Since You Went Away (1944) as Mr. Mahoney - Grocer
- Song of Nevada (1944) as Professor Hanley
- Reckless Age (1944) as Mr. Connors
- Lights of Old Santa Fe (1944) as Marty Maizely
- The Thin Man Goes Home (1944) as Dr. Bruce Clayworth
- Lake Placid Serenade (1944) as Jaroslaw 'Papa' Haschek
- What a Blonde (1945) as Employment Agency Clerk (uncredited)
- Bring on the Girls (1945) as Beaster
- The Crime Doctor's Courage (1945) as John Massey
- Boston Blackie Booked on Suspicion (1945) as Arthur Manleder
- The Fighting Guardsman (1946) as King Louis XVI
- The Bandit of Sherwood Forest (1945) as Sheriff of Nottingham
- She-Wolf of London (1946) as Detective Latham
- Two Smart People (1946) as Dwight Chadwick
- Shadowed (1946) as Fred J. Johnson
- Lady Luck (1946) as Little Joe
- The Chase (1946) as Emmerrich Johnson
- Alias Mr. Twilight (1946) as Geoffrey Holden
- The Ghost Goes Wild (1947) as The Late Timothy Beecher
- Stallion Road (1947) as Ben Otis
- Blaze of Noon (1947) as Reverend Polly
- Adventures of Casanova (1948) as D'Albernasi
- The Bride Goes Wild (1948) as "Pops"
- The Big Clock (1948) as McKinley
- Mr. Reckless (1948) as Hugo Denton
- A Date with Judy (1948) as "Pop" Sam Scully
- The Return of October (1948) as Attorney Dutton
- Strike It Rich (1948) as Matt Brady
- Homicide for Three (1948) as Emmanuel Catt
- Home in San Antone (1949) as Uncle Zeke Tinker
- The Girl from Jones Beach (1949) as Mr. Evergood
- Blondie Hits the Jackpot (1949) as J.B. Hutchins
- Dancing in the Dark (1949) as John Barker
- And Baby Makes Three (1949) as Dr. William M. "Uncle Bill" Parnell
- When Willie Comes Marching Home (1950) as Maj. Adams
- Father Is a Bachelor (1950) as Judge Millett
- My Friend Irma Goes West (1950) as Sharpie Corrigan
- Cyrano de Bergerac (1950) as Ragueneau
- Sierra Passage (1950) as Thaddeus 'Thad' Kring
- The Last Outpost (1951) as Mr. Delacourt
- Ghost Chasers (1951) as Edgar Alden Franklin Smith
- Her First Romance (1951) as Mr. Gauss, School Principal
- New Mexico (1951) as Judge Wilcox
- Son of Paleface (1952) as Doc Lovejoy
- Rainbow 'Round My Shoulder (1952) as Tobias, aka Toby
- The Stars Are Singing (1953) as Miller
- Marry Me Again (1953) as Mr. Taylor
- Born in Freedom: The Story of Colonel Drake (1954 short) as Doctor Brewer
- The Bowery Boys Meet the Monsters (1954) as Anton Gravesend
- Return from the Sea (1954) as Pinky
- Paris Follies of 1956 (1955) as Alfred Gaylord
- Hidden Guns (1956) as Judge Wallis
- The Restless Gun (1959) in Episode "The Lady and the Gun"
- Joyful Hour (1960, TV Movie) as Innkeeper
- The Manchurian Candidate (1962) as Holborn Gaines
- Maverick (1962) in Episode “The Maverick Report” as Senator Porter
- Swingin' Together (1963, TV Movie) as Mr. Craig (uncredited)
- It's a Mad, Mad, Mad, Mad World (1963) as the mayor of Santa Rosita
- Lassie: A Christmas Tail (1963) as Mr. Nicholson

=== As director ===
- Follow Thru (1930) (co-director, also uncredited screenwriter)
- Along Came Youth (1930) (co-director)
- Daughter of the Dragon (1931) (also screenwriter)
- The Beloved Bachelor (1931)
- No One Man (1932)
- The Broken Wing (1932)
- He Learned About Women (1932) (also screenwriter)
- La Cucaracha (1934 short)
- By Your Leave (1934)
- Murder on a Honeymoon (1934)
- Dancing Pirate (1936)
- Night Key (1937)
- Lady Behave! (1937 or 1938)

=== As writer ===
- Hands Up! (1926)
- Miss Brewster's Millions (1926)
- Wet Paint (1926)
- The Campus Flirt (1926)
- Senorita (1927)
- Wedding Bills (1927)
- Swim Girl, Swim (1927)
- She's a Sheik (1927)
- Red Hair (1928)
- The Fifty-Fifty Girl (1928)
- Hot News (1928)
- What a Night! (1928) (story)
- The Mysterious Dr. Fu Manchu (1928)
- The Saturday Night Kid (1929)
- Sweetie (1929)
- The Return of Dr. Fu Manchu (1930)
- Anybody's War (1930)
- Follow Thru (1930) (uncredited) (also co-director)
- Dude Ranch (1931)
- The Lawyer's Secret (1931)
- Daughter of the Dragon (1931) (also director)
- He Learned About Women (1933) (story) (also director)
- La Cucaracha (1934 short) (story) (also director)
- That Navy Spirit (1937)
- Campus Confessions (1938) (also story)
- Touchdown, Army (1938)
- Night Work (1939)

== For TV ==
- Willy (1954–1955), regular cast member as Papa Dodger
- Corky and White Shadow A Mickey Mouse Club serial - 17 episodes, (January–February, 1956) as Uncle Dan
- The Real McCoys (1958) as Hank Johnson, a new neighbor who defies Amos's class prejudices, and (1962) as Herbert Bentley, a businessman who rents the McCoys' roadside stand.
- Happy (1960–1961), regular cast member as Uncle Charlie Dooley
- Father Knows Best as Myron, one of Jim's insured who has a car accident with Cornell Wilde who was the guest star.
- My Three Sons (1961) as Smitty, one of Bub's card playing mates.
- Rawhide (1961) – Simon Baines in S3:E25, "Incident of the Running Man"
- Perry Mason Episode: "The Case of the Dodging Domino" (1962) as Rudy Mahlsted
- Perry Mason Episode: "The Case of the Decadent Dean" (1963) as Harvey Forrest
- Gunsmoke "The Magician" (1963) as Jeremiah
- Bonanza (1964–1965) as Jesse Simmons / Doctor, 2 episodes
- Hank (NBC 1965–66) as Professor McKillup
