= The Face in the Fog =

1922 film by Alan Crosland

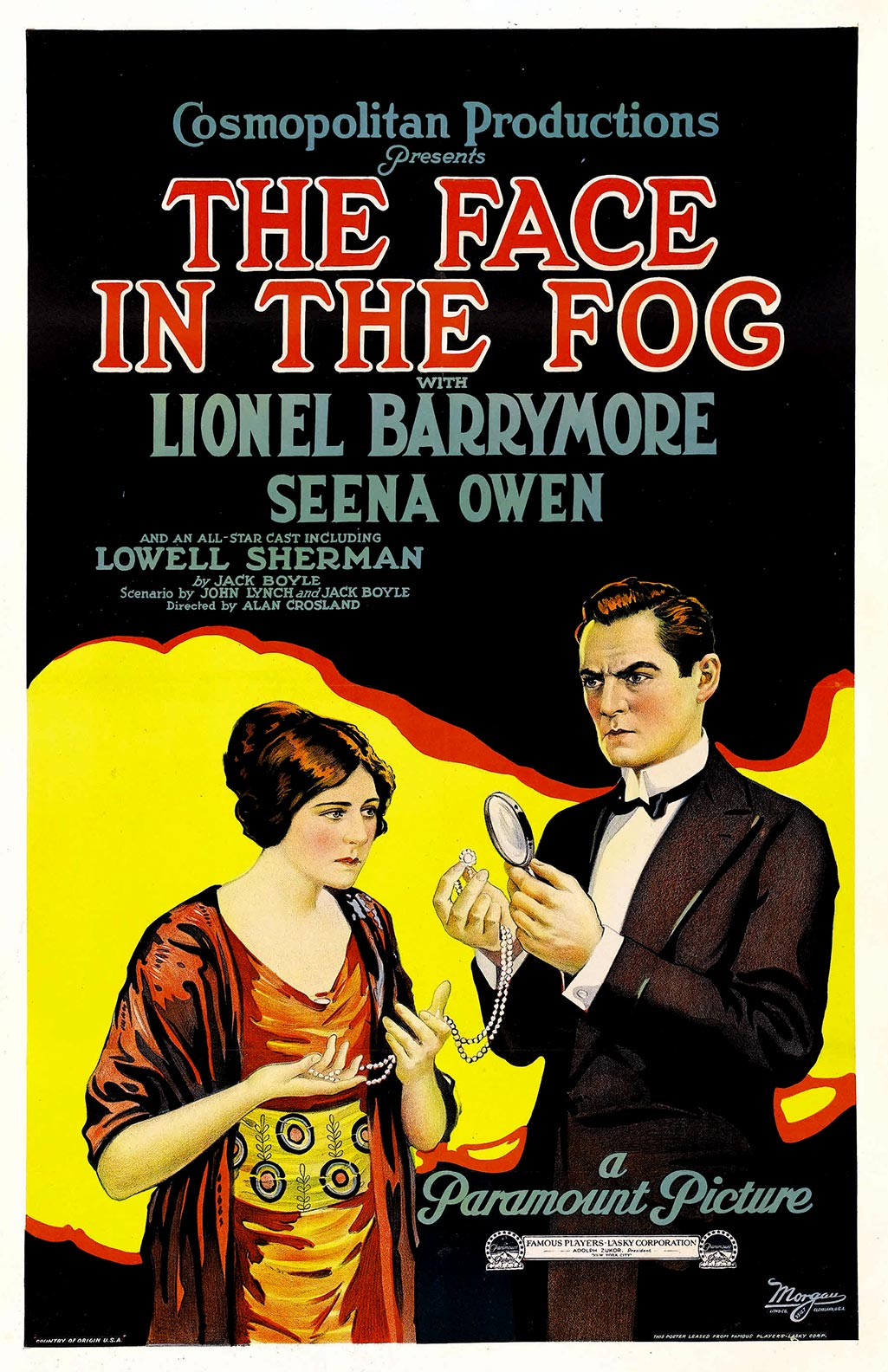
- Directed by: Alan Crosland
- Written by: John Lynch (scenario); Jack Boyle (scenario)
- Based on: Boston Blackie by Jack Boyle
- Produced by: William Randolph Hearst (for Cosmopolitan Productions)
- Starring: Lionel Barrymore; Seena Owen
- Cinematography: Ira H. Morgan; Harold Wenstrom
- Distributed by: Paramount Pictures
- Release date: October 8, 1922
- Running time: 70 minutes; 7 reels (6,095 ft)
- Country: United States
- Language: Silent (English intertitles)

The Face in the Fog is a 1922 American silent film produced by Cosmopolitan Productions and distributed by Paramount Pictures. It was directed by Alan Crosland and starred Lionel Barrymore as detective Boston Blackie. An incomplete print is preserved at the Library of Congress.

== Plot ==
The film is about the efforts of a group of Russian criminals to steal jewels from a Duchess.

== Cast ==
- Lionel Barrymore as Boston Blackie Dawson
- Seena Owen as Grand Duchess Tatiana
- Lowell Sherman as Count Alexis Orloff
- George Nash as Huck Kant
- Louis Wolheim as Petrus
- Mary MacLaren as Mary Dawson
- Macey Harlam as Count Ivan
- Gustav von Seyffertitz as Michael
- Joe King as Detective Wren
- Tom Blake as Surtep
- Marie Burke as Olga
- Joseph W. Smiley as Police Captain
- Martin Faust as Ivan's valet
- Mario Majeroni as Grand Duke Alexis
