= Confessions of Boston Blackie =

1941 film

- Film poster
- Directed by: Edward Dmytryk
- Written by: Jack Boyle; Paul Yawitz; Jay Dratler
- Produced by: William Berke
- Starring: Chester Morris; Harriet Hilliard; Richard Lane; George E. Stone
- Cinematography: Philip Tannura
- Edited by: Gene Milford
- Music by: M. W. Stoloff
- Distributed by: Columbia Pictures
- Release date: December 8, 1941
- Running time: 65 minutes
- Country: United States
- Language: English

Confessions of Boston Blackie is a 1941 American mystery crime film directed by Edward Dmytryk and starring Chester Morris, Harriet Hilliard and Richard Lane. A woman consigns a family heirloom to a pair of unscrupulous art dealers in order to raise money to help her sick brother. This film is the second in the series of 14 Columbia Pictures Boston Blackie films, all starring Morris as the reformed crook. It was preceded by Meet Boston Blackie (1941) and followed by Alias Boston Blackie (1942).

== Plot ==
Diane Parrish is impatient for the sale of her statue of Augustus Caesar, as she needs the money to help her sick brother. Joe Buchanan, one of the art dealers handling the auction, asks her to stay away, claiming that an emotional attachment to the work might cause her to make a scene. She shows up anyway, and notices that the statue is not hers, but a fake. When Buchanan pulls out a gun to silence her, Boston Blackie spots him and fires his own pistol. Parrish is only grazed, but Buchanan accidentally kills his partner and the replica's sculptor, Eric Allison.

When Police Inspector Farraday arrives, he automatically assumes that Blackie is guilty and takes him into custody. Buchanan hides in the hollow fake statue. Then when the coast is clear, he puts Allison's body (and the incriminating bullet) inside and makes his escape. The replica is purchased by Blackie's wealthy friend, Arthur Manleder. Despite lacking a corpse, Farraday keeps Blackie in jail, but not for long. Blackie switches places with an ice cream man and escapes.

He goes to see Diane in the hospital to obtain information. To get in undetected, he once again appropriates the unlucky ice cream man's uniform and pretends to be Diane's doctor. When he learns why she needs the money so badly, he arranges for his assistant, the "Runt", to masquerade as an insurance adjuster to give her $6000 he borrowed from Manleder. The money had initially been intended to pay off a blackmailing Mona, who claims she is Blackie's wife. When Mona shows up and demands the money, Diane realizes that Blackie is her benefactor.

Buchanan arranges to buy the statue from an unsuspecting Manleder. Blackie learns about it, and sees a way to unravel the mystery. He follows the movers back to their lair. Sneaking inside, he overpowers Caulder, one of Buchanan's henchmen. However, Buchanan returns, with Diane as his prisoner, resulting in a Mexican standoff. Meanwhile, both Manleder and the Runt are picked up by the police. Farraday has them released, hoping they will lead him to their friend. The Runt is too experienced to be taken in, but Manleder does return to the crooks' secret underground workshop, where they copy artworks. In the ensuing gunfight, Buchanan is killed, but the shots destroy the electrical circuits controlling the only way in, trapping them all in the soundproof chamber. Blackie comes up with the idea to start a fire in the ventilation shaft, and firemen arrive to let them out.

== Cast ==
- Chester Morris as Boston Blackie
- Harriet Hilliard as Diane Parrish
- Martin Spellman as Jimmy Parrish
- Richard Lane as Inspector Farraday
- George E. Stone as The Runt
- Lloyd Corrigan as Arthur Manleder
- Joan Woodbury as Mona
- Walter Sande as Detective Mathews
- Ralph Theodore as Joe Buchanan
- Kenneth MacDonald as Caulder
- Walter Soderling as Eric Allison
- William Benedict as Ice Cream Man (as Billy Benedict)
