= Boston Blackie and the Law =

1946 film by D. Ross Lederman

- Film poster
- Directed by: D. Ross Lederman
- Written by: Jack Boyle (character); Harry Essex; Malcolm Stuart Boylan (add. dialogue)
- Produced by: Ted Richmond
- Starring: Chester Morris; Trudy Marshall; Constance Dowling
- Cinematography: George Meehan
- Edited by: James Sweeney
- Music by: Hans Sommer
- Production company: Columbia Pictures
- Distributed by: Columbia Pictures
- Release date: December 12, 1946
- Running time: 70 minutes
- Country: United States
- Language: English

Boston Blackie and the Law is the twelfth of fourteen Columbia Pictures films starring Chester Morris as reformed crook Boston Blackie.

== Plot ==
When Boston Blackie performs magic tricks at a Thanksgiving Day party for the inmates of a women's prison, Dinah Moran (Constance Dowling) volunteers to enter a booth. She disappears after he draws the curtain, but as a former magician's assistant, uses the opportunity to escape. Police Inspector Farraday (Richard Lane) takes Blackie into custody as an accomplice, but Blackie easily gets away himself.

A trip to the library reveals that Dinah was sent to prison for three years for a robbery that netted $100,000 (which was never recovered) and a dead victim. Her magician former husband, John Lampau, was acquitted. Blackie tracks Lampau down, still performing magic, but now under the name of Jani, to warn him. Dinah shows up minutes later, having heard that Jani intends to marry his new assistant, Irene (Trudy Marshall). Dinah has come to make sure she gets her half of the loot. In a scuffle, she grazes Jani's right hand with a gunshot before fleeing. Blackie arranges to impersonate Jani, while the magician hides in Blackie's absent friend's apartment.

That night, Blackie is awoken by sounds in Jani's apartment. When he investigates, a woman runs out of the unlit room.

Blackie eventually locates the money in Jani's safety deposit box and takes it, still disguised as Jani. Outside, Dinah forces him at gunpoint to give her the envelope containing the loot, but when she opens it, it is empty. Blackie had taken the precaution of pocketing the money. In the meantime, Blackie's friend returns home from a trip early and finds Jani's body in the closet. Farraday corners and arrests Blackie and his sidekick, "the Runt" (George E. Stone), for murder. Blackie easily escapes from his cell.

Returning to the theatre where Jani performed, he finds an armed Irene over Dinah's lifeless body. She admits she herself was after the money all along. She makes Blackie hand it over, before calling the police. When Farraday and his dimwitted assistant, Sergeant Matthews (Frank Sully), arrive, Blackie tells them he recorded Irene's confession when he turned on the radio for some music. When he plays it for them, Irene tries to run, but is caught and taken away. Blackie then informs Farraday that there was no recording; he merely used ventriloquism to reenact his part of the prior conversation to fool Irene.

== Cast ==
- Chester Morris as Boston Blackie
- Trudy Marshall as Irene
- Constance Dowling as Dinah Moran
- Richard Lane as Inspector Farraday
- George E. Stone as "The Runt"
- Frank Sully as Sergeant Matthews
- Warren Ashe as John Lampau / John Jani
