= Jay Dratler =

American screenwriter

Jay Dratler (September 14, 1910 – September 25, 1968) was an American screenwriter and novelist.

== Biography ==
Born in New York City to a mother originally from Austria, he attended the University of North Carolina at Chapel Hill in the late 1920s, then studied at the Sorbonne in France and the University of Vienna, achieving fluency in French and German.

After his return to the United States in 1932, he worked as an editor for a New York publisher and translated the books Goya and Zeppelin from German to English. He then moved to Hollywood, becoming a successful novelist and rising to prominence as a screenwriter during the classic era of film noir in the 1940s. He wrote six novels, many screenplays and more than twenty television scripts. He won an Edgar Allan Poe Award for Call Northside 777, and was an Oscar nominee for the 1944 film noir, Laura. The 1948 film noir, Pitfall, was based on Dratler's novel of the same title.

Later in life, Dratler became conversant in Spanish, moving to Mexico in the 1960s. Dratler died of a heart attack in 1968 at the British-American Hospital in Mexico City. His body was returned to New York. He was survived by his widow, Berenice, and their two children, a daughter and son. The latter, Jay Dratler Jr., became a professor at the University of Akron School of Law, specializing in intellectual property law.

== Works ==
=== Novels ===
- Manhattan Side Street (1936) Longmans, Green and Co., New York
- Ducks in Thunder (1940) Reynal & Hitchcock, New York (later re-titled All for a Woman)
- The Pitfall (1947) Thomas Y. Crowell Co., New York
- The Judas Kiss (1955) Henry Holt and Co., New York
- Doctor Paradise (1957) Popular Library, New York
- Without Mercy (1957) Robert Hale, London
- Dream of a Woman (1958) Popular Library, New York

==== Translations ====
- Goya. A portrait of the artist as a man (1936) Knight Publications, New York
  Translated by Clement Greenberg, Emma Ashton and Jay Dratler,
  from the German by Manfred Schneider (1935) Don Francisco de Goya
- Zeppelin, the story of lighter-than-air craft (1937) Longmans & Co., London
  Translated by Jay Dratler from the German by Ernst A Lehmann and Leonhard Adelt (1936)
  Auf Luftpatrouille und Weltfahrt - Erlebnisse eines Zeppelinführers in Krieg und Frieden - Zeppelin,
  Schmidt & Günther, Kelkheim, Germany ISBN 978-0025828308

=== Screenplays ===
Dratler's films as screenwriter, often with collaborators, include:

- La Conga Nights (1940) Universal
- Girls Under 21 (1940) Columbia
- Confessions of Boston Blackie (1941)
- Meet Boston Blackie (1941) Columbia
- The Wife Takes a Flyer (1942)
- Fly-by-Night (1942)
- Get Hep to Love (1942)
- Laura (1944)
- Higher and Higher (1944)
- It's in the Bag! (1945)
- The Dark Corner (1946)
- Call Northside 777 (1948)
- That Wonderful Urge (1948)
- Dancing in the Dark (1949)
- Impact (1949)
- The Las Vegas Story (1952)
- We're Not Married! (1952)
- I Aim at the Stars (1960)

=== Plays ===
- A Grape for Seeing (1965)
- The Women of Troy (1966)
