= Richard Lane (announcer) =

American actor and television announcer (1899–1982)

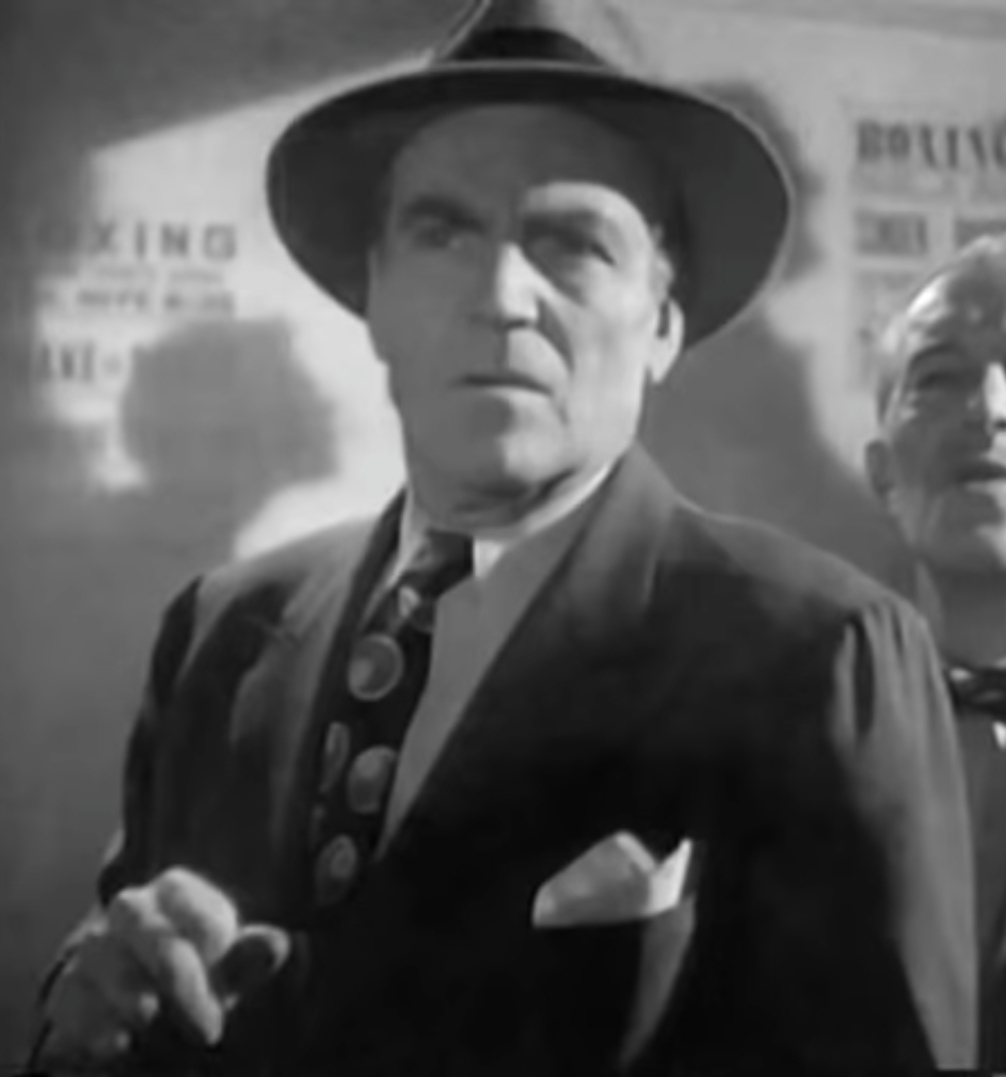
- Lane in The Admiral Was a Lady (1950)
- Born: Richard Lane; May 28, 1899; Rice Lake, Wisconsin, U.S.
- Died: September 5, 1982 (aged 83); Newport Beach, California, U.S.
- Resting place: Pacific View Memorial Park, Orange County California
- Occupations: Actor; television announcer
- Years active: 1936–1978

Richard Lane (May 28, 1899 – September 5, 1982), sometimes known as Dick Lane, was an American actor and television announcer/presenter. In movies, he played assured, fast-talking slickers: usually press agents, policemen and detectives, sometimes swindlers and frauds. He is perhaps best known to movie fans as "Inspector Farraday" in the Boston Blackie mystery-comedies. Lane also played Faraday in the first radio version of Boston Blackie, which ran on NBC from June 23, 1944 to September 15, 1944. Lane was an early arrival on television, first as a news reporter and then as a sports announcer, broadcasting wrestling and roller derby shows on KTLA-TV, mainly from the Olympic Auditorium in Los Angeles.

== Biography ==
=== Early years ===
Lane was born in 1899 in Rice Lake, Wisconsin to a farm family. Early in life he developed talents for reciting poetry and doing various song-and-dance acts.

By his teenage years, Lane was doing an "iron jaw" routine in circuses around Europe and worked as a drummer touring with a band in Australia. After the decline of vaudeville, Lane found work in motion pictures. He started in small roles but producers and directors saw how well he handled dialogue, and he soon became one of Hollywood's busiest actors, equally skilled at drama and comedy. A shrewd businessman, Lane insisted on a two-week guarantee for every assignment. He might work for only a few days on a picture, but still be paid for the two weeks. This allowed him to accept multiple jobs weekly, and with the extra pay he soon became a seasoned investor. During one six-month period Richard Lane appeared in 29 feature films.

During World War II, he appeared as emcee with USO troops entertaining G.I.s. His unit appeared at Fort MacArthur in September 1944. Lane also announced for the Jalopy Derby and Destruction Derby at Ascot Park, Gardena, California.

Lane appeared in character roles in more than 150 films between 1937 and 1951. He was so firmly established as a rapid-fire sharpie that Columbia Pictures producer Jules White co-starred him with "nervous" comedian Gus Schilling for a series of two-reel slapstick comedies. Schilling and Lane were a popular team at Columbia, second only to The Three Stooges. The series ran from 1945 to 1950.

Lane's only starring roles were in the Schilling and Lane shorts and a single feature film, Devil Ship (1948), in which he played tough ship's captain "Biff Brown."

=== Work with KTLA ===
Because he had been working for Paramount Pictures, Lane was able to obtain work at experimental TV station KTLA, which was owned by the studio at the time. When the station went commercial in 1947, Lane appeared before the camera as a news presenter. One of the early highlights of his career was reporting on the first atomic explosion covered by a television newscast.

When KTLA agreed to broadcast wrestling matches from the Olympic Auditorium in 1946, Lane was assigned to comment on the action. He started announcing (as Dick Lane) for Roller Derby in 1951, and for Roller Games for 15 years starting in 1961. Because Lane was part of the Hollywood establishment, he gave Roller Games a measure of respectability. Announcing games for the L.A. Thunderbirds at trackside, with cigarette dangling, Lane's oversized personality became closely associated with the sport. For pro wrestling, his broadcasts featured such personalities as Gorgeous George, Mr. Moto, and Dr. Lee Grable. Contrary to popular opinion it was Lane, not former ABC sports announcer Keith Jackson, who first coined the exclamatory expression "Whoa, Nellie!" when something exciting happened in the ring or on the track.

In the late 1940s, Lane became a character actor in westerns and outdoor adventures; his role as a tale-spinning windbag alongside bandleader Spade Cooley in the feature film Everybody's Dancin' won him the role of "Leather Britches" on Cooley's TV series for KTLA.

As movie production wound down after World War II, Lane devoted more of his time to television, particularly his wrestling shows. He spoke with great enthusiasm, improvising exotic names for the various wrestling holds, like "the Boston land-crab." When one wrestler pretended to bite the ear of his opponent, Lane would cry, "Meat on the table!" Another call familiar to viewers was "Wow, what action!" which invariably preceded a commercial break.

=== Radio ===
Beginning in 1950, on The Phil Harris-Alice Faye Show, Lane portrayed 'Milligan,' the fast-talking producer of a burlesque show. Was also the first actor to play 'Grogan,' a criminal thug, who sometimes takes it upon himself to "help" Phil Harris.

=== Later years ===
After Lane retired from television full-time in 1972, he accepted few offers for screen work; in later years he was typecast as a sports announcer. He did make a notable cameo appearance (as a roller-derby commentator) in Raquel Welch's film Kansas City Bomber. In 1974 he moved to a home in the Deep Well neighborhood of Palm Springs, California.

Lane was among the initial honorees on the Walk of Fame with his official ceremony date being listed as taking place on February 8, 1960. Lanes's Hollywood Walk of Fame star in on the north side of the 6300 block of Hollywood Boulevard.

Lane died in Newport Beach, California on September 5, 1982. He was buried in Pacific View Memorial Park, Orange County California. In 1996, Lane was posthumously inducted into the Wrestling Observer Newsletter Hall of Fame. In 2008, Lane was inducted into the 'Announcers Wing' of the Roller Derby Hall of Fame.

== Selected filmography ==
- The Woman I Love (1937) as Florence's Boyfriend (uncredited)
- The Outcasts of Poker Flat (1937) as 'High-Grade'
- You Can't Buy Luck (1937) as Detective Mac McGrath
- There Goes My Girl (1937) as Editor Tim J. Whelan
- You Can't Beat Love (1937) as Iceman (uncredited)
- New Faces of 1937 (1937) as Broker Harry Barnes
- Super-Sleuth (1937) as Tourist Bus Driver
- Flight from Glory (1937) as Mr. Hanson
- The Life of the Party (1937) as Hotel Manager
- Should Wives Work? (1937, Short)
- Saturday's Heroes (1937) as Red Watson
- Danger Patrol (1937) as Bill
- Hitting a New High (1937) as Owner of the Chez Suzette Nightclub (uncredited)
- Wise Girl (1937) as Detective
- Crashing Hollywood (1938) as Hugo Wells
- Everybody's Doing It (1938) as Steve Devers
- Radio City Revels (1938) as Crane
- Bringing Up Baby (1938) as Circus Manager (uncredited)
- Maid's Night Out (1938) as Barker for Octopus Concession (uncredited)
- This Marriage Business (1938) as Joe Selby
- Go Chase Yourself (1938) as Nails
- Joy of Living (1938) as Harvey (uncredited)
- Blind Alibi (1938) as Bowers
- I'm from the City (1938) as Captain Oliver 'Ollie' Fitch
- Carefree (1938) as Henry - Country Club Headwaiter (uncredited)
- Mr. Doodle Kicks Off (1938) as Assistant Coach 'Offsides' Jones
- Exposed (1938) as Tony Mitchell
- His Exciting Night (1938) as Homer Carslake
- The Last Warning (1938) as Steve Felson
- Charlie Chan in Honolulu (1938) as Joe Arnold
- Mr. Moto in Danger Island (1939) as Commissioner Gordon
- Union Pacific (1939) as Sam Reed
- For Love or Money (1939) as Foster
- It Could Happen to You (1939) as District Attorney Gibson
- Unexpected Father (1939) as Leo Murphy - Booking Agent
- Stronger Than Desire (1939) as Jerry Brody
- News Is Made at Night (1939) as Barney Basely
- Mutiny on the Blackhawk (1939) as Kit Carson
- The Day the Bookies Wept (1939) as Ramsey Firpo
- Hero for a Day (1939) as Abbott
- The Escape (1939) as David Clifford
- Sued for Libel (1939) as Smiley Dugan
- Drunk Driving (1939, Short) as Rick
- Main Street Lawyer (1939) as Ballou, Marco's Lawyer
- The Amazing Mr. Williams (1939) as Reagan (uncredited)
- Nick Carter, Master Detective (1939) as Sam Vaughn (uncredited)
- City of Chance (1940) as Marty Connors
- Free, Blonde and 21 (1940) as Lt. Lake
- Two Girls on Broadway (1940) as Buddy Bartell
- Sandy Is a Lady (1940) as Philip Jarvis
- The Biscuit Eater (1940) as Harvey McNeil
- Brother Orchid (1940) as Mugsy O'Day
- Boom Town (1940) as Assistant District Attorney
- Hired Wife (1940) as McNab
- The Bride Wore Crutches (1940) as Bill Daly
- Yesterday's Heroes (1940) as Cleats Slater
- Margie (1940) as Mr. Dixon
- Youth Will Be Served (1940) as Mr. Hewitt
- Ride, Kelly, Ride (1941) as Dan Thomas
- Meet the Chump (1941) as Slugs Bennett
- Meet Boston Blackie (1941) as Inspector John Farraday
- A Girl, a Guy, and a Gob (1941) as Recruiting Officer
- The Penalty (1941) as Craig
- I Wanted Wings (1941) as Flight Commander
- The Cowboy and the Blonde (1941) as Gilbert
- Sunny (1941) as Reporter
- Time Out for Rhythm (1941) as Mike Armstrong
- For Beauty's Sake (1941) as Mr. Jackman
- Tight Shoes (1941) as Allan McGrath
- San Antonio Rose (1941) as Charles J. Willoughby
- Navy Blues (1941) as 'Rocky' Anderson
- Man at Large (1941) as Editor Grundy
- Riders of the Purple Sage (1941) as Steve Oldring
- Confessions of Boston Blackie (1941) as Inspector John Farraday
- Hellzapoppin' (1941) as Director
- Ride 'Em Cowboy (1942) as Pete Conway (uncredited)
- Butch Minds the Baby (1942) as Harry the Horse
- To the Shores of Tripoli (1942) as Lieutenant
- Junior G-Men of the Air (1942, Serial) as Agent Don Ames
- Alias Boston Blackie (1942) as Inspector John Farraday
- Drums of the Congo (1942) as Coutlass
- Dr. Broadway (1942) as Police Sgt. Patrick Doyle
- A-Haunting We Will Go (1942) as Phillips
- Boston Blackie Goes Hollywood (1942) as Inspector John Farraday
- Time to Kill (1942) as Lt. Breeze
- Arabian Nights (1942) as Corporal
- Air Force (1943) as Maj. W.G. Roberts
- It Ain't Hay (1943) as Slicker
- After Midnight with Boston Blackie (1943) as Inspector John Farraday
- Swing Your Partner (1943) as Mr. Lane
- Fired Wife (1943) as Orin Tracy
- Thank Your Lucky Stars (1943) as Barney Johnson (uncredited)
- Corvette K-225 (1943) as Vice Admiral
- Crazy House (1943) as S. E. Hanley
- The Chance of a Lifetime (1943) as Inspector John Farraday
- Gung Ho! (1943) as Captain Dunphy
- Slightly Terrific (1944) as Mike Hamilton
- Bermuda Mystery (1944) as Detective Sergeant Donovan
- Take It Big (1944) as Eddie Hampton
- Louisiana Hayride (1944) as J. Huntington McMasters
- Mr. Winkle Goes to War (1944) as Sgt. 'Alphabet' Czeidrowski
- A Wave, a WAC and a Marine (1944) as Marty Allen
- One Mysterious Night (1944) as Inspector John Farraday
- Bowery to Broadway (1944) as Walter Rogers
- Brazil (1944) as Edward Graham
- What a Blonde (1945) as Pomeroy
- Here Come the Co-Eds (1945) as Near-sighted Man at Ballroom
- Two O'Clock Courage (1945) as Al Haley
- The Horn Blows at Midnight (1945) as Furness - Radio Announcer (uncredited)
- Boston Blackie Booked on Suspicion (1945) as Inspector John Farraday
- The Bullfighters (1945) as 'Hot Shot' Coleman
- Wonder Man (1945) as Assistant District Attorney
- Boston Blackie's Rendezvous (1945) as Inspector John Farraday
- Girl on the Spot (1946) as 'Weepy' McGurk
- A Close Call for Boston Blackie (1946) as Inspector John Farraday
- Talk About a Lady (1946) as Duke Randall
- The Phantom Thief (1946) as Inspector John Farraday
- Pardon My Terror (1946, Short) as Dick
- Gentleman Joe Palooka (1946) as Phillips
- Sioux City Sue (1946) as Jefferson Lang
- Boston Blackie and the Law (1946) as Inspector John Farraday
- Song of Scheherazade (1947) as Lieutenant
- Hit Parade of 1947 (1947) as Serial Director
- Out of the Blue (1947) as Detective Noonan
- Devil Ship (1947) as Capt. 'Biff' Brown
- Tenth Avenue Angel (1948) as Street Vendor
- The Return of the Whistler (1948) as Gaylord Traynor
- Trapped by Boston Blackie (1948) as Inspector John Farraday
- The Babe Ruth Story (1948) as Boston Braves' coach
- The Creeper (1948) as Insp. Fenwick
- He's in Again (1949, Short) as Dick
- Miss Mink of 1949 (1949) as Herbert Pendelton
- Boston Blackie's Chinese Venture (1949) as Inspector John Farraday
- Take Me Out to the Ball Game (1949) as Michael Gilhuly
- Mighty Joe Young (1949) as City Attorney (uncredited)
- That Midnight Kiss (1949) as Radio D.J. (uncredited)
- The Big Wheel (1949) as Reno Riley
- There's a Girl in My Heart (1949) as Sergeant Mullin
- Quicksand (1950) as Lt. Nelson
- Everybody's Dancin' (1950) as Colonel Ed Harrison
- The Jackie Robinson Story (1950) as Clay Hopper, Montreal Manager
- The Admiral Was a Lady (1950) as Marty Gruber
- I Can Get It for You Wholesale (1951) as Kelley
- Leave It to Beaver (1/22/1959) as Marshal Moran
- Visit to a Small Planet (1960) as Superbo Television Spokesman (uncredited)
- The Killers (1964) as Demolition Derby Announcer (uncredited)
- Dear Brigitte (1965) as Racetrack Announcer (uncredited)
- The Munsters (9/30/1965) as The Announcer
- Kansas City Bomber (1972) as Len
- The Shaggy D.A. (1976) as Roller Rink Announcer
- The One and Only (1978) (uncredited) (final film role)

== See also ==
- O'Connor Plating Works disaster – 1947 news event which Lane covered
