= The Big Brain =

1933 film

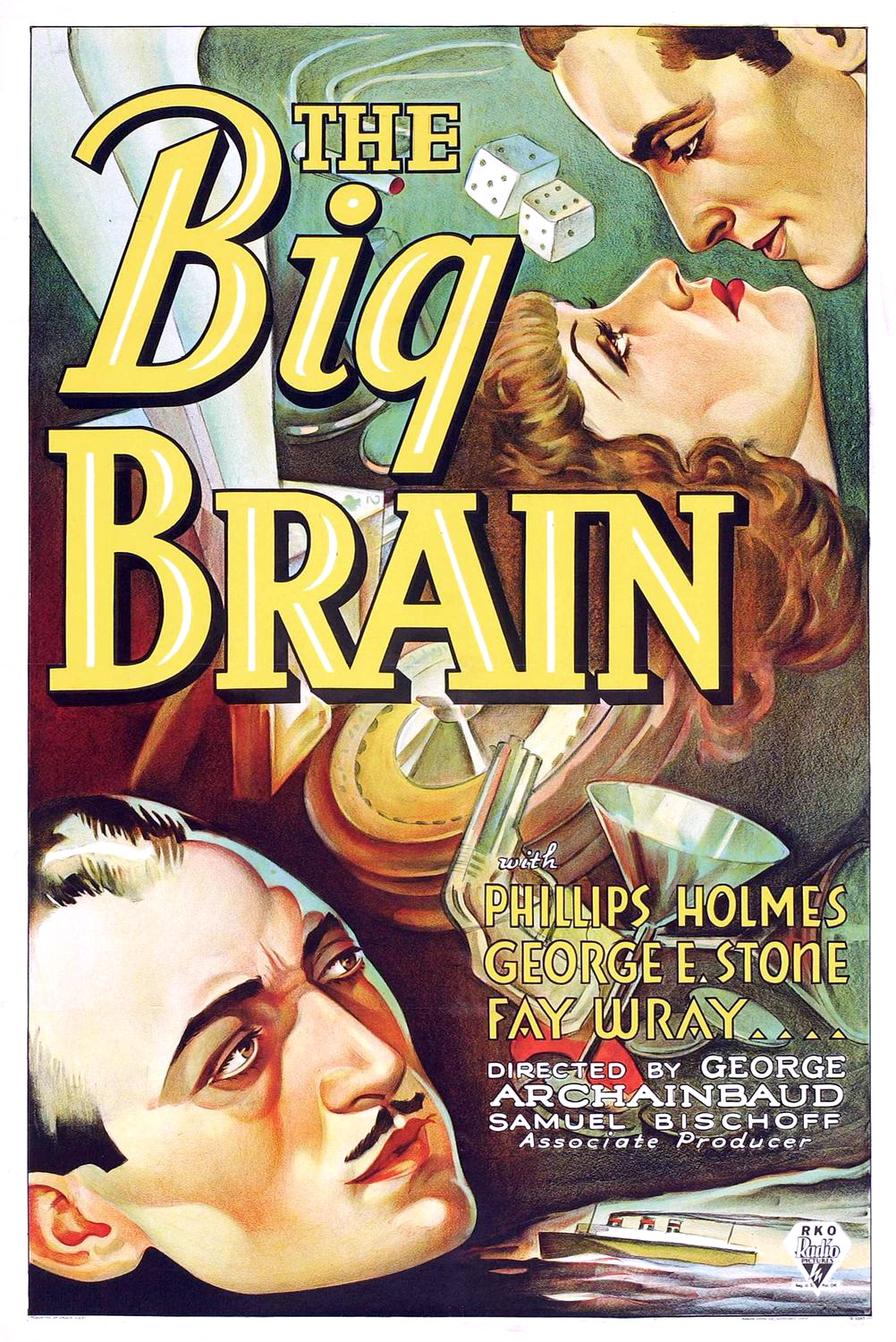
- Theatrical release poster
- Directed by: George Archainbaud
- Screenplay by: Sy Bartlett; Warren Duff
- Story by: Sy Bartlett
- Produced by: Samuel Bischoff
- Starring: George E. Stone; Phillips Holmes; Fay Wray; Minna Gombell; Lilian Bond
- Cinematography: Arthur Edeson
- Edited by: Rose Loewinger
- Production company: K.B.S. Productions Inc.
- Distributed by: RKO Radio Pictures
- Release date: August 5, 1933
- Running time: 72 minutes
- Country: United States
- Language: English

The Big Brain is a 1933 American pre-Code drama film directed by George Archainbaud and written by Sy Bartlett and Warren Duff. The film stars George E. Stone, Phillips Holmes, Fay Wray, Minna Gombell and Lilian Bond. The film was released on August 5, 1933, by RKO Pictures.

== Plot ==
A ruthless small time crook's rise from backroom bookie in a barber shop to that of high stakes international con artist. Max Werner gets rich as he moves from gambling to crooked stocks and bond dealing. Fleeing the authorities, he absconds to England where he continues his deceptions and setting up fake companies. Following a newspaper exposé of an accomplice, he double-crosses another and returns to America with his girlfriend, where a trap awaits him.

== Cast ==
- Phillips Holmes as Terry Van Sloan
- George E. Stone as Max Werner
- Fay Wray as Cynthia Glennon
- Minna Gombell as Margy
- Lilian Bond as Dorothy Norton
- Reginald Owen as Lord Darlington
- Berton Churchill as Colonel Higginbotham
- Reginald Mason as Lord Latham
- Sam Hardy as "Slick" Ryan
- Charles McNaughton as Wallack
- Lucien Littlefield as Justice of the Peace
