= Miss Mink of 1949 =

1949 film by Glenn Tryon

- Directed by: Glenn Tryon
- Screenplay by: Arnold Belgard
- Produced by: Sol M. Wurtzel
- Starring: Jimmy Lydon; Lois Collier; Richard Lane; Barbara Brown; Paul Guilfoyle; June Storey
- Cinematography: Benjamin H. Kline
- Edited by: William F. Claxton
- Music by: Mahlon Merrick
- Distributed by: 20th Century Fox
- Release date: February 11, 1949
- Running time: 69 minutes
- Country: United States
- Language: English

Miss Mink of 1949 is a 1949 American comedy film directed by Glenn Tryon (his last film as a director) and written by Arnold Belgard. It stars Jimmy Lydon, Lois Collier (in her final film role), Richard Lane, Barbara Brown, Paul Guilfoyle and June Storey. The film was released on February 11, 1949, by 20th Century Fox.

== Plot ==
Alice Forrester wins a $10,000 mink in a radio contest. Alice's husband Joe is a clerk who works for Herb Pendleton, whose wife Rose desperately wants that coat. Herb offers Joe a promotion and $5,000, telling him it'll save Joe the cost of paying a tax and insurance on the coat as well as taking Alice to expensive places to wear it.

Alice's mother and Uncle Newton live with them. Her mom, Mrs. Marshall, is eager to see Alice socialize in the coat. Newton, an insurance salesman, is given money by Joe to insure it, but Newton's bookie demands the cash. At a party, Rose shocks Alice by saying the coat now belongs to her. A fight breaks out, the coat is damaged and both Joe and Herb are kicked out of their houses by their wives.

The men scheme to fake a robbery to collect the insurance. Real thieves turn up and flee with the coat, whereupon Joe learns that Newton didn't insure it. The crooks are chased by the cops and hastily discard the mink. O'Mulvaney, a chef, finds it and takes it to wife Maureen, who is thrilled. Everybody ends up rounded up by the police and taken before a judge, who tries to sort out who owns what. Alice ultimately gets to keep the coat and Joe gets a promotion at work with a raise.

== Cast ==
- Jimmy Lydon as Joe Forrester
- Lois Collier as Alice Forrester
- Richard Lane as Herbert Pendleton
- Barbara Brown as Mrs. Marshall
- Paul Guilfoyle as Uncle Newton
- June Storey as Rose Pendleton
- Grandon Rhodes as Nietsche aka Imhoff Schultz
- Walter Sande as Sean O'Mulvaney
- Don Kohler as Skeet Price
- Vera Marshe as Hortense
- Dorothy Granger as Mrs. Maureen O'Mulvaney
- Iris Adrian as Mrs. McKelvey
