= Trapped by Boston Blackie =

1948 film directed by Seymour Friedman

- Directed by: Seymour Friedman
- Screenplay by: Maurice Tombragel
- Story by: Charles Marion; Edward Bock
- Based on: Based upon the character created by Jack Boyle
- Produced by: Rudolph C. Flothow
- Starring: Chester Morris
- Cinematography: Philip Tannura, A.S.C.
- Edited by: Dwight Caldwell
- Music by: Mischa Bakaleinikoff (musical director)
- Production company: Columbia Pictures
- Distributed by: Columbia Pictures Corporation
- Release date: May 13, 1948
- Running time: 67 minutes
- Country: United States
- Language: English

Trapped by Boston Blackie is a 1948 American crime drama directed by Seymour Friedman. It is the thirteenth of fourteen Columbia Pictures films starring Chester Morris as reformed crook Boston Blackie, and the final film with George E. Stone as his sidekick, "The Runt".

== Plot ==
Blackie's detective friend Joe Kenyon has died in a suspicious automobile accident, leaving his widow to operate his detective agency. Blackie and The Runt volunteer their services for a security job. They must protect an extremely expensive pearl necklace for a wealthy client, Claire Carter. When the pearls turn up missing, Blackie and The Runt become the prime suspects. They must clear their names and find the real culprit, along with any connection to Joe Kenyon's suspicious death.

== Production and reception ==
Columbia Pictures had been gradually curtailing its "B" film series; most of them ended in 1948 and 1949. Trade publisher Pete Harrison had already written off the Boston Blackie series, noting that "almost one and one-half years have gone by since the last Boston Blackie picture was made." Columbia often assigned first-time directors to one of its low-budget features, to monitor the new director's aptitude for staying on time and on budget. Seymour Friedman had been an assistant director who had filmed several scenes for Columbia's major musical Down to Earth. He was promoted to full-fledged director in late 1947 and given a Boston Blackie assignment; filming began on December 8. The finished film was released on May 13, 1948. Friedman had been given only 10 days to film the picture, and did it so efficiently that the series was extended for one more outing, Boston Blackie's Chinese Venture, filmed by Friedman in June 1948 but not released until March 1949.

Trapped by Boston Blackie, continuing in the same familiar pattern of the series, received encouraging notices. Showmen's Trade Review: "This is an entertaining entry in the Boston Blackie series, with Chester Morris and George E. Stone a good team. Chester Morris has become well known in the title role, and little Stone is strong as his comic sidekick. The rest of the cast in this picture is on the ball, including Richard Lane and Frank Sully." Motion Picture Herald: "[Morris and Stone] are the center of several exciting episodes which make this a diverting melodrama." The Exhibitor: "This has the usual series touches, involving mystery, action, disguises, an interest-holding story, adequate performances and direction, etc., and it will satisfy where others in the series have."

== Cast ==
- Chester Morris as Boston Blackie
- George E. Stone as "The Runt"
- Richard Lane as Inspector Farraday
- June Vincent as Doris Howell
- Patricia White as Joan Howell
- Edward Norris as Igor Borio
- Frank Sully as Sergeant Matthews
- Mary Currier as Helen Kenyon
- Fay Baker as Sandra Doray
- Sarah Selby as Claire Carter
- William Forrest as Mason Carter
