= Boston Blackie's Rendezvous =

1945 film directed by Arthur Dreifuss

- Film poster
- Directed by: Arthur Dreifuss
- Screenplay by: Edward Dein
- Story by: Taken from a story by Fred Schiller
- Based on: Based upon the character created by Jack Boyle
- Produced by: Alexis Thurn-Taxis
- Starring: Chester Morris
- Cinematography: George B. Meehan, Jr., A.S.C.
- Edited by: Aaron Stell
- Music by: M. R. Bakaleinikoff (musical director)
- Production company: Columbia Pictures
- Distributed by: Columbia Pictures Corporation
- Release date: July 5, 1945
- Running time: 64 minutes
- Country: United States
- Language: English

Boston Blackie's Rendezvous is a 1945 American crime film directed by Arthur Dreifuss. The working title of this film was Surprise in the Night.

== Plot ==
Boston Blackie's life gets complicated when maniac murderer James Cook goes on a killing spree, while pretending to be Boston Blackie. To further complicate matters, the murderer kidnaps Sally Brown to keep Boston Blackie at bay.

== Cast ==
- Chester Morris as Horatio 'Boston Blackie' Black
- Nina Foch as Sally Brown
- Steve Cochran as James Cook
- Richard Lane as Inspector John Farraday
- George E. Stone as The Runt
- Frank Sully as Detective Sergeant Matthews
- Iris Adrian as Martha
- Harry Hayden as Arthur Manleder (uncredited)
