= A Close Call for Boston Blackie =

1946 film by Lew Landers

- Film poster
- Directed by: Lew Landers
- Written by: Jack Boyle (character); Ben Markson; Paul Yawitz (story); Malcolm Stuart Boylan (add. dialogue)
- Produced by: John Stone
- Starring: Chester Morris; Lynn Merrick
- Cinematography: Burnett Guffey
- Edited by: Jerome Thoms
- Music by: Mischa Bakaleinikoff
- Distributed by: Columbia Pictures
- Release date: January 24, 1946
- Running time: 60 minutes
- Country: United States
- Language: English

A Close Call for Boston Blackie is a 1946 American crime film directed by Lew Landers. It is the 10th of 14 Columbia Pictures films starring Chester Morris as Boston Blackie.

== Plot ==
Ignoring Inspector Farraday's friendly advice to stop helping women, Boston Blackie goes to the rescue of a female being attacked by two men. She is Geraldine "Gerry" Peyton, an old flame of his. She begs him to help protect her baby from her husband John, who has just been paroled.

When John finds them together, he assumes that the child is Blackie's and draws a gun. A fight ensues during which an unseen third party shoots John. Acting on an anonymous tip, Farraday arrives soon after and assumes that Blackie is responsible for the dead body. Blackie has his sidekick, the "Runt", hide the baby at the apartment of the Runt's girlfriend, Mamie Carleton.

Blackie escapes from dimwitted Sergeant Matthews. An investigation soon arouses his suspicions. Gerry and Smiley Slade are trying to swindle her wealthy father-in-law Cyrus Peyton. The child is actually her brother Hack Hagen's. They framed Blackie in order to make John disappear. When Hagen tries to renege, worried that he will not be given his son, Smiley shoots him.

Disguised as Cyrus, Blackie goes to see the pair. He manages to overcome Smiley only to have Farraday break in, arrest him and let Gerry and Smiley go free. However, it is all a joke on Blackie. For once, Farraday has determined the identity of the real crooks. When Blackie goes downstairs, he sees the pair in handcuffs.

== Cast ==
- Chester Morris as Boston Blackie
- Lynn Merrick as Geraldine "Gerry" Peyton
- Richard Lane as Inspector Farraday
- Frank Sully as Sergeant Matthews
- George E. Stone as "The Runt"

== Reception ==
The Niagara Falls Review remarked that "the action comes with speed and suspense, not to mention plenty of laughter as relief."

Dorothy Masters of the New York Daily News wrote that the "new story isn't bad, but the comedy is."
