= Boston Blackie =

Fictional character created by author Jack Boyle

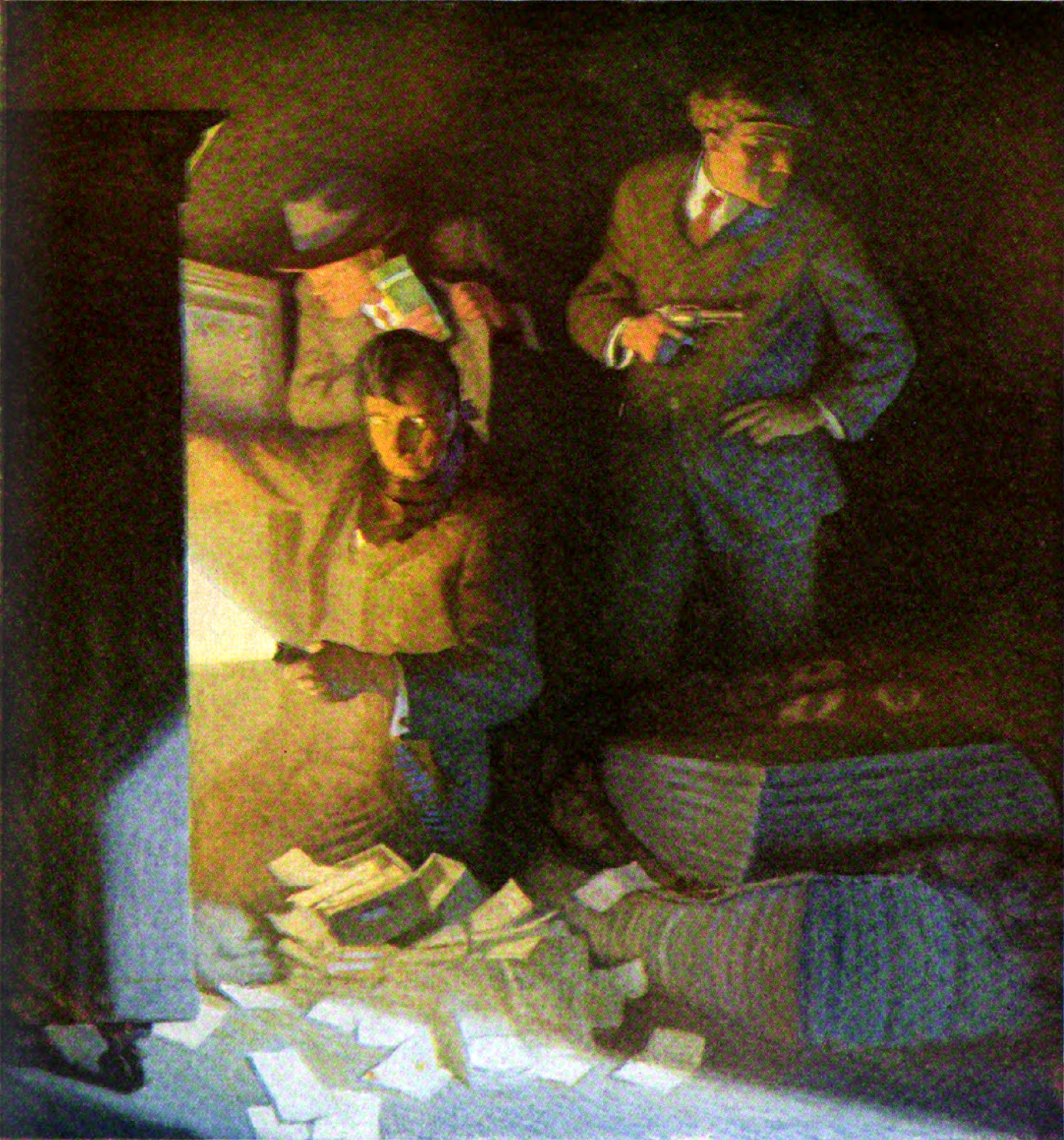
- "Unhurried and without excitement, but quickly, Boston Blackie forced drawer after drawer"— N. C. Wyeth illustrated "The Price of Principle" (1914) for The American Magazine
- First appearance: "The Price of Principle" (1914)
- Created by: Jack Boyle

In-universe information
- Gender: Male
- Occupation: Jewel thief, safecracker, detective

Boston Blackie is a fictional character created by author Jack Boyle (1881–1928). Blackie was originally depicted as a jewel thief and safecracker in Boyle's stories, an antihero who maintained his own code of honor and was fiercely loyal to friends. Blackie's image was softened for radio, film and television depictions, where he became a private detective and was described as an "enemy to those who make him an enemy, friend to those who have no friend."

Actor Chester Morris played the character in 14 Columbia Pictures films (1941–1949) and in a 1944 NBC radio series.

== Jack Boyle ==
Writer Jack Boyle was born in Oakland, California, and grew up in the San Francisco Bay Area. While working as a newspaper editor in San Francisco, he became an opium addict and was drawn into crime to support his habit. He was sent to San Quentin for writing bad checks. Later convicted of robbery in Denver, Colorado, Boyle was serving time at the Colorado State Penitentiary when he created the character of Boston Blackie.

== Books ==
The first four stories appeared in The American Magazine in 1914, with Boyle writing under the pen name "No. 6606". From 1917 to 1919, Boston Blackie stories appeared in The Red Book magazine, and from 1918 they were adapted for motion pictures.

When Boston Blackie began to find success on the screen, Boyle edited the Red Book magazine stories into a book, Boston Blackie (1919). He revised and rearranged the order of the stories to create a cohesive narrative—a common practice at the time known in publishing as a fixup. This was the only appearance of Boston Blackie in book form, but his adventures continued to appear in periodicals.

=== Short stories ===
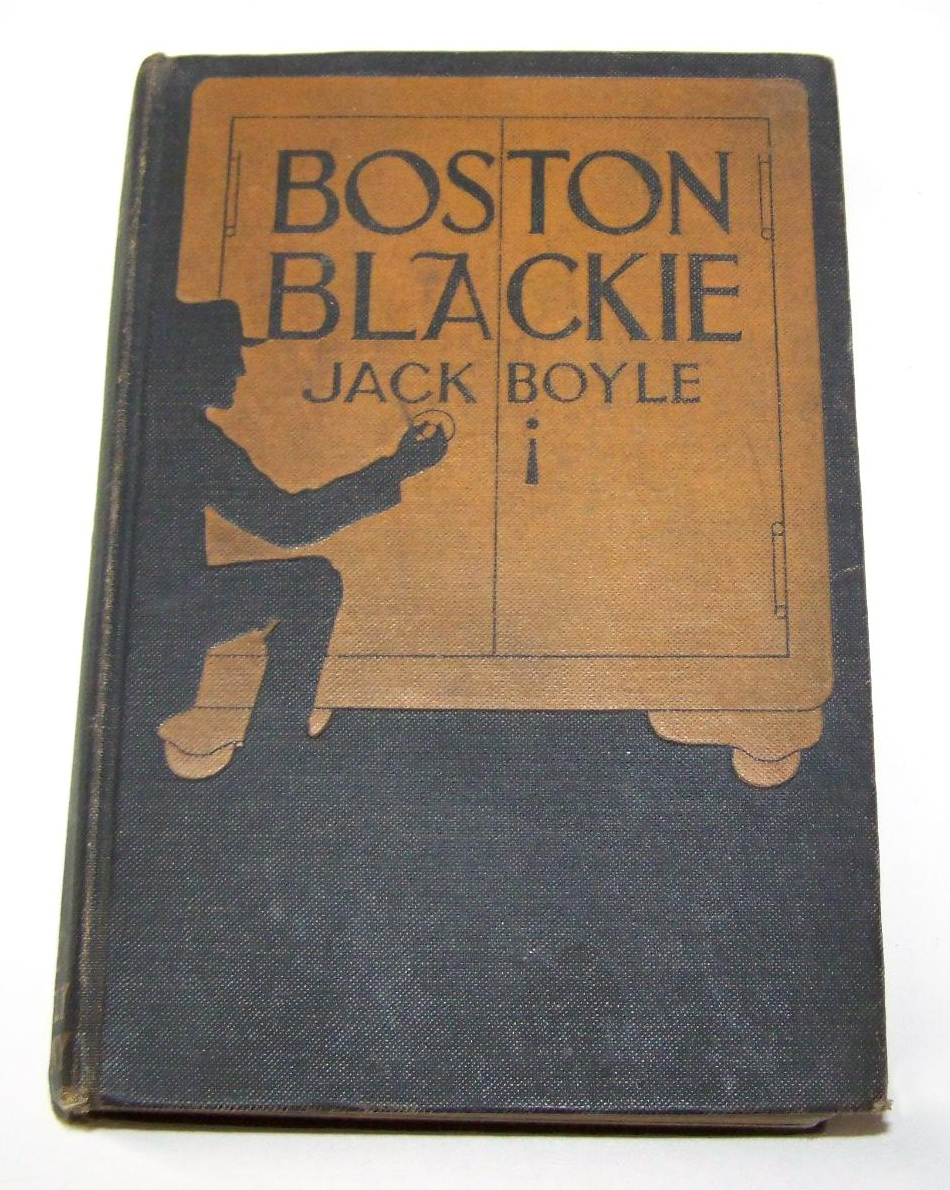
First edition of the short story collection Boston Blackie (1919)

Year	Title	Publisher	Publication date	Notes
1914	"The Price of Principle"	The American Magazine	July 1914	As No. 6606
1914	"The Story About Dad Morgan"	The American Magazine	August 1914	As No. 6606
1914	"Death Cell Visions"	The American Magazine	September 1914	As No. 6606
1914	"A Thief's Daughter"	The American Magazine	October 1914	As No. 6606
1917	"Boston Blackie's Mary"	The Red Book Magazine	November 1917	
1917	"The Woman Called Rita"	The Red Book Magazine	December 1917	
1918	"Fred the Count"	The Red Book Magazine	January 1918	
1918	"Miss Doris, Safe-Cracker"	The Red Book Magazine	May 1918	
1918	"Boston Blackie's Little Pal"	The Red Book Magazine	June 1918	
1918	"Alibi Ann"	The Red Book Magazine	July 1918	
1918	"Miss Doris's 'Raffles'"	The Strand Magazine	August 1918	
1918	"The Poppy Girl's Husband"	The Red Book Magazine	October 1918	
1918	"A Problem in Grand Larceny"	The Red Book Magazine	December 1918	
1919	"An Answer in Grand Larceny"	The Red Book Magazine	January 1919	
1919	"The Third Degree"	The Strand Magazine	April 1919	
1919	"The Daughter of Mother McGinn"	Cosmopolitan	June 1919	
1919	"Alias Prince Charming"	Cosmopolitan	July 1919	
1919	"Black Dan"	Cosmopolitan	October 1919	
1919	"The Water-Cross"	Cosmopolitan	November 1919	
1920	"Grandad's Girl"	Cosmopolitan	March 1920	
1920	"The Face in the Fog"	Cosmopolitan	May 1920	
1920	"The Painted Child"	Cosmopolitan	October 1920	
1920	"Boomerang Bill"	Cosmopolitan	December 1920	

== Films ==
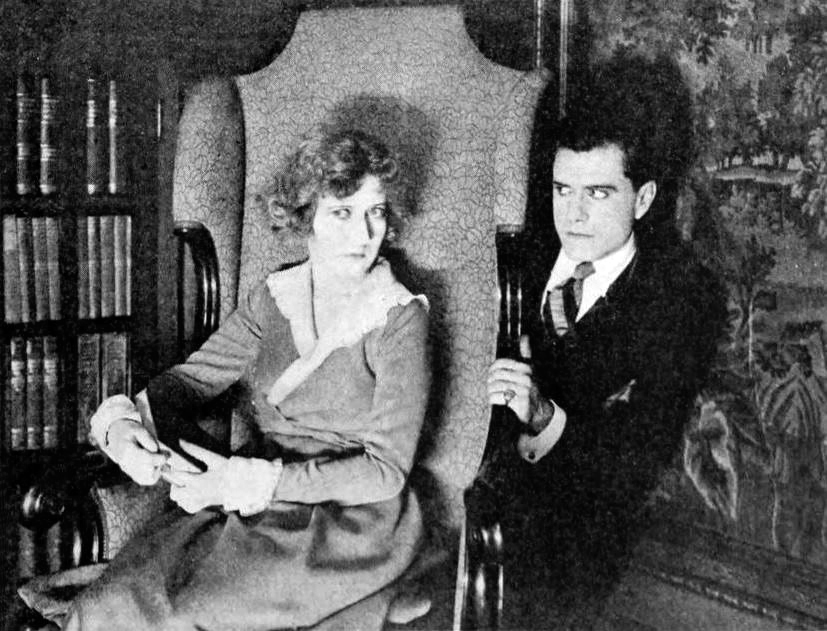
Rhea Mitchell (Mary) and Bert Lytell (Boston Blackie) in Boston Blackie's Little Pal (1918), a lost film

The earliest Boston Blackie film adaptations were silent, dating from 1918 to 1927. Columbia Pictures revived the property in 1941 with Meet Boston Blackie, a fast, 58-minute B movie starring Chester Morris. Although the running time was brief, Columbia gave the picture good production values and an imaginative director, Robert Florey. The film was successful, and a series followed.

In the Columbia features, Boston Blackie is a reformed jewel thief who is always suspected when a daring crime is committed. In order to clear himself, he investigates personally and brings the actual culprit to justice, sometimes using disguises. An undercurrent of comedy runs throughout the action/detective series.

In one of these films, After Midnight with Boston Blackie, the character's real name was revealed to be Horatio Black.

Morris gave the Blackie character his own personal charm: he could be light and flippant or stern and dangerous, as the situation demanded. His sidekick, the Runt, was always on hand to help his old friend. George E. Stone played Runt in all but the first and last films. Charles Wagenheim and Sid Tomack, respectively, substituted for Stone when he was not available.

Chester Morris as Blackie in the Columbia film series

Blackie's friendly adversaries were Inspector Farraday (Note: The surname of Boston Blackie's police adversary was spelled Faraday in only the first film, Meet Boston Blackie. In all subsequent films it was spelled Farraday.) of the police (played in all the films and the radio series by Richard Lane) and his assistant, Sergeant Matthews. Matthews was originally played as a hapless victim of circumstance by Walter Sande; he was replaced by Lyle Latell, who played it dumber, and then by comedian Frank Sully, who played it even dumber.

Blackie and Runt were often assisted in their endeavors by their friends: the cheerful but easily flustered millionaire Arthur Manleder (almost always played by Lloyd Corrigan; Harry Hayden and Harrison Greene each played the role once), and the streetwise pawnbroker Jumbo Madigan (played by Cy Kendall or Joseph Crehan). A variety of actresses including Rochelle Hudson, Harriet Hilliard, Adele Mara and Ann Savage took turns playing various gal Friday characters.

The films are highly typical of Columbia's B movies of the 1940s, with an assortment of veteran character actors (including Clarence Muse, Marvin Miller, George Lloyd, Byron Foulger), new faces on the way up (Larry Parks, Dorothy Malone, Nina Foch, Forrest Tucker, Lloyd Bridges) and stock-company players familiar from Columbia's features, serials, and short subjects (Kenneth MacDonald, George McKay, Eddie Laughton, John Tyrrell). The series was also a useful training ground for promising directors, including Edward Dmytryk, Oscar Boetticher, William Castle, and finally Seymour Friedman, who went on to work prolifically in Columbia's television department. The Boston Blackie series ran until 1949.

=== Filmography ===
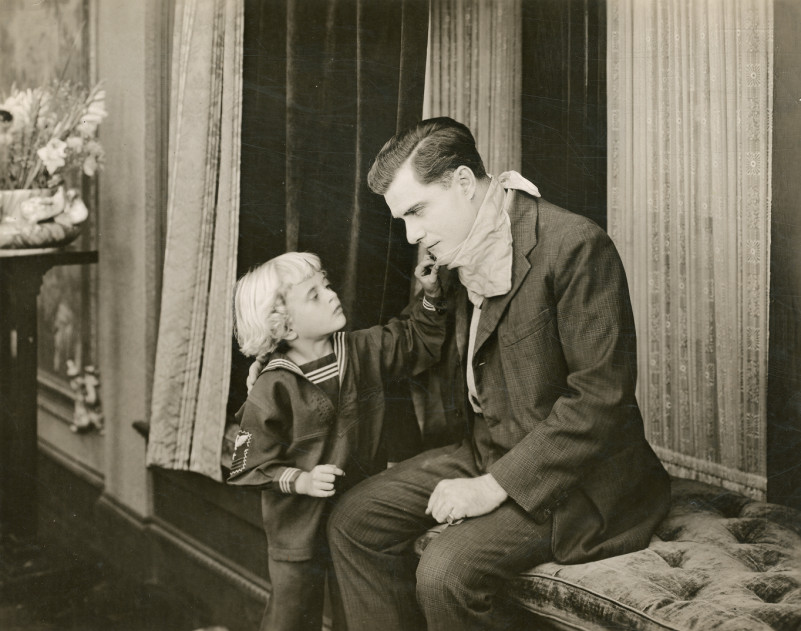
Joey Jacobs and Bert Lytell in Boston Blackie's Little Pal (1918)

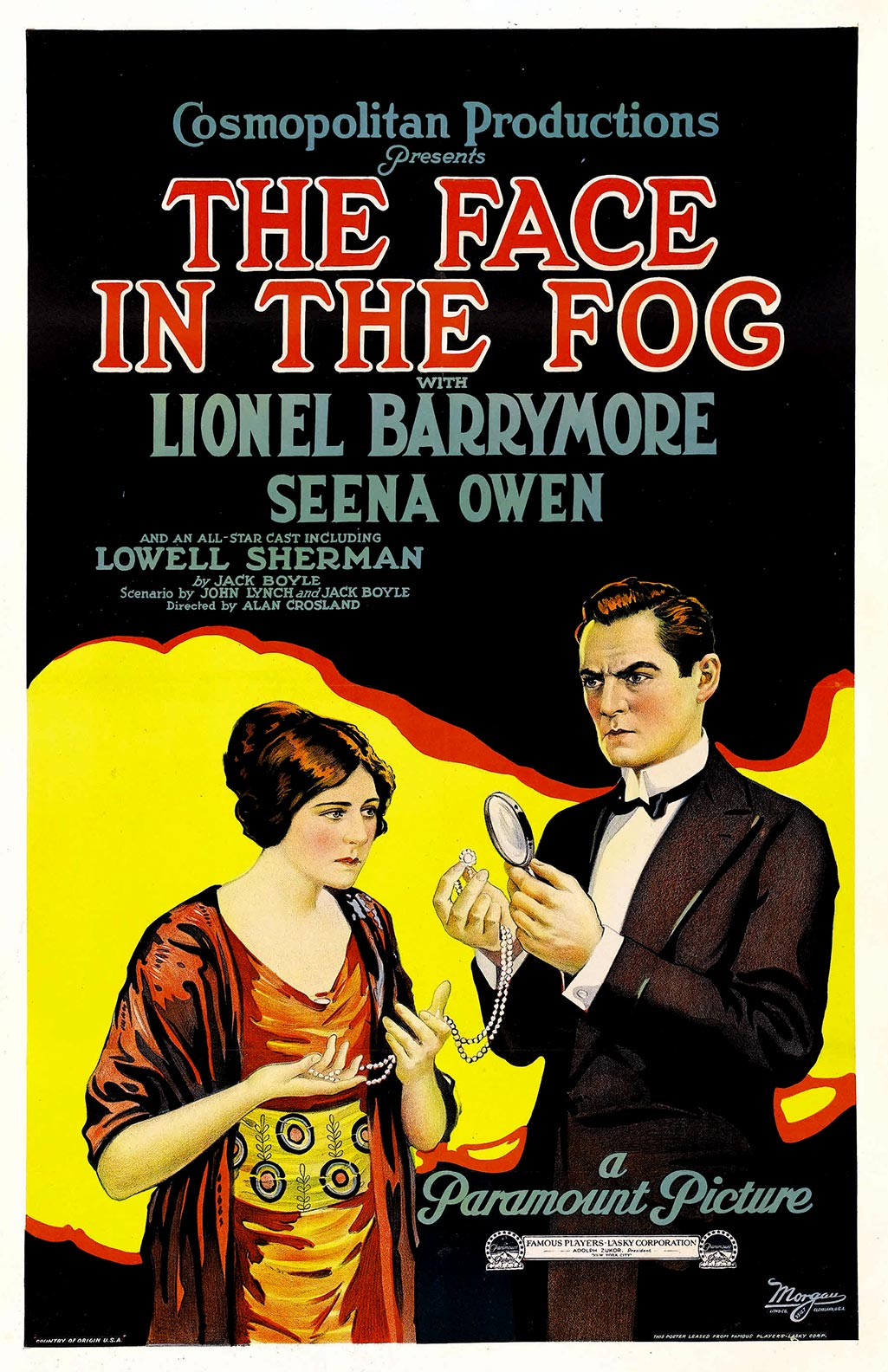
Poster for The Face in the Fog (1922), starring Lionel Barrymore

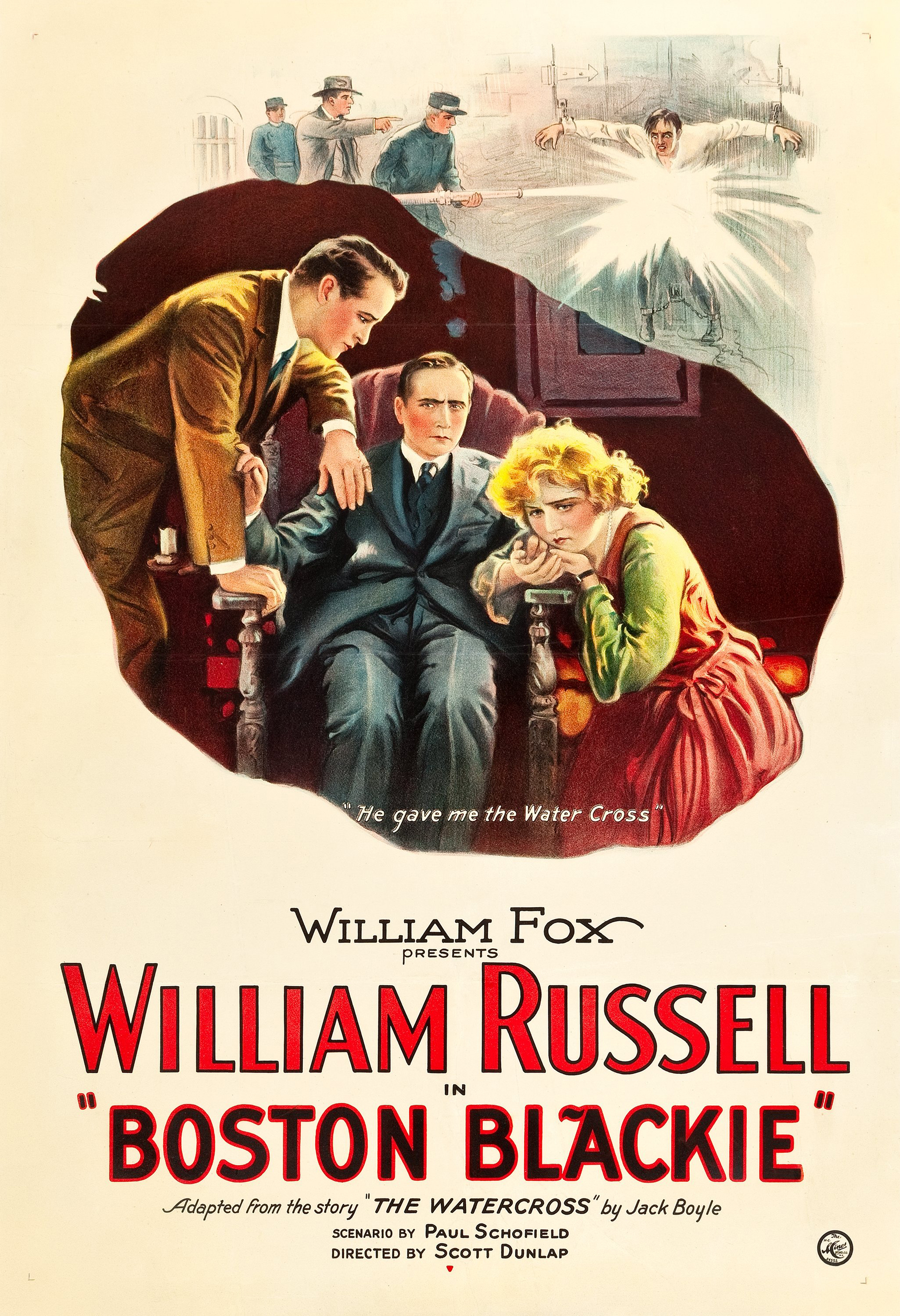
Poster for Boston Blackie (1923), starring William Russell

Year	Title	Actor	Notes
1918	Boston Blackie's Little Pal	Bert Lytell	Adapted from "Boston Blackie's Little Pal"
1919	The Poppy Girl's Husband	Walter Long	
1919	The Silk Lined Burglar	Sam De Grasse	Adapted from "Miss Doris, Safe-Cracker"
1919	Blackie's Redemption	Bert Lytell	Adapted from "Boston Blackie's Mary" and "Fred the Count"
1922	Boomerang Bill	Lionel Barrymore	Adapted from "Boomerang Bill"
1922	Missing Millions	David Powell	Adapted from "A Problem in Grand Larceny" and "An Answer in Grand Larceny"
1922	The Face in the Fog	Lionel Barrymore	
1923	Boston Blackie	William Russell	Adapted from "The Water-Cross"
1923	Crooked Alley	Thomas Carrigan	Adapted from Boyle's original story, "The Daughter of Crooked Alley"
1924	Through the Dark	Forrest Stanley	Adapted from "The Daughter of Mother McGinn"
1927	The Return of Boston Blackie	Raymond Glenn	
1941	Meet Boston Blackie	Chester Morris	
1941	Confessions of Boston Blackie	Chester Morris	
1942	Alias Boston Blackie	Chester Morris	
1942	Boston Blackie Goes Hollywood	Chester Morris	
1943	After Midnight with Boston Blackie	Chester Morris	
1943	The Chance of a Lifetime	Chester Morris	
1944	One Mysterious Night	Chester Morris	
1945	Boston Blackie Booked on Suspicion	Chester Morris	
1945	Boston Blackie's Rendezvous	Chester Morris	
1946	A Close Call for Boston Blackie	Chester Morris	
1946	The Phantom Thief	Chester Morris	
1946	Boston Blackie and the Law	Chester Morris	
1948	Trapped by Boston Blackie	Chester Morris	
1949	Boston Blackie's Chinese Venture	Chester Morris	

== Radio ==
Boston Blackie—enemy to those who make him an enemy, friend to those who have no friend.

— Boston Blackie radio series

Concurrent with the Columbia Pictures films, a Boston Blackie radio series—also starring Chester Morris—aired on NBC June 23 – September 15, 1944, as a summer replacement for Amos 'n' Andy. Richard Lane played Inspector Farraday. Harlow Wilcox was the announcer for the 30-minute program.

A new incarnation of the Boston Blackie radio series aired April 11, 1945 – October 25, 1950, starring Richard Kollmar. Maurice Tarplin played Inspector Farraday; Jan Miner was Mary. More than 200 half-hour episodes were transcribed and syndicated by Frederick Ziv to Mutual and other network outlets.

== Television ==
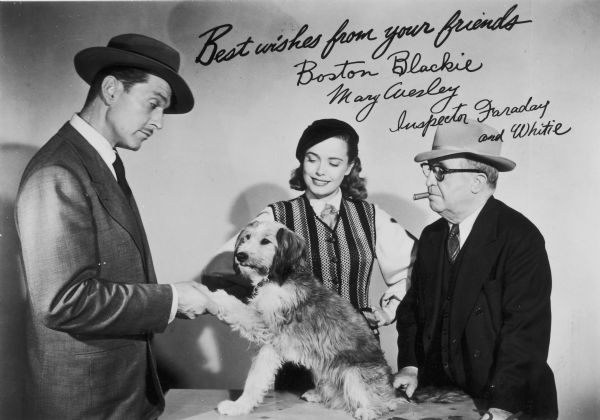
Kent Taylor (Boston Blackie), Lois Collier (Mary Wesley) and Frank Orth (Inspector Farraday) pose with Whitie in TV's Boston Blackie (1951–53)

Kent Taylor starred in the Ziv-produced half-hour TV series Boston Blackie. Syndicated in September 1951, it ran for 58 episodes, lasting until 1953, continuing in repeats over the following decade. Lois Collier appeared as Mary Wesley and Frank Orth was Inspector Farraday. The series was set in Los Angeles; Mary and Blackie had a dog named Whitie, and comedy sometimes took precedence over crime.

Television historian Tim Brooks in The Complete Directory to Prime Time Network and Cable TV Shows 1946–Present described Boston Blackie as "a memorable B-grade television series … The term 'B' is used in all the best senses: a certain vitality and sense of humor substituted more than adequately for the normal criteria of expensive production and famous stars."

== Graphic novels ==
Scripter Stefan Petrucha and artist Kirk Van Wormer created the graphic novel Boston Blackie (Moonstone Books, 2002) with a cover by Tim Seelig. A jewel heist at a costume ball goes horribly wrong, and the five-year-old son of the wealthy Greene family disappears and is presumed dead; the body is never found. The main suspect is Boston Blackie, who is still haunted seven years later by what happened that night. Drawn back into the case, he finds that the truth of what happened that night is awash in a watery grave. A sequel to the graphic novel was published years later.

== In popular culture ==
- In the 1955 film Tight Spot, Ginger Rogers exclaims "Well, aren't we the real life-size Boston Blackies."
- In a 1957 song "Searchin" by The Coasters, there is a reference to "Sergeant Friday, Charlie Chan and Boston Blackie" as popular detective characters of the era as a metaphor for the narrator's seeking a woman.
- A 1957 Daffy Duck cartoon, Boston Quackie, is a direct parody of the television serial, with Daffy as the detective – who needs everyone else's help to solve his case.
- Jimmy Buffett's song "Pencil Thin Mustache" references Boston Blackie, as do some versions of "The Wabash Cannonball".
- Boston Blackie's Restaurant was a bar and grill with locations in Chicago and Deerfield, Illinois.
- In a 1967 episode of Bewitched ("Samantha's Thanksgiving to Remember", Season 4, Episode 12), "Boston Blackie" is mentioned in fond remembrance by Aunt Clara (Marion Lorne), who confuses him as attending the First Thanksgiving with famous Pilgrims.
- In Errol Morris' 1988 documentary The Thin Blue Line, interviewee Emily Miller cites Boston Blackie as an inspiration for wanting to become a "detective, or the wife of a detective." The film's score by Philip Glass also has a cue titled "Boston Blackie."
- In Chuck E. Weiss's 2014 release, Red Beans and Weiss, track 3 is entitled "Boston Blackie" and comprises four verses, sandwiching three repetitions of the chorus; the chorus lyrics include "I'm just like Boston Blackie, yes I am", and, derived from the original stories, "Friends to those who have no friends".
- In a 2007 television episode of Mad Men, when talking about John F. Kennedy as a potential opponent for 1960 presidential candidate Richard M. Nixon, character Bert Cooper says, "It's going to be Kennedy. 'Boston Blackie' won West Virginia."
- In chapter 7 of the 2007 novel Now and Then by Robert B. Parker, Hawk refers to Spenser as 'Boston Blackie' after Spenser directs him to "Follow that car."

== See also ==
- List of police radio dramas
