= Maid to Order (1931 film) =

1931 American comedy film directed by Elmer Clifton

- Directed by: Elmer Clifton
- Story by: Doris Dembow; A. J. L. Parsons
- Music by: Jack Stone; Fred Thompson; George Beauchamp
- Production company: Jesse Weil Productions
- Distributed by: State Rights
- Release date: 1 September 1931
- Running time: 65 minutes
- Country: United States
- Language: English

Maid to Order is a 1931 American comedy crime film directed by Elmer Clifton from a story by Doris Dembow and A. J. L. Parsons. The film featured songs from Jack Stone, Fred Thompson and George Beauchamp. Julian Eltinge, who plays the lead role, was a well-known female impersonator.

== Plot ==
Detective Julian Eltinge is enlisted by the police to capture diamond smugglers. After the gang's European connection is arrested by Scotland Yard, the detective impersonates her, taking a job at a New York nightclub.
