= Dancing in the Dark (1949 film) =

1949 film by Irving Reis

Dancing In the Dark
- Theatrical Film Poster
- Directed by: Irving Reis
- Screenplay by: Mary C. McCall Jr. Marion Turk (adaptation); Jay Dratler (additional dialogue)
- Based on: The Band Wagon by Howard Dietz, George S. Kaufman, Arthur Schwartz
- Produced by: George Jessel
- Starring: William Powell; Mark Stevens; Betsy Drake; Adolphe Menjou
- Cinematography: Harry Jackson
- Edited by: Louis R. Loeffler
- Music by: Cyril J. Mockridge; Herbert W. Spencer
- Distributed by: 20th Century Fox
- Release date: December 2, 1949
- Running time: 92 minutes
- Country: United States
- Language: English
- Box office: $1.3 million

Dancing In the Dark is a 1949 Technicolor musical comedy film directed by Irving Reis, starring William Powell and Mark Stevens. Betsy Drake's singing voice was dubbed by Bonnie Lou Williams.

== Plot ==
This musical comedy stars William Powell as Emery Slade, an unlikeable actor who was once a major film star, but who has not worked in ten years. Slade tries to convince studio chief Melville Crossman (Adolphe Menjou) to give the female lead in the film version of a Broadway musical to an unknown, rather than the actress he was sent to New York to sign.

== Cast ==
- William Powell as Emery Slade
- Mark Stevens as Bill Davis
- Betsy Drake as Julie Clarke
- Adolphe Menjou as Melville Crossman
- Randy Stuart as Rosalie Brooks
- Lloyd Corrigan as John Barker
- Hope Emerson as Mrs. Schlaghammer
- Walter Catlett as Joe Brooks
- Don Beddoe as Barney Bassett
- Jean Hersholt as Jean Hersholt
