= Meet Boston Blackie =

1941 film by Robert Florey

- Directed by: Robert Florey
- Screenplay by: Jay Dratler
- Story by: Jay Dratler
- Based on: the character created by Jack Boyle
- Produced by: Ralph Cohn (uncredited)
- Starring: Chester Morris; Rochelle Hudson; Richard Lane; Charles Wagenheim
- Cinematography: Franz F. Planer
- Edited by: James Sweeney
- Production company: Columbia Pictures
- Distributed by: Columbia Pictures
- Release date: February 20, 1941
- Running time: 60 minutes
- Country: United States
- Language: English

Meet Boston Blackie is a 1941 American mystery crime film directed by Robert Florey starring Chester Morris, Rochelle Hudson, Richard Lane. Morris plays Boston Blackie, a notorious, but honorable jewel thief. Although the character had been the hero of a number of silent films, this was the first talking picture. It proved popular enough for Columbia Pictures to produce a total of fourteen B movies, all starring Morris. The next film in the sequence was Confessions of Boston Blackie.

Blackie's sidekick, a diminutive underworld type nicknamed The Runt, was slated for George E. Stone. Stone could not appear in the film, having contracted a virus, and he was replaced by Charles Wagenheim. Stone joined the series in the second film and stayed until 1948, when the series lapsed. (It was revived for one last film in 1949 with Morris, and sidekick Sid Tomack playing "Shorty.")

== Plot ==
Returning to New York City from Europe, Boston Blackie tries unsuccessfully to strike up a conversation with attractive fellow ocean liner passenger Marilyn Howard. He later rescues her when she is accosted by a man. However, when he tries to follow her, he runs into his friendly nemesis, police Inspector Faraday, who wants to take him in on suspicion of stealing some pearls. Knowing that Blackie's word is good (and that handcuffs are useless against him), Faraday merely confiscates his landing card.

However, when Blackie discovers the body of the man who had bothered Marilyn Howard deposited in his suite, he has to break his word and debark to clear his name. He trails Howard to the Coney Island amusement park. She has been followed by two men and is struck by a poisoned dart. Before dying, she tells him enough to send him to the Mechanical Man, a midway performer whose act is pretending to be a robot or automaton. Soon after, the two killers show up to report to their boss, the Mechanical Man, forcing Blackie to flee once again.

He hijacks the car belonging to Cecilia Bradley and manages to lose his pursuers after a high-speed chase. Cecilia decides to help Blackie, despite his attempts to keep her out of his troubles. They learn from a radio news broadcast that Howard was a spy.

Blackie eventually discovers that an espionage ring led by the Mechanical Man is trying to take a stolen navy bombsight out of the country. Faraday and his men follow Blackie to the midway to arrest him and prove handy in apprehending the spies. As a reward, Faraday decides to forget about the evidence linking Blackie to the theft of the pearls.

== Cast ==
- Chester Morris as Boston Blackie
- Rochelle Hudson as Cecelia Bradley
- Richard Lane as Inspector Faraday
- Charles Wagenheim as the Runt
- Constance Worth as Marilyn Howard
- Jack O'Malley as Monk
- George Magrill as Georgie
- Michael Rand as Mechanical Man
- Eddie Laughton as Carnival Barker
- Schlitzie as Princess Bibi
- Nestor Paiva as Martin Vestrick
