= Boston Blackie Goes Hollywood =

1942 film by Michael Gordon

- Directed by: Michael Gordon
- Written by: Paul Yawitz (original screenplay); Jack Boyle (character)
- Produced by: Wallace MacDonald
- Starring: Chester Morris; William Wright; Constance Worth
- Cinematography: Henry Freulich
- Edited by: Art Seid
- Music by: M. W. Stoloff
- Distributed by: Columbia Pictures
- Release date: November 5, 1942
- Running time: 68 min.
- Country: United States
- Language: English

Boston Blackie Goes Hollywood is a 1942 American crime film, fourth of the fourteen Boston Blackie films of the 1940s Columbia's series of B pictures based on Jack Boyle's pulp-fiction character.

== Plot summary ==
Boston Blackie and his sidekick The Runt are called, first to a Manhattan apartment where there's $60,000 waiting in a safe, then to Hollywood, by Boston's old friend Arthur Manleder to bail him out of gangster trouble. Naturally the police are suspicious and trail him every step of the way.

== Cast ==
- Chester Morris as Boston Blackie
- William Wright as Slick Barton
- Constance Worth as Gloria Lane
- Lloyd Corrigan as Arthur Manleder
- Richard Lane as Inspector John Farraday
- George E. Stone as The Runt
- Forrest Tucker as Whipper
- unbilled players include Lloyd Bridges, Ralph Dunn, Cy Kendall, Cyril Ring and Virginia Sale
