= George Tabori =

Hungarian writer and theatre director (1914–2007)

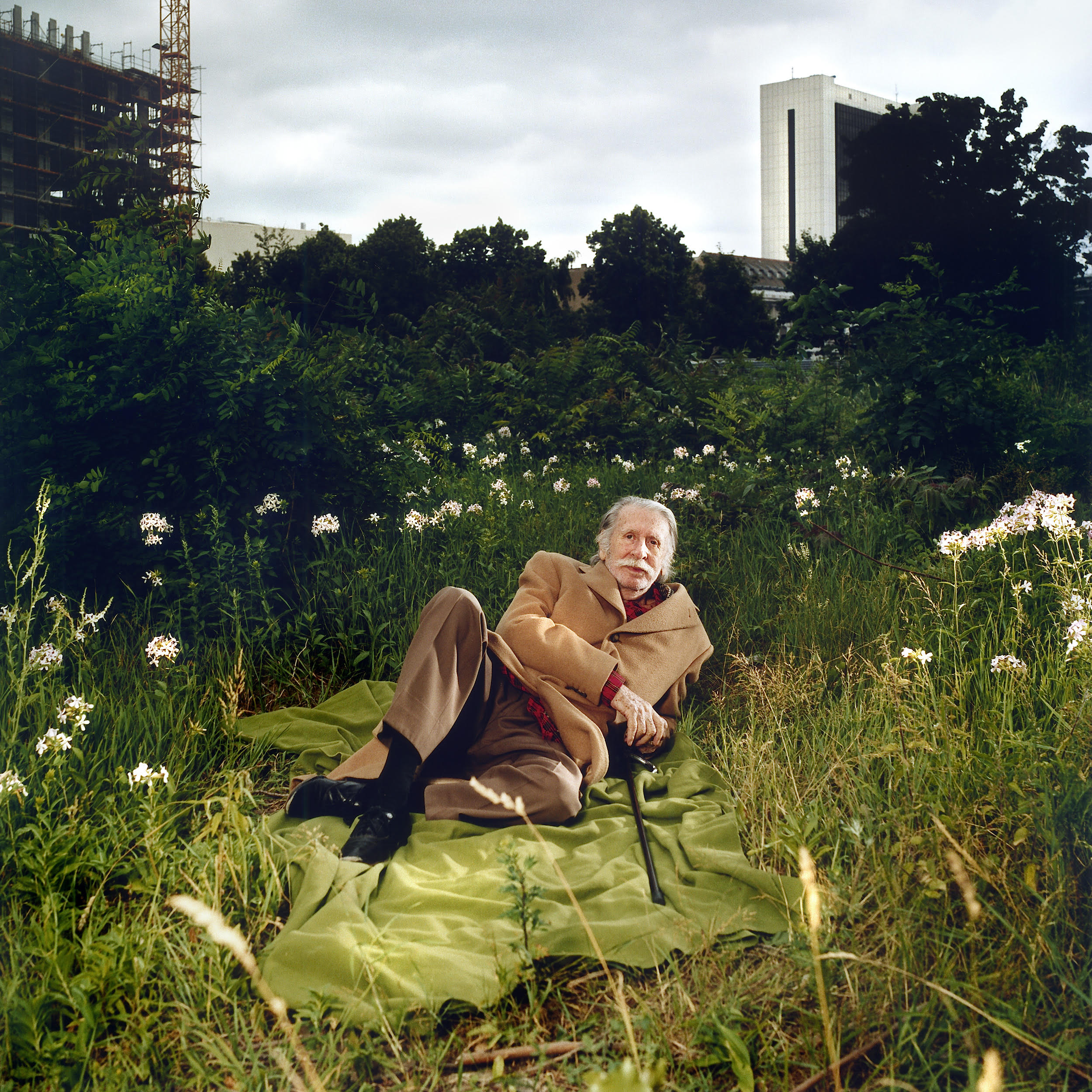
- Tabori in 2003, photo by Oliver Mark
- Born: György Tábori; 24 May 1914; Budapest, Austria-Hungary
- Died: 23 July 2007 (aged 93); Berlin, Germany
- Occupation: Writer
- Years active: 1950–2007
- Spouses: Hannah Freund (m. 1942; div. 1954); Viveca Lindfors (m. 1954; div. 1972); Ursula Grützmacher-Tabori (m. 1976; div. 1984); Ursula Höpfner (m. 1986)
- Relatives: Paul Tabori (brother)

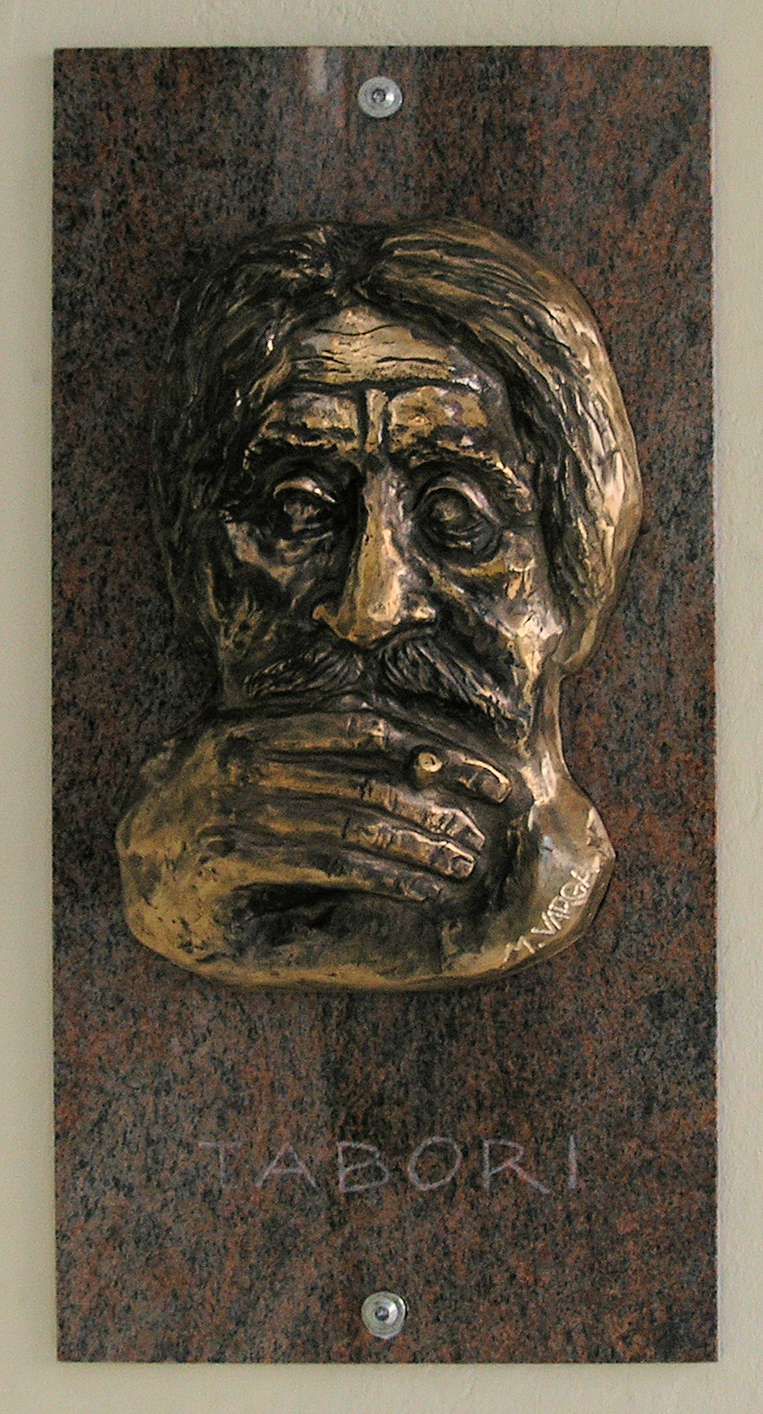
Memorial tablet at Schiffbauerdamm 6/7 in Berlin

George Tabori (né György Tábori; 24 May 1914 – 23 July 2007) was a Hungarian writer and theatre director.

== Life and career ==
Tabori was born in Budapest as György Tábori, a son of Kornél (Cornelius) and Elsa Tábori. He was raised as a Catholic, and was only told about his Jewish origin when he was seven years old. His father Kornél was murdered in Auschwitz in 1944, but his mother and his brother Paul Tabori (writer and psychical researcher), managed to escape the Nazis. As a young man, Tabori travelled to Berlin but was forced to leave Nazi Germany in 1935 because of his Jewish background. He first went to London, where he worked for the BBC and received British citizenship. In 1947 he immigrated to the United States, where he became a translator (mainly of works by Bertolt Brecht and Max Frisch) and a screenwriter including Alfred Hitchcock's movie I Confess (1953).

His first novel, Beneath The Stone, was published in America in 1945. In the late 1960s, Tabori brought his own and the work of Brecht to many colleges and universities. At the University of Pennsylvania he taught classes in dramatic writing which resulted in Werner Liepolt's The Young Master Dante and Ron Cowen's Summertree. His play The Niggerlovers debuted in 1967 starring Morgan Freeman and Stacy Keach. Two of Tabori's plays in English -- The Cannibals and Pinkville—were produced by Wynn Handman at the American Place Theatre in New York City from 1968 through 1970. A young William H. Macy made his professional debut in The Cannibals.His play The Prince was filmed by John Boorman as Leo the Last (1970) with Marcello Mastroianni and Billie Whitelaw; the film won the Director's Prize at the Cannes Film Festival in that year.

During his period in America, Tabori married Viveca Lindfors. In addition to his own child, Lena, with Lindfors, Tabori adopted Lindfors' two sons (from her marriage to film director Don Siegel), John and Kristoffer. Kristoffer later became an actor and Lena a publisher.

In 1971, Tabori moved to West Germany, where his new emphasis was theater work, and mainly worked in West Berlin, Munich, and Vienna. His 1991 Goldberg Variations is a satirical farce based on Biblical stories which end in disaster.

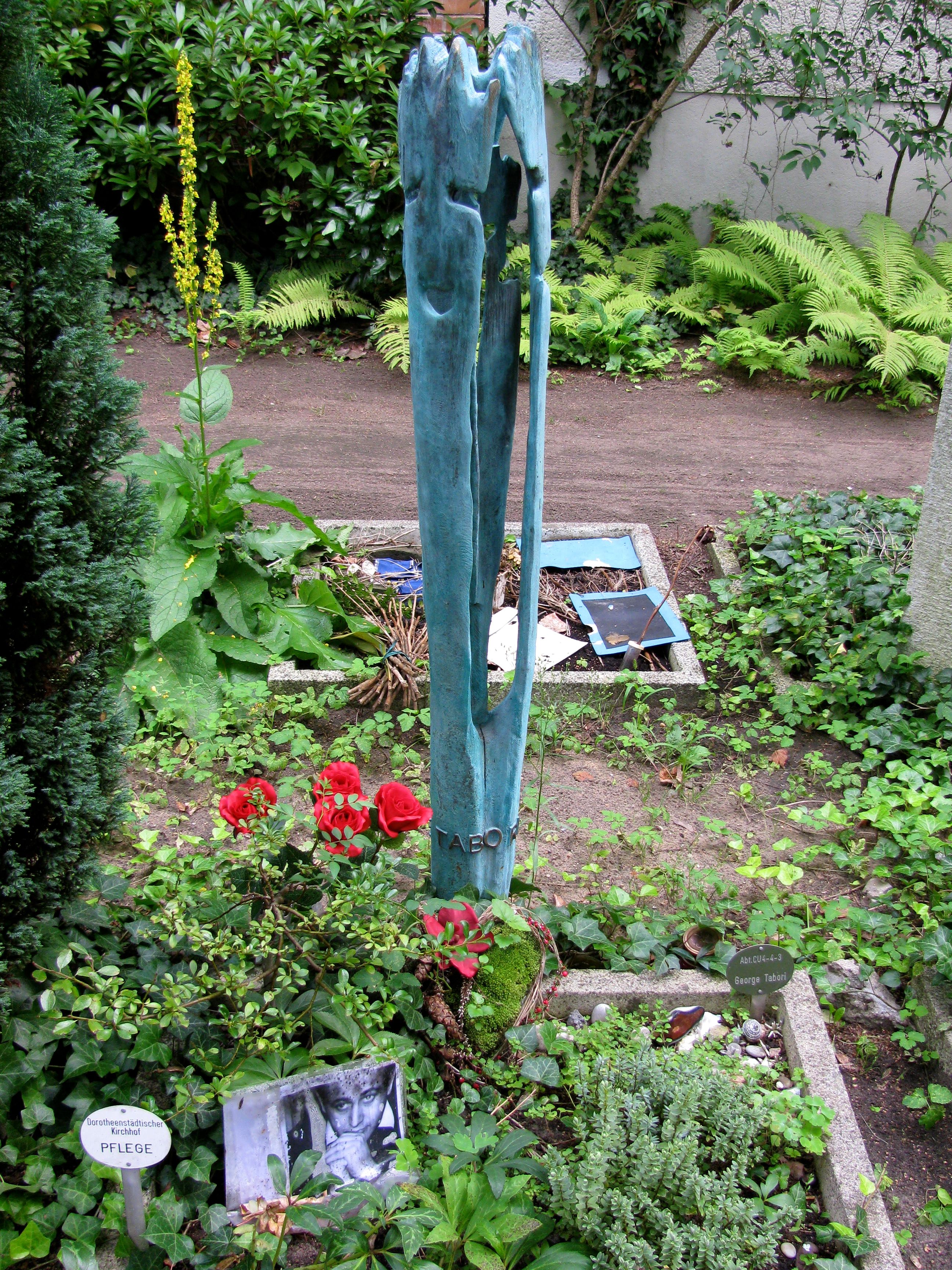
Grave of George Tabori, Dorotheenstadt cemetery in Berlin

He died in Berlin, aged 93.

== Plays ==
- Flight into Egypt (1952)
- The Emperor's Clothes (1953)
- Brou Ha Ha (1958).
- Brecht on Brecht: An Improvisation (1960)
- The Niggerlovers (1967)
- The Cannibals (1968)
- The Prince (1970)
- Pinkville (1971)
- My Mother's Courage (1979)
- Jubilee (1983)
- Goldberg Variations (1991)
- Mein Kampf (1993)

== Novels ==
- Beneath The Stone (1945)
- Companions of The Left Hand (1946)
- Original Sin (1947)
- The Journey (1958), novelisation of his screenplay of the film of the same name.
- The Caravan Passes (1960)
- The Good One (1960)
- Son of a Bitch (1984)
- Tod in Port Aarif (1995)

== Screenplays ==
- Thunder in the East (1951, based on the novel The Rage of the Vulture by Alan Moorehead)
- I Confess (1953, based on the play Nos deux consciences by Paul Anthelme Bourde)
- The Young Lovers (1954)
- The Journey (1959)
- No Exit (1962, based on the play No Exit by Jean-Paul Sartre)
- Secret Ceremony (1968, based on the short story Ceremonia secreta by Marco Denevi)
- Parades (1972)

== Other ==
- Open Wounds: Holocaust Theater and the Legacy of George (2022) Edited by Martin Kagel and David Z. Saltz - essays on Tabori

== Film adaptations ==
- Crisis (1950, based on the short story The Doubters)
- Leo the Last (1970, based on the play The Prince)
- My Mother's Courage (1995, based on an autobiographical story)
- Dawn of Evil: Rise of the Reich (2009, based on the play Mein Kampf)

== Awards and honors ==
- 1983 Mülheimer Dramatikerpreis
- 1990 Mülheimer Dramatikerpreis
- 2001 Kassel Literary Prize
- 2001 Nestroy Theatre Prize for Lifetime achievement

== Marriages ==
- Hannah Freund (1942–1954; divorced)
- Viveca Lindfors (1954–1972; divorced); 1 stepson (Kristoffer Tabori)
- Ursula Grützmacher-Tabori (1976–1984; divorced)
- Ursula Höpfner (1985–2007; his death)
