= The Lady in Question =

1940 film by Charles Vidor

- Directed by: Charles Vidor
- Screenplay by: Lewis Meltzer
- Story by: Marcel Achard
- Produced by: B. B. Kahane
- Starring: Brian Aherne; Rita Hayworth; Glenn Ford
- Cinematography: Lucien Andriot
- Edited by: Al Clark
- Music by: Lucien Moraweck
- Color process: Black and white
- Production company: Columbia Pictures
- Distributed by: Columbia Pictures
- Release date: August 7, 1940
- Running time: 80 minutes
- Country: United States
- Language: English

The Lady in Question is a 1940 American comedy-drama romance film directed by Charles Vidor and starring Brian Aherne, Rita Hayworth and Glenn Ford. It is a remake of the 1937 French film Gribouille.

This was the first of five films in which Ford and Hayworth appeared together, most famously in their second film, Gilda (1946). They also teamed together in The Loves of Carmen (1948), Affair in Trinidad (1952) and The Money Trap (1965). Their on-screen liaisons were soon transformed into an enduring, lifelong friendship.

== Plot ==
While serving on a Paris jury André Morestan (Brian Aherne) persuades his deadlocked peers to vote for the acquittal of Natalie Roguin (Rita Hayworth), a young woman on trial for the shooting death of a young man she had been seeing. Securing her acquittal, Morestan invites her to live and work at his bicycle and music shop when no one else will give her a job. However, he decides to keep her true identity a secret, which soon begins to raise doubts within his family. His son Pierre (Glenn Ford) soon falls in love with her, even though he knows who she is.

Eventually, Pierre steals some money from the store's till, and André is persuaded by a fellow former juror that Natalie was in fact guilty. He goes to the authorities, but learns from them that new evidence has turned up that completely exonerates her. All are reconciled and love wins out.

== Cast ==
- Brian Aherne as André Morestan
- Rita Hayworth as Natalie Roguin
- Glenn Ford as Pierre Morestan
- Irene Rich as Michèle Morestan
- George Coulouris as Defense Attorney
- Lloyd Corrigan as Prosecuting Attorney
- Evelyn Keyes as Françoise Morestan
- Edward Norris as Robert LaCoste
- Curt Bois as Henri Lurette
- Frank Reicher as President
- Sumner Getchell as Fat Boy
- Nicholas Bela as Nicolas Farkas
