= B. B. Kahane =

American film producer

B.B. Kahane
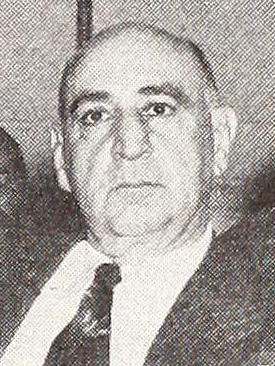
- Kahane in 1948
- Born: November 30, 1891
- Died: September 18, 1960 (aged 68); Las Vegas, Nevada
- Education: Kent College of Law
- Occupation(s): Producer, director

Benjamin "BB" Kahane (November 30, 1891 – September 18, 1960) was an American film producer.

== Career ==
After graduating from the Chicago-Kent College of Law in 1912, Kahane practiced several years as a lawyer. He entered the motion picture industry in 1919. He first worked as a consultant in legal matters and was promoted to general counsel, secretary and treasurer and member of the Orpheum Circuit, Inc.

When the Orpheum Circuit amalgamated with Keith-Albee in November 1928, he became secretary and treasurer of Radio-Keith-Orpheum. In April 1932 he became vice-president of RKO, president of RKO-Studios, Inc., and RKO Pathé Pictures Inc., in active charge of RKO Studios. He served first as executive film producer, for the film A Woman Rebels, 1936) with Katharine Hepburn.

He resigned from RKO in August 1936, and joined Columbia as vice-president in 1938. He produced Charles Vidor's The Lady in Question (1940), the first joint film of Rita Hayworth and Glenn Ford.

In 1957 at the 30th Academy Awards, Kahane received an Academy Honorary Award in recognition of his "distinguished service to the motion picture industry". It was presented to him by the actor Bette Davis.

In 1959 he was elected president of the Academy of Motion Picture Arts and Sciences. He held this office until his death the following year. During his tenure as the president of the Academy he presented the Jean Hersholt Humanitarian Award to Bob Hope and an honorary Academy Award to Buster Keaton at the 32nd Academy Awards.

== Filmography ==
- Love on a Bet (1936)
- A Woman Rebels (1936)
- There's That Woman Again (1939)
- Those High Grey Walls (1939)
- The Lady in Question (1940)
- Her First Beau (1941)

Non-profit organization positions
Preceded by George Stevens	President of the Academy of Motion Picture Arts and Sciences; 1959–1960	Succeeded by Valentine Davies
