= Thunder in the East (1951 film) =

1951 film

- Theatrical poster
- Directed by: Charles Vidor
- Written by: Frederick Hazlitt Brennan; Lewis Meltzer; Jo Swerling; George Tabori
- Based on: novel The Rage of the Vulture by Alan Moorehead
- Produced by: Everett Riskin
- Starring: Alan Ladd; Deborah Kerr
- Cinematography: Lee Garmes
- Edited by: Everett Douglas
- Music by: Hugo Friedhofer
- Color process: Black and white
- Production company: Paramount Pictures
- Distributed by: Paramount Pictures
- Release dates: January 6, 1952 (London); February 3, 1953 (New York City)
- Running time: 97 minutes
- Country: United States
- Language: English
- Box office: $2 million (US)

Thunder in the East is a 1951 American war film released by Paramount Pictures in 1953, and directed by Charles Vidor. It was based on the 1948 novel The Rage of the Vulture by Alan Moorehead; the book title was the working title of the film.

== Plot ==
The film is set in 1947 after India had gained its independence from Britain. Steve Gibbs (Alan Ladd), a former Flying Tiger is an American gunrunner who flies into the hill station capital of a small (fictitious) Northern Indian state called Gandahar. He intends to sell weapons to the local Maharajah whose capital is facing an attack from an opposing army. He is opposed by the Maharajah's prime minister Singh (Charles Boyer), who is a proponent of Mohandas Gandhi's philosophy of non-violence. Steve is initially forbidden by Prime Minister Singh from seeing the Maharajah, but Steve bides his time in the capital.

During his stay at a local hotel Steve is courted by a French adventuress (Corinne Calvet) who attempts to seduce Steve in return for flying her to Bombay. Steve falls in love with Joan Willoughby (Deborah Kerr), a blind woman who is one of the community of Anglo-Indians who have remained after Independence and the daughter of the local vicar (Cecil Kellaway). In return for Steve taking her on a picnic, she provides Steve with an interview to the thus far unapproachable Maharajah, who is convinced by the pacifist Prime Minister not to buy the weapons.

Stuck with his cargo of 20 Thompson submachineguns, 200 rifles and 100,000 rounds of ammunition, Steve considers selling his wares to the opposing army led by General Newah Khan (Philip Bourneuf) who has an undercover representative at the Hotel Gandahar, however Prime Minister Singh impounds the weapons.

Tension builds when a bus load of fleeing Anglo-Indian women and children have been ambushed and murdered. Irritated by the smugness of the Anglo-Indians, Steve charges an exorbitant rate to fly them to safety, leading Joan to despise Steve for his mercenary principles. Newah Khan's army lays siege to the capital with the Maharaja and all of the local populace escaping leaving the Prime Minister who refuses to use Steve's weapons, Steve and the Anglo-Indians to their fate in the deserted palace.

== Cast ==
- Alan Ladd as Steve Gibbs
- Deborah Kerr as Joan Willoughby
- Charles Boyer as Prime Minister Singh
- Corinne Calvet as Lizette Damon
- Cecil Kellaway as Vicar Willoughby
- Marc Cavell as Moti Lal
- John Abbott as Nitra Puta
- Philip Bourneuf as Newah Khan
- John Williams as General Sir Henry Harrison
- Charles Lung as Maharajah
- Leonora Hornblow as Tayhi, Joan's Maid
- Leonard Carey as Dr. Paling
- Nelson Welch as Norton
- Queenie Leonard as Miss Huggins
- George J. Lewis as The Bartender
- Aram Katcher as Servant
- John Davidson as The Hotel Clerk
- Trevor Ward as Mr. Darcy Thompson
- Bruce Payne as Harpoole
- Jill St. John as an English Girl (uncredited)

== Production ==
The film was based on war correspondent Alan Moorehead's debut novel The Rage of the Vulture, published in 1948. Moorehead got the idea for the novel after travelling through India in 1947.

The film rights were bought by Charles Vidor who sold them on to Paramount with himself as director. Alan Ladd was assigned to star with Robert Fellows to produce. Filming was postponed, however, so that Ladd could make Red Mountain. This meant Fellows dropped out and Everett Riskin became producer. "We have a tremendously large cast, fine settings as well as a splendid story", said Riskin.

Luther David was borrowed from MGM to write the script; then it was rewritten by Jo Swerling. Riskin was anxious to avoid offence to the British and Indians, and the novel was significantly altered.

James Mason and Alida Valli were discussed as possible co-stars for Ladd. Paramount ended up borrowing both Deborah Kerr from MGM to play the female lead and Corinne Calvet from Hal Wallis to support. Charles Boyer signed for the role of a Nehru-like politician; he had played a Japanese character in a 1934 French film also called Thunder in the East.

Shooting started on 26 March 1951.

== Music ==
The film's score was by Hugo Friedhofer.

Jay Livingstone and Ray Evans wrote a tie-in song for the film The Ruby and the Pearl that was recorded by Nat King Cole and others.

== Release ==
The release of the movie was delayed until 1953, in part because Alan Ladd had decided to leave Paramount and the studio wanted to spread out release of his final films for them.
