= His Family Tree =

1935 film by Charles Vidor

- Directed by: Charles Vidor
- Written by: Patrick Kearney (play); Harry Wagstaff Gribble (play)
- Produced by: Cliff Reid
- Starring: James Barton; Margaret Callahan
- Edited by: Jack Hively
- Music by: Alberto Colombo
- Distributed by: RKO Radio Pictures
- Release date: 1935
- Country: United States
- Language: English
- Budget: $127,000
- Box office: $116,000

His Family Tree is a 1935 comedy film directed by Charles Vidor.

== Plot ==
Patrick Murphy, is a former Boatswain and fondly called Bosun. He is retired now, and owns a pub in Ireland. Down hearted because he hasn't heard from his son in America for years but happy because that night he leaves for America.

In America his son has changed his name to Charles Murfee and is running for mayor.

Charles's wife is a snob who has created a fictional background where Charles' father is dead. She even has a portrait painted of Charles's father and had it hung over the fireplace in their elaborate living room.

When Bosun arrives at Charles' house it is just after the family is informed Charles may lose the Irish vote if he did change his name from Murphy to Murfee. Up to this point we haven't met Charles.

The butler, cook, everyone try to throw Bosun out, but his granddaughter intervenes. Once Charles and Bosun meet and the problem of the Irish vote is discovered, Bosun helps his son. Mainly with a fake pig in a car, in the middle of traffic pretending to be doing a radio interview for K-OINK. The pig looked amazingly like the current mayor.

This causes the Mayor to call out the big guns and during the debate, the granddaughter's spurned fiancé lures Bosun to an apartment building where he is beaten and tied up. Bosun however is able to get to the phone and, using his bosun's whistle, summon his friends to the rescue.

== Cast ==
- James Barton as Patrick 'Bosun' Murphy
- Margaret Callahan as Elinor Murfree a.k.a. Murphy
- Jack Randall as Mike Donovan
- Maureen Delaney as Nellie Quliken
- William Harrigan as Charlie Murfree a.k.a. Murphy
- Marjorie Gateson as Margaret 'Maggie' Murfree a.k.a. Murphy
- Phillip Trent as Dudley Weatherby
- Ray Mayer as Bat Gilligan
- Herman Bing as Mr. 'Stony' Stonehill

== Reception ==
RKO recorded a loss of $65,000 on the film.
