= Preston Foster =

American actor and singer (1900–1970)

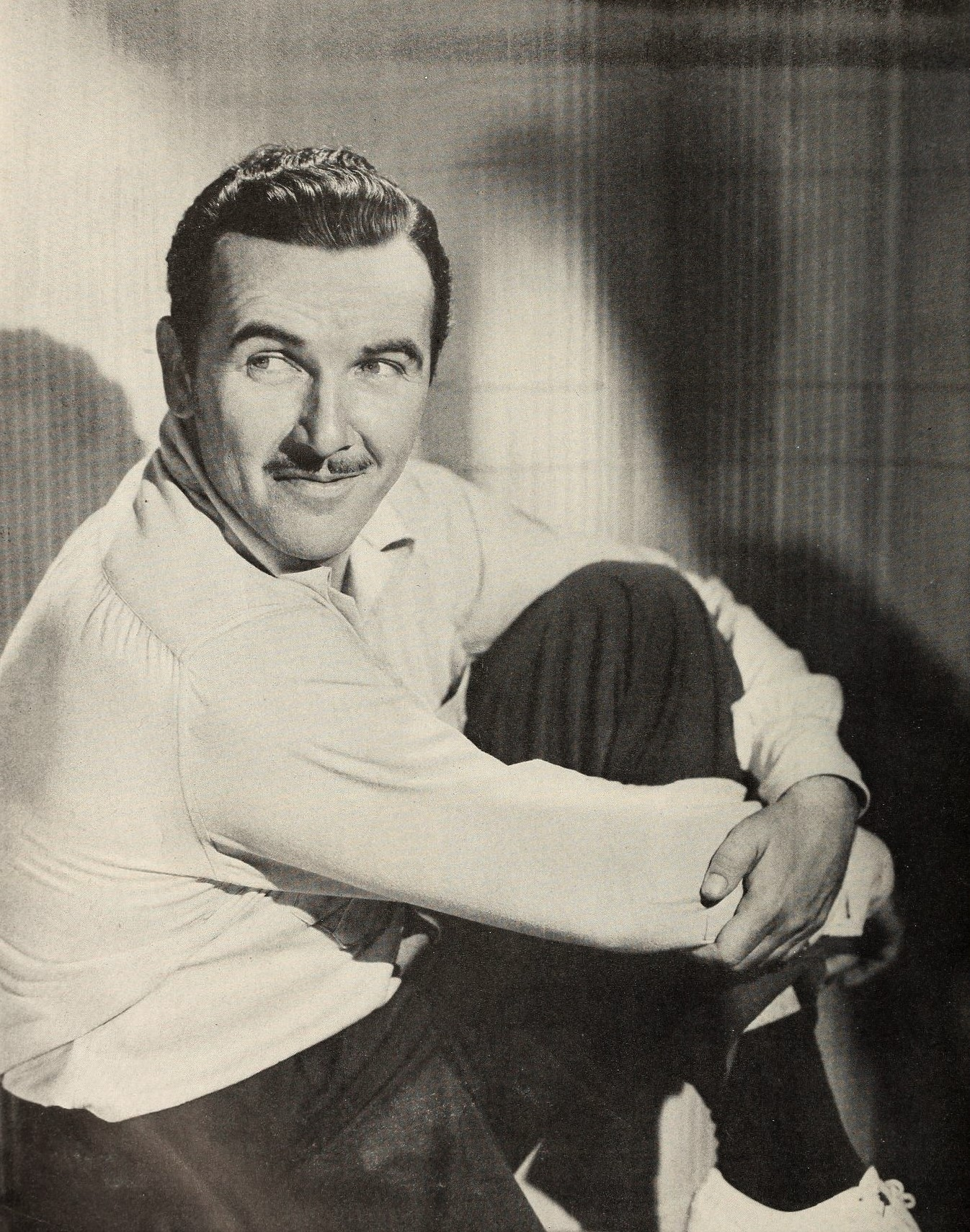
- Foster in 1941
- Born: August 24, 1900; Ocean City, New Jersey, U.S.
- Died: July 14, 1970 (aged 69); La Jolla, California, U.S.
- Occupation: Actor
- Years active: 1929–1968
- Spouses: Gertrude E. (Warren) Leonard (m. 1925; div. 1945) Sheila Darcy (m. 1946)
- Children: 1

Preston Stratton Foster (August 24, 1900 – July 14, 1970), was an American actor of stage, film, radio, and television, whose career spanned nearly four decades. He also had a career as a vocalist.

== Early life ==
Born in Ocean City, New Jersey, in 1900, Foster was the eldest of three children of New Jersey natives Sallie R. (née Stratton) and Walter Foster. Preston had two sisters, Mabel and Anna; and according to federal census records, his family still lived in Ocean City in Cape May County at least as late as 1910. There his father supported the family working as a painter. Sometime between 1910 and 1918, the Fosters relocated to Pitman, New Jersey, where Preston's father was employed as a machinist. The census for 1920 and Preston's earlier draft registration card from 1918 document that he continued to reside at that time at his parents' home at the intersection of Laurel and Snyder avenues in Pitman. Those records document as well that he had a job as a clerk for the New York Ship Company in Camden, New Jersey, located about 17 miles north of Pitman. A decade later, additional census records show that Foster had moved to Queens, New York, where he was living with his first wife, Gertrude, a widow and stage actress who was seven years his senior. The federal census of 1930 also lists Foster as an actor by then, one employed in "Legitimate Vaudeville".

== Stage and film career ==
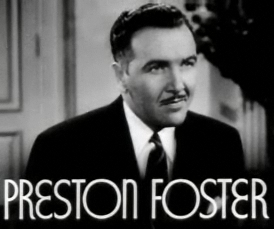
Foster in First Lady (1937)

Foster began working in films in 1929 after acting on Broadway, where he was still performing as late as November 1931 in the cast of Two Seconds. He soon reprised that stage role in Hollywood in the filmed version of the play. Some of his subsequent films include Doctor X (1932), I Am a Fugitive from a Chain Gang (1932), Annie Oakley (1935), The Last Days of Pompeii (1935), The Informer (1935), Geronimo (1939), My Friend Flicka (1943), and Roger Touhy, Gangster (1944).

Over the years, as Foster's film experience in Hollywood grew, producers and directors gained increasing respect for his ability to play an array of characters, ranging from the "snarling family‐deserting criminal" in The People's Enemy in 1935 to the soft-spoken, fatherly chaplain on the Pacific battlefront in the 1943 film Guadalcanal Diary. Once, when asked if he ever regretted performing in villainous roles, Foster gave some insight into his family's reaction to them:

I don't, but my mother does. Every time I do a part like The People's Enemy, she writes, ‘It was a nice picture, Preston, but do you have to play roles like that?’

Foster's career was interrupted by World War II, when he served with the United States Coast Guard. While in active service he rose to the rank of captain, and later he was awarded the honorary rank of commodore in the Coast Guard Auxiliary.

== Radio actor and vocalist ==
In addition to performing on stage and in numerous films, Foster was an accomplished singer who performed on both radio and in nightclubs, as well as a voice actor on radio. On July 25, 1943, Foster co-starred with Ellen Drew in "China Bridge," a presentation of Silver Theater on CBS radio. Foster also enjoyed a secondary career as a vocalist. In 1948, he created a trio consisting of himself, his second wife Sheila, and guitarist Gene Leis. Leis arranged the songs, and the trio performed on radio and in clubs, appearing with Orrin Tucker, Peggy Ann Garner and Rita Hayworth.

== Television work ==
In 1950, Foster began performing on the young but rapidly expanding medium of television. His first credited role on the "small screen" was in September of that year on the NBC anthology series Cameo Theatre, in an episode titled "The Westland Case". Later, after a few other appearances on series, he starred in the televised drama Waterfront, playing Captain John Herrick during the 1954-1955 broadcast season. He also guest-starred in 1963 in the ABC drama series Going My Way, starring Gene Kelly.

== Personal life and death ==
Foster was married twice, the first time to actress Gertrude Elene (Warren) Leonard, a widow who had been born in Woodbury, New Jersey in 1893. The two wed on June 27, 1925, in Manhattan, where they both worked as actors. In the early 1930s, the couple left New York City and relocated to Los Angeles. There, in 1939, they adopted a daughter, Stephanie; but six years later Preston and Gertrude divorced.

During times between his performances in films and on television, Foster often enjoyed boating and deep-sea fishing, especially for marlin, off California's southern coast. He continued to accept acting offers in his later years, although far less regularly during the final decade of his life. His last film credit was in the role of Nick Kassel in Chubasco, which was released just two years before his death.

During his later years, Foster lived in the seaside community of La Jolla, California, part of the city of San Diego. In 1969, when the San Diego Padres made their debut as a Major League Baseball team, Foster wrote a song titled "Let's Go Padres", which was billed as the team's official song. He sang it at some home games that season. Foster died in 1970 at age 69 in La Jolla after what The New York Times described as "a long illness."

== Honors ==
Preston Foster has a star on the Hollywood Walk of Fame at 6801 Hollywood Blvd.

== Filmography ==
- Pusher-in-the-Face (1929, Short) (film debut)
- Nothing but the Truth (1929) as Nightclub Patron (uncredited)
- Heads Up (1930) as Blake
- Follow the Leader (1930) as Two-Gun Terry
- His Woman (1931) as Crewman (uncredited)
- Two Seconds (1932) as Bud Clark
- Doctor X (1932) as Dr. Wells
- The Last Mile (1932) as John 'Killer' Mears - Cell 4
- Life Begins (1932) as Dr. Brett
- The All American (1932) as Steve Kelly
- I Am a Fugitive from a Chain Gang (1932) as Pete
- You Said a Mouthful (1932) as Ed Dover
- Sensation Hunters (1933) as Tom Baylor
- Ladies They Talk About (1933) as David Slade
- Elmer, the Great (1933) as Walker
- Dangerous Crossroads (1933) as Gang Leader
- Corruption (1933) as Tim Butler
- The Man Who Dared (1933) as Jan Novak
- Devil's Mate (1933) as Insp. O'Brien
- Hoop-La (1933) as Nifty Miller
- Just Around the Corner (1933, Short) as Tim - Office Worker
- Heat Lightning (1934) as George
- Wharf Angel (1934) as Como Murphy
- Sleepers East (1934) as Jason Everett
- The Band Plays On (1934) as Howdy Hardy
- Strangers All (1935) as Murray Carter
- The People's Enemy (1935) as Vince M. Falcone
- The Informer (1935) as Dan Gallagher
- A Night at the Biltmore Bowl (1935, Short) as Preston Foster
- The Arizonian (1935) as Tex Randolph
- The Last Days of Pompeii (1935) as Marcus
- Annie Oakley (1935) as Toby Walker
- We're Only Human (1935) as Det. Sgt. Pete 'Mac' McCaffrey
- Muss 'Em Up (1936) as Tippecanoe 'Tip' O'Neil
- Love Before Breakfast (1936) as Scott Miller
- The Plough and the Stars (1936) as Jack Clitheroe
- We Who Are About to Die (1937) as Steven Mathews
- Sea Devils (1937) as Michael 'Mike' O'Shay
- The Outcasts of Poker Flat (1937) as John Oakhurst
- You Can't Beat Love (1937) as James Ellsworth 'Jimmy' Hughes
- The Westland Case (1937) as Bill Crane - Private Detective
- First Lady (1937) as Stephen Wayne
- Everybody's Doing It (1938) as Bruce Keene
- Double Danger (1938) as Bob Crane
- The Lady in the Morgue (1938) as Det. Bill Crane
- Army Girl (1938) as Capt. Dike Conger
- The Storm (1938) as Jack Stacey
- Submarine Patrol (1938) as Lt. (j.g.) John C. Drake
- Up the River (1938) as 'Chipper' Morgan
- The Last Warning (1938) as Bill Crane
- Society Smugglers (1939) as Richard 'Sully' Sullivan
- Chasing Danger (1939) as Steve Mitchell
- News Is Made at Night (1939) as Steve Drum
- 20,000 Men a Year (1939) as Jim Howell
- Missing Evidence (1939) as Bill Collins
- Geronimo (1939) as Captain Bill Starrett
- Cafe Hostess (1940) as Dan Walters
- North West Mounted Police (1940) as Sergeant Jim Brett
- Moon Over Burma (1940) as Bill Gordon
- The Round Up (1941) as Greg Lane
- Unfinished Business (1941) as Steve Duncan
- Secret Agent of Japan (1942) as Roy Bonnell
- A Gentleman After Dark (1942) as Police Detective Tom Gaynor
- Night in New Orleans (1942) as Police Lt. Steve Abbott
- Little Tokyo, U.S.A. (1942) as Michael Steele
- Thunder Birds (1942) as Steve Britt
- American Empire (1942) as Paxton Bryce
- My Friend Flicka (1943) as Rob McLaughlin
- Guadalcanal Diary (1943) as Father Donnelly
- Bermuda Mystery (1944) as Steve Carramond
- Roger Touhy, Gangster (1944) as Roger Touhy
- Thunderhead, Son of Flicka (1945) as Rob McLaughlin
- The Valley of Decision (1945) as Jim Brennan
- Twice Blessed (1945) as Jeff Turner
- Abbott and Costello in Hollywood (1945) as Himself (uncredited)
- The Harvey Girls (1946) as Judge Sam Purvis
- Tangier (1946) as Col. Jose Artiego
- Strange Triangle (1946) as Sam Crane
- Inside Job (1946) as Bart Madden
- Ramrod (1947) as Frank Ivey
- King of the Wild Horses (1947) as Dave Taggert
- The Hunted (1948) as Johnny Saxon
- Thunderhoof (1948) as Scotty Mason
- I Shot Jesse James (1949) as John Kelley
- The Big Cat (1949) as Tom Eggers
- The Tougher They Come (1950) as Joe MacKinley
- Three Desperate Men (1951) as Tom Denton
- Tomahawk (1951) as Col. Carrington
- The Big Gusher (1951) as Henry 'Hank' Mason
- The Big Night (1951) as Andy La Main
- Montana Territory (1952) as Sheriff Henry Plummer
- Kansas City Confidential (1952) as Tim Foster
- Law and Order (1953) as Kurt Durling
- The Marshal's Daughter (1953) as Poker-Game Player #1
- I, the Jury (1953) as Capt. Pat Chambers
- Waterfront (1954-1955, TV) as Cap'n John Herrick
- Destination 60,000 (1957) as Col. Ed Buckley
- Gunslinger (1961, TV) as Capt. Zachary Wingate
- Going My Way (1963, TV) as Francis X. Finnegan
- 77 Sunset Strip (1964, TV) as Boss Gates
- Advance to the Rear (1964) as Gen. Bateman (uncredited)
- The Time Travelers (1964) as Dr. Erik von Steiner
- You've Got to Be Smart (1967) as D.A. Griggs
- Chubasco (1967) as Nick (final film)
