= Leo the Last =

1970 film

- Theatrical release poster
- Directed by: John Boorman
- Written by: John Boorman; Bill Stair
- Based on: The Prince by George Tabori
- Produced by: Robert Chartoff; Irwin Winkler
- Starring: Marcello Mastroianni; Billie Whitelaw; Calvin Lockhart
- Cinematography: Peter Suschitzky
- Edited by: Tom Priestley
- Music by: Fred Myrow, songs sung by Ram John Holder
- Production company: Caribury Films
- Distributed by: United Artists
- Release date: 11 May 1970
- Running time: 104 minutes
- Country: United Kingdom
- Language: English
- Budget: over £400,000

Leo the Last is a 1970 British drama film co-written and directed by John Boorman, based on the play The Prince by George Tabori and starring Marcello Mastroianni, Billie Whitelaw and Calvin Lockhart.

== Plot ==
The ennui-afflicted heir to a deposed European throne returns to his father's house in West London to find that the neighbourhood has become a slum. An ornithologist ill at ease with others, he finds his spy-glass wandering from birds to observe his neighbours. Strictly an observer at first, he increasingly becomes agitated as their lives are blighted by violence, poverty, and injustice. In particular, he is moved by the plight of young Salambo Mardi and her family, beset by the rapist shopkeeper Kowalski and the pimp Jasper.

Gradually he is stirred from his emotional detachment to try to assist her, a development that confuses, alarms, and angers his parasitic entourage: Margaret, his social climber fiancée; Max, the shady family lawyer (who for reasons never directly explained is desperate for Leo to marry Margaret); David, his quack doctor; and Laszlo, the household manager, and apparent leader of a secret society aiming to restore the dynasty. (Leo's sudden vitality also threatens Jasper the pimp who is, in fact, in league with Laszlo.)

A pacifist and liberal idealist with no interest in reigning, Leo is relieved when Laszlo confesses that the society is a fraud, but furious when he discovers that he himself is the owner of the slum and his life of wealth and privilege has been paid for from its rents.

Leo becomes the unlikeliest of revolutionaries, rallying the denizens of the slum with the aid of Salambo and her charismatic working-class hero boyfriend Roscoe. The intellectual and professional class (in the person of the socialite, the doctor, and the lawyer) is quickly overcome, but the capitalists and petite bourgeoisie (pimp, rent collector, shopkeeper, and real estate shareholders) prove tougher, fortifying themselves in Leo's mansion.

In the final cataclysm, Leo leads the mob in burning his own mansion to the ground, its occupiers surrendering and fleeing at the last moment. In the last line of dialogue, Roscoe tells Leo: "Well, you didn’t change the world, did you?” Leo replies: "No, but we changed our street". The victors laugh together and disperse. Leo wanders up to his old home and picks from the rubble one of his old spy-glasses. Smiling happily, he chucks it aside and skips merrily away.

== Cast ==
- Marcello Mastroianni as Leo
- Billie Whitelaw as Margaret
- Keefe West as Jasper
- Calvin Lockhart as Roscoe, The Pimp
- Glenna Forster-Jones as Salambo Mardi
- Graham Crowden as Max, The Lawyer
- Gwen Ffrangcon Davies as Hilda
- Vladek Sheybal as Laszlo, Leo's Aide
- Kenneth J. Warren as Kowalski (as Kenneth Warren)
- David de Keyser as David
- Brinsley Forde as "Bip"
- Ram John Holder as "Black Preacher"

== Production ==
The film was based on a play by George Tabori, who was married to actress Viveca Lindfors. She had been managed by Bob Chartoff and Irwin Winkler, who had turned into producers, and Tabori send them his script. They responded well and attached director John Boorman, with whom the producers had made Point Blank. Boorman suggested Marcello Mastroianni be cast in the lead. The film was turned down by MGM, Paramount, Universal and Columbia before being picked up by United Artists. Head of production David Picker agreed to finance even though he did not personally like the script.

== Reception ==
Although Boorman won the award for Best Director at the 1970 Cannes Film Festival for the film, the film has not yet been made available on DVD in the UK.

Stanley Kauffmann of The New Republic wrote: "Leo the Last is Marcello Mastroianni's first English-language film, and he should have stayed home. He is utterly wasted".

The film was a commercial disappointment on release. United Artists executive David Picker later said:

The film was worth making, but not at the price it cost ... no one had any money to lavish on creating an audience for a picture if there was the slightest doubt that it would find one lining up to see it. A film either made it – or it died. There was nothing in between. And Leo the Last didn't make it.

Arthur Krim of United Artists later did an assessment of the film as part of an evaluation of the company's inventory:

This director [John Boorman] had a very special reputation with campus film groups and youth orientated filmmakers in the United States and the United Kingdom. He was considered one of the voices of the new wave of picture making – daring, innovative, imaginative. This is the type of director motion picture companies were gravitating to in 1969 when it appeared that all traditional picture making was outmoded and audiences – mainly youthful – were ready to support only the off beat. By the time the picture was made, this premise had been proven erroneous. The actual audience for this type of film could justify a cost of only a few hundred thousand dollars, if that much – not the substantial budget allocated here, which in turn was exceeded by hundreds of thousands of dollars through the director's excessive preoccupation with his own ideas of "perfection". The picture came out much too long and slow but this director – as part of his unrealistic approach to picture making – refused to make necessary cuts. By contract he could not be overruled.

The film's exteriors were shot in streets – Testerton Street, and its crossroads with Baradon Street, near Leo's house, and, at the far end, its junction with Blechyndon Street – due to be demolished, immediately East and North-East of Latimer Road tube station in West London. Grenfell Tower now stands at the latter junction. The area has been realigned and landscaped, with walkways, trees and playgrounds, although the names of the three streets were retained for the 'walks'. The pub interiors were shot at the nearby Bramley Arms on Bramley Road, which is now (2019) offices and flats.

== Paperback novelization ==
Slightly in advance of the film's release (as was the custom), Award Books issued a tie-in novelization of the screenplay. The commissioned author, unlikely as a tie-in novelist, but no doubt chosen for the assignment based on his counter-culture profile, was Beat writer and gay activist Leo Skir.
