= Bradshaw Crandell =

American artist and illustrator

John Bradshaw Crandell
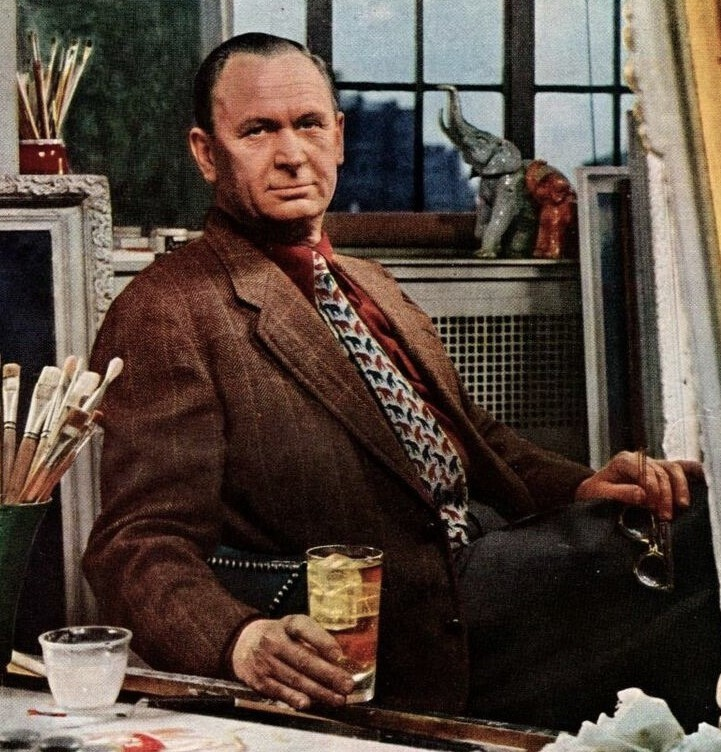
- Bradshaw Crandell in 1949
- Born: June 14, 1896; Glens Falls, New York
- Died: January 25, 1966 (aged 69); Madison, Connecticut
- Spouse: Myra Clarke
- Parent(s): Hubert Lee Crandell; Vira Mills

Bradshaw Crandell (June 14, 1896 – January 25, 1966) was an American artist and illustrator. He was known as the "artist of the stars". Among those who posed for Crandell were Carole Lombard, Bette Davis, Judy Garland, Veronica Lake and Lana Turner. In 1921, he began his career with an ad for Lorraine hair nets sold exclusively by F. W. Woolworth. His first cover illustration was the May 28, 1921 issue for the humor magazine Judge. In later life, he went from illustrations to oil-on-canvas paintings which included political figures. He also provided poster work for 20th Century Fox. In 2006, he was inducted into the Society of Illustrators Hall of Fame. In March 2010, an illustration for the 1952 Dutch Treat Club yearbook of Crandell's sold for $17,000.

== Early life ==
John Bradshaw Crandell was born in Glens Falls, New York in 1896, son of Hubert Lee and Vira (Mills) Crandell. Hubert's grandfather, born Peter Crandall, thought "the better way to spell the last name was Crandell instead of the original spelling used by the immigrant ancestor, Elder John Crandall. Crandell attended classes at the School of the Art Institute of Chicago but did not graduate. Instead he enrolled in Wesleyan University and again did not graduate. His 1918 World War I draft registration card noted he was a student. The twelfth general catalog of the Psi Upsilon fraternity lists him under the Xi Chapter for the year 1919 (from Wesleyan).

== Career ==
Crandall's career took off in 1921 with a contract for the cover of Judge magazine. Although he began his business as John Bradshaw Crandell Studios in 1925, he dropped his first name by 1935. He was known as a "glamour" artist and not necessarily a "pin-up" artist; however, he did have rather risque work, such as the two nude water nymphs and a nude cover for the Dutch Treat Club. In the 1950s, Crandall moved from illustrations to oil and portraits.

Crandall also created art for the Gerlach-Barklow Co., an art calendar factory in Joliet, Illinois.

Some of Crandell's work is on display in Vanderbilt Hall, a mansion hotel in Newport, Rhode Island owned by Peter de Savary. Phyllis Brown often graced the covers of Cosmopolitan and she was a well sought after model. An incident is told that Gerald Ford suggested the future Mrs. Betty Ford meet with two of his favorite friends when he heard of a trip she made to New York. Those friends being Mr. and Mrs. Bradshaw Crandell; however, when Phyllis arrived or as the future first lady put it later "In she slinked, Jerry's model" (Jerry had dated Phyllis) in a low cut very revealing outfit and then had the audacity to steal her escort. Both Crandell and Ford were innocent of any wrongdoing, though, as Phyllis admitted it was all her idea.

== Advertising ==
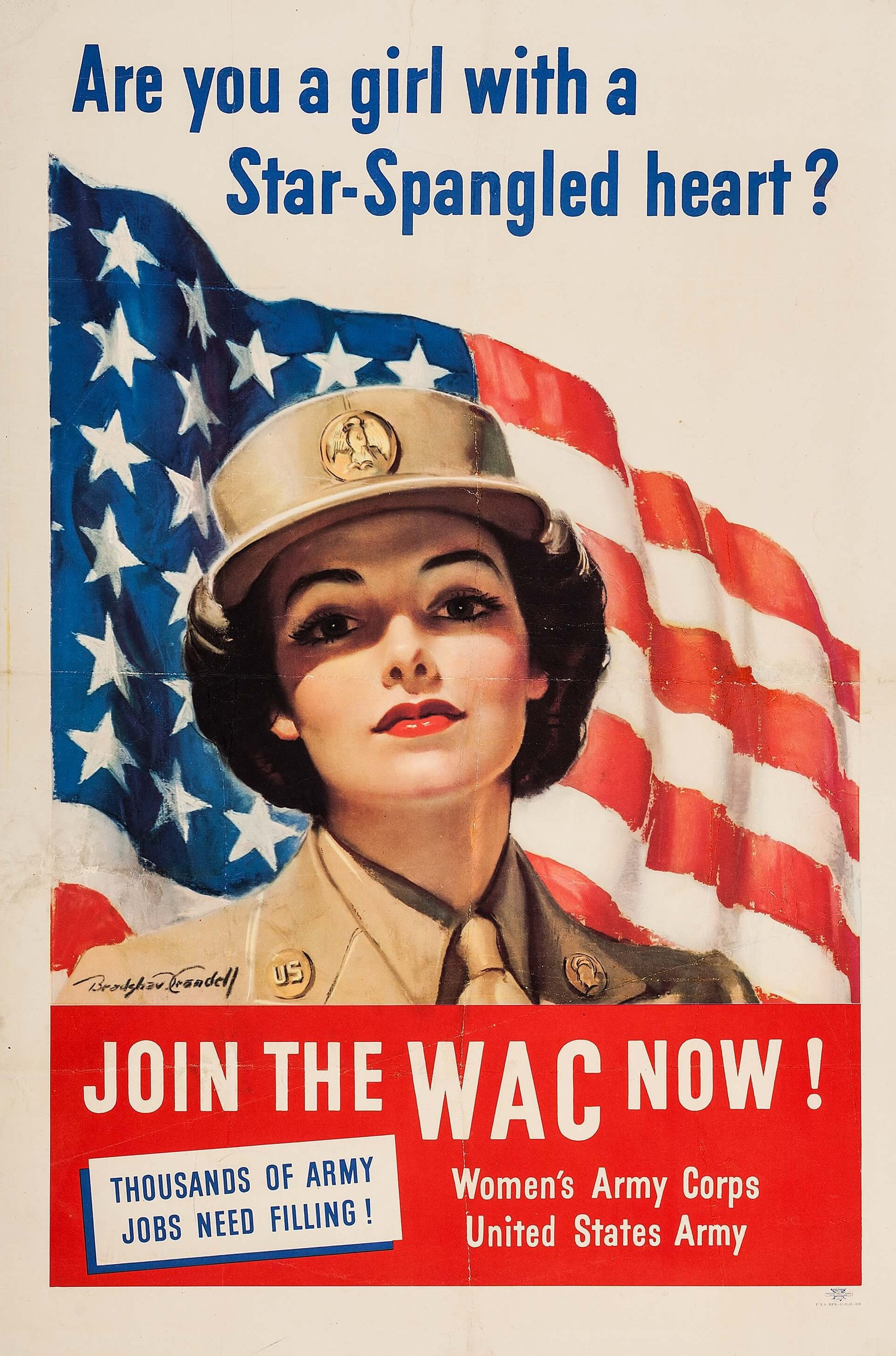
Are you a girl with a Star-Spangled heart? (1943)

The following is a partial list of some of Crandell's works and is by no means exhaustive:

- 1921: F. W. Woolworth's ad for Lorraine hair nets
- 1921, 1937: Chesterfield ad
- 1921: Judge (magazine) cover
- 1924-7: Collier's cover
- 1925-6: The Designer cover
- 1926-8, 1934-5, 1937: Saturday Evening Post cover
- 1926, 1928: Modern Priscilla cover
- 1927, 1931-2: Physical Culture cover
- 1928: Mazola Oil ad
- 1929: Cudahy's Puritan Bacon ad
- 1929: The Great Atlantic & Pacific Tea Company (A&P) ad
- 1930: College Humor cover
- 1930: Life cover
- c 1930: Old Gold cigarette ad
- 1931: Schrafft's candy ad
- 1931, 1933: Farmer's Wife cover
- 1932: Gerlack-Barklow calendars
- 1933: The American Magazine cover
- 1933: Palmolive soap ad
- 1935-1940, 1944-6: Cosmopolitan cover
- 1936: Buick ad
- 1938: Coca-Cola serving tray
- 1939: Lucky Strike calendar ad
- 1940: Pabst beer ad
- 1941: American Red Cross poster ad
- 1941-1944: John Player & Sons Cigarette ads
- 1943: Pontiac ads (honoring all arms and services of the fighting forces)
- 1943: Women's Army Corps recruiting poster
- 1944: Tangee face powder ad
- 1948: Edgeworth pipe tobacco ad
- 1948: The Loves of Carmen starring Rita Hayworth and Glenn Ford, Columbia Pictures theatrical release poster
- 1949: Lord Calvert whiskey ad
- unknown: Redbook only editorial or story illustration per Crandell himself

== Portraits, memorials, and other works ==
=== Stars ===
- Lana Turner
- Rita Hayworth and Glenn Ford
- Susan Hayward
- Judy Garland
- Veronica Lake
- Carole Lombard
- Bette Davis
- Olivia de Havilland
- Rosemary Lane, one of the Lane Sisters
- Gloria Callen
- Joan Bennett
- Joan Fontaine
- Anne Baxter
- Betty Hutton
- Jennifer Jones
- Lucille Ball
- Helen Twelvetrees

=== Politicians ===
- W. D. Hoard Jr., son of governor of Wisconsin
- Walter J. Kohler Jr., governor of Wisconsin

=== Others ===
- James Montgomery Flagg fellow artist who gave us the popular Uncle Sam poster of "We Want You for US Army"
- Betty Sullivan, daughter of Ed Sullivan

== External links and further reading ==
- Platnick, Norman I. "Roses of Romance: A Collector's Guide to Bradshaw Crandell", Enchanment Ink, Bay Shore, New York, 2003
- American Art Archives
- Curtis Licensing
