= Gene Leis =

American jazz musician

Gene Leis (April 19, 1920 – March 15, 1993) was an American jazz guitarist, teacher, bandleader, composer, producer, and entrepreneur.

== Early life ==
Leis was born into a musical family in Sedgwick, Kansas, near Wichita. His parents had a family band and played at local dances, weddings, and other events. When he was nine, he joined the family group on mandolin, an instrument whose neck was small enough for him to play comfortably. In his early teens he took up tenor guitar and began playing with other small groups. His father wanted him to play cello, and Leis negotiated a series of banjo lessons in exchange.

During the late 1930s Leis listened to the swing bands of Goodman and to guitarists Charlie Christian and Django Reinhardt. The introduction of the electric guitar changed the nature of the guitar player in dance bands so that they could play loud enough to be heard over the other instruments. He decided to focus on guitar.

== War years ==
In early 1941, Leis enlisted in the U.S. Army Air Corps in Galveston, Texas, and was sent to Muroc Army Air Field in the desert north of Lancaster, California. Later this airfield would become known as Edwards Air Force Base, but in 1941 it was an airfield used to teach maneuvers in bombing and gunnery.

While at the base, he took lessons from Dave Saunders, a student of George M. Smith, a studio and performing guitarist and author of George M. Smith Modern Guitar Method. These lessons formed the core of Leis's teaching system. Smith's method focused on teaching players the chord techniques for rhythm playing and improvising in contemporary jazz.

Promoted to staff sergeant, Leis formed Gene and his Jive Bombers. The band was composed of GIs and civilians and toured the area for the next three years. Leis arranged, directed, produced, and emceed at these appearances.

Leis was sent to India to organize entertainment for airbases in the China-Burma-India Theater of the war, playing in many different kinds of bands and at one time touring camps for several months with movie star and singer Tony Martin. Discharged in December 1945, Technical Sergeant returned to Lancaster and started a dance band.

== Preston Foster ==
In 1948 Leis met actor/singer Preston Foster and taught him some guitar. He was in a trio with Foster and Foster's wife, actress Sheila Darcy. Leis wrote the arrangements, and the trio performed on radio and in clubs, appearing with Orrin Tucker, Peggy Ann Garner and Rita Hayworth. He learned about performing from watching professionals. Foster broke up the trio and acted in the television series Waterfront. Tired of touring, Leis returned to Lancaster and sold real estate.

== The Nexsus Recorded Course ==
At night he worked on creating a self-taught guitar course on record that he would sell through the mail. The brittleness of the 78s meant they sometimes broke in the mail, and their weight increased the cost of shipping. After Columbia Records was successful with its mail order program, Leis decided his idea could work. He enrolled in a school of broadcasting to develop his narration skills, studied writing, photography, and print layout and composition. He used a Varitype machine to lay out and print pages. He called his course the Nexus Course and bought ads in Esquire, Playboy, True, and Diner's Club magazine. The Complete Nexus Method Course included records, an instruction book, chord book, and chord maps.

Tom Scanlan, jazz critic for the Army Times and DownBeart magazine, gave the course a favorable review.

Leis quit his job selling real estate to work on his mail order program. He moved to Manhattan Beach, California and in 1961 built a recording studio. In the first several years he sold 7000 courses and began selling chord books separately.

Leis's guitar style blended the rhythmic swing of his early influences with a melodic approach well suited to popular music of the 1950s and 1960s. Critics often described his tone as "warm" and "uncluttered" with an emphasis on chord-melody arrangements rather than virtuosic soloing. Through his courses and books, he helped introduce thousands of students to the fundamentals of jazz and popular guitar, and his emphasis on practical chord knowledge anticipated the boom in self-taught players during the rock era.

He favored common jazz progressions such as ii–V–I turnarounds, often reharmonizing them in unexpected ways to make his teaching examples both accessible for beginners and instructive for more advanced students.

With the encouragement and assistance of Jessy Stidham, one of his students, he introduced Play Guitar: Sounds of Today, designed to teach younger students how to play single string melody without going into complicated chords. He recorded the album Beautiful Guitar with a multitrack approach pioneered by Les Paul.

In 1963 Leis got his first distributor, in Boston. Within 10 years he had over 30 distributors and was distributing the books himself as well. In 1964, he incorporated Gene Leis Distributing with the aim of offering a full range of accessories and instruments. He designed or created a line of guitar amplifiers, which appeared under the names Rodeo Music or Gene Leis, guitars, and accessories, which were distributed by White Front, Montgomery Ward, and other retail stores. He sold over 8,000 amplifiers before leaving the crowded amp market.

In 1964 he revised the chord book, incorporating many more instructional elements, and called it the Instructional Chord Book for Guitar. He wrote Teacher's Pet Manuscript and Chord Diagram (Primary and Advanced) for students to write their own arrangements. By 1965, the Instruction Chord Book had sold over 250,000 copies. In 1966 he introduced Guitar for Two and Guitar for Fun.

To promote his courses, books and accessories, Leis toured the west coast with his sons, playing rock and roll and ballads. After the concerts, he hosted question and answer sessions that helped him determine the interests of guitar students. He considered comments and letters to be one of his greatest assets in developing courses and method books.

In 1965, Decca Records started a division known as Decca Home Entertainment Products, which for several years imported Japanese acoustic and solid-body electric guitars aimed primarily at the beginner market. Leis acted as an advisor to Decca, which sold over 30,000 of his chord books a year. Columbia Record Club bought 50,000 of his courses to pair with a line of guitars that it sold.

In 1966, Leis collaborated on the book A Guitar Manual with Daniel Mari and Peter Huyn. Published by E&O Mari, the manufacturer of La Bella guitar strings, the book focused on the history, anatomy, and use of the guitar. A year later he produced the albums Let's Duet and Learn to Play Guitar for Music Minus One, a company that created courses on record with one instrumental part missing so that students play along. During the same year he became a contributing editor for Guitar Player magazine.

By the mid 1970s, Leis had sold over 225,000 of his recorded courses and over two million copies of the Instruction Chord Book for Guitar.

The studio in Manhattan Beach was a recording studio, a distribution center, and a retail store. In the late 1960s he built small studios for teaching guitar lessons. His students included Jeff Linsky. In 1970 he recorded Gene Leis Plays Beautiful Music, also known as Music to Iron By.

Leis performed with guitarist Ron Anthony at Beach Bum Burt's in Redondo Beach, California. He retired in the 1970s, selling the studio and moving to Santa Maria, California, where he continued to sell his books, play at local clubs, and record others. He died in Santa Maria on March 15, 1993 at age of 73.

== Personal life ==
Leis married in 1943. He and his wife Leitha Leis had two sons, Larry and Bill, a daughter Gayle, and later, four grandchildren.

== Discography ==
- Play Guitar Volume 1: Sounds of Today (Gene Leis Studios, 1962)
- Play Guitar Volume 2: Sounds of Today (Gene Leis Studios, 1963)
- Gene Leis Plays Beautiful Guitar (One Star Project, 1965)
- Guitar for Two (Gene Leis Studios, 1966)
- Let Me Teach You to Play the Guitar (Music Minus One, 1967)

== Publications ==
=== Teaching materials and books ===
- Leis, Gene (1961). Nexsus Theory Instruction Book, Gene Leis Studio, Manhattan Beach, California.
- Leis, Gene (1961). Chord Book; Nexsus Theory, Gene Leis Studio, Manhattan Beach, California.
- Leis, Gene (1964, 1974). Instruction Chord Book for Guitar, Gene Leis Studio, Manhattan Beach, California.
- Leis, Gene (1964). Teacher's Pet Manuscript with Diagrams for Guitar, Book 1, Primary, Gene Leis Studio, Manhattan Beach, California.
- Leis, Gene (1964). Teacher's Pet Manuscript with Diagrams for Guitar, Book 2, Advanced, Gene Leis Studio, Manhattan Beach, California.
- Leis, Gene (1966). Guitar for Two, Gene Leis Studio, Manhattan Beach, California.
- Huyn, Peter; Leis, Gene; & Mari, Daniel (1966). A Guitar Manual. E. & O. Mari
- Leis, Gene (1967). Guitar for Fun, Gene Leis Studio, Manhattan Beach, California.

=== Songbooks ===
- Hartzler, Brian, and Leis, Gene (1970). Wine + Bread + Cheese, a Guitar and Thee, West Coast Publications, Los Angeles, California.
- Leis, Gene (1972). Makin' Tracks: Hit Songs for Easy Guitar, West Coast Publications, Los Angeles, California.
- Leis, Gene (1972). Country Guitar '72, West Coast Publications, Los Angeles, California.
- Leis, Gene (1972). Getting' Together for Easy Guitar (Collector's Series #34), West Coast Publications, Los Angeles, California.
- Leis, Gene (1972). What's Your Hangup?? A Guitar?? (Collector's Series #86), West Coast Publications Los Angeles, California.
