= Lewis Meltzer =

American screenwriter

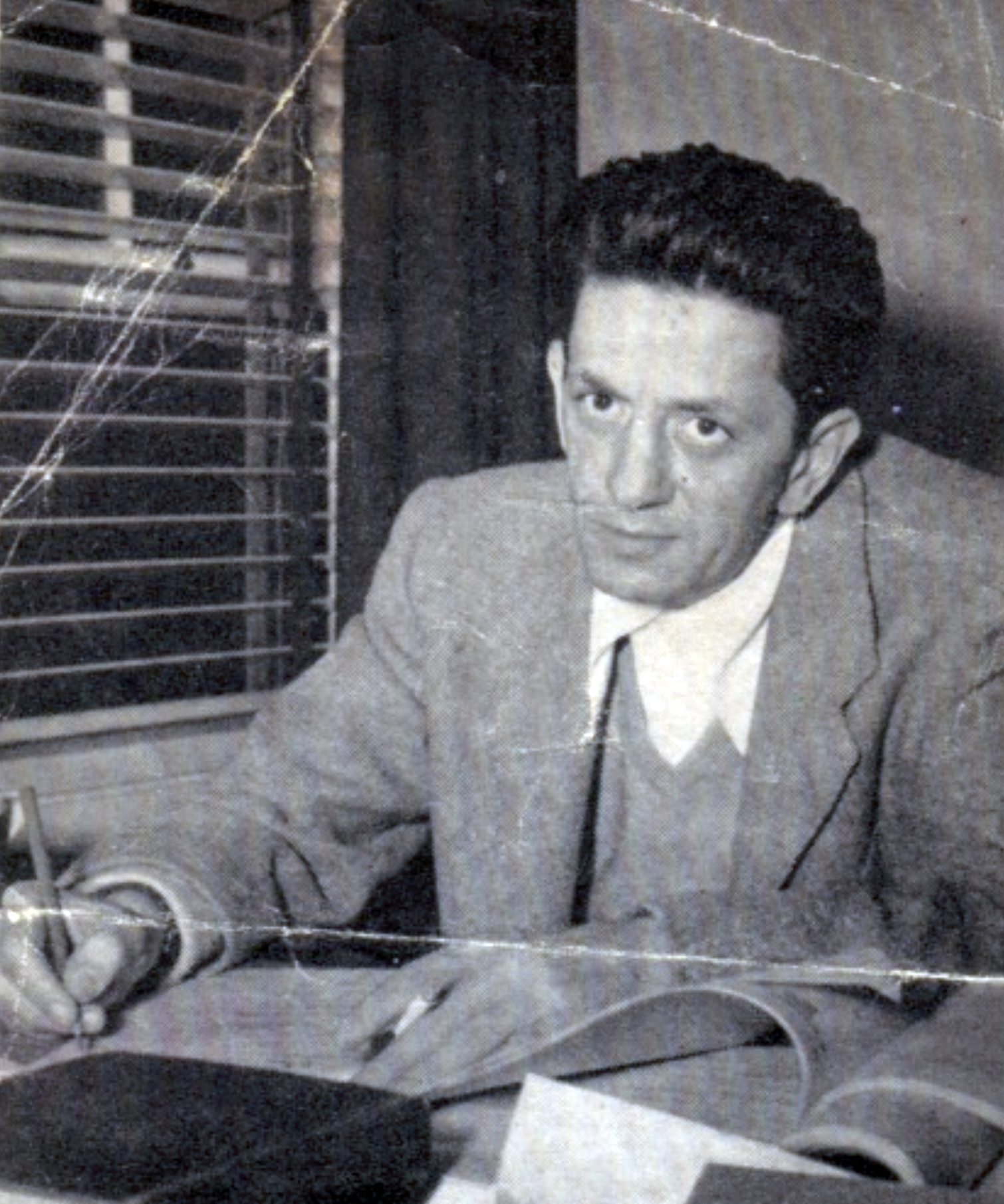
- Born: January 28, 1911; New York City, New York, US
- Died: February 23, 1995 (aged 84); Albuquerque, New Mexico, US
- Resting place: Mount Sinai Memorial Park Cemetery
- Occupation: Screenwriter

Lewis Meltzer (January 28, 1911 – February 23, 1995) was an American screenwriter and brother of actor Sid Melton. He died in 1995.

== Select filmography ==
- Golden Boy (1939)
- Those High Grey Walls (1939)
- The Lady in Question (1940)
- Texas (1941)
- New York Town (1941)
- The Tuttles of Tahiti (1942)
- First Comes Courage (1943)
- Destroyer (1943)
- Once Upon a Time (1944)
- Ladies' Man (1947)
- Man-Eater of Kumaon (1948)
- Texas, Brooklyn & Heaven (1948)
- The Lady Gambles (1949)
- Comanche Territory (1950)
- Along the Great Divide (1951)
- Thunder in the East (1951)
- The Jazz Singer (1952)
- Desert Legion (1953)
- Shark River (1953)
- The Man with the Golden Arm (1955)
- Autumn Leaves (1956)
- The Brothers Rico (1957)
- High School Confidential! (1958)
- The Beat Generation (1959)
