= Texas (1941 film) =

1941 film by George Marshall

- Directed by: George Marshall
- Screenplay by: Horace McCoy; Michael Blankfort; Lewis Meltzer
- Story by: Michael Blankfort; Lewis Meltzer
- Produced by: Samuel Bischoff
- Starring: William Holden; Glenn Ford; Claire Trevor
- Cinematography: George Meehan
- Edited by: William A. Lyon
- Music by: Sidney Cutner; Ross DiMaggio; Carmen Dragon
- Color process: Black and white
- Production company: Columbia Pictures
- Distributed by: Columbia Pictures
- Release date: October 9, 1941
- Running time: 94 minutes
- Country: United States
- Language: English

Texas is a 1941 American Western film directed by George Marshall and starring William Holden, Glenn Ford and Claire Trevor. Texas was an early picture for both Holden (his seventh credited performance) and Ford (his ninth). The film was designed by Columbia Pictures as a follow-up, though not a sequel, to the previous year's Arizona, which also starred Holden.

== Plot ==
Two Confederate veterans, broke and homeless, are making their way to Texas to start fresh. After comedic adventures getting into and out of trouble, just trying to make enough money to get to Texas, they witness a stagecoach robbery and manage to hold up the outlaws and take back the cash. At that point they have a difference of opinion; the "good" one Tod Ramsey (Glenn Ford) wants to give it back, the "bad" one Dan Thomas (William Holden) wants to keep it and keep going. Goodness wins out, and both are off the hook.

Tod takes a job with the biggest local rancher who has a beautiful and friendly daughter, "Mike" King (Claire Trevor). Dan stumbles into a different kind of job—with another rancher who specializes in rustling. They both have heads turned by the lovely lady and the battle of good and evil continues. The key to the action is the need to get the entire town/valley's cattle past all the rustlers up to the railroad at Abilene.

Dan is falsely accused of taking a shot at Tod. As he tries to escape the angry townsfolk, he shoots both the men behind the attempt on Tod's life, but he is shot and killed by the second one, Doc Thorpe, who is also the town's dentist. Tod appears at the door just after Doc Thorpe and Dan have shot each other. Tod closes the door to shield Mike's eyes from the sight of Dan's body. Ultimately, Tod and Mike go back to herding cattle together as they ride side by side while holding hands.

== Cast ==
- William Holden as Dan Thomas
- Glenn Ford as Tod Ramsey
- Claire Trevor as 'Mike' King
- George Bancroft as Windy Miller
- Edgar Buchanan as Buford "Doc" Thorpe
- Don Beddoe as Sheriff
- Andrew Tombes as Tennessee
- Addison Richards as Matt Lashan
- Edmund MacDonald as Comstock,
- Joseph Crehan as Rancher Dusty King
- Willard Robertson as Rancher Wilson
- Pat Moriarity as Rancher Matthews
- Edmund Cobb as Rancher Blaire

== See also ==
- List of American films of 1941

== Bibliography ==
- Fetrow, Alan G. Feature Films, 1940-1949: a United States Filmography. McFarland, 1994.
