= Everett Riskin =

American film producer

Everett Riskin (1895–1982) was an American film producer, best known for his work at Columbia and MGM, where he specialised in comedies.

He was the brother of screenwriter Robert Riskin.

== Partial filmography ==
- The Awful Truth (1937)
- I Am the Law (1938)
- Holiday (1938)
- The Amazing Mr. Williams (1939)
- Here Comes Mr. Jordan (1941)
- A Guy Named Joe (1943)
- Kismet (1944)
- The Thin Man Goes Home (1945)
- High Barbaree (1947)
- Julia Misbehaves (1948)
- Thunder in the East (1952)
