= Florine McKinney =

American actress (1909–1975)

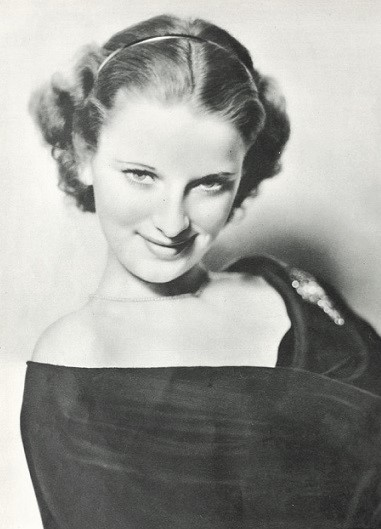
- Born: December 13, 1909; Mart, Texas, U.S.
- Died: July 28, 1975 (aged 65); Van Nuys, California, U.S.
- Occupation: Actress
- Years active: 1932-1942
- Spouse: Barry Trivers (1936–1940)

Florine McKinney (December 13, 1909 – July 28, 1975) was an American actress.

McKinney was the daughter of a druggist in Fort Worth, Texas. She gained early acting experience in Little Theatre productions and plays at Central High School in Fort Worth. A soprano, she also sang in five languages at concerts in Texas. Her musical talents resulted in a scholarship to the American Conservatory of Music.

McKinney received a contract from Paramount Pictures in 1931. Later, as a contract actor at Metro-Goldwyn-Mayer, she had the female romantic lead in Dizzy Dames. She also appeared in the films The Miracle Man, The Cabin in the Cotton, Cynara, Beauty for Sale, Dancing Lady, Student Tour, David Copperfield, Night Life of the Gods, Strangers All, Cappy Ricks Returns, Muss 'Em Up, A Star Fell from Heaven, Waterloo Bridge, Oklahoma Renegades, A Night at Earl Carroll's, You're the One, Unholy Partners, Brooklyn Orchid and Little Joe, the Wrangler, among others.
