= Little Joe, the Wrangler =

Film directed by Lewis D. Collins

- Theatrical release poster
- Directed by: Lewis D. Collins
- Screenplay by: Sherman L. Lowe; Elizabeth Beecher
- Story by: Sherman L. Lowe
- Produced by: Oliver Drake
- Starring: Johnny Mack Brown; Tex Ritter; Fuzzy Knight; Jennifer Holt; Florine McKinney; James Craven
- Cinematography: William A. Sickner
- Edited by: Russell F. Schoengarth
- Production company: Universal Pictures
- Distributed by: Universal Pictures
- Release date: November 13, 1942
- Running time: 60 minutes
- Country: United States
- Language: English

Little Joe, the Wrangler is a 1942 American Western film directed by Lewis D. Collins and written by Sherman L. Lowe and Elizabeth Beecher. The film stars Johnny Mack Brown, Tex Ritter, Fuzzy Knight, Jennifer Holt, Florine McKinney and James Craven. The film was released on November 13, 1942, by Universal Pictures.

== Cast ==
- Johnny Mack Brown as Neal Wallace
- Tex Ritter as Sheriff Bob Brewster
- Fuzzy Knight as Little Joe Smith
- Jennifer Holt as Janet Hammond
- Florine McKinney as Mary Brewster
- James Craven as Lloyd Chapin
- Wally Wales as Ben Travis
- Glenn Strange as Jeff Corey
- Jimmy Wakely as Jimmy Wakely
- Johnny Bond as Johnny
- Scotty Harrel as Scotty
