= The Man Who Dared (1933 film) =

1933 film by Hamilton MacFadden

- Directed by: Hamilton MacFadden
- Screenplay by: Dudley Nichols; Lamar Trotti
- Starring: Preston Foster; Zita Johann; Joan Marsh; June Lang; Phillip Trent
- Cinematography: Arthur C. Miller
- Edited by: Alfred DeGaetano
- Production company: Fox Film Corporation
- Distributed by: Fox Film Corporation
- Release date: June 30, 1933
- Running time: 72 minutes
- Country: United States
- Language: English

The Man Who Dared is a 1933 American pre-Code drama film directed by Hamilton MacFadden and written by Dudley Nichols and Lamar Trotti. The film stars Preston Foster, Zita Johann, Joan Marsh, Phillip Trent, and June Lang. The film was released on June 30, 1933, by Fox Film Corporation. Jan Novak is based on Anton Cermak, the Chicago mayor killed in an assassination attempt on Franklin D. Roosevelt in 1933.

== Plot ==
Mayor Jan Novak crusades to clean up a big city and fight the underworld.

== Cast ==
- Preston Foster as Jan Novak
- Zita Johann as Teena Pavelic Novak
- Joan Marsh as Joan Novak
- Irén Biller as Tereza Novak
- Phillip Trent as Dick
- June Lang as Barbara Novak
- Leon Ames as Yosef Novak
- Douglas Cosgrove as Dan Foley
- Douglass Dumbrille as Judge Collier
- Frank Sheridan as Sen. 'Honest John' McGuiness
- Leonid Snegoff as Posilipo
- Matt McHugh as Karel
- Jay Ward as young Jan Novak
