= The Amazing Mr. Williams =

1939 film by Alexander Hall

- Directed by: Alexander Hall
- Written by: Dwight Taylor; Sy Bartlett; Richard Maibaum
- Story by: Sy Bartlett
- Produced by: Everett Riskin
- Starring: Melvyn Douglas; Joan Blondell; Ruth Donnelly
- Cinematography: Arthur L. Todd
- Edited by: Viola Lawrence
- Music by: Morris Stoloff
- Production company: Columbia Pictures
- Distributed by: Columbia Pictures
- Release date: November 22, 1939
- Running time: 80 minutes
- Country: United States
- Language: English

The Amazing Mr. Williams is a 1939 American screwball comedy film produced by Everett Riskin for Columbia Pictures and directed by Alexander Hall. The film stars Melvyn Douglas, Joan Blondell and Clarence Kolb. It was written by Dwight Taylor, Sy Bartlett and Richard Maibaum. The film is about a police lieutenant who is too busy solving crimes to marry his longtime fiancée, who decides to take action and get him to marry her and settle down. The film was released on November 22, 1939.

== Plot ==
Maxine Carroll, secretary to the mayor, waits impatiently for Kenny Williams, who gets called away by Captain McGovern on police business not long after he arrives. Maxine has enough time to try to talk him into leaving the police force to start a family. Kenny joins Detective Deever and Lieutenant Bixler in the investigation of the murder of a circus performer, which Kenny solves with the arrest of a jealous knife-thrower.

Kenny has another date with Maxine, but this time the captain wants him to pick up Texas Buck Moseby at the jail and take him to the penitentiary by train. Instead of heading straight to the train, however, Kenny passes Moseby off as his college friend so he can keep his date with Maxine. Moseby is introduced to Effie, and the four go to the beach casino, then dancing later. Maxine suspects something is not right and calls the captain who tells her Kenny is on the train with Texas Buck Moseby, she informs him that they are both with her, which the captain does not believe. Bixler then tells the captain that the prison warden has called and said Kenny and Moseby have not arrived yet. The captain, who is still on the phone with Maxine, asks her to try to keep them there as long as possible. When the cops do arrive, Moseby tries to make a run for it, but Kenny is too quick for him and puts handcuffs on him. Effie faints when the captain announces that Buck Moseby is a notorious convict and killer.

Because of the incident with Moseby, Kenny is suspended for 60 days without pay by the police commissioner at the citizens committee meeting the following day. The Phantom Slugger, who has been fatally attacking random women on the street, has still not been caught, and the citizens committee is in an uproar about it. Captain McGovern suggests a male policeman wear women's clothes as a decoy to try to catch the criminal. Maxine writes a note suggesting they use Kenny and hands it to the mayor. The police commissioner is willing to reinstate Kenny if he will agree to go undercover, which he does. After 48 hours, Maxine is worried that neither she nor anyone at the police force has heard from Kenny, when they find out he has been spotted. Maxine goes to the location, but as soon as she sees Kenny the Phantom Slugger attacks her and knocks her out. Kenny struggles with the criminal, still in women's clothes, and arrests him.

Kenny visits Maxine in the hospital. She pretends to be sicker than she is and convinces him to turn in his resignation. The next day it is discovered that the night watchman at the First National Bank has been killed in a burglary worth $25,000. The captain finds Kenny's resignation but needs him to investigate the burglary, so Bixler pretends to have resigned as well to pique his interest in the investigation. Meanwhile, Maxine and Effie are planning a wedding for noon at the mayor's office, but Kenny is late as usual. The captain arrives and boasts that Kenny has nabbed the burglar, Stanley. Maxine calls off the wedding. Kenny arrives but it is too late.

Stanley insists he was forced to take part in the robbery by another man. Kenny discovers new evidence that might clear Stanley but he is supposed to take him to the prison by train. Meanwhile, the captain and detectives are trying to arrest Kenny for taking Stanley off the train. Kenny enlists Maxine's help in finding the person who purchased the liquor bottle found in Stanley's car, which leads them to the racetrack to arrest the real killer.

== Cast ==
- Melvyn Douglas as Kenny Williams
- Joan Blondell as Maxine Carroll
- Clarence Kolb as Captain McGovern
- Ruth Donnelly as Effie
- Edward Brophy as Buck Moseby
- Donald MacBride as Lieutenant Bixler
- Don Beddoe as Deever
- Jonathan Hale as Mayor
- John Wray as Stanley
- Peggy Shannon as Kitty
- Luis Alberni as Rinaldo
- James Crane as Johnny
- Dick Curtis as Joe
- Eddie Laughton as Mousey
- William Forrest as Anderson
- Walter Miller as Browning
- Barbara Pepper as Muriel, Wedding Guest
- Sally Payne as Jean, Wedding Guest
- Virginia Sale as Miss Mason, Schoolteacher
- Lorna Gray as Nurse
- Robert Middlemass as Police Commissioner
- Robert Dudley as Citizens Committee Man
- Frank Jaquet as Citizens Committee Man
- Sarah Edwards as Citizens Committee Woman
- Lela Bliss as Citizens Committee Woman
- Ralph Peters as Tobacco Store Proprietor
- Milton Kibbee as Liquor Store Proprietor
- Maude Eburne as Landlady
- Robert Sterling as Elevator Boy
- Wyndham Standing as Elevator Passenger
