= The People's Enemy =

1935 film directed by Crane Wilbur

- Directed by: Crane Wilbur
- Screenplay by: Gordon Kahn; Edward Dean Sullivan
- Story by: Edward Dean Sullivan
- Produced by: Burt Kelly
- Starring: Preston Foster; Melvyn Douglas; Charles Coburn
- Cinematography: Joseph Ruttenberg; Sam Levitt
- Edited by: William P. Thompson
- Production company: Select Productions
- Distributed by: RKO Radio Pictures
- Release date: March 15, 1935

The People's Enemy is a 1935 American crime film directed by Crane Wilbur, from a screenplay by Gordon Kahn and Edward Dean Sullivan, based on Sullivan's story. The film stars Preston Foster, Melvyn Douglas, and Charles Coburn.
