= Alexander Clifford =

British journalist and author

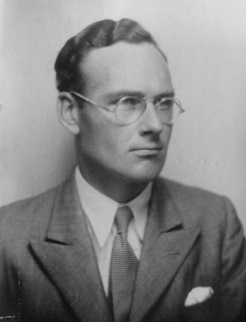
Alexander Clifford self-portrait

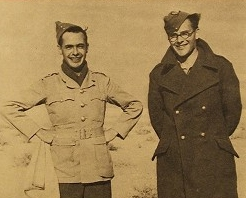
Alan Moorehead (left) and Clifford during the North African Campaign

Alexander Graeme Clifford (1909–1952) was a British journalist and author, best known as a war correspondent of the Daily Mail during the Second World War.

== Life ==
Clifford was educated at Charterhouse School and Balliol College, Oxford. He married the actress and journalist Jennie Prydie Nicholson (1919–1964) on 22 February 1945 in the Savoy Chapel, London; she was the eldest child of poet and author Robert Graves and Annie Mary Prydie "Nancy" Nicholson, elder daughter of the painter William Nicholson. (Note: Nancy Nicholson did not take Graves' surname when they married, and also insisted that her daughters bear hers.) Clifford was diagnosed with Hodgkin’s lymphoma in 1950 and did not reveal the condition to anyone except his wife. He died in March 1952 in a London hospital and is buried on the headland near Portofino, Italy.

== Second World War ==
Clifford was a war correspondent for the Daily Mail during the war. In June 1940 the Sunderland flying boat in which he was being transported beached near Malta to avoid sinking.

Clifford was a friend of Daily Express correspondent Alan Moorehead; they both covered the Spanish Civil War, and first met in the 'Bar Basque' in Saint-Jean-de-Luz in 1938). Moorehead wrote a great deal about him in his three books on the North African Campaign. They spent much of the war in each other's company during the Desert War, the Allied invasion of Italy and the Invasion of Normandy. According to one writer, "Moorehead and Clifford were complementary opposites, professional rivals as well as friends. Clifford was an intellectual European and a profound pessimist, uncertain of himself and the world. The expatriate Moorehead was driven by his curiosity, brilliance and eagerness to discover the world." Moorehead's memoir A Late Education: Episodes in a Life is, amongst other things, the story of his friendship with Clifford. Richard Knott's book The Trio (2015) is an account of Clifford's work as a war correspondent and his friendship with Alan Moorehead and Christopher Buckley.

== Books by Clifford ==
- Crusader, G. G. Harrap, London, 1942
- Three against Rommel. The Campaigns of Wavell, Auchinleck and Alexander, G. G. Harrap, London, 1943
- The Sickle and the Stars (with Jennie Nicholson), P. Davies, London, 1948
- Enter Citizens, Evans Bros, London, 1950
- The Conquest of North Africa 1940 to 1943, Kessinger, 2007
