= Peggy Drake =

American actress (1922–2014)

- Born: Lieselotte Mayer; 6 October 1922; Vienna, Austria
- Died: 19 September 2014 (aged 91); Santa Clarita, California, U.S.
- Occupation: Actress
- Years active: 1940–1942; 1970

Peggy Drake (6 October 1922 – 19 September 2014), was an Austrian born American film and television actress. She primarily appeared in B-movies of the 1940s.

== Career ==
Born Lieselotte Mayer in Vienna, Austria, she moved to the United States with her family at the age of three. Her acting career started with an uncredited role in the film Too Many Girls (1940). Her career was short-lived, appearing in five films between 1940 and 1942, most notably in the serial film King of the Mounties, a continuation of the King of the Royal Mounted film series.

While filming The Tuttles of Tahiti with Charles Laughton (on a sound stage in Culver City), Drake became seriously ill with pneumonia, delaying filming for two months, and causing her to lose so much weight that she had to adopt a diet of sweet potato pudding to regain her figure before filming resumed.

She left the business after 1942, but has appeared occasionally in film in uncredited roles. She appeared in one episode of the television series A Family at War (1970).

She died on 19 September 2014, aged 91.

== Filmography ==
Year	Title	Role	Notes
1940	Too Many Girls	Coed	Uncredited
1941	The Chocolate Soldier	Minor Role	Uncredited
1942	The Tuttles of Tahiti	Tamara	
1942	Sweater Girl		Uncredited
1942	King of the Mounties	Carol Brent	Serial, (final film role)
