= The Public Pays =

1936 film

- Directed by: Errol Taggart
- Written by: John C. Higgins
- Produced by: Jack Chertok
- Starring: Richard Alexander; Barbara Bedford
- Distributed by: MGM
- Release date: October 10, 1936
- Running time: 19 minutes
- Country: United States
- Language: English

The Public Pays is a 1936 short crime film directed by Errol Taggart. In 1937, it won an Academy Award at the 9th Academy Awards for Best Short Subject (Two-Reel). The film is a dramatization of actual court records that tell the story of a gang's racketeering activities in the milk industry and its eventual defeat through the heroism of one dealer.

== Plot ==
Three tough-looking men rent an office in Claybourne City and run the Creamery Betterment Association, a front for their extortion. They intend to force every dealer in the city to sign as members, with dues set at one cent on every quart of milk sold; the dealers will recoup the cost of the dues by raising the price of milk by three cents a quart.

The organization resorts to brutal tactics to force compliance from unwilling merchants. Only one dealer, John Paige, has the courage to refuse. He cooperates with the police but weakens when his family is threatened. Police persuade him to wait and replace all of his drivers with detectives, who arrest the gangsters when they attack the trucks. The police surround the gang, who are waiting in ambush to drill Paige's trucks with a tommy gun. This provides sufficient evidence and the gang is arrested and sent to prison for 50 years.

== Cast ==
In alphabetical order

- Richard Alexander as Drunken Hood Who Knocks Over Milk Wagon (uncredited)
- Barbara Bedford as Markovitz's Secretary (uncredited)
- Harry C. Bradley as Grocer (uncredited)
- Betty Ross Clarke as Paige's Secretary (uncredited)
- Russ Clark in a bit part (uncredited)
- John Dilson as Moore, Milk Company Executive (uncredited)
- Bess Flowers as Bit (uncredited)
- Karl Hackett as Markovitz, Milk Company Executive (uncredited)
- Robert Homans as Cop (uncredited)
- George Humbert as Simonelli, Italian Milk Dealer (uncredited)
- Cy Kendall as Police Chief John Carney (uncredited)
- Ivan Miller as Charles Paige (uncredited)
- William Pawley as Kelly (uncredited)
- Frank Puglia as Moran's Hood (uncredited)
- Edwin Stanley as John Allgren, Department of Justice (uncredited)
- Paul Stanton as Moran (uncredited)
- Ben Taggart as Cop (uncredited)
- Phillip Trent as MGM Reporter (uncredited)
- Emmett Vogan as Ardley, Moran's Assistant (uncredited)
- Frederick Vogeding as Dickman, Milk Company Executive (uncredited)
- Eddy Waller as The Association's Landlord (uncredited)
