= Phillip Trent =

American actor (1907–2001)

Phillip Trent (October 16, 1907, in Wilkes-Barre, Pennsylvania – January 24, 2001, in Englewood, New Jersey) was an American stage and film actor. He began his career on Broadway and starred in nine stage productions. He appeared in numerous films during the 1930s and 1940s. He also appeared as Clifford Jones.

== Filmography ==
Some of Trent's films include:

- Trick for Trick (1933) - David Adams
- The Man who Dared (1933) - Dick (as Clifford Jones)
- The Power and the Glory (1933) - Tom Garner Jr. (as Clifford Jones)
- Tillie and Gus (1933) - Tom Sheridan
- Coming Out Party (1934) - Jimmy Wolverton
- The Crime of Helen Stanley (1934) - Larry King (as Clifford Jones)
- The Most Precious Thing in Life (1934) - Fraternity Conductor (uncredited)
- Transient Lady (1935) - Fred Baxter
- Princess O'Hara (1935) - Tad (as Clifford Jones)
- Strangers All (1935) - Patrick Gruen (as Clifford Jones)
- His Family Tree (1935) - Dudley Weatherby
- Don't Gamble with Love (1936) - Bob Grant
- Wife vs. Secretary (1936) - Elevator Boy (uncredited)
- For the Service (1936) - George Murphy
- Parole! (1936) - Gregory
- The Girl on the Front Page (1936) - Edward
- The Public Pays (1936, Short) - MGM Reporter (uncredited)
- I Promise to Pay (1937) - Davis (uncredited)
- The Great Gambini (1937) - Reporter (uncredited)
- Youth on Parole (1937) - Don (uncredited)
- That's My Story (1937) - Reporter (uncredited)
- A Doctor's Diary (1937)
- The Spy Ring (1938) - Captain Robert Scott
- Letter of Introduction (1938) - Man at Barry's Party (uncredited)
- I Am the Law (1938) - Law Student (uncredited)
- Flirting with Fate (1938) - Larry
- Pirates of the Skies (1939) - Pilot (uncredited)
- Let Us Live (1939) - Frank Burke
- Buck Rogers (1939, Serial) - Mitchell [Ch. 1] (uncredited)
- When Tomorrow Comes (1939) - Service Man (uncredited)
- Drunk Driving (1939, Short) - MGM Crime Reporter (uncredited)
- Gone with the Wind (1939) - Gentleman / Bearded Confederate on Steps of Tara (uncredited)
- Ninotchka (1939)
- The Green Hornet (1940, Serial) - Jasper Jenks
- Those Were the Days! (1940) - Clerk (uncredited)
- The Great Train Robbery (1941) - Carbine (uncredited)
- Back in the Saddle (1941) - Jack (uncredited)
- Paper Bullets (1941) - Harold DeWitt
- Murder by Invitation (1941) - Larry Denham
- Outlaws of Cherokee Trail (1941) - Fake Jim Warren
- Bombay Clipper (1942) - Tom Hare (final film role)
