= Those High Grey Walls =

1939 film by Charles Vidor

These High Grey Walls
- Directed by: Charles Vidor
- Screenplay by: Lewis Meltzer; Gladys Lehman
- Story by: William A. Wellman
- Produced by: B. B. Kahane
- Starring: Walter Connolly; Onslow Stevens; Iris Meredith
- Cinematography: John Stumar
- Edited by: Gene Milford
- Color process: Black and white
- Production company: Columbia Pictures
- Distributed by: Columbia Pictures
- Release date: September 21, 1939
- Running time: 80 minutes
- Country: United States
- Language: English

Those High Grey Walls is a 1939 American crime film directed by Charles Vidor and starring Walter Connolly, Onslow Stevens and Iris Meredith. Produced and distributed by Columbia Pictures, it is also known by the alternative title The Gates of Alcatraz.

== Plot ==
Dr. MacAuley, a kindly beloved country doctor, is sent to Fillmore Prison. His crime was for removing a bullet from a young man who was escaping from the police.

== Cast ==
- Walter Connolly as Dr. MacAuley
- Onslow Stevens as Dr. Frank Norton
- Paul Fix as Nightingale
- Bernard Nedell as Redlands
- Iris Meredith as Mary MacAuley
- Oscar O'Shea as Warden
- Nicholas Soussanin as "Lindy" Lindstrom
- Don Beddoe as Jockey
