= Strangers All =

1935 film directed by Charles Vidor

- Directed by: Charles Vidor
- Written by: Milton Krims
- Produced by: Cliff Reid
- Starring: May Robson; Preston Foster; Florine McKinney
- Cinematography: John W. Boyle
- Edited by: Jack Hively
- Music by: Roy Webb
- Production company: RKO Radio Pictures
- Distributed by: RKO Radio Pictures
- Release date: April 26, 1935 (US)
- Running time: 70 minutes
- Country: United States
- Language: English

Strangers All is a 1935 American drama film directed by Charles Vidor from a screenplay by Milton Krims. The film stars May Robson and Preston Foster, and was released by RKO Radio Pictures on April 26, 1935.

== Cast ==
- May Robson as Anna Carter
- Preston Foster as Murray Carter
- Florine McKinney as Lily Carter
- William Bakewell as Dick Carter
- James Bush as Lewis Carter
- Samuel S. Hinds as Charles Green
- Phillip Trent as Patrick Gruen
- Suzanne Kaaren as Frances Farrell
- Leon Ames as Frank Walker
- Reginald Barlow as Judge
- Paul Stanton as Prosecuting Attorney
