= The Tuttles of Tahiti =

1942 film by Charles Vidor

- theatrical poster
- Directed by: Charles Vidor
- Written by: Lewis Meltzer; Robert Carson; James Hilton (adaptation)
- Based on: novel: No More Gas by James Norman Hall; Charles Nordhoff
- Produced by: Sol Lesser
- Starring: Charles Laughton
- Cinematography: Nicholas Musuraca
- Edited by: Frederic Knudtson
- Music by: Roy Webb
- Production company: Sol Lesser Productions
- Distributed by: RKO Radio Pictures
- Release date: May 1, 1942 (U.S.)
- Running time: 91 minutes
- Country: United States
- Language: English
- Budget: $847,000

The Tuttles of Tahiti is a 1942 American adventure comedy romance film directed by Charles Vidor and starring Charles Laughton and Jon Hall. It was based on the novel No More Gas by James Norman Hall and Charles Nordhoff.

According to one reviewer the film was "not really a South Seas movie so much as a “wacky family” tale, with Hall as the son of paterfamilias Charles Laughton. You can see what the filmmakers are going for but despite a healthy budget and talented people involved...the film is marred by odd decisions (the film noir-like photography, Laughton’s make-up, the lack of a decent romance and action for Hall). It lost RKO money, which may explain why this was the last time Hall depicted a Pacific Islander on screen."

== Plot ==
When merchant sailor Chester Tuttle (Jon Hall) returns home to Tahiti after several years away, his family, headed by Jonas Tuttle (Charles Laughton), welcomes him with open arms. The Tuttles are a happy-go-lucky bunch who give little thought to the future and do as little work as necessary. Jonas often gets loans, which he never gets around to paying back, from Dr. Blondin (Victor Francen). Chester has brought with him a fighting rooster for Jonas's cockfight with the more industrious and prosperous Emily (Florence Bates).

Shrewd businessman Jensen (Curt Bois) persuades the doctor to transfer Jonas's debt to him. Jonas is so sure that Chester's rooster will win that he willingly signs a mortgage for the rundown family mansion and bets everything on the outcome. However, the bird turns out be a coward and flees the ring without a fight.

Chester notices that Emily's daughter Tamara (Peggy Drake) has grown into a beautiful young woman, but the young lovers realize that Emily will never sanction Tamara's marriage to a penniless wastrel.

To raise the mortgage payment, Chester, his brothers and nephew go fishing on their boat. When a storm comes up, they are presumed lost. However, not only are they safe, they find an abandoned ship. They bring it in, and under salvage laws, they are now its owners. Jensen buys it and its cargo for 400,000 francs, an enormous sum.

Ignoring Emily's advice to invest the money, Jonas deposits it in a joint checking account, withdraws just enough to pay back Dr. Blondin, and gives checkbooks to everyone in the family. With their new wealth, Chester is able to marry Tamara. However, creditors descend on Jonas, and the spendthrift Tuttles soon spend the rest of their money very quickly.

When Jensen comes to collect the mortgage, Jonas cannot find the money he had saved for Blondin, and Jensen takes possession of the mansion. While chasing Chester's rooster, he finds the misplaced money and triumphantly gives it to Blondin, saving the Tuttle home. In the end, Blondin gives Jonas a new loan to buy gas for the fishing boat.

== Cast ==
- Charles Laughton as Jonas Tuttle
- Jon Hall as Chester Tuttle
- Peggy Drake as Tamara
- Victor Francen as Dr. Blondin
- Gene Reynolds as Ru Tuttle, Jonas's grandson
- Florence Bates as Emily
- Curt Bois as Jensen
- Adeline De Walt Reynolds as Mama Ruau, Jonas's mother
- Ray Mala as Nat

== Reception ==
The film recorded a loss of $170,000.
