= Don't Gamble with Love =

1936 film by Dudley Murphy

- Directed by: Dudley Murphy
- Written by: Harold Buchman; Lee Loeb
- Starring: Ann Sothern; Bruce Cabot; Irving Pichel
- Cinematography: Henry Freulich
- Edited by: James Sweeney
- Production company: Columbia Pictures
- Distributed by: Columbia Pictures
- Release date: February 28, 1936
- Running time: 65 minutes
- Country: United States
- Language: English

Don't Gamble with Love is a 1936 American drama film directed by Dudley Murphy and starring Ann Sothern, Bruce Cabot and Irving Pichel.

== Cast ==
- Ann Sothern as Ann Edwards
- Bruce Cabot as Jerry Edwards
- Irving Pichel as Rick Collins
- Ian Keith as John Crane
- Thurston Hall as Martin Gage
- Elisabeth Risdon as Grace
- Phillip Trent as Bob Grant
- Franklin Pangborn as Salesman

== Bibliography ==
- Susan Delson. Dudley Murphy, Hollywood Wild Card. University of Minnesota Press, 2006.
