= The Rage of the Vulture =

1948 novel by Alan Moorehead

- First edition (UK)
- Author: Alan Moorehead
- Cover artist: Bip Pares
- Language: English
- Genre: Thriller
- Publisher: Hamish Hamilton (UK); Scribners (US)
- Publication date: 1948
- Publication place: United Kingdom
- Media type: Print
- Pages: 253pp

The Rage of the Vulture is a 1948 novel by the Australian-British writer Alan Moorehead.

== Synopsis ==
The novel is set in the fictional princely state of Kandahar, modeled on Kashmir, at the time of the Partition of India in 1947. While the debate about whether the state will join either India or Pakistan after partition is still on-going, hill tribes begin a campaign of plunder and rapine.

As a war correspondent, Moorehead had himself been present at the time the events depicted.

== Critical reception ==
A reviewer in the News (Adelaide) noted: "The end of an era is portrayed in Moorehead's description of the plight of the uprooted British, whose long-established world of privilege has suddenly collapsed...Weaknesses in the novel lie in some of the characterizations, and particularly in the minor but central story of the redemption of the neurotic hero. But Rage of the Vulture is well worth your reading time."

In The Sydney Morning Herald a critic commented: "Moorehead is a very fine reporter indeed. There are almost unbearably tense passages in The Rage of the Vulture, which lift war's horror and terror right into the environment of the reader. While its romantic interest may loiter and sail serenely into tributaries, rebellion and murder rush the main stream of the story headlong into tautness and fear...The Rage of the Vulture is the kind of book one picks up and reads straight through to its end. Alan Moorehead is just as good when he puts himself at the services of fiction as he was when he wrote of the battlefields of Europe and Africa."

== Film adaptation ==
The novel was adapted by the Hollywood studio Paramount Pictures into the 1951 film Thunder in the East directed by Charles Vidor and starring Alan Ladd, Deborah Kerr, Charles Boyer and Corinne Calvet.

== Bibliography ==
- Goble, Alan. The Complete Index to Literary Sources in Film. Walter de Gruyter, 1999.
- McCamish, Thornton. Our Man Elsewhere: In Search of Alan Moorehead. Black Inc., 2017.
