= Muss 'Em Up =

1936 film directed by Charles Vidor

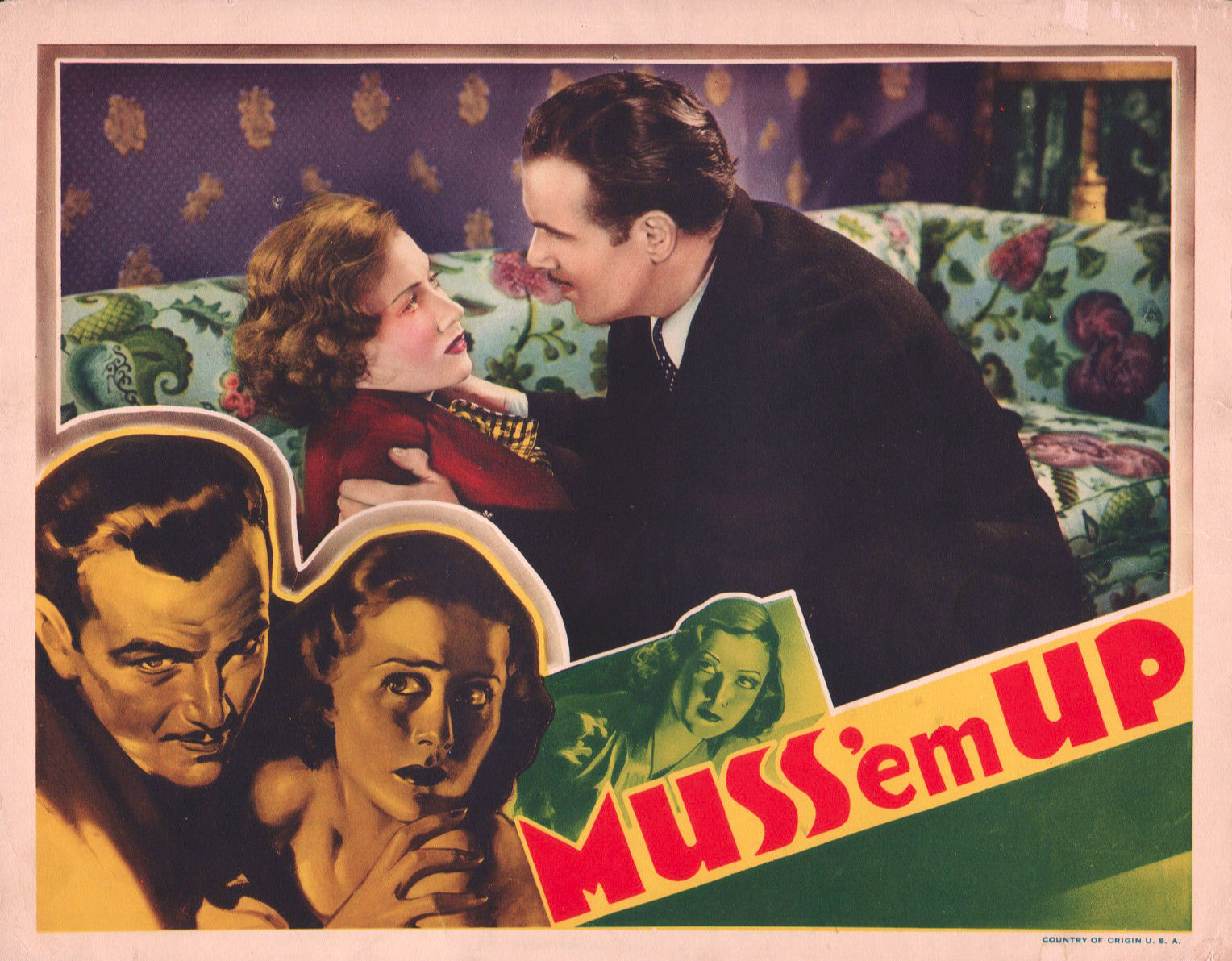
- Lobby card
- Directed by: Charles Vidor; Doran Cox (assistant)
- Written by: Erwin Gelsey
- Produced by: Pandro S. Berman
- Starring: Preston Foster; Margaret Callahan; Alan Mowbray; Ralph Morgan
- Cinematography: J. Roy Hunt; Joseph August
- Edited by: Jack Hively
- Music by: Roy Webb
- Production company: RKO Radio Pictures
- Distributed by: RKO Radio Pictures
- Release dates: February 1, 1936 (Premiere-New York City); February 14, 1936 (US)
- Running time: 70 minutes
- Country: United States
- Language: English

Muss 'Em Up is a 1936 American mystery detective film directed by Charles Vidor from a screenplay by Erwin Gelsey. RKO Radio pictures premiered the film in New York City on February 1, 1936, with a nationwide opening on February 14. The film stars Preston Foster and Margaret Callahan, with a supporting cast which includes Alan Mowbray, Ralph Morgan, Big Boy Williams, and Maxie Rosenbloom.

== Plot ==
Private detective and former police officer “Tip O’Neill” is hired by a wealthy aristocrat to solve the shooting of his dog. The intrigue continues, with kidnapping, police abuse, assault, and ransom as more characters are murdered, and betrayal within his own household leads to an unexpected conclusion.

== Cast ==
- Preston Foster as Tippecanoe 'Tip'O'Neil
- Margaret Callahan as Amy Hutchins, Paul's secretary
- Alan Mowbray as Paul Harding
- Ralph Morgan as Jim Glenray, Paul's brother-in-law
- Guinn 'Big Boy' Williams as 'Red' Cable
- Maxie Rosenbloom as Snake, Spivali's henchman
- Molly Lamont as Nancy Harding
- John Carroll as Gene Leland, Corinne's fiancée
- Florine McKinney as Corinne, Paul's ward
- Robert Middlemass as Inspector Brock
- Noel Madison as Tony Spivali, Gambler
- Harold Huber as Maratti
- Clarence Muse as William, Paul's chauffeur
- Paul Porcasi as Luigi Turseniani, mob boss
- Ward Bond as a gangster
- John Adair as a gangster
- Willie Best as a janitor (uncredited)
