= New York Town =

1941 film by Charles Vidor

- Directed by: Charles Vidor
- Written by: Jo Swerling; Lewis Meltzer; Preston Sturges (uncredited)
- Produced by: Anthony Veiller
- Starring: Fred MacMurray; Mary Martin; Akim Tamiroff; Robert Preston
- Cinematography: Charles Schoenbaum
- Edited by: Doane Harrison
- Music by: Leo Shuken
- Production company: Paramount Pictures
- Distributed by: Paramount Pictures
- Release date: October 31, 1941
- Running time: 94 minutes
- Country: United States
- Language: English

New York Town is a 1941 American romantic comedy film directed by Charles Vidor and starring Fred MacMurray, Mary Martin, Akim Tamiroff and Robert Preston. It was produced and distributed by Paramount Pictures. The film was written by Lewis Meltzer and an uncredited Preston Sturges based on a story by Jo Swerling.

The film is notable for a long opening "single take" shot which establishes the personalities of several New York City apartment residents.

== Plot ==
Victor Ballard is a poor but happy-go-lucky New York sidewalk photographer who shares a studio apartment with a painter from Poland, Stefan Janowski. When Victor shoots a photo of Alexandra Curtis, he realizes she is desperate and in need of a friend who can guide her through the ways and means of surviving in Manhattan with no money. Alexandra moves in as a third roommate and helps out with Victor's street photography. Victor attempts to help her by getting her hooked up with a rich Park Avenue swell, but Alexandra accidentally meets his handsome son, Paul Bryson Jr. instead, and Victor, to his own surprise, becomes jealous. Before Victor and Alexandra come together as a couple, there are (of course) further misunderstandings and fisticuffs and the like.

== Cast ==
- Fred MacMurray as Victor Ballard
- Mary Martin as Alexandra Curtis
- Akim Tamiroff as Stefan Janowski
- Robert Preston as Paul Bryson Jr.
- Lynne Overman as Sam
- Eric Blore as Vivian
- Fuzzy Knight as Gus Nelson
- Cecil Kellaway as Shipboard Host
- Edward McNamara as Brody
- Oliver Blake as Bender, the lawyer
- Ken Carpenter as Master of Ceremonies
- Sam McDaniel as Henry
- Iris Adrian as Toots O'Day
- Monte Blue as McAuliffe
- Laura Hope Crews as Apple Annie
- Chester Clute as Mr. Cobbler
- Margaret Hayes as Lola Martin
- Grace Hayle as Mrs. Bixby
- Regis Toomey as Jim Martin
- Milton Kibbee as Postman
- James Flavin as Recruiting Sergeant

== Production ==
New York Town, based on the story, "Night Time" by Jo Swerling, was originally to have been directed by Mitchell Leisen, but when he was assigned to do I Wanted Wings, Charles Vidor was borrowed from Columbia.

The film was in production from early November to late December 1940. The original ending of the film featured a parade of the German-American Bund, but this was re-shot. The film was released on 31 October 1941, a full 10 months after the completion of principal photography.

== Bibliography ==
- Davis, Ronald L. Mary Martin, Broadway Legend. University of Oklahoma Press, 2014.
