= Alan Moorehead =

Australian journalist and war correspondent

Alan Moorehead AO, OBE
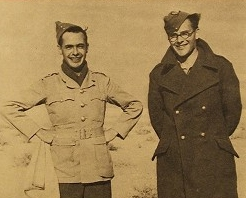
- Moorehead (left) with Alexander Clifford during the North African Campaign
- Born: Alan McCrae Moorehead; 22 July 1910; Melbourne, Victoria, Australia
- Died: 29 September 1983 (aged 73); London, England, United Kingdom
- Resting place: Hampstead Cemetery
- Education: Scotch College, Melbourne
- Alma mater: University of Melbourne
- Spouse: Lucy Milner (m. 1940)
- Children: Caroline Moorehead

Alan McCrae Moorehead, AO, OBE (22 July 1910 – 29 September 1983) was an Australian war correspondent and author of popular histories, most notably two books on the nineteenth-century exploration of the Nile, The White Nile (1960) and The Blue Nile (1962).

== Biography ==
Moorehead was born in Melbourne, Australia. He was educated at Scotch College, with a Bachelor of Arts from the University of Melbourne. He travelled to England in 1937 and became a renowned foreign correspondent for the London Daily Express. Writer, world traveller, biographer, essayist, journalist, Moorehead was one of the most successful writers in English of his day. He married Lucy Milner, who at the Daily Express in 1937 "presided over a women's page free of the patronising sentimentality which marked much writing for women at the time".

During World War II he won an international reputation for his coverage of campaigns in the Middle East and Asia, the Mediterranean and Northwest Europe.

He was twice mentioned in despatches and was appointed an Officer of the Order of the British Empire. According to the critic Clive James, "Moorehead was there for the battles and the conferences through North Africa, Italy and Normandy all the way to the end. The hefty but unputdownable African Trilogy, still in print today, is perhaps the best example of Moorehead's characteristic virtue as a war correspondent: he could widen the local story to include its global implications." And James further affirmed, "His copy was world-famous at the time and has stayed good; he was a far better reporter on combat than his friend Ernest Hemingway." Moorehead's 1946 biography of Montgomery also remains well considered – "Moorehead was well able to see – as Wilmot calamitously didn't – that Eisenhower was Montgomery's superior in character and judgment."

In 1956, his book Gallipoli about the Allies' disastrous First World War campaign at Gallipoli, received almost unprecedented critical acclaim (though it was later criticised by the British Gallipoli historian Robert Rhodes James as "deeply flawed and grievously over-praised"). In England, the book won the Sunday Times thousand-pound award and gold medal was the first recipient of the Duff Cooper Memorial Award. The presentation of the latter was made by Sir Winston Churchill on 28 November 1956.

While on a trip to Australia in 1965, Moorehead began to collaborate with producer Robert Raymond. Raymond said in 1966 that he "first got the idea for the documentary when Alan Moorehead was out here last year on a visit. He was working on the establishment of the Australian Wildlife Foundation, and while I was talking to him one day I suddenly said, 'Why don't we do a program?'" This became a two part documentary, 'We, the Destroyers,' broadcast on the commercial channel station TCN-9 in August, 1966. It was an investigation of the damage being done to Australia's flora and fauna. This was a time of higher ecological awareness in Australia, which was accompanied by the launch of the Australian Conservation Foundation in 1965.

In 1966, Moorehead and his wife, younger son and daughter (Caroline Moorehead) made what became for him the first of an annual series of visits to Australia. There he had completed a television script for his manuscript "Darwin and the Beagle", but tragedy struck before the book was published. That December, suffering from headaches, he went into London's Westminster Hospital for an angiogram which precipitated a major stroke.

Through his wife, Lucy, however, his writing voice went on. Darwin and the Beagle was brought out as an illustrated book in 1969. In 1972, she gathered together her husband's scattered autobiographical essays and published them as A Late Education. Moorehead died in London in 1983, and is buried at Hampstead Cemetery, Fortune Green.

== Legacy ==
His professional and personal correspondence — diaries, magazine and journal essays, press cuttings, book serialisations, reviews of his works, the background notes, drafts and proofs of his writings, and material relating to his unpublished writings — have been preserved.

During the 1960s, two major American universities pressed Moorehead to deposit his private papers as a core of their collections of contemporary writers. Instead, in 1971, Alan and Lucy Moorehead brought his papers to Australia to present them in person to the National Library.

== Bibliography ==
=== Books ===
- Mediterranean Front (Hamish Hamilton, 1941) & (US: McGraw, 1942); A journal of his experiences during the first year of WW II while General Wavell was in command, mostly in the Western Desert of North Africa.
- A Year of Battle (Hamish Hamilton, 1943) & (US: Harper, 1943) as Don't Blame the Generals; A journal of his experiences, while General Claude Auchinleck was in command, during the second year of WW II, mostly in the Western Desert of North Africa.
- The End in Africa (Hamish Hamilton, 1943) & (US: Harper, 1943); A journal of his experiences, while General Montgomery was in command, during the third year of WW II, mostly in the Western Desert of North Africa.
- African Trilogy (Hamish Hamilton) & (Harper, 1945); A compendium of the above three books, Mediterranean Front, A Year of Battle and The End in Africa. Abridged edition: The Desert War (Hamish Hamilton, 1965), published in America as The March to Tunis:The North African War: 1940–1943 (Harper, 1967).
- Eclipse (Hamish Hamilton, 1946); A journal of his experiences, starting at the northern shore of Sicily, just before the Allies first set foot on the mainland at the southern tip of Italy in September 1943, through the Salerno and Anzio landings, then passing to the Normandy landings, Operation Market Garden, the Rhine crossing, and the final downfall of the Nazi empire (abridged edition, 1967).
- Montgomery: A Biography (Hamish Hamilton, 1946).
- The Rage of the Vulture (Hamish Hamilton, 1948); a novel set in Kashmir in 1947 amid an invasion by Pakistani tribesmen which Moorehead had reported for the 'Observer'. Filmed in 1951 as Thunder in the East.
- The Villa Diana (Hamish Hamilton, 1951); travels through post-war Italy, illustrated by Osbert Lancaster.
- The Traitors: The Double Life of Fuchs, Pontecorvo, and Nunn May (Hamish Hamilton, 1952); revised edition 1963.
- Rum Jungle (Hamish Hamilton, 1953); personal travels through the centre and north of Australia with the history of the regions, including the uranium-rich Rum Jungle.
- A Summer Night (Hamish Hamilton, 1954).
- Winston Churchill in Trial and Triumph (US: Houghton Mifflin, 1955).
- Gallipoli (Hamish Hamilton, 1956); new edition 1967.
- The Russian Revolution (Collins/Hamish Hamilton, 1958).
- No Room in The Ark (Hamish Hamilton, 1959).
- The White Nile (Hamish Hamilton, 1960); revised and illustrated edition, 1971. Abridged illustrated edition as: The Story of the White Nile (Harper & Row, 1967).
- Churchill: A Pictorial Biography (Viking, 1960); Churchill and his World: A Pictorial Biography (Thames & Hudson, 1965; Revised edition).
- The Blue Nile (Hamish Hamilton, 1962); revised and illustrated edition, 1972. Abridged illustrated edition as: The Story of the Blue Nile (Harper & Row, 1966).
- Cooper's Creek (Hamish Hamilton, 1963); about the Burke and Wills expedition across Australia
- The Fatal Impact: An Account of the Invasion of the South Pacific, 1767–1840 (Hamish Hamilton, 1966); revised, illustrated edition, 1987.
- Darwin and the Beagle (Hamish Hamilton, 1969).
- A Late Education: Episodes in a Life (Hamish Hamilton, 1970); autobiography, and his friendship with Alexander Clifford during the Spanish Civil War and World War II.

=== Contributions to The New Yorker ===
Incomplete – to be updated

Title	Department	Volume/Part	Date	Page(s)	Subject(s)
Illustrious Sir: If You Value Your Life ...	A Reporter in Sicily	25/50	4 February 1950	36–47	The Sicilian bandit Salvatore Giuliano.
The Angel in May	Profiles	26/8	24 February 1951	34-65	Angelo Poliziano.

== Further reading and related links ==
- Tom Pocock. Alan Moorehead. London: The Bodley Head, 1990.
- Richard Knott. The Trio. The History Press, 2015.
- Moyal, Ann Mozley. (2005). Alan Moorehead: A Rediscovery. Canberra: National Library of Australia. ISBN 978-0-642-27616-2
- Pollinger Ltd., Estate manager
- McCamish, Thornton. (2016). Our Man Elsewhere: In Search of Alan Moorehead. Carlton: Schwartz Publishing Pty Ltd. ISBN 978-1-863-95827-1
