= The Loves of Carmen (1948 film) =

1948 film by Charles Vidor

- Theatrical release poster
- Directed by: Charles Vidor
- Screenplay by: Helen Deutsch
- Based on: Carmen; 1845 novella by Prosper Mérimée
- Produced by: Charles Vidor; Rita Hayworth
- Starring: Rita Hayworth; Glenn Ford
- Cinematography: William E. Snyder
- Edited by: Charles Nelson
- Music by: Mario Castelnuovo-Tedesco
- Color process: Technicolor
- Production company: The Beckworth Corporation
- Distributed by: Columbia Pictures
- Release dates: August 23, 1948 (United States); September 2, 1948 (New York City); October 7, 1948 (Los Angeles)
- Running time: 97 minutes
- Country: United States
- Language: English
- Budget: $2.5 million
- Box office: $2.5 million (US rentals)

The Loves of Carmen is a 1948 American adventure drama romance film directed by Charles Vidor. The film stars Rita Hayworth as the gypsy Carmen and Glenn Ford as her doomed lover Don José.

The Loves of Carmen was publicized as a dramatic adaptation of the novella Carmen by Prosper Mérimée and is otherwise unrelated to Georges Bizet's opera Carmen. It is a remake of the 1927 film of the same name, which was directed by Raoul Walsh and stars Dolores del Río and Victor McLaglen.

The film reunited the stars, writer and director of Gilda. It was Hayworth's last film for four years.

== Plot ==
In Spain, during the early nineteenth century, Don Jose Lizarabengoa arrives in Seville to begin service as a corporal in the Spanish dragoons.

He meets Carmen, a gypsy, who steals his watch, and becomes obsessed with her. Carmen slashes the face of a peasant woman who insults her. Jose is ordered to arrest Carmen but allows her to escape. For this Jose is demoted and confined to guard duty. Jose's commanding officer, the colonel, also falls in love with Carmen.

A fortune teller warns Carmen she will be killed by a man she really loves. She goes to meet Jose, who is discovered by the colonel. The colonel challenges Jose to a duel during which Carmen trips the officer, causing him to fall on Jose's sword and die.

Jose is wanted for murder. He and Carmen flee to the mountains where Jose discovers Carmen is married to Garcia, the leader of a gang of bandits. Jose and Garcia have a knife fight in which Garcia is killed. Jose marries Carmen and takes over the gang, but the couple keep fighting.

Carmen goes to Cordoba and becomes the lover of the bullfighter Lucas. Pablo, one of the bandits, betrays Jose to the police for a reward. Jose tracks down Carmen, who refuses to return to him. She spits on him, he stabs her, and a policeman shoots Jose, mortally wounding him. Carmen and Jose die in each other's arms.

== Cast ==
- Rita Hayworth as Carmen
  - Anita Ellis as Carmen (singing voice) (uncredited)
- Glenn Ford as Don José
- Ron Randell as Andrés
- Victor Jory as García
- Luther Adler as Dancaire
- Arnold Moss as Colonel
- Joseph Buloff as Remendado
- Margaret Wycherly as Old Crone
- Bernard Nedell as Pablo
- John Baragrey as Lucas, a bullfighter
- Eula Morgan as Woman in crowd (uncredited)

== Production ==
This was the first film chosen and co-produced by Hayworth's production company, the Beckworth Corporation, which gave her approval over her material and a percentage of the film's profits. Beckworth (named after Hayworth's daughter Becky) was owned 50% by Columbia and nearly 50% by Hayworth with the remainder held by her agent Johnny Hyde. Hayworth signed an exclusive contract with Beckworth for $250,000 a year for seven years. She was to star in two films a year, with finance banks and Beckworth and Columbia producing. In October 1947 it was announced her first film would be a version of Carmen.

(Orson Welles had pitched a version of Carmen to Cohn starring Paulette Goddard suggesting they go back to the original novel, saying Prosper Mérimée was the James Cain of his time.)

As co-producer, Hayworth hired her father, the dancer Eduardo Cansino, to help choreograph the traditional Spanish dances. Also, her uncle José Cansino can be seen as her dance partner in one scene, and her brother Vernon Cansino has a bit part as a soldier.

Gar Moore and Gig Young were reportedly among those who tested for the male lead. In November 1947 Columbia announced that Glenn Ford would play the part. Virginia Van Upp did a last minute rewrite of the script. No music from Bizet's opera was used - the musical score consisted of flamenco songs.

Charles Vidor, the director, said "if I made the picture for opera lovers, nobody but opera lovers would come... But if we do the story realistically, using the sort of gypsy music Carmen herself must have danced to, and discard the familiar opera trappings, even opera lovers can enjoy the picture."

Ron Randell, recently signed to Columbia, was billed third. His casting was announced in November.

The movie was estimated to have a budget between two and three million. Shooting started in November and took place at the studio and on location in the Alabama Mountains near Lone Pine.

The musical score of the film was composed by Mario Castelnuovo-Tedesco.

The original theatrical release poster artist and illustrator is Bradshaw Crandell, "The Artist of the Stars."

== Reception ==
The New York Times review focused mostly on Hayworth's performance: “With all due regard to for Rita Hayworth’s abundant and evident charms, bestowed upon her by nature and the make-up department equally, it must be surmised that she simply hasn’t got what it takes to play the role of Carmen, Prosper Merimée’s classic gypsy vamp. For an emptier lot of posturing and posing, of slinging hips and general emoting of passion you’re never likely to see that that indulged by Miss Hayworth....the slattern conceived by Merimée is a lacquered and lifeless creature in this stagey and stolid charade. Even a couple of dances and one song are pretty dull. And the Don Jose of the novel, who was a contemptible stuffed-shirt, is here a mopish fall-guy in the performance of Glenn Ford.”

== Lawsuit ==
In 1954, Hayworth sued Columbia for a financial accounting over this and three other movies she made through Beckworth, Affair in Trinidad, Miss Sadie Thompson, and Salome.

== See also ==
- List of American films of 1948
