= Charles Vidor =

Hungarian-American director (1899-1959)

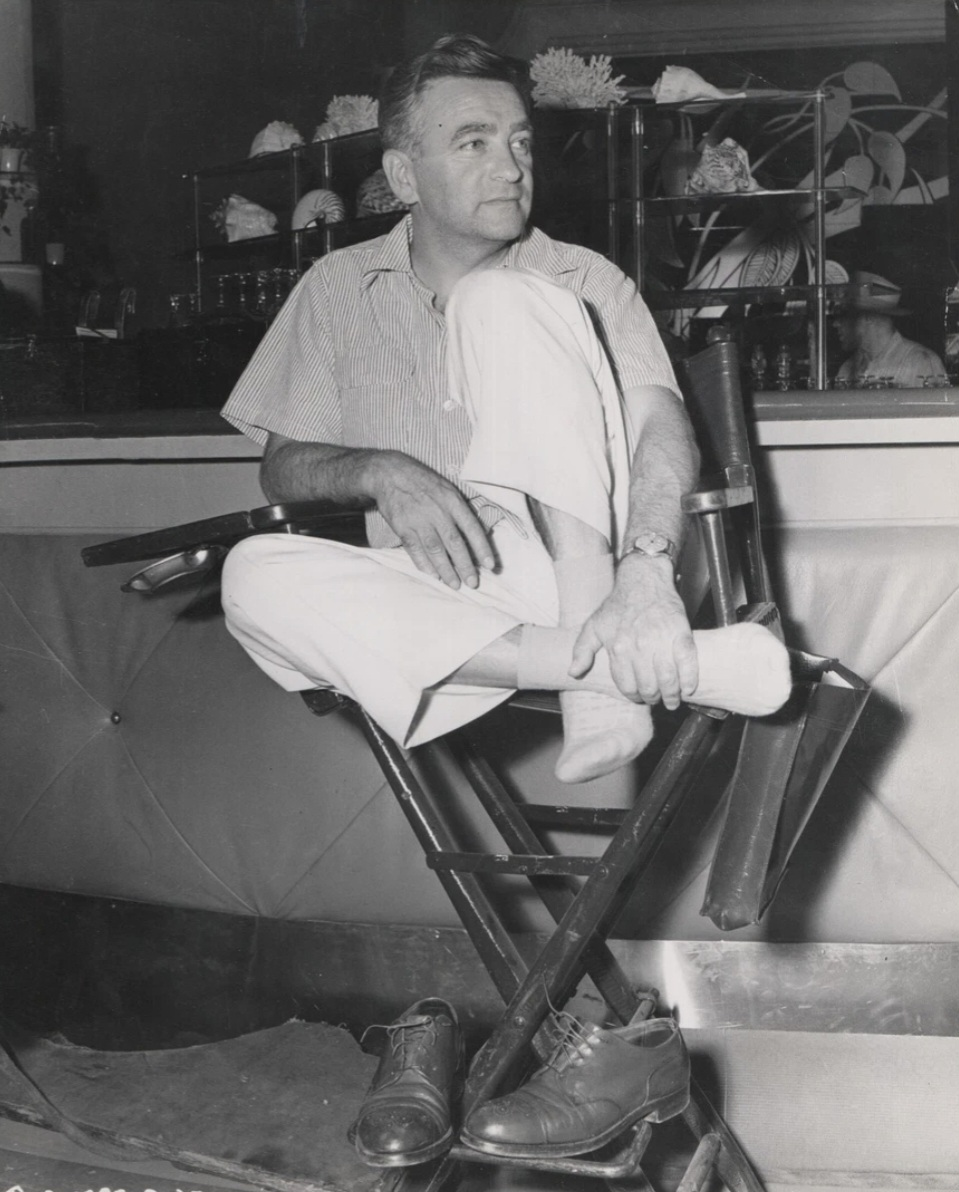
- Vidor in 1946
- Born: Károly Vidor; 27 July 1899; Budapest, Austria-Hungary (now Hungary)
- Died: 4 June 1959 (aged 59); Vienna, Austria
- Resting place: Home of Peace Memorial Park
- Occupation: Director
- Years active: 1929–1959
- Spouses: Frances Varone (m. 1924; div. 1932) Karen Morley (m. 1932; div. 1943) Evelyn Keyes (m. 1944; div. 1945) Doris Warner (m. 1945)
- Children: 3

Charles Vidor (born Károly Vidor; July 27, 1899 – June 4, 1959) was a Hungarian-American director. Among his film successes are The Bridge (1929), Double Door (1934), The Tuttles of Tahiti (1942), The Desperadoes (1943), Cover Girl (1944), Together Again (1944), A Song to Remember (1945), Over 21 (1945), Gilda (1946), The Loves of Carmen (1948), Rhapsody (1954), Love Me or Leave Me (1955), The Swan (1956), The Joker Is Wild (1957), and A Farewell to Arms (1957).

== Life and career ==
Born Károly Vidor in Budapest, Hungary, he served in the Austro-Hungarian Army during World War I. He first came to prominence during the final years of the silent film era, working with Alex Korda among others. Contrary to common belief, he was not related to fellow director King Vidor (1894–1982).

=== Early Hollywood career ===
In 1922, Vidor emigrated to the United States. He worked as a basso for the English Grand Opera Company. He was a chorus boy in Love Song and worked on Hudson Bay as a longshoreman.

Vidor went to Hollywood where he worked as Korda's assistant. He attracted acclaim for a low budget short he made in his spare time with his own money, The Bridge (1929). This led to a contract at Universal Pictures to work in the editorial department.

He did some uncredited directing on MGM's The Mask of Fu Manchu (1932). His first credited feature as director was Sensation Hunters (1933) for Monogram Pictures. Vidor followed it with Double Door (1934) at Paramount.

=== RKO ===
Vidor accepted a contract to work at RKO Pictures. While there he directed Strangers All (1935), His Family Tree (1935), The Arizonian (1935), and Muss 'Em Up (1936).

=== Paramount ===
Vidor went back to Paramount where he directed A Doctor's Diary (1937), The Great Gambini (1937), and She's No Lady (1937).

=== Columbia Pictures ===
Vidor signed with Columbia Pictures where he directed Romance of the Redwoods (1939), Blind Alley (1939) and Those High Grey Walls (1939). These were lower budgeted productions but they were well received. "I enjoyed those little pictures", he said later.

Frank Capra got Vidor in to do some second unit work on Mr Smith Goes to Washington (1939), which was running behind schedule. Vidor directed the scenes in Smith's home town. "I had more money to spend than I was ever given to make a feature picture", he later said.

Vidor was loaned out to Edward Small to direct My Son, My Son! (1940). Back at Columbia, he began to be assigned to more prestigious films like The Lady in Question (1940). He took over from James Whale on They Dare Not Love (1941) and did Ladies in Retirement (1941).

Vidor was loaned to Paramount to direct New York Town (1941) and RKO for The Tuttles of Tahiti (1942).

Back at Columbia, Vidor directed the studio's first Technicolor movie, The Desperadoes (1943). He followed it with the Rita Hayworth–Gene Kelly musical, Cover Girl (1944) which was a huge success. On June 11, 1944 Vidor signed a seven-year contract with Columbia.

Vidor did Together Again (1944) then made a biopic of Chopin, A Song to Remember (1945), which was another big hit, and made a star of Cornel Wilde.

After Over 21 (1946) with Irene Dunne, Vidor directed another classic film with Gilda (1946) starring Hayworth and Glenn Ford.

=== Clashes with Harry Cohn ===
Vidor was Columbia's leading director but he was fighting with head of production Harry Cohn – for instance, Cohn wanted Vidor to direct Johnny O'Clock but Vidor refused.

He started directing The Guilt of Janet Ames (1947), but fought with Cohn and was replaced during filming by Henry Levin.

In 1946 Vidor sued Columbia, seeking to be released from his contract and $78,000 in damages. The case went to trial, where Vidor argued that he had been treated badly by Cohn, who swore at him. (Cohn admitted the swearing but said this was his way of expressing himself.) He also said Cohn would not loan him $25,000 to buy a new house and that Cohn made him cry twice by yelling at him. The judge ruled against Vidor, ordering him back to work. Vidor began directing Ford and William Holden in The Man from Colorado (1949) but clashed with Cohn once more over the shooting schedule and was fired during filming for being too slow, being replaced by Levin.

The matter settled and Vidor was reunited with Hayworth and Ford for the expensive The Loves of Carmen (1948). Columbia exercised their option under Vidor's contract.

In 1948 Vidor announced he had purchased rights to Sirocco, a French Foreign Legion tale based on the novel Coup de Grace he wanted to make with Rita Hayworth and Humphrey Bogart. He was also preparing to do the film version of Born Yesterday and did a few days uncredited work on Under Cover Man.

In August 1949 Vidor was assigned the musical The Petty Girl (1950). He refused to do it, Columbia put him on suspension, and Vidor told Columbia that he considered his contract with them at an end. (He was replaced on The Petty Girl by Levin). In September Columbia sued Vidor to stop him walking out on the contract.

In October 1949 Vidor bought himself out of his contract for $75,000 at $15,000 a year for five years. Louis B. Mayer had acted as intermediary "for the good of the industry". Vidor's career had two years to run, at $3,000 a week then $3,500 a week.

=== MGM ===
In December 1949 Vidor signed a contract with MGM to direct The Running of the Tide which was never made.

Vidor was one of several directors on MGM's It's a Big Country (1951).

Vidor went to Paramount with a project he had developed himself, Thunder in the East (filmed 1951, released 1952), which starred Alan Ladd.

Sam Goldwyn used him on Hans Christian Andersen (1952) which was a huge success. After filming Vidor optioned the novel SPQR and announced he would film it independently but it was not made.

At MGM Vidor did a musical with Elizabeth Taylor, Rhapsody (1954) and a biopic of Ruth Etting, Love Me or Leave Me (1955), a big success. Vidor directed Grace Kelly's last movie, The Swan (1956).

In 1956 he announced he had formed his own company, Aurora, to make The Life of Nijinsky.

=== Final years ===
Vidor went into partnership with Frank Sinatra and Joe E. Lewis to make a biopic of the latter, The Joker Is Wild (1957). Sinatra and Vidor were going to reunite on Kings Go Forth but then David O. Selznick hired Vidor to make the troubled A Farewell to Arms (1957), replacing John Huston.

Vidor's last film was an attempt to repeat the success of A Song to Remember, another biopic of a composer, in this case Liszt: Song Without End (1960) (originally titled A Magic Flame). He died of a heart attack three weeks into filming.

== Personal life ==
He was married four times:

- Frances Varone 1924–1931
- the actress Karen Morley 1932–1943 (separated 1940)
- the actress Evelyn Keyes 1944–1945
- Doris Warner, daughter of Warner Bros. President Harry Warner, 1945–1959 (until his death)

He had three sons – Quentin, Brian and Michael.

== Death ==
Charles Vidor died at the age of 59 in Vienna, Austria, from a heart attack, reportedly in flagrante delicto with a bit player from the film he was directing at the time. He was in the midst of making Song Without End, and was replaced as director by George Cukor. He was entombed at Home of Peace Cemetery in the same mausoleum as Harry Warner.

== Recognition ==
Vidor has a star on the Hollywood Walk of Fame at 6676 Hollywood Boulevard for his contribution to motion pictures.

== Filmography ==
- The Bridge (1929 short)
- The Mask of Fu Manchu (1932) (uncredited)
- Sensation Hunters (1933)
- Double Door (1934)
- Strangers All (1935)
- The Arizonian (1935)
- His Family Tree (1935)
- Muss 'em Up (1936)
- Sinister House (1936)
- A Doctor's Diary (1937)
- The Great Gambini (1937)
- She's No Lady (1937)
- Romance of the Redwoods (1939)
- Blind Alley (1939)
- Those High Grey Walls (1939)
- My Son, My Son! (1940)
- The Lady in Question (1940)
- They Dare Not Love (1941) (uncredited co-director)
- Ladies in Retirement (1941)
- New York Town (1941)
- The Tuttles of Tahiti (1942)
- The Desperadoes (1943)
- Cover Girl (1944)
- Together Again (1944)
- A Song to Remember (1945)
- Over 21 (1945)
- Gilda (1946)
- The Loves of Carmen (1948)
- The Man from Colorado (1949)
- It's a Big Country (1951)
- Hans Christian Andersen (1952)
- Thunder in the East (1952)
- Rhapsody (1954)
- Love Me or Leave Me (1955)
- The Swan (1956)
- The Joker Is Wild (1957)
- A Farewell to Arms (1957)
- Song Without End (1960)
