= Washington Square Players =

Theatre group

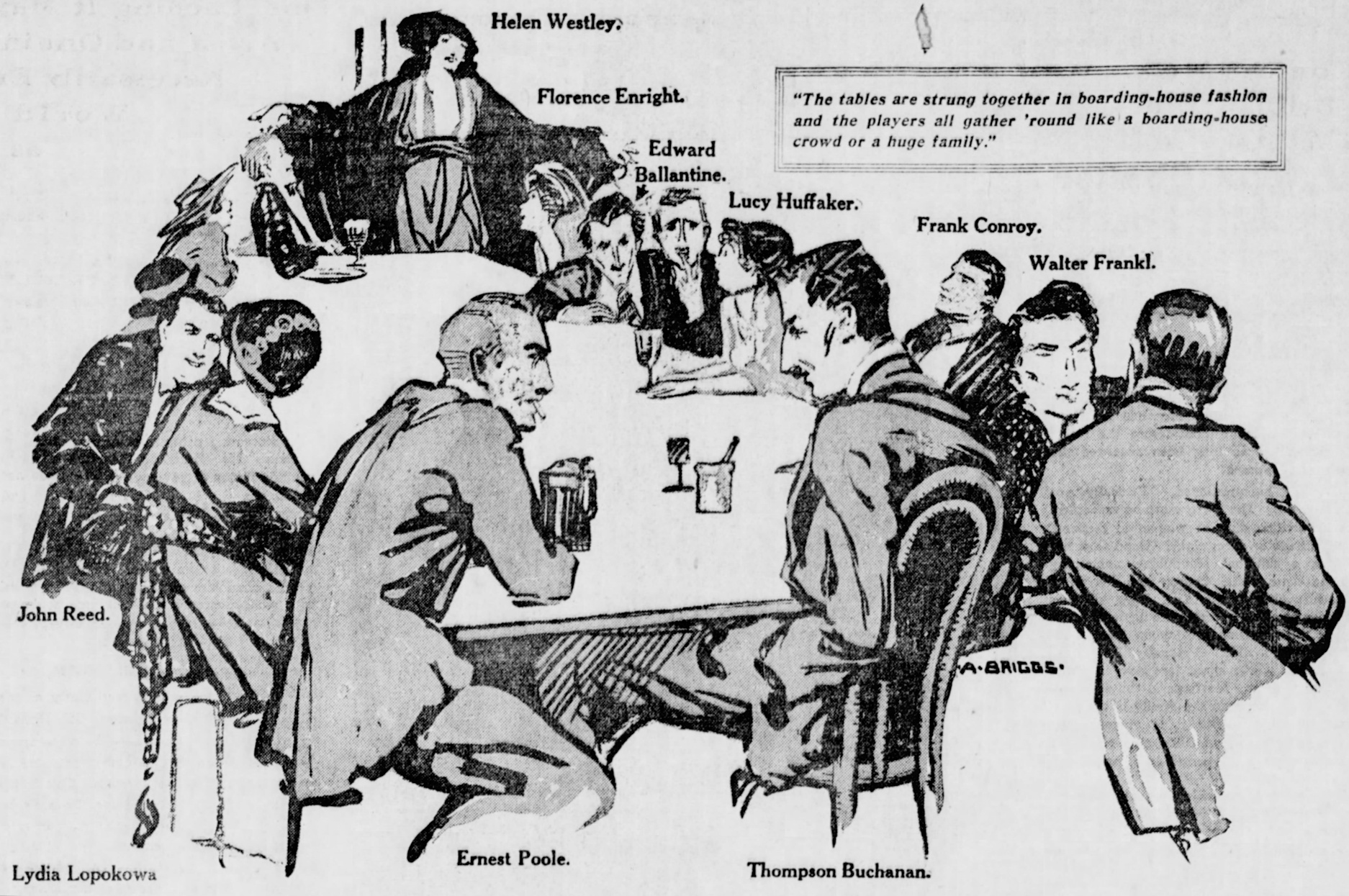
- Some Washington Square Players from Dec 1915
- Formation: Feb 19, 1915
- Dissolved: May 18, 1918
- Type: Theatre group
- Location: Manhattan, New York City
- Artistic director(s): Robert Edwards; Michio Itō; Robert E. Jones; Rollo Peters; Lee Simonson
- Notable members: Frank Conroy; Katharine Cornell; Samuel A. Eliot Jr; Edward Goodman; Arthur Hohl; Glenn Hunter; Sam Jaffe; Lawrence Langner; Robert Lawson; Lydia Lopokova; Charles Meredith; Philip Moeller; Mary Morris; Ida Rauh; Ralph Roeder; José Ruben; Helen Westley; Roland Young

The Washington Square Players (WSP) was a theatre troupe and production company that existed from 1915 to 1918 in Manhattan, New York City. It started as a semi-amateur Little Theatre then matured into a Repertory theatre with its own touring company and drama school. It received national newspaper coverage and sparked like-minded companies across the country. After it ceased operating, three of its members founded the Theatre Guild.

== Purpose and plan ==
At the Washington Square Bookshop owned by the Boni brothers and the adjacent building housing the Liberal Club, an eclectic group of locals used to gather and criticize the state of American theatre. Sometime in late 1914 or early 1915 this group of creative types decided to join forces and produce their own plays. The company was formally organized in 1915, with playwright Edward Goodman as its director and Lawrence Langner as business manager. The New York Tribune referred to the troupe members as both professionals and semi-professionals. An article on the finances of the WSP from 1917 clarified its nature:

The Washington Square Players are a corporation, but they pay no dividends. That is, their stockholders are stockholders in name only, and there is a general understanding that all profits must be turned back into future productions.

According to a "manifesto" that was given out to the press, (Note: Their "press agent" was Lucy Huffaker, a writer who volunteered her services and was later married to Edward Goodman) the company's goal was to present works of artistic merit, regardless of provenance though giving weight to American dramatists, that might not otherwise be performed in commercial theatres. New works by American playwrights were encouraged to be submitted, and new ideas for staging and setting would be considered.

Their original venue was to be a barn in an alley off Washington Square. Unable to afford anywhere closer to Greenwich Village, the company took a sub-lease on the Bandbox Theatre, which seated less than 300. It stood at East 57th Street just east of Third Avenue in Manhattan. Originally Adolph Phillips' Theater, where German plays were presented, it was renamed by new owners who leased it to the "New York Play Actors" corporation, headed by Douglas J. Wood. They had the same idea as the WSP but charged $2 a seat and could not make it work, so they sublet to the WSP.

The WSP plan was for performances to be given on Fridays and Saturdays only, for four weekends running. After these eight performances finished, a new program would be offered for the next four weeks. All seats were only 50 cents, a considerable discount over commercial theatres of the time. The troupe preferred tickets to be purchased on a subscriber basis rather than at performance time. One reviewer noted that Edna Ferber and Fola La Follette were subscribers. There were no salaried performers among the WSP that first season. All money raised went to the rent of the theatre, lighting, and other production expenses. The membership was described as composed of dramatic, musical, and literary people who lived in the "art colony" around Washington Square.

== First season: Feb 1915-Jun 1915 ==
The debut production was given on February 19, 1915, (Note: The date which thereafter the WSP would celebrate as its "birthday".) consisting of some one-act playlets and a pantomime, three of which had been written for the event. The program was preceded by a little charade between Edward Goodman and two shills in the audience, whose complaints about the tardy curtain raising allowed for exposition on what the WSP were trying to accomplish. Reviewers from major newspapers covered the opening night; all praised the performances and lauded the experiment it represented. One mentioned that the pantomime was performed by "young mimes gathered from the Italian quarter near the square". Another listed all twenty-seven performers by name, though without ascribing playlets or roles for most.

The Bandbox was filled completely for every subsequent performance of that first program. On one weekend, nearly 150 people were turned away from the box office, so that the first bill was extended for another week, with matinees and weekday performances added. For amateur performers, many who had other careers to pursue, this unexpected success was proving very demanding. The news about the debut of the WSP was also spread around the country in the drama columns of newspapers in other states.

The second bill presented by WSP was again a series of one-act playlets and a pantomime. Because of the first bill's extension its opening night was on March 26, 1915. There were three original works by WSP members, a classic by Leonid Andreyev, and a little-known playlet by John Reed. (Note: Reed wasn't a member of the WSP but knew many of them from Greenwich Village. When in New York, he would join them after performances in late suppers at the restaurant next to the Bandbox.) One of the previously announced playlets was not performed opening night due to the illness of its leading actress; its unknown whether it was ever performed.

The third program started on May 7, 1915, with four one-act playlets. Most successful according to reviewers was a Maurice Maeterlinck satire, in which St. Anthony appears at a modern funeral and resurrects the deceased to the dismay of the hopeful heirs. A social drama about self-sacrifice in the tenements by Rose Pastor Stokes was also praised. A previously announced pantomime failed to be presented. Once again extra performances had to be scheduled on weekdays to meet the demand.

The fourth and final bill of the season was presented starting May 25, 1915. It consisted of a one-act farce by Anton Chekov, plus repeats of three popular playlets from earlier bills. This program was for one week only, ending with two performances on May 31, 1915, for the Irish Theater of America was due to mount plays at the Bandbox starting June 1. However, the WSP was invited to perform their fourth program at the Little Theater in Philadelphia. They gave two performances there on June 5, 1915, dropping the Chekov farce of the fourth bill in favor of a Philip Moeller playlet from their second program.

=== Lectures and bookshop ===
During the first season, the WSP sponsored monthly lectures by Clayton Hamilton on Sunday afternoons at the Bandbox Theatre. Only the third and final topic is known: The Little Theater - How Can It Grow Up?.

An interesting feature of the tenancy of the WSP at the Bandbox (and later at the Comedy Theatre) was a small "bookshop" off the main lobby where copies of the plays presented could be purchased.

== Second season: Oct 1915-May 1916 ==
At the end of their first season, the WSP announced they had leased the Bandbox theatre for the coming season. The company would have full control of the theater instead of sub-letting it. They also announced some policy changes: the better seats would now cost $1 in order to provide some compensation for the artistic and production staff (just $20 per week to begin with, regardless of position, which rose considerably in later seasons), and performances would now be every evening plus a Saturday matinee. Boston drama critic Hiram Kelly Moderwell wrote an essay called Art and Buttered Bread which explained why the policy changes were beneficial. There would be a special subscriber list at $2 a performance which would subsidize keeping some seats at 50 cents, with all others going for a dollar.

=== Personnel changes ===
Ida Rauh, a founding member of the WSP, defected to the Provincetown Players after the first bill. (Note: Lawrence Langner, in his memoir Magic Curtain (1951) says she was unhappy with the parts offered to her.) Performer Samuel A. Eliot Jr left for Indianapolis to assume the leadership of the Little Theater Society of Indiana. Joining the company were Beverly Sitgreaves, who set up a small workshop in the Bandbox on dramatics and stagecraft for the WSP only, Grace Griswold as house manager, Lydia Lopokova, Frank Conroy, Glenn Hunter, and Roland Young.

=== Productions ===
The second season opened on October 4, 1915 at the Bandbox Theatre with four one-act plays, only one of which, Helena's Husband, was original and written by an WSP member. The New York Times reviewer thought it the best piece in an uneven bill, but savaged Ralph Roeder for his work in Roberto Bracco's A Night of Snow. Cleveland Rodgers, critic for the Brooklyn Daily Eagle, agreed and noted the program ran overly long with unexplained delays and poor settings. However, Hiram Kelly Moderwell was familiar with the Italian verismo style of Bracco, recognized that Roeder did an excellent job portraying a pretentious and disagreeable character, but acknowledged that American audiences were not yet ready for this sort of drama. Heywood Broun writing for the New York Tribune provided a complete cast list while heaping praise on Lydia Lopokova in The Antick. (Note: Broun was romantically involved with Lopokova at the time) Finally, Aleck Woollcott in his column Second Thoughts on First Nights pronounced three of the playlets a success and expressed hope that the WSP would stick to one-act plays. Two weeks into the first bill, A Night of Snow was replaced by a popular first season revival, Interior.

For their second bill of the season the WSP presented four one-act comedies starting on November 8, 1915. Two of them, Whims by Alfred de Musset and The Honorable Lover by Roberto Bracco, were original translations from French and Italian by Ralph Roeder. Literature by Arthur Schnitzler and Overtones, written in 1913 by American Alice Gerstenberg, completed the quartet. The new program was presented Monday thru Thursday evenings, while the first bill of the season continued running on Friday and Saturday evenings and Saturday matinee for a few weeks. Heywood Broun found the comedies imaginative but felt they merged one into another, though he ranked Overtones as best. Aleck Woollcott felt Overtones was a clever idea whose execution could have been better; he ranked it and Literature as the two best performances. He also deflected protest at so much attention being given to the WSP by proclaiming "theirs is the only experimental theatre in New York".

The third program for this season didn't appear until January 10, 1916. It consisted of three one-act plays and a pantomime in five scenes. Lydia Lopokova left the WSP before the third bill's premiere to resume dancing. The whimsical playlet The Roadhouse of Arden by Philip Moeller and the pantomime The Red Cloak by Josephine A. Meyer and Lawrence Langner were both original works, and proved the most successful for this bill. A dissenting view came from Heywood Broun, who thought Andre Tridon's translation of The Tenor by Frank Wedekind the best work, but noted the audience responded most to The Clod by Lewis Beach. Nearly all reviewers praised the sets by Lee Simonson and Robert Lawson.

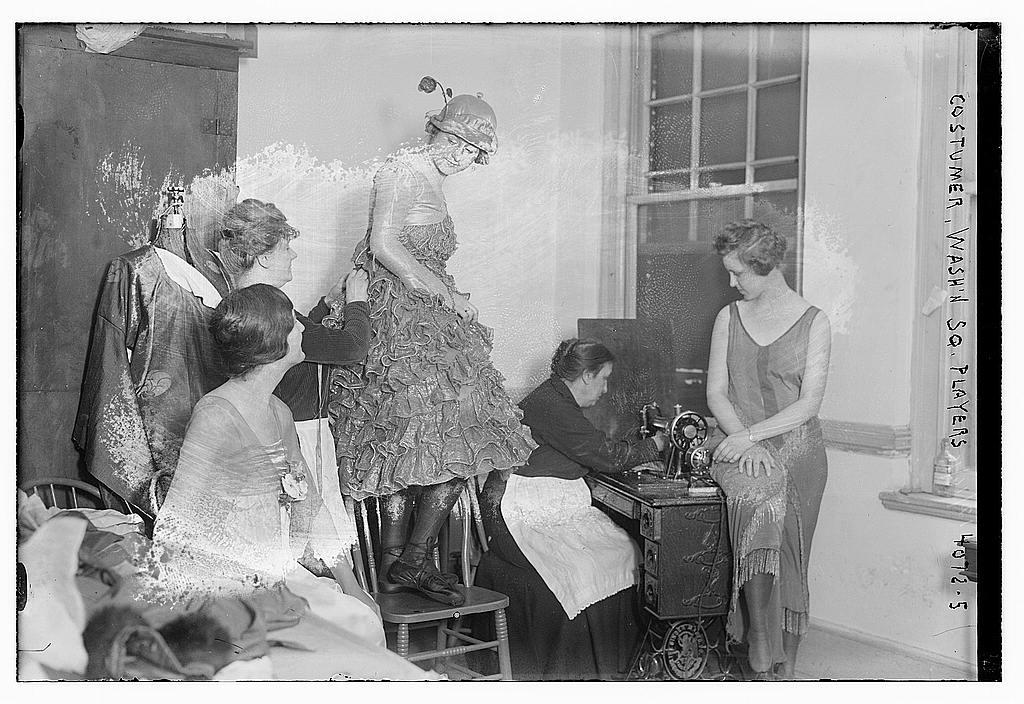
Players in 1916

The fourth program of the second season didn't start until March 20, 1916 but then ran for two months. It consisted of three American playlets and a 15th Century French farce. It also featured a new actress, Mary Morris, who graduated from apprentice to leading lady with this bill. The general consensus among reviewers was that this program was the strongest yet presented in terms of material, acting, and sets, and would have wide appeal. A plaintive note was sounded by Heywood Broun, when he questioned whether Children by Guy Bolton and Tom Carlton, or The Age of Reason by Cecil Dorrian (whom he referred to erroneously as "Mr. Dorrian") really belonged at the Bandbox as any more commercial theater would have been happy to stage them. Children according to critic Cleveland Rodgers, was "unmotivated melodrama, where you see people getting into the way of Fate's locomotive in order that they may be run over for your entertainment". Another reviewer was impressed with the urban tragedy of The Magical City by Zoe Akins, but thought the rhythm of the free verse meter in which it was written could hardly be detected. Pierre Patelin, an anonymous medieval work translated and adapted by Maurice Relonde, was judged an excellent presentation for its historicity as well for the sets by Lee Simonson.

During April 1916 the WSP announced they had leased the larger Comedy Theatre for their next season, and would start giving longer plays. Their fifth and final bill for the second season began May 22, 1916, but only ran nine days, as the lease on the Bandbox Theatre expired June 1st. For the first time they performed a full length play, Chekhov's The Sea Gull. The Brooklyn Daily Eagle praised the production, particularly the acting of the leads, Roland Young (Constantine Treplieff) and Helen Westley (Irina Arkadina), but also mentioned Mary Morris, Ralph Roeder, and Florence Enright favorably.

=== Lectures ===
The WSP again sponsored occasional lectures at the Bandbox on Sunday afternoons. First up was Walter Prichard Eaton who spoke on The American Theatre: How the Land Lies. Second was Beverly Sitgreaves, who talked about Comparative Standards of Acting Here and Abroad. Third was Stuart Walker, who spoke about the Portmanteau Theatre repertory company he founded. Fourth came Josephine Clement from the Bijou in Boston to give A Theatre Workshop. Lastly, Mrs. Robert Seymour spoke about Synge and His Islands.

== Summer season 1916 ==
Upon taking possession of the Comedy Theatre, the WSP presented an encore selection of its most popular one-act playlets, starting June 5, 1916. Playing at a real Broadway theatre for the first time (Note: In those years the term "Broadway" referred solely to location rather than seating capacity. Nowadays the Bandbox would be considered Off-Broadway.) before a full house that included Diamond Jim Brady, the Washington Square Players proved their productions could please an audience more than twice the size of the Bandbox. The bill consisted of The Honorable Lover, Pierre Patelin, The Clod, and Helena's Husband, with much the same casting as their original performances. (Note: One significant difference was the absence of Josephine A. Meyer, who had to take two years off due to illness. She was replaced by three younger actresses in the different roles she had originated.) Though the audiences were pleased, critic Charles Darnton liked only Mary Morris in The Clod, dismissing the other works as negligible and amateurly acted. The New York Times was more generous, praising the "freshness and vitality" of the bill and conceding the WSP had gained by the move, since they now had an orchestra to play between acts.

The WSP ended the first half of its summer season in June. Three of their best actors, Frank Conroy, Margaret Mower, and Harold Meltzer left the company during the following hiatus. The WSP resumed performances August 30, 1916 with another quartet of one-act plays from their past productions. These were Literature, The Miracle of St. Anthony, Eugenically Speaking, and The Bear. (Note: Holland Hudson and Dudley Tucker, who had succeeded Lawrence Langner as business managers for the WSP, told the New York Times in July 1916 that they were having trouble finding new one-act plays worth mounting.) The Brooklyn Daily News considered Literature the best offering, with the other three as interesting failures, the Standard Union preferred The Miracle of St. Anthony, while the Times Union thought Eugenically Speaking received the most applause.

== Third season: Oct 1916-May 1917 ==
As was becoming a common occurrence with the WSP, promising actor Roland Young left for another production company. In fact, of the known leads for this season's first bill, only two (Note: Helen Westley and Florence Enright, both with WSP from the start) had previously performed with the WSP. Professional actors now filled most leading roles at the Comedy, which led one reviewer to praise their "professional finish" and "ensemble excellence". An anonymous newspaperman, noting how many little theater companies had sprung up since the WSP started, suggested unused names for those yet to begin.

=== Touring company ===
During October the WSP formed a touring company, to play the existing repertoire of the company in other cities. The company presented two separate bills of playlets, on alternate days. The first bill had The Roadhouse of Arden, Eugenically Speaking, Literature, In April, and Helena's Husband, while the second consisted of A Bear, The Roadhouse of Arden, Interior, and Pierre Patelin. With such a varied program, the touring company had twenty members; a few were previous WSP players such as Ralph Roeder and Marjorie Deen, but most were newcomers.

The touring company opened in Newark at the Broad Street Theatre on October 23, 1916 for a week. It went to Washington DC for a week, then opened in Philadelphia at the Little Theater for a week on November 6, 1916. The company then returned to New York, giving one and two night performances on the way in Wilmington, Delaware, Allentown, Pennsylvania, Trenton, New Jersey, and Scranton.

The tour took a short break, then played the Lyceum Theatre at Ithaca, New York for two nights. The bill was altered slightly to substitute John Reed's Moondown for one of the two Roadhouse performances. Among the many performers listed was a WSP newcomer, Sam Jaffe. It moved on to the Lyceum in Rochester, New York a week later for three performances, where actor Charles Meredith was praised. It opened in Chicago's Playhouse on December 18, 1916 for a seven week engagement. While there, the Drama League enlisted the WSP to take the tour onto cities where it had local groups. The company rode the rails in February 1917, playing one night stands at St. Louis, Indianapolis, Atlanta, Louisville, Buffalo, Cincinnati, and many other cities. It returned to Manhattan in time for some of its members to join the casts of the third season's fourth bill.

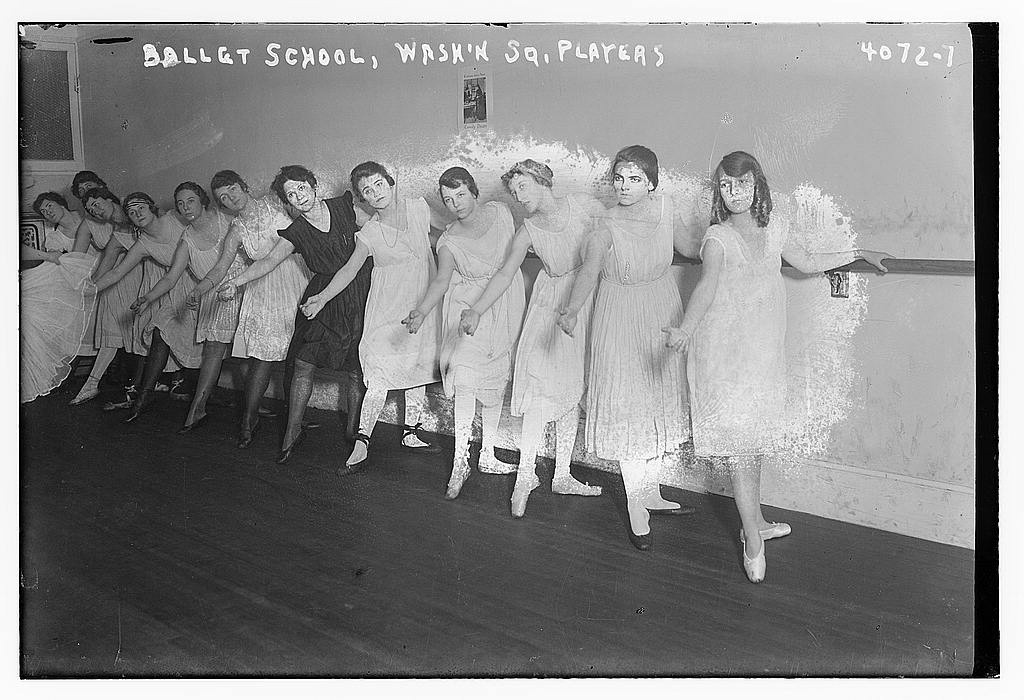
Washington Square Players ballet class

=== Drama school ===
Reviving the short-lived drama workshop idea from the second season, the WSP sponsored Clare Tree Major in setting up the "School for Players" in the building across the street from the Comedy Theatre. The school opened October 2, 1916, drawing upon members of the WSP for general instruction, but also employing expert teachers for fencing, dancing, physical training, diction, and make up. The apprentices put on their first public performance at the Comedy Theatre on the afternoon of December 19, 1916. The bill included four one-act plays and a pantomime.

=== Scenic studio and costume shop ===
Within the same building as the School for Players the WSP, drawing on its artistic membership, set up a soon thriving business in creating stage scenery for other professional productions. This is where Lee Simonson, Robert E. Jones, Rollo Peters and others designed and created sets for both WSP productions and other shows. Raymond Hitchcock's Hitchy-Koo Revue of 1917 had fourteen sets created in this studio. By the end of the third season, both the Scenic studio and the Drama school had shown a profit, helping to cancel out some of the expense of the touring company.

That same six-story building also housed the costume shop for the WSP, where the costumers did their design work and sewing, and the wardrobes of costumes from prior productions. It is not known whether this shop served production companies other than the WSP.

=== Productions ===
The third season for the Washington Square Players opened at the Comedy Theatre on October 2, 1916. The first bill consisted of four one-act plays: A Merry Death by Nikolai Evreinov, translated from the Russian by C.E. Rechofer; Lover's Luck by Georges de Porto-Riche, translated from the French by Ralph Roeder; The Sugar House by Alice Brown; and Sisters of Susanna by Philip Moeller. Mary Coates, playing her first professional part in Sisters of Susanna, received an embarrassing gush of praise. Critic Charles Darnton was cutting about A Merry Death and Sisters of Susanna, but praised Lover's Luck.

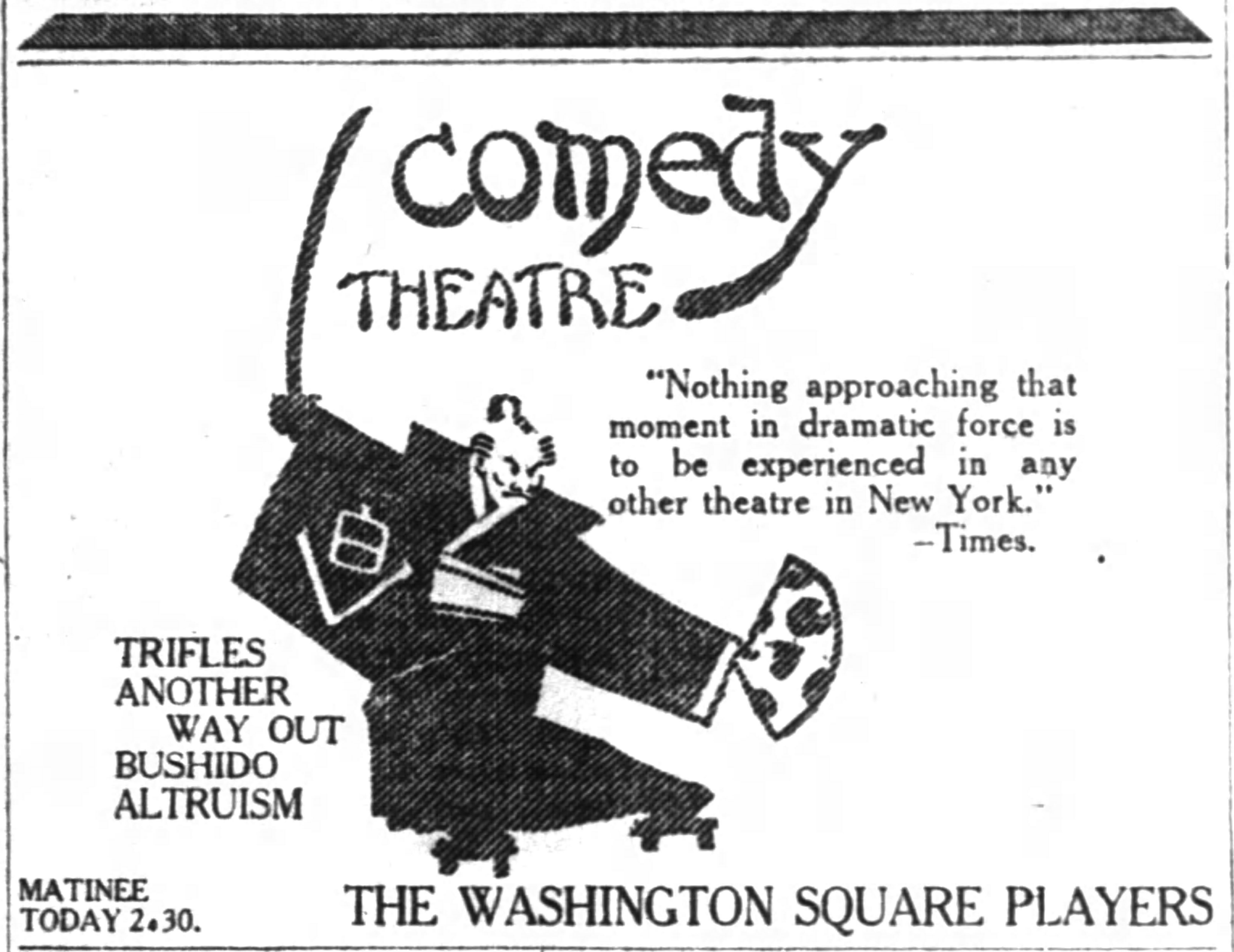
November 1916

The second bill opened on November 13, 1916 at the Comedy. It was again four one-act plays, two of which were recent American works. They were: Bushido by Takeda Isumo, an extract (Note: The complete play takes 12 hours to perform.) from an early 18th Century Japanese play, translated by Wolfgang von Gersdorf and Arthur Hohl, and produced with the aid of Michio Itō; Trifles by Susan Glaspell; Another Way Out by Lawrence Langner; and Altruism by Karl Ettlinger, translated from German by Benjamin F. Glazer. Both The New York Times and the New York Herald thought Bushido the best of the program, with the satire of premarital habitation in Another Way Out second best. The Brooklyn Daily Eagle appreciated the subtle power of the tragic Trifles and rated it first. Heywood Broun was honest enough to admit that like the other critics he left the theatre before Altruism had started, as Bushido ran so long. Broun gave the complete casts for the first three playlets. At the very bottom of the seventeen credited performers for Bushido is listed a newcomer to the WSP, Katharine Cornell. This was likely her first professional stage performance; thanks to newspaper deadlines, whether she also appeared in Altruism is unknown. This bill was the most successful of all WSP productions, a fact celebrated with a gala evening on February 6, 1917 for its 100th performance.

The third program of the season opened February 12, 1917, with four one-act plays. The New York Herald thought all four playlets good, with French actor José Ruben in A Private Account being called "the greatest find the Washington Square Players have made this season". (There was no mention made of the young actress playing the Third Servant in The Death of Tintagiles). The Brooklyn Daily Eagle was less charitable, dismissing The Last Straw and The Hero of Santa Maria as obvious, The Death of Tintagiles as of appeal only to morbid adolescents, while noting A Private Account had already been performed at another theatre that year.

On March 12, 1917 the Comedy Theatre was dedicated to a week-long benefit for the Women's Suffrage Party. Two plays from the third bill were retained, The Hero of Santa Maria and The Death of Tintagiles, while two encore presentations, Trifles and Lover's Luck were added for the fund raising drive.

The fourth bill of the season opened on March 21, 1917, with three plays: Sganarelle by Molière and The Poor Fool by Hermann Bahr were both one-act works, Plots and Playwrights was an original two-act play by Edward Massey. Massey's work, a satire on how commercial theater warps real stories, drew the most attention from the Brooklyn Daily Eagle reviewer, who also thought Philip Moeller's translation of Sganarelle into rhyming couplets was "mostly foolish". The Sun's reviewer said The Poor Fool couldn't be heard clearly and what did come through baffled the audience, and that only Plots and Playwrights was worth viewing. The New York Times agreed with the other newspaper reviewers, and suggested the order of plays on the bill be reversed, which was duly done three weeks later.

For their fifth and final bill of the third season the WSP went with a single full-length play, Ibsen's Ghosts. It opened on May 7, 1917 at the Comedy Theatre for what was supposed to be a one week run but due to demand turned into three weeks. Mary Shaw was brought in to play "Mrs. Alving", a role she had first performed eighteen years prior. Aleck Woollcott had unstinted praise for José Ruben as "Oswald Alving", slightly less for Mary Shaw, and hardly any for the other three players. Heywood Broun concurred about Ruben's acting, but felt T.W. Gibson was far better than Shaw, whose gestures seemed stilted or old-fashioned. Like Woollcott, Broun felt Arthur Hohl didn't seem to know his lines, and Margaret Mower was merely "adequate".

== Summer season 1917 ==
The summer season opened on May 28, 1917 with two works from the WSP repertoire and a revival of Strindberg's one-act Pariah. Another Way Out and Plots and Playwrights completed the bill, with much the same casts as their prior performances at the Comedy, save for José Ruben, who had departed the WSP. The Brooklyn Daily Eagle reviewer liked all three and said the large audience did too. This first bill of the summer closed June 30, 1917 after which the WSP took its annual vacation.

Instead of a program of one-act plays for the second part of the summer, the WSP co-produced a play with Edward L. George, presented at the Comedy Theatre on September 19, 1917. This three-act satire, The Family Exit by Lawrence Langner, featured actors from outside the WSP.

== Fourth season: Oct 1917-June 1918 ==
The WSP had problems mounting another subscription season, delaying the opening several times. Wartime requisitioning of strategic materials raised prices and impacted both the theaters and the newspapers that covered them. Newspaper coverage of the WSP and other theater groups grew sparse as war news crowded them for space. During October 1917 the WSP sublet the Comedy Theatre to another production company, which presented a melodrama, The Barton Mystery, again with outside actors. For this month, the WSP temporarily become what it originally set out to counter, a commercial enterprise mounting a popular low-brow work purely for revenue to keep going.

=== Productions ===
The program of four one-act plays which finally opened on October 31, 1917, had Eugene O'Neill's In the Zone, The Avenue by Fenimore Merrill, Blind Alleys by Grace Latimer Wright, and His Widow's Husband by Jacinto Benavente. All four plays had sets designed by Rollo Peters. The New York Times especially liked the O'Neill play, and its lead actor Frederick Roland, who had parts in two other plays as well. The Evening World critic also liked In the Zone and spent his entire column on it, saying at the end only that the three other works "are plays of no importance". The Brooklyn Citizen and The Sun liked The Avenue, which displayed a fifth avenue dress shop window while the proprietor, shop girls, and customers carried on their cruelties and intrigues, ending with the three "mannequins" in the window coming to life, glad they are not human. Blind Alleys, Katherine Cornell's first leading role, concerned a romantic tragedy between husband and wife and the failure to heed intuition. The Sun felt it was too obscure, but The New York Times praised Cornell's performance. Only reviewer Ralph Block described and liked His Widow's Husband, though he too singled out Cornell and Westley in Blind Alleys.

The second bill of the season opened on December 3, 1917. There were three one-act plays: Neighbors by Zona Gale, The Girl in the Coffin by Theodore Dreiser, and The Critic's Comedy by Samuel Kaplan. Also on the bill was a pantomime, a retelling of a Mayan folk legend called Yum Chapab, by J. Garcia Pimental and Beatrice de Holtoir. The Sun liked Gale's gentle rural tragedy, while The New York Times felt it had tempo issues. Both reviewers liked the Kaplan play, especially for Helen Westley's performance as the disillusioned drama critic. Critics Charles Darnton and Cleveland Rodgers and The Times reviewer all singled out the Dreiser play, with its subtext of death from a botched abortion (Note: Both the play and newspapers reviewing it used the euphemism "an illegal operation") as the best work on the program. During this bill the WSP reduced the price of all tickets by half and announced they would pay the "war tax" (evidently a surcharge on entertainment) themselves.

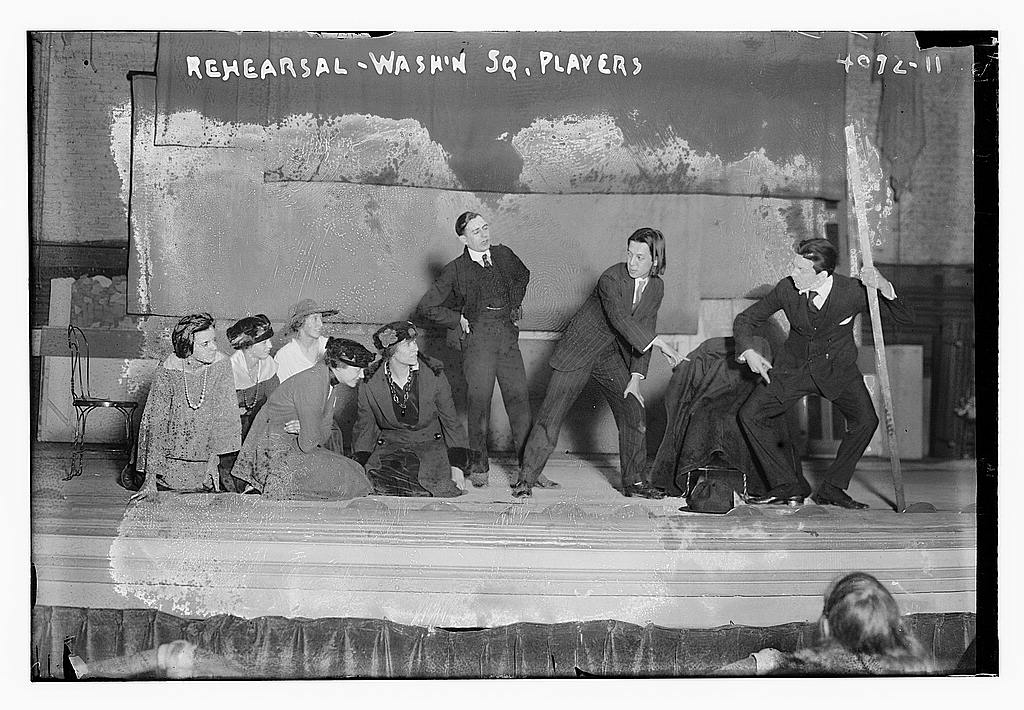
Players in 1918

The third program of the WSP season opened on January 21, 1918, without the services of Katherine Cornell, who had gone to the Bonstelle company in her hometown of Buffalo, New York. As a replacement, the WSP drew on the head of their drama school, Clare Tree Major, to make her first performances in America. Where the previous program had been billed as "All-American" for its authors, the new bill was labelled "All New York". The four playlets were: Suppressed Desires by husband and wife George Cram Cook and Susan Glaspell; Habit by Frank Dare; The Sandbar Queen by George Cronyn; and Pokey by the WSP's own Philip Moeller. The Brooklyn Daily Eagle reviewer thought the bill weaker than usual for having no dramas to leaven the four comedies, but thought Suppressed Desires the best work and Pokey the weakest. The Times Union reviewer thought the bill the best ever presented by the WSP, and Pokey the highpoint.

A three-act play formed the fourth bill for the WSP subscription season. Youth by Miles Malleson had its US debut at the Comedy Theatre on February 20, 1918. Florence Enright had been lent out to the Schubert Organization for Petticoats, so the two female roles were handled by Marjorie Vonnegut and Helen Westley. The main character would be played by newcomer Saxon Kling, with Arthur Hohl, Robert Strange, and Edward Balzerit supporting. The setting is the backstage of a theatre, where amidst the usual chaos of mounting a new play, the young playwright decries marriage and espouses free love with the young actress, who agrees until a complication sets in. The critic for the New York Herald was favorable to the presentation, but thought the playwright must already have outgrown the social ideals argued for in the play. Heywood Broun, while admiring the acting, pointed out the awkward mixed genre of the play, a light-hearted farce in the first act suddenly turns into a serious dialectical in the following two. After the opening week, Suppressed Desires from the third bill was added on to the end of Youth.

The WSP announced its fifth bill of the season as opening March 11, 1918 for a two week run only. This time Shaw's Mrs Warren's Profession would be the only play on the program, with Mary Shaw again as the visiting lead. The play was a revival in New York, though its previous productions there had been brief, as recounted by the Times Union reviewer:

In 1905 the police put an end to what might have been a long run the day after the premiere. Two years later another attempt was made to give the play. This time it is presented as the fifth subscription bill of the Washington Square Players. Policemen were present, but said nothing and did nothing.

The New York Tribune critic was pleased with the acting, particularly that of Mary Shaw and Diantha Pattison, and reminded readers the latter's character ("Vivian Warren") had been termed a "female Bernard Shaw" by William Archer. Every performance was sold out, and the run was repeatedly extended.

An unprecedented sixth program of the WSP season opened on April 22, 1918. This consisted of three one-act plays: Salome by Oscar Wilde, The Home of the Free by Elmer Reizenstein, and Lonesome Like by Harold Brighouse, using many guest actors. Heywood Broun thought the acting in Lonesome Like the best on the bill, but gave a devastating review of Salome and its lead, Madame Yorska, whom he likened to the little sister Jane in Seventeen. The Brooklyn Daily Eagle, equally critical of the supporting acting in Salome, gave some mild praise to Madame Yorska then nuanced her to death. The same reviewer thought the Reizenstein work amusing, liked the fine acting of Lonesome Lake, but questioned whether such an often performed work should be mounted by the WSP. Charles Darnton also praised Lonesome Lake, dismissed The Home of the Free as "cheap and vulgar, without being funny", and was nearly as tough as Broun with the acting of Salome. Broun's savagely funny take on Mme. Yorska provoked a response from the WSP that he obligingly printed in a column. The WSP would have done better to ignore his review; a week later Salome was dropped from the bill and replaced by two new one-act plays.

While Lonesome Like and The Home of the Free continued running, Close the Book by Susan Glaspell and The Rope by Eugene O'Neill were added on May 13, 1918, both from the repertory of the Provincetown Players. Heywood Broun thought both plays were good, but that The Rope had been better acted by the amateurs of the Provincetown Players than the semi-professionals of the WSP.

== Dissolution ==
On May 18, 1918, the Washington Square Players closed the last bill of their last season. Twelve of their members were already in military service, and more were going soon. When the Comedy Theatre was ordered shut, rumors of financial issues circulated. These were denied at first by company officials, who pointed to a planned summer season in San Francisco. However, within a few days Edward Goodman announced that the WSP had made a "voluntary assignment" with its creditors.

An unsigned article in the New York Tribune summed up the failure of their experiment: "The Washington Square Players sold their amateur birthright for the chance of Broadway". However, three of the WSP original founding members, Philip Moeller, Helen Westley, and Lawrence Langner would join with Theresa Helburn to carry forward the experiment with the foundation of the Theatre Guild later in 1918.

== Revival of name ==
The name "Washington Square Players" was revived in the 1920's in association with New York University (NYU) Drama School productions. It was not a formal organization, but a label used by NYU students, the theatre community, and the press.

== Stage performances ==
First season: Feb 1915 - Jun 1915 (Bandbox Theatre), listed by bill, credits incomplete
Bill	Play	Playwright	Director	Notes
1	Licensed	Basil Lawrence (Note: This was a pseudonym for Lawrence Langner, who was afraid his patent clients might not approve of this play's subject)	Edward Goodman	Original social comedy has a pregnant bride, her mother, a newly deceased groom on the couch, and a tardy minister. Cast:Ida Rauh (Bride), Josephine A. Meyer (Mother), (Note: She and Philip Moeller were cousins) Otto Liveright (Deceased Groom) (Note: Tasked to just lie still under a white sheet on the couch, he was caught sitting upright when the curtain opened on the second night of performance. He flopped down and covered himself with the sheet while the audience laughed. Ida Ruah balked at this and refused to go on while Edward Goodman argued and pleaded with her in the wings. After twenty minutes she finally relented, but left the troupe at the end of the first bill.)
1	Eugenically Speaking	Edward Goodman	Edward Goodman	Original satire has daughter of streetcar magnate bring home a conductor to marry. Cast: Florence Enright (Note: According to the Brooklyn Daily Eagle drama critic she was a moving picture actress)
1	Interior	Maurice Maeterlinck	Edward Goodman	Cast: Walter Frankl, Ralph Roeder, Josephine A. Meyer, Florence Enright, Edwina Behre, Beatrice Savelli, Agnes McCarthy, Remo Bufano, James Terbell
1	Another Interior	Murdock Pemberton (Note: One of the guys who put on the party for Alexander Woollcott in 1919 that sparked the Algonquin Round Table)	Murdock Pemberton	Original pantomime takes place in "Mr. Smith's" stomach.
2	Love of One's Neighbor	Leonid Andreyev	Edward Goodman	Wry tale of solicitude turning to indifference. Cast: Helen Westley, Robert Strange, E.G. Ballantine
2	Moondown	John Reed	Edward Goodman	Debut performance of a static dialogue first printed in The Masses. Cast: Ethel Howard, Josephine A. Meyer
2	Two Blind Beggers and One Less Blind	Philip Moeller	Philip Moeller	Original Grand Guignol style thriller had mixed reception. Cast: Edward Goodman, Ralph Roeder, Walter Frankl, Florence Enright
2	A Shepherd in the Distance	Holland Hudson	Holland Hudson	Original pantomime in black and white, praised by reviewers. Cast: Robert Edwards, Frances Paine, Harry Day, Arvid Paulson, John Alan Haughton
2	My Lady's Honor	Murdock Pemberton		This play wasn't performed on the opening weekend, and may have been dropped from the remaining weeks, due to illness of lead actress
3	In April	Rose Pastor Stokes	Edward Goodman	Tenement girl sacrifices her own happiness. Cast: Marie McNally, Edwina Behre, Robert Strange, Edward Flammer
3	Forbidden Fruit	Octave Feuillet	Edward Goodman	Freely adapted by George Jay Smith. Cast: Florence Enright, Ralph Roeder, Rita Wolfer
3	Saviors	Edward Goodman	Edward Goodman	Original; mother discovers her son has married his mistress. Cast: Alice Harrington, Samuel A. Eliot Jr
3	The Miracle of St. Anthony	Maurice Maeterlinck	Philip Moeller	First US performance. Cast: Ralph Roeder, Josephine A. Meyer, Florence Enright, Helen Westley, Samuel A. Eliot Jr, Walter Frankl
4	The Bear (Note: As the Russian language contains no articles, the title of this play in English is often alternately translated as A Bear)	Anton Chekov	Edward Goodman	Cast: Samuel A. Eliot Jr
4	Interior	Maurice Maeterlinck	Edward Goodman	Cast: Walter Frankl, Ralph Roeder, Josephine A. Meyer, Florence Enright, Edwina Behre, Beatrice Savelli, Agnes McCarthy, Remo Bufano, James Terbell
4	Eugenically Speaking	Edward Goodman	Edward Goodman	Cast: Florence Enright
4	A Shepherd in the Distance	Holland Hudson	Holland Hudson	Pantomime in black and white. Cast: Robert Edwards, Frances Paine, Harry Day, Arvid Paulson, John Alan Haughton

Second season: Oct 1915-May 1916 (Bandbox Theatre), listed by bill, credits incomplete for bills 3 & 4
Bill	Play(s)	Playwright	Director	Notes
1	Fire and Water	Harvey White	Edward Goodman	Ironic comic story of a truce during WWI. Cast: Edward J. Ballantine (Pierre), Frank Conroy (Lt Schiff), Harold Meltzer (Hans), Walter Frankl (Capt. Drouet)
1	A Night of Snow	Roberto Bracco	Ralph Roeder	Bleak tragedy translated from the Italian by Roeder was dropped after two weeks Cast: Ralph Roeder (Salvatore), Agnes McCarthy (Graziella), Alice Harrington (Francesca)
1	The Antick	Percy MacKaye	Edward Goodman	A "Yankee Fantasy" with a romantic ending Cast: Lydia Lopokova (Julie Bonheur), Robert Strange (Rev Jonas Boutwell), Holland Hudson (John Hale), Josephine A. Meyer (Cassandra White), Florence Enright (Myrtle White), Malcolm MacKinnon (Drum Major), Josephine Nivesson (A Boy)
1	Helena's Husband	Philip Moeller	Philip Moeller	Original farce on how Sparta and Troy really went to war. Cast: Frank Conroy (Meneleus), Noël Hadden (Note: Stage name for Noël Haskins) (Helena), Helen Westley (Tsumu), Walter Frankl (Analytikos), Harold Meltzer (Paris)
1	Interior	Maurice Maeterlinck	Edward Goodman	Revival of first season hit replaced A Night of Snow. Cast: Walter Frankl, Ralph Roeder, Josephine A. Meyer, Florence Enright, Edwina Behre, Beatrice Savelli, Agnes McCarthy, Remo Bufano, James Terbell
2	Literature	Arthur Schnitzler	Edward Goodman	Cast: Helen Westley (Margaret), Robert Strange (Clement), Frank Conroy (Gilbert), Jean Strange (Maid)
2	Overtones	Alice Gerstenberg	Edward Goodman	Cast: Josephine A. Meyer (Hettie), Agnes McCarthy (Harriet), Noël Hadden (Maggie), Grace Griswold (Margaret)
2	The Honorable Lover	Roberto Bracco	Philip Moeller	Cast: Florence Enright (Manina), Edward J. Ballantine (Federico), Frank Conroy (Alberto), Josephine A. Meyer (Rosetta), James Terbell (Servant)
2	Whims	Alfred de Musset	Philip Moeller	Cast: Ralph Roeder (Comte de Chavigny), Walter Frankl (Francois), Lydia Lopokova (Comtesse de Chavigny), Helen Westley (Mme. de Lery)
3	The Clod	Lewis Beach	Edward Goodman	A bit of American gothic set during the Civil War. Cast: Josephine A. Meyer (Mary Trask), John King (Trask), Glenn Hunter (Union Soldier), Robert Strange (Rebel Sergeant)
3	The Roadhouse of Arden	Philip Moeller	Philip Moeller	Original whimsical takeoff on Shakespeare's plays with scenes by Robert Lawson. Cast: Frank Conroy (Shakespeare), Walter Frankl (Sir Francis Bacon), Noël Hadden (Miss Immortality)
3	The Tenor	Frank Wedekind	Philip Moeller	Satire, translated from German by Andre Tridon. Cast: Frank Conroy (Oscar Gerardo), Helen Westley (Helen Marova), Margaret Mower (Note: From Santa Barbara, California, she had a long stage career on Broadway after the WSP)
3	The Red Cloak	Josephine A. Meyer and Lawrence Langner	William Pennington	Original pantomime with costumes and sets by Lee Simonson. Cast: Charles Edwards, Florence Enright, Mary MacKinnon, Roland Young, Glenn Hunter
4	Children	Guy Bolton and Tom Carlton		Tense melodrama of lynch mob in the South. Cast: Mary Morris, Ralph Roeder, Mary Timmons, Robert Strange, Frank Conroy, Harold Meltzer
4	The Age of Reason	Cecil Dorrian		A satire of "modern" children and divorce. Cast: Florence Enright (Eleanor Graham), Elinor M. Cox (Beatrice), Helen Westley, Jean Strange, C. Hooper Trask, Marjorie Dean, Harold Meltzer
4	The Magical City	Zoe Akins		Tragedy done in free verse. Cast: Margaret Mower (Petronelle), Edward J. Ballantine (David Brooks), Frank Conroy (Rudolph Phillips), Helen Westley (A Maid), Ralph Roeder, Robert Strange, Glenn Hunter, Dudley G. Tucker
4	Pierre Patelin	(Unknown)		15th Century French farce translated and adapted by Maurice Relonde. Cast: Roland Young, Walter Frankl, Josephine A. Meyer, Glenn Hunter, W.A. Richardson, Spalding Hall, James Tarbell, Mary Morris, Helen Westley, Suzette Stuart, Otto K. Liveright, Lillian Hudson, Harold Hudson, Ralph Roeder, C. Hooper Trask, Samuel A. Eliot, Jr.
S1 (Note: Special one-time showing in May 1916 as a reward for subscribers only)	Aglavaine and Sélysette	Maurice Maeterlinck	Philip Moeller	Translated by Ralph Roeder. Cast: Ralph Roeder (Meleander), Helen Westley, Margaret Mower, Florence Enright, Josephine A. Meyer
5	The Sea Gull	Anton Chekhov	Edward Goodman	Translation by Marian Fell, sets by Lee Simonson. Cast: Roland Young (Constantine), Helen Westley (Irina), Mary Morris (Nina), Florence Enright (Masha), Ralph Roeder (Boris), Walter Frankl, Robert Strange, Frank Conroy, Josephine A. Meyer, Edward J. Ballantine

Summer season: Jun 1916-Sep 1916 (Comedy Theatre), listed by bill, credits incomplete
Bill	Play(s)	Playwright	Director	Notes
1	The Honorable Lover	Roberto Bracco	Philip Moeller	Cast: Florence Enright (Manina), Edward J. Ballantine (Federico), Frank Conroy (Alberto), Elinor M. Cox (Rosetta), James Terbell (Servant)
1	Pierre Patelin	(Unknown)		15th Century French farce translated and adapted by Maurice Relonde. Cast: Roland Young (Patelin), Walter Frankl (The Draper), Marjorie Deen (Guillemette), Ralph Roeder (Tibald Lambkin)
1	The Clod	Lewis Beach	Edward Goodman	Farm woman kills man for breaking her only china cup. Cast: Mary Morris (Mary Trask), John King (Trask), Glenn Hunter (Union Soldier), Robert Strange (Rebel Sergeant)
1	Helena's Husband	Philip Moeller	Philip Moeller	Menelaus connives at getting Paris to steal an annoying Helena. Cast: Frank Conroy (Menelaus), Margaret Mower (Helena), Helen Westley (Tsumu), Walter Frankl (Analytikos), Harold Meltzer (Paris)
2	Literature	Arthur Schnitzler	Edward Goodman	Satire of writers both drawing on their past love for novels. Cast: Helen Westley (Margaret), Ralph Roeder (Clement), Roland Young (Gilbert), Jean Strange (Maid)
2	Eugenically Speaking	Edward Goodman	Edward Goodman	Tycoon's daughter proposes to marry lowly employee. Cast: Florence Enright
2	The Miracle of St. Anthony	Maurice Maeterlinck	Philip Moeller	An unwanted miracle alarms not-so-bereaved heirs. Cast: Ralph Roeder, Florence Enright, Helen Westley, Walter Frankl
2	The Bear	Anton Chekov	Edward Goodman	Cast:

Third season: Oct 1916-May 1917 (Comedy Theatre), listed by bill, credits incomplete for bills 1 and 2
Bill	Play(s)	Playwright	Director	Notes
1	The Sugar House	Alice Brown	Edward Goodman	Sets by John King; Woman pacifies mob Cast: Marjorie Vonnegut (Note: Born Marjorie Potts, she was married to actor Walter Vonnegut) (Wife), Arthur Hohl (Husband), Miriam Kiper, later replaced by Elinor M. Cox (Grandmother Berry), Gwladys Wynne (The Other Woman)
1	Lover's Luck	Georges de Porto-Riche		Sets by Ada Rainey. Philandering artist and suffering wife. Cast: José Ruben (Desroches), Gwladys Wynne (Francoise), Helen Westley
1	A Merry Death	Nikolai Evreinov		Sets by Robert E. Jones; Death as a joke played by everyone. Cast: Edward Balzerit (Harlequin), Philip Tonge (Pierrot), Florence Enright (Columbine), Helen Westley (Death), Erskine Sanford (Doctor)
1	Sisters of Susanna	Philip Moeller	Philip Moeller	Sets by Lee Simonson; The "sisters" hope to attract peeping elders too. Cast: Erskine Sanford (Job), Mary Coates (Zillah), Helen Westley (Myrnah), Arthur Hohl
2	Trifles	Susan Glaspell	Edward Goodman	Feminist tragedy. Cast: T.W. Gibson (Mr. Henderson), Arthur Hohl (Mr. Peters), John King (Mr. Hale), Marjorie Vonnegut (Mrs. Peters), Elinor M. Cox (Mrs. Hale)
2	Another Way Out	Lawrence Langner	Edward Goodman	Satire of bohemian life in Greenwich Village. Cast: Gwladys Wynne (Margaret Marshall), Jean Robb (Note: Jean Strange, wife of WSP member Robert Strange, began using her maiden name for stage credits from this point on.) (Mrs. Abbey), José Ruben (Gerard Larue), Helen Westley (Baroness de Moaurille), Robert Strange (Charles P. K. Fenton)
2	Bushido	Takeda Isumo	Michio Itō	Sets by Michio Itō and Sam C. Evans. Cast: José Ruben (Masuo), Marjorie Vonnegut (Mistress Chiyo), Florence Enright (Mistress Tonami), T.W. Gibson (Genzo), Evelyn Chard (Choma), Spalding Hall (Iwama), Annette Centerno (Tokuzan), Richard Gray (Shusai), Edward Balzerit (Sansukee/Father of Choma), Frank Longacre (Kotaro), Charles E. Swarts (A Soldier), Ralph Murphy (Another Soldier), Glenn Hunter (Gemba), Elinor M. Cox (Mother of Iwama), Eugene Lincoln (Father of Iwama), Jean Robb (Mother of Tokuzan), Katherine Cornell (Shusai's Mother)
2	Altruism	Karl Ettlinger	Edward Goodman	13 characters seek altruism but have none to spare themselves. Cast: José Ruben, Marjorie Vonnegut, Elinor M. Cox, Gwladys Wynne, Helen Westley, and eight others
S1 (Note: This special one-time performance on Jan 14, 1917, was an annual reward for WSP subscribers)	The Life of Man	Leonid Andreyev	Philip Moeller	Sets by Rollo Peters. Cast: José Ruben (Man), Marjorie Vonnegut (Man's Wife), Arthur Hohl (Some One in Grey Called "He"), Helen Westley (Old Attendent)
3	The Last Straw	Bosworth Crocker		Cast: Marjorie Vonnegut (Mrs. Bauer), Glenn Hunter (Lane), Arthur Hohl (Mr. Bauer), Frank Longacre (Fritzl), Nicholas Long (Karl), Emily Planter (Mrs. Moehler), Johanna Snow (Mrs. McAllister)
3	A Private Account	Georges Courteline		Late addition to the bill marked Mower's return to the WSP. Cast: José Ruben (Edward Trielle), Margaret Mower (Valentine Trielle)
3	The Hero of Santa Maria	Kenneth Sawyer Goodman and Ben Hecht		Sets by M. Rienecke. Cast: Robert Strange (Martin Fisher), T.W. Gibson (Edward M. Fisher), Helen Westley (Almira Fisher), Alfred E. Hohl (Nathan Fisher), Holland Hudson (Samuel M. Hines), Jean Robb (Mrs. Hines), Betty Flammer (Mrs. Foss), Edward F. Flammer (Edward P. Foss), Edward Balzerit (Theodore Q. Wilkinson)
3	The Death of Tintagiles	Maurice Maeterlinck		Translated by Philip Moeller, sets by Rollo Peters. Cast: Gwladys Wynne (Ygraine), Frank Longacre (Tintagiles), Margaret Mower (Bellangere), Edward Balzerit (Aglovale), Helen Westley (First Servant), Noël Hadden (Second Servant), Katherine Cornell (Third Servant)
4	Plots and Playwrights	Edward Massey	Edward Flammer	Interplay between a short story writer and a playwright. Cast: Ralph Bunker (Caspar Gay), Jean Robb (Maggie), Ralph Roeder (Joseph Hastings), Helen Westley (Mrs. Hammond), Charles Meredith (Tom Burch), Florence Enright (Molly Hammond), Arthur Hohl (Frank Devoy), Katherine Cornell (Alice Merriam), Ruby Craven (Bessie Dodge), Alice Radier (Edme Jackes), Philip Tonge (Dick Griffiths), Edward Balzerit (William Lloyd), Robert Strange (Sidney Griffiths), T.W. Gibson (Bob Douglas), Ole Stadstad (Old Clothes Man/A Waiter), Phyllis Critcherson (Organ Grinder's Wife), A.E. Gillette (Police Sergeant), C.N. Hare (A Patrolman)
4	The Poor Fool	Hermann Bahr	Edward Goodman	Obscure comparison of three brothers' lives in their declining years. Cast: T.W. Gibson (Regel), Frederick Rider (Huster), Arthur Hohl (Vinzenz Haist), Marjorie Vonnegut (Sophie), Ralph Roeder (Edward Haist), Edward Balzerit (Dr. Halma), José Ruben (Hugo Haist)
4	Sganarelle	Molière	Philip Moeller	Translated by Philip Moeller into rhyming couplets, sets by Lee Simonson. Cast: Margaret Mower (Celle), T.W. Gibson (Gorgibus), Elinor M. Cox (Celle's Maid), Arthur Hohl (Sganarelle), Gwladys Wynne (Sganarelle's Wife), Phyllis Critcherson (A Servant), Edward Balzerit (Lelle), (Note: José Ruben was listed in the theater program for this role, but was recovering from illness and so yielded it to Balzerit, according to The Sun reviewer.) James Terbell (Gros-Rene), Helen Westley (A Relative), Frank Longacre (A Page), Ralph Roeder (Villebrequin)
5	Ghosts	Henrik Ibsen		Cast: Mary Shaw (Mrs. Alving), José Ruben (Oswald Alving), Arthur Hohl (Pastor Manders), T.W. Gibson (Jacob Engstrand), Margaret Mower (Regina Engstrand)

Summer season: May 1917-Sep 1917 (Comedy Theatre), listed by bill, credits incomplete
Bill	Play(s)	Playwright	Director	Notes
1	Another Way Out	Lawrence Langner	Edward Goodman	Satire of bohemian life in Greenwich Village. Cast: Gwladys Wynne (Margaret Marshall), Jean Robb (Mrs. Abbey), Ralph Bunker (Gerard Larue), Helen Westley (Baroness de Moaurille), Robert Strange (Charles P. K. Fenton)
1	Pariah	August Strindberg		Translation by Edith and Warner Oland. Cast: Arthur Hohl (Mr. X), Ralph Roeder (Mr. Y)
1	Plots and Playwrights	Edward Massey	Edward Flammer	Cast: Ralph Bunker (Caspar Gay), Jean Robb (Maggie), Ralph Roeder (Joseph Hastings), Helen Westley (Mrs. Hammond), Charles Meredith (Tom Burch), Florence Enright (Molly Hammond), Arthur Hohl (Frank Devoy), Katherine Cornell (Alice Merriam), Ruby Craven (Bessie Dodge), Alice Radier (Edme Jackes), Philip Tonge (Dick Griffiths), Edward Balzerit (William Lloyd), Robert Strange (Sidney Griffiths), T.W. Gibson (Bob Douglas), Ole Stadstad (Old Clothes Man/A Waiter), Loretta Howe (Organ Grinder's Wife), A.E. Gillette (Police Sergeant), C.N. Hare (A Patrolman)

Fourth season: Oct 1917-May 1918 (Comedy Theatre), listed by bill, credits incomplete
Bill	Play(s)	Playwright	Director	Notes
1	Blind Alleys	Grace Latimer Wright		Cast: Frederick Roland (Husband), Katherine Cornell (Sister), Helen Westley (Mother)
1	The Avenue	Fenimore Merrill	Arthur Hohl	Set by Rollo Peters. Cast: Helen Westley (Mme. Grady), Madeline Snyder (Rosy), Marjorie Vonnegut (Lily), James Terbell (Pat), Elizabeth Patterson (Mrs. Fitch), Jay Strong (Van Vliet), Rienzi de Cordova (Barlow), Florence Enright (Elsie Price), Robert Strange (Mr. Fitch), Adele Vaughn (The Blonde), Marjorie McClintock (The Brunette), Frances Ross (The Titian)
1	In the Zone	Eugene O'Neill	Edward Flammer	Set by Rollo Peters. Cast: Frederick Roland (Smitty), Eugene Lincoln (Scotty), Arthur Hohl (Driscoll), Robert Strange (Davis), William Gillette (Olson), Edward Balzerit (Ivan), Jay Strong (Yank), Rienzi de Cordova (Cocky)
1	His Widow's Husband	Jacinto Benavente		Translated by Keith G. Underhill. Cast: Helen Westley (Widow), Frederick Roland, Arthur Hohl
2	Neighbors	Zona Gale		Midwest character-driven comedy with a slightly tragic subplot. Cast: Kate Morgan (Grandma), Helen Westley (Mis' Diantha Abel), Marjorie McClintock (Mis' Elmira Moran), Florence Enright (Mis' Trot), Alfred E. Hohl (Peter), Marjorie Vonnegut (Inez), Katherine Cornell, Robert Strange
2	The Critic's Comedy	Samuel Kaplan		Middle-aged female critic yields to wastrel husband when found with famous actor. Cast: Helen Westley (Adele Newman), Jay Strong (Young Husband), Frederick Roland (Actor), Florence Enright (Stenographer)
2	The Girl in the Coffin	Theodore Dreiser		Set by Rollo Peters. Father rages at unknown lover of daughter, dead from botched abortion. Cast: Frederick Roland (William Magnet), Arthur Hohl (John Ferguson), Kate Morgan (Hannah), Marjorie Vonnegut (Mrs. Margaret Pickert)
2	Yum Chapab	J. Garcia Pimental and Beatrice de Holtoir	Philip Moeller	Set by L. de Palacio. Pantomime on Mayan folk tale of Yucatán. Cast: Helen Westley (A Childless Woman), Frances Ross (Princess), Katherine Cornell (Player of Instruments)
3	Suppressed Desires	George Cram Cook and Susan Glaspell		A satire on over analyzing life in terms of Freud. Cast: Clare Tree Major (Henrietta Brewster), Robert Strange (Stephen Brewster), Marjorie Vonnegut (Mabel Brewster)
3	The Sandbar Queen	George Cronyn		Misogynist is done in by one drink and a scarlet lady. Cast: Arthur Hohl (Flatboat Slim), Edward Balzerit (Wingy), Abram Gillette (Blacky), Jay Strong (Shotgun Smith), Hugh Gillespie (Shorty Gerety), Eugene Lincoln (The Inspector), Helen Westley (The Sandbar Queen)
3	Habit	Frank Dare		Death confronts two couples and finds a welcome from one woman. Cast: Clare Tree Major (Antoinette Baxter), Frederick Roland (Frederick Baxter), Marjorie Vonnegut (Frances Moorman), Robert Strange (Burley Moorman), Jay Strong (A Visitor)
3	Pokey	Philip Moeller		Moeller goes to the Shavian historical comedy well once too often. Cast: Florence Enright (Pocahantas), Frederick Roland (John Rolfe), Robert Strange (Capt. John Smith), Abram Gillette (Powhatan), Helen Westley (Powhatan's Wife), Kate Morgan (Powhatan's Mother), Jay Strong (Storm-in-the-Eye), Eugene Lincoln (Hall-in-the-Nose), Victor Ioucelli (Wind-in-the-Ear)
4	Youth	Miles Malleson		Trials of a young playwright's love life set on theatre backstage. Cast: Majorie Vonnegut (Nina Geoffreys), Saxon Kling (Douglas Hetherly), John King (Joe), Robert Strange (Frank Denton), Edward Balzerit (Ferris), Arthur Hohl (Coell Wainwright), Jay Strong (May), Edward Flammer (Antony Gunn), James Terbell (Tom), Samuel Jaffe (Rev. John Hetherly), Helen Westley (Estelle)
4	Suppressed Desires	George Cram Cook and Susan Glaspell		Added to this bill after the opening week. Cast: Helen Westley (Henrietta Brewster), Robert Strange (Stephen Brewster), Marjorie Vonnegut (Mabel Brewster)
5	Mrs Warren's Profession	George Bernard Shaw	Mary Shaw	Cast: Diantha Pattison (Vivian Warren), Arthur Hohl (Mr. Praed), Mary Shaw (Mrs. Warren), Robert Strange (Sir George Crofts), Saxon Kling (Frank Gardner), Samuel Jaffe (Rev. Samuel Gardner)
6	The Home of the Free	Elmer Reizenstein	Philip Moeller	Cast: Saxon Kling (Robert Ingersoll Burke), Elizabeth Patterson (Mrs. Felicia Hemens Burke), Florence Enright (Genevieve Sweet), R.E. McDonald (John Calvin Burke)
6	Salome (Note: Dropped May 12, 1918)	Oscar Wilde	Edward Goodman	Salome's dance arranged by Adolph Bolm, set by Rollo Peters. Cast: Rollo Peters (Syrian Youth), Gareth Hughes (Page), Eugene Lincoln (A Soldier), R.E. McDonald (2nd Soldier), Harold Winston (A Cappodocian), James Skinner (Naaman the Executioner), Mme. Yorska (Salome, dau of Herodias), Edward Balzerit (Slave), Walter Hampden (The Prophet Iokaanan), Louis Calvert (Herod), Helen Westley (Herodias), Fenimore Merrill (Young Roman), John King (A Jew), John Gibbs (Another Jew), Ian Kieth (A Third Jew), J. Luray Butler (A Nazerene), Walter Street (Another Nazarene), (Slaves): Emily Bolleau, Laura Howe, Mary Claytes, Joan MacKyle, Olga Hammerslaugh, Gertrude Phillips
6	Lonesome Like	Harold Brighouse	Whitford Kane	Lovelorn young man from Lancashire rescues an elderly woman from the poor house. Cast: Kate Morgan (Sarah Ormerod), Majorie Vonnegut (Emma Brierly), Whitford Kane (Sam Horrocks), Saxon Kling (Rev. Frank Alleyne)
6	Close the Book (Note: Added May 13, 1918)	Susan Glaspell		Girl thinks she's a gypsy because of her name. Cast: Florence Enright (Jhansi), T.W. Gibson (Peton Adams Root), Elizabeth Patterson (Mrs. Root), Helen Westley (Mrs. Peyton), J. Luray Butler (George Peyton), Marjorie Vonnegut (Bessie Root), R.E. McDonald (Senator Byrd), Jean Robb (Mrs. Byrd)
6	The Rope (Note: Added May 13, 1918)	Eugene O'Neill		Semi-crazed family lives on hate. Cast: Kate Morgan (Mary Sweeney), Whitford Kane (Abraham Bentley), Josephine A. Meyer (Annie Sweeney), Robert Strange (Pat Sweeney), Effingham Pinto (Luke Bentley)
