= Newark Evening News =

The Newark Evening News
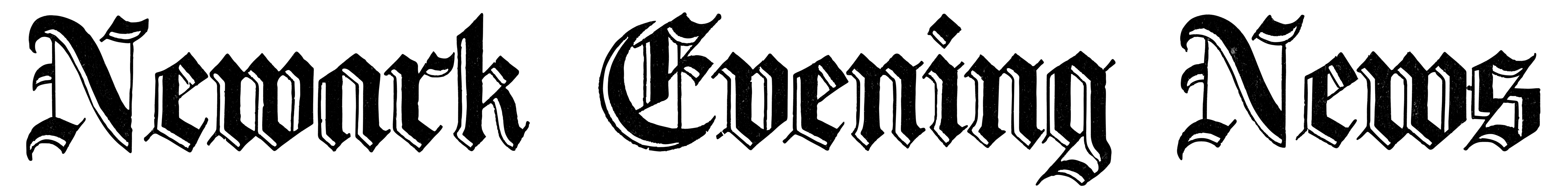
- Type: Daily newspaper
- Format: Broadsheet
- Founded: 1883
- Ceased publication: 1972

The Newark Evening News was an American newspaper published in Newark, New Jersey. As New Jersey's largest city, Newark played a major role in New Jersey's journalistic history. At its apex, The News was widely regarded as the newspaper of record in New Jersey. For much of its life it had the largest circulation of any New Jersey newspaper, and in 1963 was the 20th ranked national newspaper by evening circulation numbers. The Newark News has been digitized by the Newark Public Library and Advantage Archives.

== History ==
The News was founded in 1883 by Wallace Scudder, with the first issue published Sept 1, 1883. The grandson of Wallace Scudder, Richard Scudder, worked as the newspaper's publisher from 1952 until 1972.

For years, the paper thrived as a daily and Sunday paper. It had bureaus in Montclair, Elizabeth, Metuchen, Morristown, Plainfield, Kearny, and Belmar. There were also bureaus in the New Jersey State House in Trenton and in Washington, D.C. The paper had had five editorial writers, an editorial cartoonist, a military writer, an aviation writer, and a Sunday magazine.

In 1970, the paper was sold to Media General. In February 1971, the newsroom, which had never been organized, voted to go out on strike and walked out in May 1971, which was supported by labor leaders around the state.

The strike lasted almost a full year — not settling until April 1972. It faced increasing competition from the Newark Star-Ledger, and for its final four months, the daily editions of the Newark Evening News were printed on Star-Ledger presses. That was because the paper's new owners had sold the presses, along with the Sunday News edition, to the Star-Ledger.

The paper folded on August 31, 1972.

The former headquarters of the paper in Downtown Newark at 215-217 Market St (or 111 Mulberry) is now a residential condominium.

== Historic research ==
Since its demise, the Newark Public Library acquired the paper's records. The Charles F. Cummings New Jersey Information Center at Newark Public Library owns the News's indices and clippings files, as well as a full run of microfilm. They have digitized the paper up through 1972.

== Distinguished Newark Evening News alumni ==
- John T. Cunningham, prolific and wide-ranging writer on the history of New Jersey.
- Lloyd M. Felmly, Editor of the Newark Evening News and a friend of public health. There is an award set up in his honor. Lloyd M. Felmly Award: Established in 1976, the annual award is presented to an individual for outstanding contribution in the media to the cause of public health in New Jersey.
- Howard Roger Garis, reporter, who created the Uncle Wiggily character as a News reporter. His Uncle Wiggily books later sold in the millions, and the Wiggily character appeared daily in the News for nearly four decades. He also wrote the first 32 volumes in the Tom Swift, series, written under the pen name Victor Appleton.
- Lilian McNamara (Garis). The first female reporter on the News, she later married fellow News reporter, Howard Garis. She helped launch the Bobbsey Twins series and wrote some of the early volumes.
- George P. Oslin, leading reporter. He later became Public Relations head of Western Union, and in 1933 invented the singing telegram.
- Lute Pease, News editorial cartoonist and winner of the 1949 Pulitzer Prize for Editorial Cartooning for "Who, Me?"
- Richard Reeves, writer for the News from 1963 to 1965. Later he spent one year at the New York Herald Tribune and then The New York Times as Chief Political Correspondent. His best-selling books included President Kennedy: Profile of Power (1993), and President Nixon: Alone in the White House (2001). He is currently a syndicated columnist and lecturer at the Annenberg School for Communication in Los Angeles.
- Andrew E. Svenson worked for the News from 1932 until 1948. After leaving the newspaper, he joined the Stratemeyer Syndicate, where he became a partner in 1961. Svenson shared the major writing chores with Harriet Adams. Under a variety of pseudonyms, many shared with other authors, Svenson wrote books for the Hardy Boys, Bobbsey Twins, Tom Swift, and Honey Bunch series.
- Arthur Sylvester headed the News bureau in Washington, D.C.. In 1960, he joined the Kennedy administration as Assistant Secretary of Defense for Public Affairs.
- Cecil Dorrian was one of two accredited female war correspondents during World War I and wrote for the News
