= Mary Morris (American actress) =

American actress (1895–1970)

- Born: June 24, 1895; Swampscott, Massachusetts
- Died: January 16, 1970 (aged 74); New York City, New York
- Occupation: Actress
- Years active: 1916–1956
- Spouses: James E Meigham Jr.; Reginald R. Richard

Mary Morris (June 24, 1895 – January 16, 1970) was an American stage actress with a long and varied career. She was born to George Perry Morris and Martha Sophia (née Turner).

She was educated in the Brookline, Massachusetts Public Schools and at Radcliffe College. She began in Amateur theatricals at the Bandbox Theatre, before becoming an Understudy with the Washington Square Players. She made her professional debut with the WSP in San Francisco in 1916 in The Clod.

Perhaps her most famous stage role was that of Victoria Van Brett, the elderly, Machiavellian spinster in the Elizabeth McFadden thriller Double Door. She made such an impression as the villain of the piece that Paramount Pictures, buying the screen rights to the play, insisted on Mary Morris for the leading role. She was then touring in the play, so Paramount delayed production until she could report to the studio in Hollywood. Double Door was her only motion picture; she received rave reviews for her performance. After a triumphant preview, according to Motion Picture Daily, "Paramount has decided to build Mary Morris into a female Boris Karloff. The studio is now looking for a story of the horror type, in which to star the actress." Morris didn't take the studio's plans seriously; she disliked the Hollywood scene and returned immediately to the stage. By the summer of 1934, with the screen version of Double Door playing in neighborhood theaters, Mary Morris was touring New England in the stage version.

== Selected stage credits ==
- The Seagull (1916)
- The Spook Sonata (1923)
- The Crime in the Whistler Room (1924)
- Desire Under the Elms (1924)
- Hidden (1927)
- At the Bottom (1930)
- Night over Taos (1932)
- Camille (1932)
- Double Door (1933–34)
- Granite (1936)
- The Father (1949)
- A Month in the Country (1956)
