= Taming the Wild =

1936 film by Robert F. Hill

- Directed by: Bob Hill
- Written by: Al Martin
- Based on: "Shipmates" by Peter B. Kyne
- Produced by: Sam Katzman; Ed Rote
- Starring: Rod La Rocque; Maxine Doyle; Barbara Pepper
- Cinematography: William Hyer
- Edited by: Earl Turner
- Production company: Victory Pictures
- Distributed by: Victory Pictures
- Release date: February 15, 1936
- Running time: 55 minutes
- Country: United States
- Language: English

Taming the Wild, also known as Madcap, is a 1936 American comedy film directed by Bob Hill for producer Sam Katzman's poverty row studio Victory Pictures and starring Rod La Rocque.

== Plot ==
Madcap society girl June Bolton has a talent for trouble. Trying to evade a subpoena in connection with one of her misadventures, she winds up in jail and has to be bailed out by the family attorney, Dick Clayton. But June is soon in trouble again, this time involved with a mob boss and a shady lady. Exasperated by his wealthy client's reckless escapades, Clayton determines to quit... until he realizes he has fallen in love.

== Cast ==
- Rod La Rocque as Dick Clayton
- Maxine Doyle as June Bolton
- Bryant Washburn as Bert Graham
- Barbara Pepper as Hazel White
- Donald Kerr as Reporter Jimmy Taylor
- Zella Russell as Mrs. Bolton
- Reed Howes as Chuck
- Vincent Dennis as Red
- Budd Buster as Henchman (uncredited)
- Jack Chefe as Headwaiter (uncredited)
- Olin Francis as Hotel Knickerbocker Doorman (uncredited)
- Fred Parker as Husband (uncredited)
- Forrest Taylor as Police Captain (uncredited)
