= Richard Reeves (American writer) =

American writer (1936–2020)

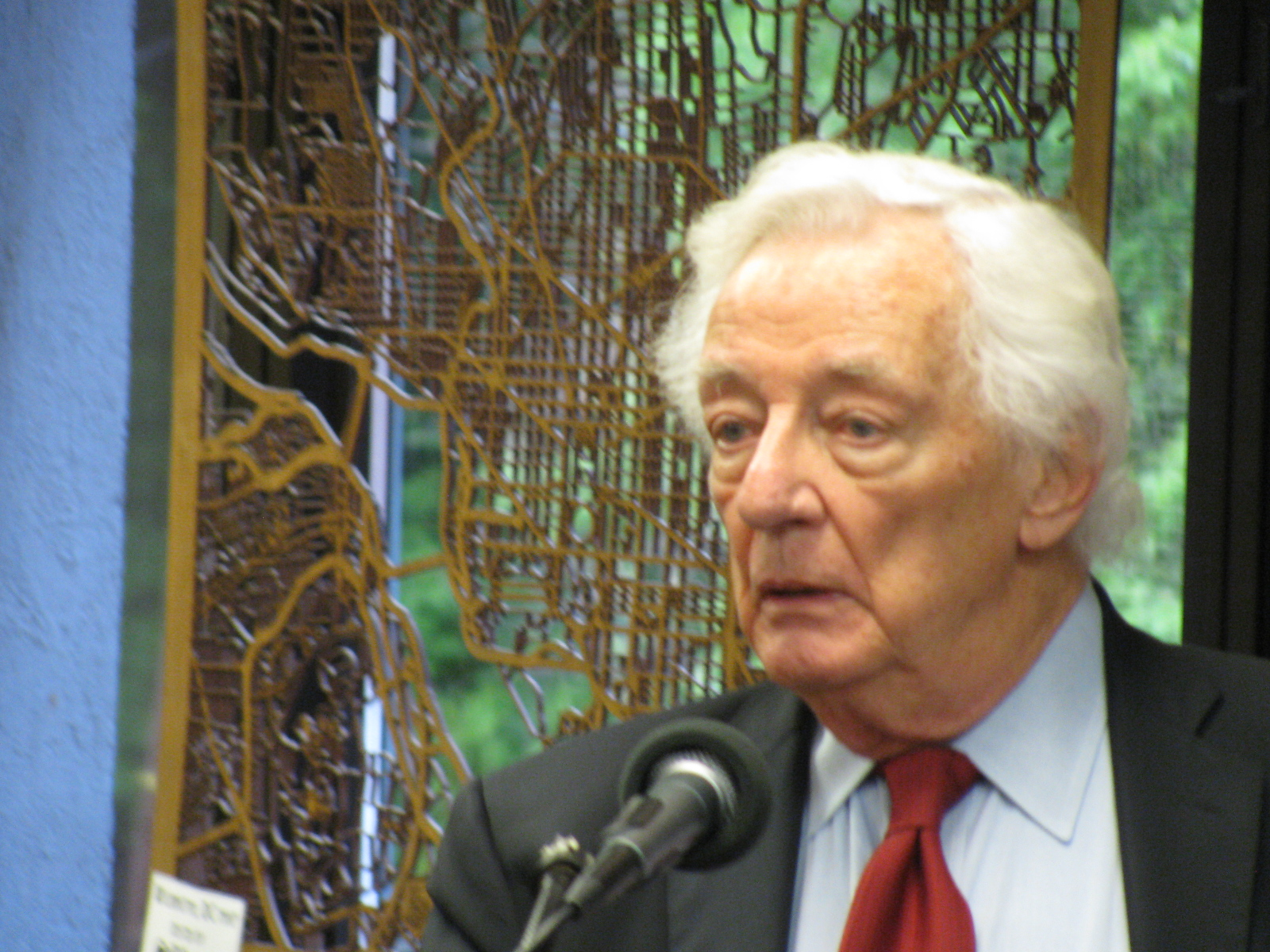
- Born: Richard Furman Reeves; November 28, 1936; New York City, U.S.
- Died: March 25, 2020 (aged 83); Los Angeles, California, U.S.
- Education: Stevens Institute of Technology
- Spouse: Catherine O'Neill
- Children: Five
- Writing career
- Genre: History

Richard Furman Reeves (November 28, 1936 – March 25, 2020) was an American writer, syndicated columnist, and lecturer at the Annenberg School for Communication at the University of Southern California in Los Angeles.

== Life and career ==
Reeves was born in 1936 in New York City, the son of Dorothy (Forshay), an actress, and Furman W. Reeves, a judge in Hudson County, New Jersey. He received his Mechanical Engineering degree from Stevens Institute of Technology in 1960. After graduation, he spent a year working as an engineer for Ingersoll-Rand, after which he moved to journalism. From 1961–1965, Reeves co-founded and worked for the Phillipsburg Free Press (New Jersey), then worked for Newark Evening News and the New York Herald Tribune before being assigned the post of Chief Political Correspondent for The New York Times in 1966. In 1971, Reeves left the Times to lecture at Hunter College.

The opinions of Reeves generally had a liberal bent—he opposed the war to topple Saddam Hussein as "stupid and unnecessary" (column, March 19, 2003)—but shunned "extreme" leftist positions. He paid close attention to happenings overseas and often filled his columns with explanations of current trends based on history. Many of his columns focused on the world's reaction to political actions of the United States.

He also published nine books, mostly about American politics. In 1993, he appeared in the film Dave, one of several journalists who played themselves in the film.

Reeves' weekly column, carried by Universal Press Syndicate, appeared in more than 160 newspapers across the United States after 1979. He also wrote a monthly column from Paris in Travel and Leisure magazine.

He was married to Catherine O'Neill, founder of the Women's Commission for Women and Children Refugees. Together they had five children and divided their time between Los Angeles and New York City.

In October 2004 in an article entitled "To begin with, the President is a fool", he shared his belief that John Kerry would win the 2004 presidential election. In the article, Reeves indicated that he voted absentee for the Democrat. He then shared his bias by saying: "Biased? Of course. That's why I write this column: to share my bias. I am always amazed when I get letters, many of them, accusing me of being a 'liberal' or, a lot worse, an 'elitist.' Yes, I am. Hello!"

In November 2005, Reeves stated that George W. Bush could be regarded as the worst president in U.S. history, noting: "The History News Network at George Mason University has just polled historians informally on the Bush record. Four hundred and fifteen, about a third of those contacted, answered, making the project as unofficial as it was interesting. These were the results: 338 said they believed Bush was failing, while 77 said he was succeeding. Fifty said they thought he was the worst president ever."

Reeves died on March 25, 2020, in Los Angeles from cardiac arrest.

== Bibliography ==
External videos
- Booknotes interview with Reeves on President Kennedy: Profile of Power, November 22, 1993, C-SPAN
- Presentation by Reeves on President Kennedy: Profile of Power, November 22, 1994, C-SPAN
- Presentation by Reeves on President Kennedy: Profile of Power, January 30, 1995, C-SPAN
- Washington Journal interview with Reeves on What the People Know, November 5, 1998, C-SPAN
- Presentation by Reeves on What the People Know, January 19, 1999, C-SPAN
- Presentation by Reeves on President Nixon: Alone in the White House, October 15, 2001, C-SPAN
- Presentation by Reeves on President Nixon: Alone in the White House, November 17, 2001, C-SPAN
- Presentation by Reeves on President Reagan: The Triumph of Imagination, January 19, 2006, C-SPAN
- Presentation by Reeves on A Force of Nature, January 16, 2008, C-SPAN
- Presentation by Reeves on Daring Young Men, January 13, 2010, C-SPAN
- Presentation by Reeves on Infamy, December 4, 2014, C-SPAN
- Interview with Reeves on Infamy, March 11, 2017, C-SPAN

- A Ford, Not a Lincoln, Harcourt Brace, 1975, ISBN 0-15-132302-X, ISBN 978-0-15-132302-9
- Old Faces of 1976, Harper and Row, 1976, ISBN 0-06-013526-3, ISBN 978-0-06-013526-3
- Convention, Harcourt Trade Publishers, 1977, ISBN 0-15-122582-6, ISBN 978-0-15-122582-8
- American Journey: Traveling with Tocqueville in Search of Democracy in America, Simon & Schuster, 1982, ISBN 0-671-24746-8, ISBN 978-0-671-24746-1
- Jet Lag: The Running Commentary of a Bicoastal Reporter, Andrews McMeel Publishing, LLC, 1982, ISBN 0-8362-6207-7, ISBN 978-0-8362-6207-0
- Passage to Peshawar: Pakistan: Between the Hindu Kush and the Arabian Sea, Simon & Schuster, 1983, ISBN 0-671-60539-9, ISBN 978-0-671-60539-1
- The Reagan Detour, Simon & Schuster, 1984, ISBN 0-671-60702-2, ISBN 978-0-671-60702-9
- President Kennedy: Profile of Power, Simon & Schuster, 1993, ISBN 0-671-64879-9, ISBN 978-0-671-64879-4
- Running in Place: How Bill Clinton Disappointed America, Andrews McMeel Publishing, LLC, 1996, ISBN 0-8362-1091-3, ISBN 978-0-8362-1091-0
- Family Travels -- Around the World in 30 (Or So) Days, Andrews McMeel Publishing, LLC, 1997, ISBN 0-8362-5285-3, ISBN 978-0-8362-5285-9
- Do the Media Govern?, SAGE Publications, 1997, ISBN 0-8039-5606-1, ISBN 978-0-8039-5606-3, (with Shanto Iyengar)
- What The People Know: Freedom and the Press, Harvard University Press, 1998, ISBN 0-674-61622-7, ISBN 978-0-674-61622-6
- President Nixon: Alone in the White House, Simon & Schuster, 2001, ISBN 0-7432-2565-1, ISBN 978-0-7432-2565-6
- President Reagan: The Triumph of Imagination, Simon & Schuster, 2005, ISBN 0-7432-8230-2, ISBN 978-0-7432-8230-7
- A Force of Nature: The Frontier Genius of Ernest Rutherford. W. W. Norton. 2008 [2007]. p. 208. ISBN 978-0-3933-3369-5., about New Zealand born physicist Ernest Rutherford
- Daring Young Men: The Heroism and Triumph of The Berlin Airlift - June 1948-May 1949, Simon & Schuster, 2010, ISBN 1416541195, ISBN 978-1416541196
- Infamy: The Shocking Story of the Japanese-American Internment in World War II, Henry Holt and Co., 2015, ISBN 978-08050-9408-4

== Awards ==
- 1978: Silver Gavel, American Bar Association
- 1980: Emmy, for Lights, Camera, Politics!, ABC News
- 1982: Christopher Award
- 1983: Book of the Year, Christophers
- 1983: Columbia-Dupont Award, for Struggle for Birmingham, PBS
- 1984: George Foster Peabody Award, for Red Star over Khyber, PBS
- 1984: Peabody Award, Columbia University
- 1993: Book of the Year, Washington Monthly
- 1993: Non-Fiction Book of the Year, PEN
- 1997: Goldman Lecturer on American Civilization and Government, Library of Congress
- 1998: Carey McWilliams Award (distinguished contributions to the understanding of American politics), American Political Science Association
- 1998: Lifetime Achievement Award, National Society of Newspaper Columnists
- Literary Lion, New York Public Library

== Honorary degrees ==
- Stevens Institute of Technology
- Drew University
- St. Joseph's College
