= The Greenwich Village Follies of 1919 =

Musical revue with music by A. Baldwin Sloane

The Greenwich Village Follies of 1919 is a musical revue in two acts with music by A. Baldwin Sloane and lyrics co-authored by John Murray Anderson and Arthur Swanstrom. Anderson also wrote the book in collaboration with Philip Bartholomae. The first of The Greenwich Village Follies series of revues, the work premiered Off-Broadway at the Greenwich Village Theatre on July 15, 1919. Theatre scholar Thomas S. Hischak described it as "the first Off-Broadway musical to gain wide recognition in New York", and credited designer Charles Buckles Falls for adopting many new innovations in set design both original to him and from Europe which had a significant impact on future set design on Broadway. Shirley Baker was also praised for her costume designs.

The Greenwich Village Follies transferred to Broadway where it opened at the Nora Bayes Theatre on September 9, 1919. Its final performance on Broadway was on January 31, 1920. Collectively, the show was performed a total of 232 times between the two theaters. The production starred Bessie McCoy Davis, Cecil Cunningham, Harry Delf, Bobby Edwards, Harry K. Morton, and Ted Lewis and his Orchestra.
