= Double Door (film) =

1934 film by Charles Vidor

- Directed by: Charles Vidor
- Screenplay by: Jack Cunningham; Gladys Lehman
- Based on: Double Door by Elizabeth A. McFadden
- Produced by: E. Lloyd Sheldon
- Starring: Evelyn Venable; Mary Morris; Anne Revere; Kent Taylor
- Cinematography: Harry Fischbeck
- Edited by: James Smith
- Production company: Paramount Pictures
- Distributed by: Paramount Pictures
- Release date: May 4, 1934
- Running time: 75 minutes
- Country: United States
- Language: English

Double Door is a 1934 American pre-Code horror mystery film directed by Charles Vidor, written by Jack Cunningham and Gladys Lehman, and starring Evelyn Venable, Mary Morris, Anne Revere, and Kent Taylor. The film follows a young bride who finds herself tormented by her wealthy husband's abusive spinster sister in their New York City mansion. It is based on the 1933 Broadway play of the same name by Elizabeth A. McFadden and was billed in the opening credits as "The play that made Broadway gasp". Both Morris and Revere reprised their Broadway roles in the film. Though Morris had a long stage career, this is her only film performance.

The film was released on May 4, 1934, by Paramount Pictures.

== Plot ==
In 1910 Manhattan, Victoria Van Brett is a bitter, domineering spinster who lives an isolated life with her half-sister, Caroline, in the palatial mansion built by their late industrialist father. Victoria keeps the home shuttered and rarely leaves, controlling the operations of the residence, as well as Caroline's daily life. The sisters' younger half-brother, Rip, returns home to wed Anne Darrow, a nurse who saved his life. Victoria believes Anne to be a social climber after the family money, and surreptitiously has Rip's name removed from the family will on his wedding day. She inflicts other cruelties on the wedding day, including sabotaging the organ during Anne's walk down the aisle.

While Rip and Anne go on their honeymoon, Victoria forces Caroline to take her side, threatening to lock Caroline away in a soundproof vault, where Caroline will face death by suffocation. Victoria demands that Rip and Anne return to handle the affairs of the estate. Rip informs Victoria that he and Anne plan to move out of the familial mansion and purchase a home of their own. This enrages Victoria.

Rip recounts childhood memories of Victoria's abusive behavior toward him after their father died. Anne attempts to retaliate against Victoria, but at a dinner party Victoria accuses Anne of having an affair with the family doctor, John Lucas. Anne declares she is leaving the mansion.

Victoria offers to send Anne away with heirloom pearls that Victoria previously denied Anne on her wedding day. Anne is lured by Victoria to the soundproof vault in the mansion. Once in the vault, Victoria locks the door behind her, sealing Anne inside. Caroline hears Anne's initial scream before the vault closes, and rushes to the room, but Victoria insists that Caroline was only having a nightmare. Caroline notices Anne's suitcase on the floor before she returns to bed.

Rip and attorney Mortimer attempt to locate the missing Anne, whom Victoria asserts left Rip for John. The men ultimately locate the vault and Anne is saved. Caroline finally defies Victoria by telling her she is leaving with Rip and Anne. Victoria tries to lure Caroline into the vault with her, but Caroline refuses and departs. Mortimer reverts the family will back to Rip, and blackmails Victoria with her attempted murder of Anne, threatening to report her to police if she does not sign the will. After Mortimer exits the room, Victoria realizes they have forgotten the pearls. As she enters the vault to retrieve them, the door closes behind her and seals her doom.

== Cast ==
- Evelyn Venable as Anne Darrow
- Mary Morris as Victoria Van Brett
- Anne Revere as Caroline Van Brett
- Kent Taylor as Rip Van Brett
- Guy Standing as Mortimer Neff
- Colin Tapley as Dr. John Lucas
- Virginia Howell as Avery
- Halliwell Hobbes as Mr. Chase
- Frank Dawson as Telson
- Helen Shipman as Louise
- Leonard Carey as William

== Production ==
The film was adapted from the stage play of the same name by Elizabeth McFadden, which was opened on Broadway in 1933. Both Mary Morris and Anne Revere reprised their stage roles for the film version. The characters of Caroline and Victoria Van Brett were both loosely based on the last-surviving sisters of the Wendels, a powerful New York City family who resided in a large mansion together (seven siblings in total, all unmarried) in isolation for most of their lives.

Filming was to begin in January 1934 but Paramount waited until lead actress Mary Morris, who was playing in the stage version in Philadelphia, had finished her engagement and could join the production team in Hollywood.

== Reception ==
The New York Times review was favorable: "The film version of Miss McFadden's play is a careful and intelligent copy of the original." Morris was praised for her "highly effective performance", while "Evelyn Venable, as the young wife, and Anne Revere, as the sister (the part she played on the stage), are admirable foils for the cruel old witch. They are reinforced effectively by Kent Taylor, Sir Guy Standing and Colin Tapley."

Mary Morris received superior notices for her screen performance. Paramount tried to sign her for additional films, but Morris was unimpressed by the Hollywood scene and returned immediately to the stage, where she continued to tour the New England states in Double Door during the summer of 1934.

== Sources ==
- Erickson, Hal (2017). Any Resemblance to Actual Persons: The Real People Behind 400+ Fictional Movie Characters. Jefferson, North Carolina: McFarland. ISBN 978-1-476-66605-1.
- Soister, John T. (2004). Up from the Vault: Rare Thrillers of the 1920s and 1930s. Jefferson, North Carolina: McFarland. ISBN 978-0-786-41745-2.
- Soister, John T.; Nicolella, Henry (2014). American Silent Horror, Science Fiction and Fantasy Feature Films, 1913-1929. Jefferson, North Carolina: McFarland. ISBN 978-0-786-48790-5.
