= Marian Fell Library =

- U.S. National Register of Historic Places
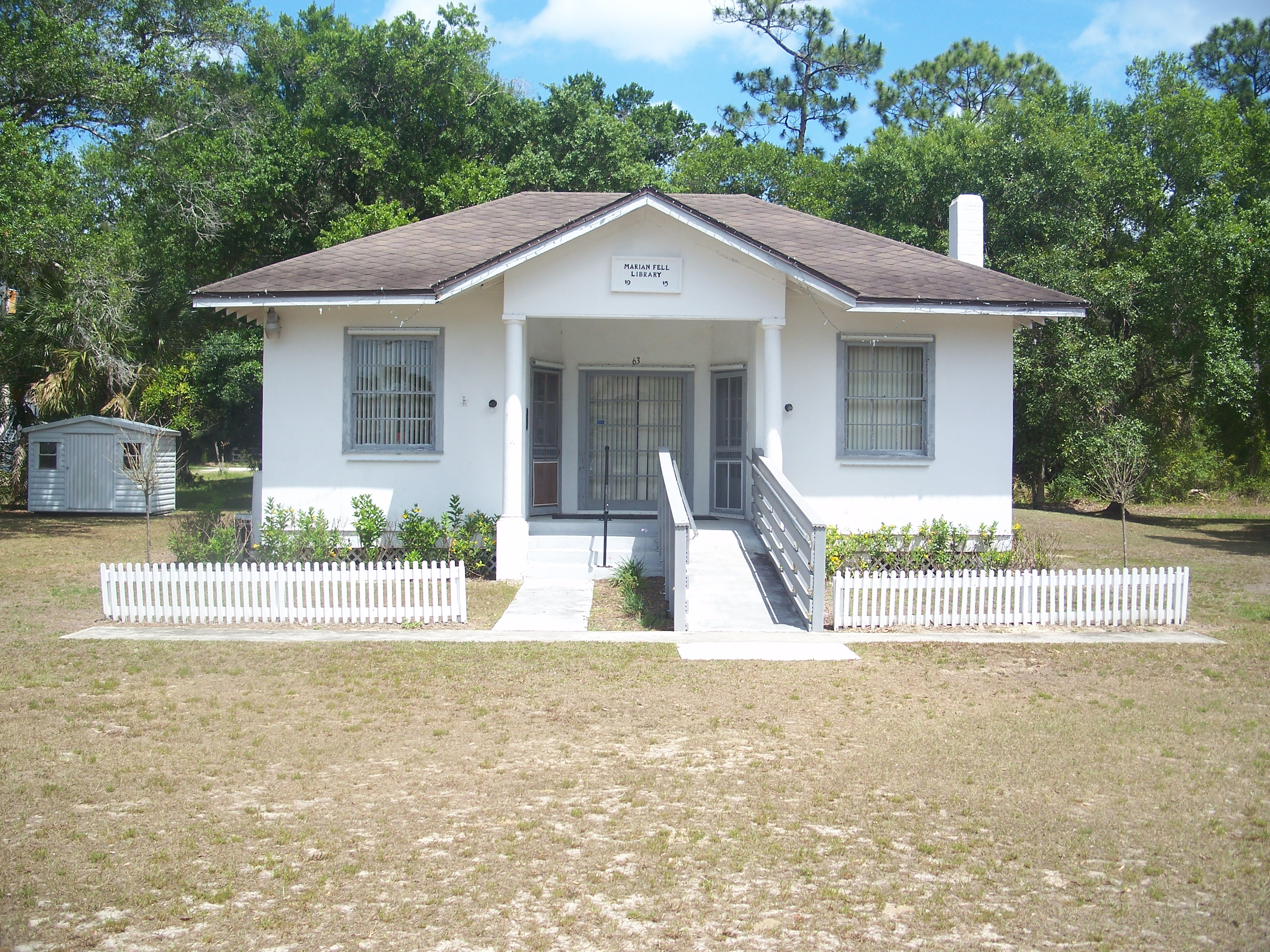

- Location within Florida Location within the United States
- Location: Fellsmere, Florida
- Coordinates: 27°46′15″N 80°36′13″W
- Area: less than one acre
- MPS: Fellsmere MPS
- NRHP reference No.: 96001059
- Added to NRHP: October 8, 1996

The Marian Fell Library is an historic library in Fellsmere, Florida. It is located 63 North Cypress Street. It was added to the National Register of Historic Places in 1996.

The library is named for Marian Fell, who translated the first published English language version of Anton Chekhov's The Seagull in the United States. It was performed at the Bandbox Theatre on Broadway by the Washington Square Players in 1916. The text is part of Project Gutenberg here.
