= Clare Tree Major =

British stage director, playwright and actress

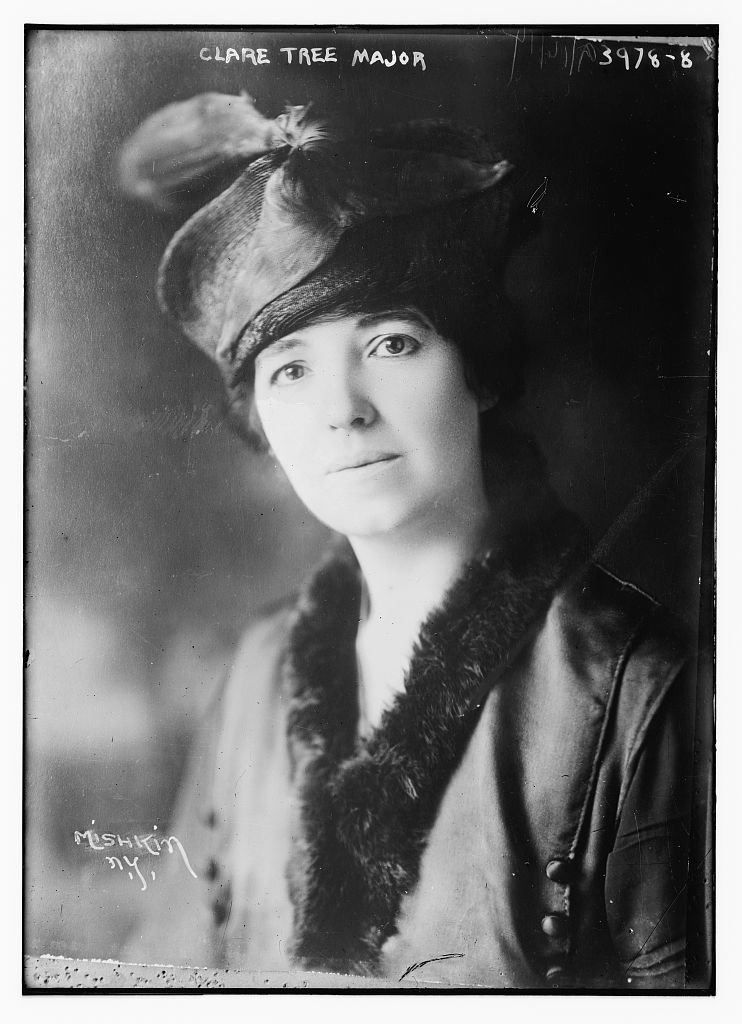
Major circa 1915

Clare Tree Major (1880 – 10 October 1954) was a stage director, playwright, producer of children's theater, and actress. She first acted in London, but in 1914 she came to New York to perform with the Washington Square Players. She was the first British actress to tour America from coast to coast. From the 1920s on she worked exclusively on theater for children, writing plays and sending professional actors on tour to perform them.

== Biography ==
Clare Tree Major was born in 1880 in England. She emigrated to the United States in 1914.

In 1924, she started the Children's Theatre of New York The following year, she produced The Little Poor Man. She founded the Clare Tree Major Theatre Company in 1927 in Pleasantville, New York.

== Personal life ==
Clare Tree Major married publisher John D. Kenderdine; the couple resided in Westchester County, New York.

She died on 10 October 1954 in Manhattan, aged 74.

== Legacy ==
The Clare Tree Major papers, 1912-1954, are held in the New York Public Library.
