= Zella Russell =

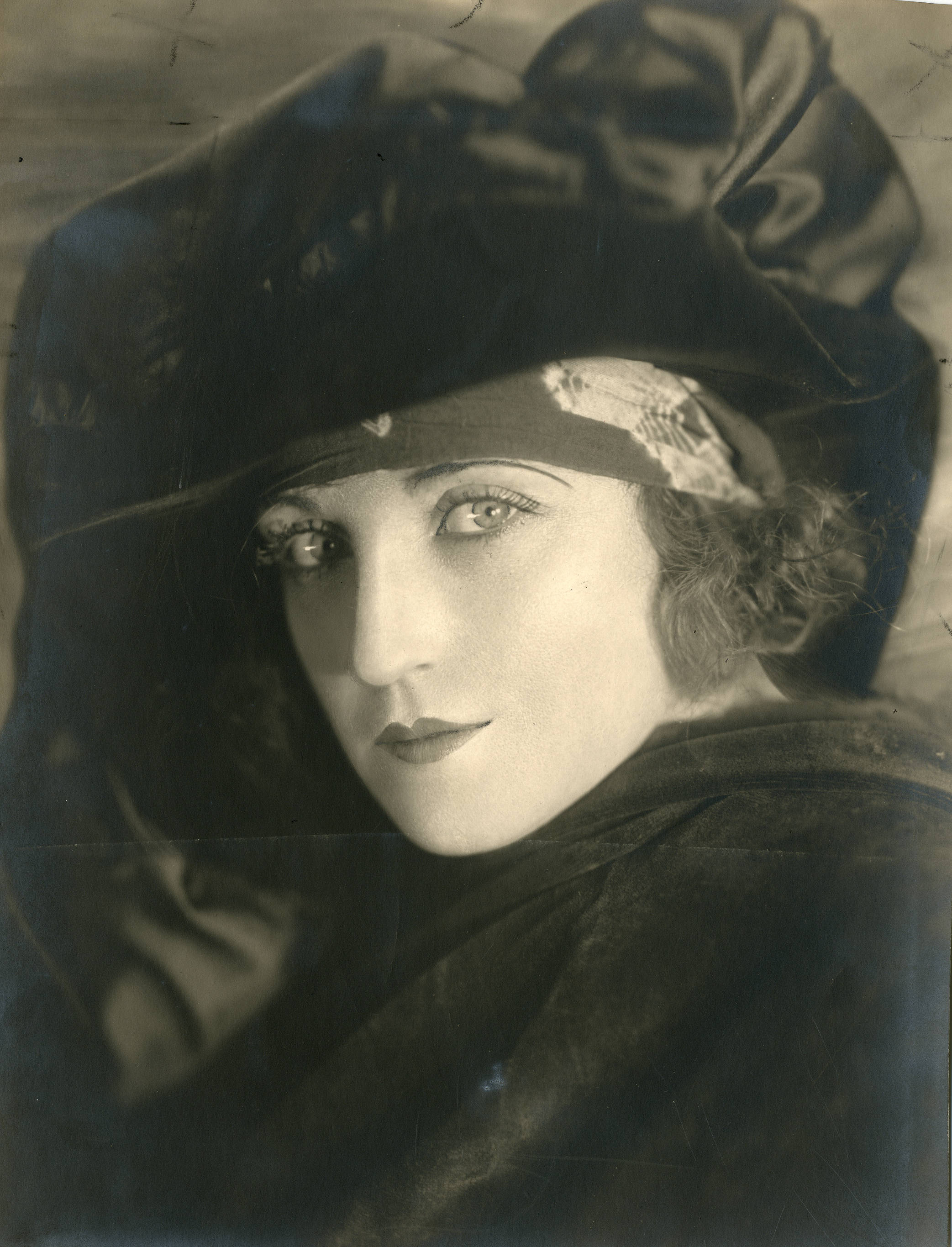
Zella Russell

Rosella O'Connor Russell (October 24, 1883 - February 1, 1952) was a vaudeville star from about 1912 to the late 1940s on the Columbia circuit.

== Biography ==
She was born in the Worcester area of Massachusetts and began her career as a pianist in the silent movie theaters the Palace and the Dreamland in the Boston area. She moved into vaudeville, joining Al Reeves show "Big Burlesque Review" both with a piano act and acting in light comedy routines. Her piano specialty was playing pop tunes of the day in a classical arrangement. Her playing was so popular that it often "stopped" the show, the audience demanding she keep playing. Newspaper profiles of the day credit her with attending the New England Conservatory of Music, but this cannot be confirmed by their records.

She married Harry K. Morton, a fellow vaudevillian. She had one son, Harold Morton, Jr., who died in childhood.

She died on February 1, 1952, in the Somerville, Massachusetts, area. Her husband died in May 1956.

== Broadway productions ==
- Blossom Time, Sep 4, 1943 - Oct 9, 1943, as Mrs. Kranz
- Blossom Time, Dec 26, 1938 - Jan 1939, as Mrs. Kranz
- The Love Song, Jan 13, 1925 - Jun 6, 1925, as Lizette
- Springtime of Youth, Oct 26, 1922 - Dec 23, 1922, as Pepita
- The Sweetheart Shop, Aug 31, 1920 - Oct 16, 1920, as Daphne

== Filmography ==
- Avenging Waters (1936) as "Mrs. Eloise Smythe"
- Taming the Wild (1936) as "Mrs. Elizabeth Bolton"
