= Harry K. Morton (actor) =

American entertainer

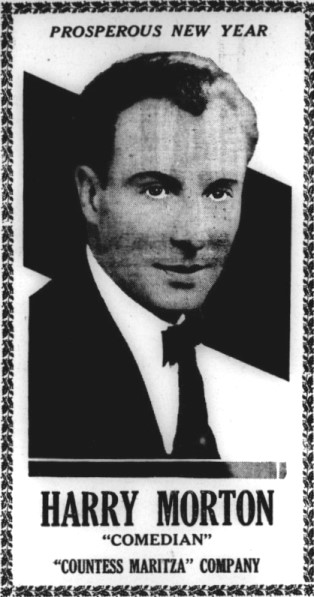
1927 New Year's greeting

Harry K. Morton Jr. (March 20, 1889 – May 9, 1956) was an American actor, comedian, and dancer. He grew up performing in vaudeville and in circuses with his family in an act known as the Four Mortons in which he starred opposite his parents. As an adult he established himself as an actor in musical theatre on Broadway, performing in secondary comic roles and as a dancer and singer. He also continued to perform in vaudeville as an adult and worked as a leading actor in summerstock theatre. He was also an amateur prizefighter in his youth and had a small role in the 1936 film Love Begins at 20.

== Biography ==
He was born on March 20, 1889, in Decatur, Alabama to Harry Kennedy Morton Sr. (died 1919) and Annie Duncan (1853–1902), who were also variety performers. He married Zella Russell.

He appeared in Blossom Time in 1938 and The Street Singer in 1929 as well as Polly in the same year. He appeared in Countess Maritza in 1926.

He died on May 9, 1956, of throat cancer in Roosevelt Hospital in Manhattan.

== Archive ==
His papers are archived at the New York Public Library.

== Performances ==
- The Greenwich Village Follies of 1919 (1919)
- The Sweetheart Shop (1920)
- Love Dreams (1921)
- Springtime of Youth (1922)
- The Love Song (1925)
- Countess Maritza (1926)
- Polly (1929)
- The Street Singer (1929)
- Blossom Time (1938)
