= George P. Oslin =

American journalist

George P. Oslin (1899 — October 24, 1996) was an American reporter, executive at Western Union and author on the history of telecommunication.

Oslin graduated from Mercer University and the Graduate School of Journalism at Columbia University. He was a reporter for the Newark Star-Ledger and the Newark Evening News. As a reporter, he covered the Lindbergh kidnapping and the Hindenburg disaster. He was public relations director for Western Union, where he invented the singing telegram in 1933. At Oslin's suggestion, the first singing telegram was delivered to singer Rudy Vallee on July 28, 1933, for his birthday. Oslin created the singing telegram because he thought "that messages should be fun", but recalled that he "was angrily informed I was making a laughingstock of the company." In his position at Western Union, he gathered the information that led him to write The Story of Telecommunications, (1992, reprinted 1999, ISBN 0-86554-659-2), which included the experiences of Thomas A. Edison, Ezra Cornell and other pioneers and was based on an extensive review of company documents, period newspapers, letters and diaries. He also wrote One Man's Century: From the Deep South to the Top of the Big Apple, (ISBN 0-86554-647-9) a memoir, published in December 1998.
