= The Love Song (operetta) =

Operetta by Edward Künneke, Harry B. Smith and Jacques Offenbach

The Love Song is an operetta in three acts with a libretto by Harry B. Smith that fictionalized the life of composer Jacques Offenbach. The score was arranged by Edward Künneke, who utilized and sometimes pastiched music composed by Offenbach from a variety of his compositions. It also contained original music composed by Künneke. The operetta was adapted from the Hungarian language operetta Offenbach (1920) by composer Mihály Nádor and librettist Jenõ Faragó, and its German language adaptation, Meister von Montmartre (1922), by James Klein and Karl Bretschneider.

The show was commissioned and produced by the Shubert brothers as a follow up to Blossom Time, another biographical operetta, based on the life of Franz Schubert. The production had an unusually large cast with lavish sets designed by Watson Barratt and costumes designed by Ernest Schrapps and Hubert of Paris. Directed by Fred G. Latham, the operetta premiered on Broadway at the Century Theatre on January 13, 1925. It ran there for 157 performances; closing on June 6, 1925. The production starred Allan Prior as Offenbach, Evelyn Herbert as Herminie, Dorothy Francis as Eugenie de Montijo, Odette Myrtil as Hortense, Harry Kennedy Morton as Petipas, and Zella Russell as Lizette.

The New York Times stated that the story's plot was in reality "more fantasy than fact" as it related to Offenbach's actual life, but praised the work as "by all odds the best thing of its kind since The Merry Widow. Don Carle Gillette, reviewing the show in Billboard, found it overblown and humorless, thought the libretto was weak and the music an inconsistent hodgpodge with few opportunities for good choral singing, though he liked some of the performances.

== Musical numbers ==
Music by Offenbach and lyrics by Smith, except as otherwise stated:

Act 1

- "When Your Life Seems a Rainy Day" – Pierre
- "Tell Me Not That You Are Forgetting" – Herminie and Pierre
- "All Aboard for Paris" – Hortense and Petipas
- "Love Is Not for a Day" – Offenbach and girls
- "In Gardens Where Roses Bloom" – Offenbach and Hermini
- "The Hall of Fame Awaits Me" – Hortense and Offenbach
- "Follow the Flag We Love" – Male chorus
- "When the Drum Beat Calls to Glory" – Colonel Bugeaud and soldiers
- "Fair Land of Dreaming" (music by Edward Künneke) – Eugenie de Montijo
- "He Writes a Song" – Offenbach, Eugenie, Herminie and Hortense
- 'Remember Me" (music by Künneke) – Eugenie and Offenbach

Act 2

- "Not for a Year, Not for a Day" – Herminie and Pierre
- "A Farmer's Life" – Petipas
- "When My Violin Is Calling" – Offenbach and girls
- "(I Know It Is) Only a Dream" – Eugenie and Offenbach
- "Military Men I Love" – Hortense and officers
- "Make Up Your Mind" – Hortense and Petipas
- "The Love Song (You Will Forget)" (music by Künneke) – Eugenie and Offenbach

Act 3

- "Violets" – Offenbach and girls
- "March On" – Colonel Bugeaud and members of the Jockey Club
