= Cecil Dorrian =

One of eighteen women accredited as AEF correspondents in WWI

Cecil Inslee Dorrian
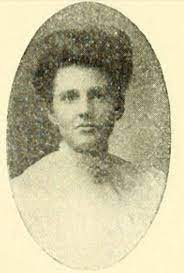
- Born: September 20, 1882; New York, US
- Died: August 18, 1926 (aged 43); Baltimore, Maryland, US

Cecil Inslee Dorrian was one of eighteen women whom the American Expeditionary Forces accredited as visiting war correspondents during World War I. She wrote about the war in France and England for the Newark Evening News, beginning in 1914, and her work often ran on the front page. When Dorrian died, in 1926, a front-page article in the Newark Evening News claimed that she had been “the first accredited American woman war correspondent to reach the battlefront in France in 1918.”

== Early life ==
Dorrian was born September 20, 1882, in Troy, New York, to Joseph and Marie Dorrian. Her father was a secretary to Edward Weston. Dorrian attended Barnard College and graduated in 1905. In the Barnard yearbooks Dorrian participates in activities from dance committee and theater, to basketball, journalism and pingpong. In 1907 she accepted a job with the Ladies' Home Companion. Sometime after this she worked as drama critic for the New York Tribune, also writing other pieces. From 1912 to 1914, Dorrian wrote for the New York Tribune as a theater critic and European representative of the Oscar Morosco Theater Company.

== War correspondent ==
Dorrian began writing for the Newark Evening News as a war correspondent in 1914. She wrote about the war in France and England for the Newark Evening News, beginning in 1914, and her work often ran on the front page. When Dorrian died, in 1926, a front-page article in the Newark Evening News noted that she had been “the first accredited American woman war correspondent to reach the battlefront in France in 1918.” In October 1918, while she and two other women war correspondents were touring a battlefront with the Press Department of the Foreign Office, their guide was killed by a hand grenade. She went to the front lines with the 78th Division sending the News "a firsthand account".

Captain Arthur Hartzell wrote of Dorrian, "Miss..Dorian writes more intelligently about the operations of the Army than any other woman correspondent if one judges her writing from a military viewpoint”. Her articles for the Newark News were often weekly and often on the front page .

== Playwright ==
Dorrian wrote the play "The Age of Reason -- a Divorce Problem Play for Modern Children" . It ran on Broadway from 1915 to 1916 and was published in Vanity Fair in July 1916. It then played around the country with the Los Angeles Times calling it "a brilliant satire on divorce".

== Later work and death ==
Dorrian provided extensive international coverage for the Newark Evening News through the mid-1920s. She died Aug 18, 1926 of pneumonia at a sanitorium near Baltimore, Md. with her mother by her side.
