= Advantage Archives =

Microfilm digitization business based in Cedar Rapids, Iowa

Advantage Archives LLC
- Founded: 2018 (8 years ago)
- Headquarters: Cedar Rapids, Iowa, U.S.
- Key people: Chris Donohue (co-founder and chief financial officer); Jeffrey Kiley (co-founder and chief operating officer)
- Website: https://www.advantagearchives.com/

Advantage Archives LLC is a digital archiving service based in Cedar Rapids, Iowa, United States. Established in 2018, it digitizes microform, newspapers, books and documents. The results are stored in a community history archive, which is freely accessible. The company works with over five hundred libraries and newspaper publishers in the country, using American National Standards Institute to achieve an expected preservation threshold of five hundred years.

The company was co-founded by Chris Donohue and Jeffrey Kiley. Donohue is its chief financial officer and Kiley its chief operating officer.

Its office is at 1025 33rd Avenue SW in Cedar Rapids. The company is a division of Advantage Preservation, itself a division of Advantage Companies. Advantage Companies established a partnership with the State Historical Society of Iowa in 2017 to digitize over twelve million pages of newspapers, the earliest being from the 1830s, around fifteen years prior to statehood.
