= Singing telegram =

Message delivered in song

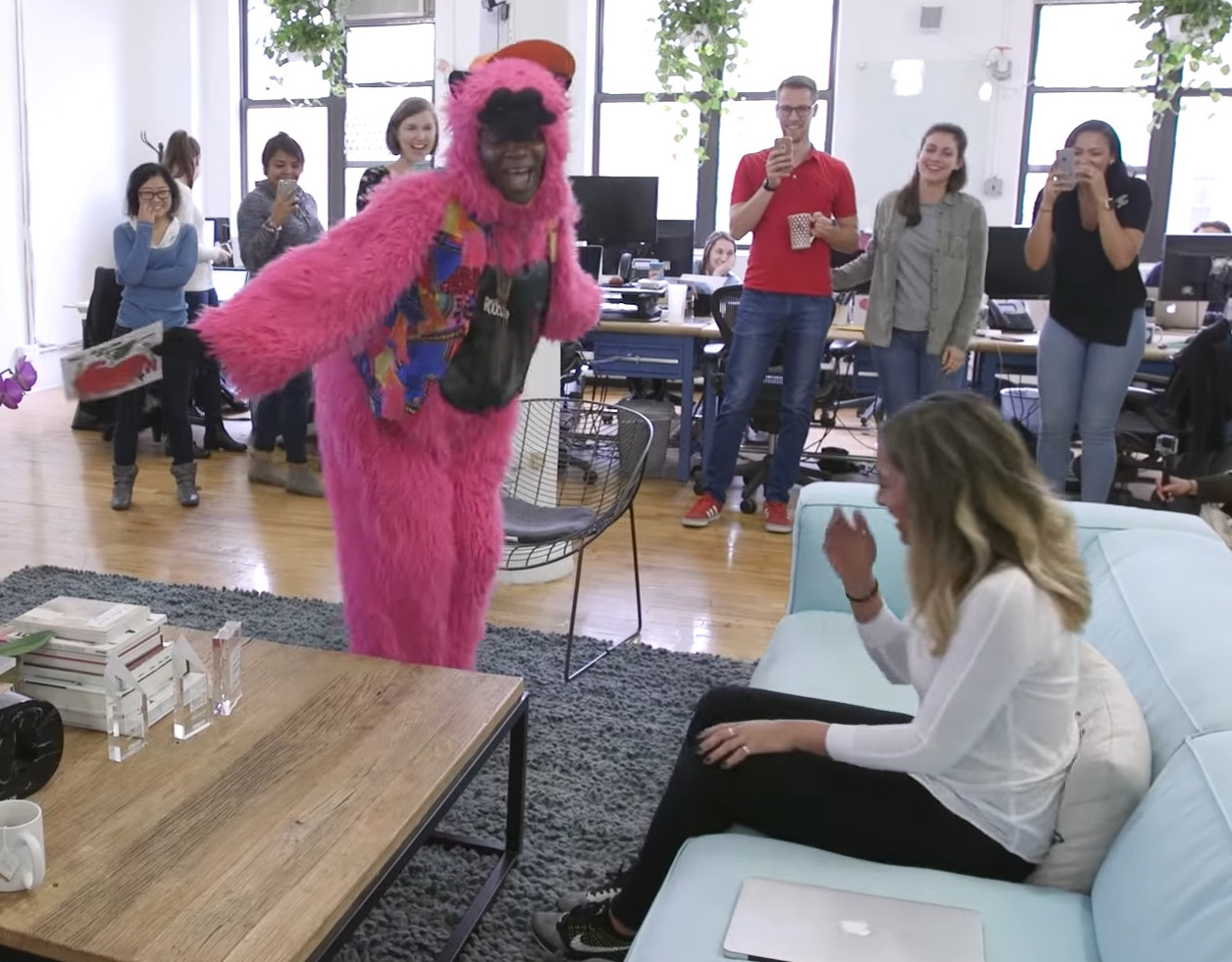
A singing telegram artist delivering a birthday message

A video detailing the day in the life of a singing telegram artist in New York City

A singing telegram is a message delivered by an artist in a musical form. Singing telegrams are historically linked to normal telegrams, but tend to be humorous. Sometimes, the artist is in costume or formal clothing.

Western Union, the American telegraph company, began offering singing telegram services in 1933. That July 28, a fan sent Hollywood singing star Rudy Vallee a birthday greeting by telegram. George P. Oslin (1899–1996), the Western Union public relations director, decided this would be a good opportunity to make telegrams, which had been associated with deaths and other tragic news, into something more popular. He asked a Western Union operator, Lucille Lipps, to sing the message over the telephone, and this became the first singing telegram. While Oslin created the singing telegram because he thought "that messages should be fun," he recalled that he "was angrily informed I was making a laughingstock of the company."

As relatively few telegram recipients had telephones, most telegrams, including singing telegrams, were first delivered in person. The popularization of the telephone in the 1960s reduced telegrams in general. By 1972, Western Union was receiving a small number of requests for singing telegrams and was seeking regulatory approval on a state-by-state basis to eliminate the offering. Western Union suspended its singing telegram service in 1974, but independent singing telegram companies, specializing in often costumed personal delivery of gift messages, have kept up the tradition.

== Variants ==
The linguistic morpheme "-gram" is also found at the end of words in combining forms to give the names of variants on the personally delivered message. These novelty telegrams are generally designed to amuse or embarrass the recipient. The message deliverers are mostly hired through a specialist commercial agency. Examples include the kissogram, strippergram, Gorillagram, etc.

=== Kissogram ===
A kissogram, also called kissagram or kiss-a-gram (short for kissing telegram), is a message delivered along with a kiss, usually arranged as a humorous surprise. The message deliverers are typically young women who are dressed in provocative clothing. Singer Sinéad O'Connor worked as a kissogram at the age of 16, her preferred costume being a nun's habit that was cut away at the back. One of her male co-workers wore a caveman costume. The term "kissogram" was used in the TV program Doctor Who during the early 2010s to describe the profession of The Doctor's companion Amy Pond, who appeared in a sexy kissogram version of a police officer's uniform that included a tight blouse and a very short skirt.

=== Stripogram ===
A stripogram or strippergram is a form of message delivery in which a stripper will perform a striptease while singing or dancing. This type of entertainment became popular in the 1970s in the US and spread to Europe during the 1980s. By the 1990s corporate strip-o-gram work, in which a stripper performs for clients in their workplace, was making up a significant part of the striptease business for novelty telegram services in the US. A strippergram performer often wears a specific outfit for the job, for example a schoolgirl's uniform. Strippergrams are hired for events such as bachelor parties.

=== Bikinigram ===
A bikinigram or bikini-gram is a message delivered by a bikini-clad young woman.
