= George Cronyn =

American writer

George William Cronyn (July 12, 1888 in Anderson, Indiana– May 1969) was a writer in the United States. He was involved with the Works Project Administration's Federal Writers' Project as assistant to the project's founder, Henry Alsberg. He compiled an anthology of Native American poetry. He also wrote books on Communism and Peire Vidal.

== Bibliography ==
- Poems (1914)
- The sandbar queen; a play in one act (1918)
- The path on the rainbow, an anthology of songs and chants from the Indians of North America (1918)
- Death in Fever Flat: a plan (1920)
- Native American Poetry
- The Fool of Venus: The Story of Piere Vidal
- Fortune and Men's Eyes (1935)
- Mermaid Tavern, Kit Marlowe's story (1937)
- A Primer on Communism (1957)
