= Robert Edwards (artist) =

American poet (1879-1948)

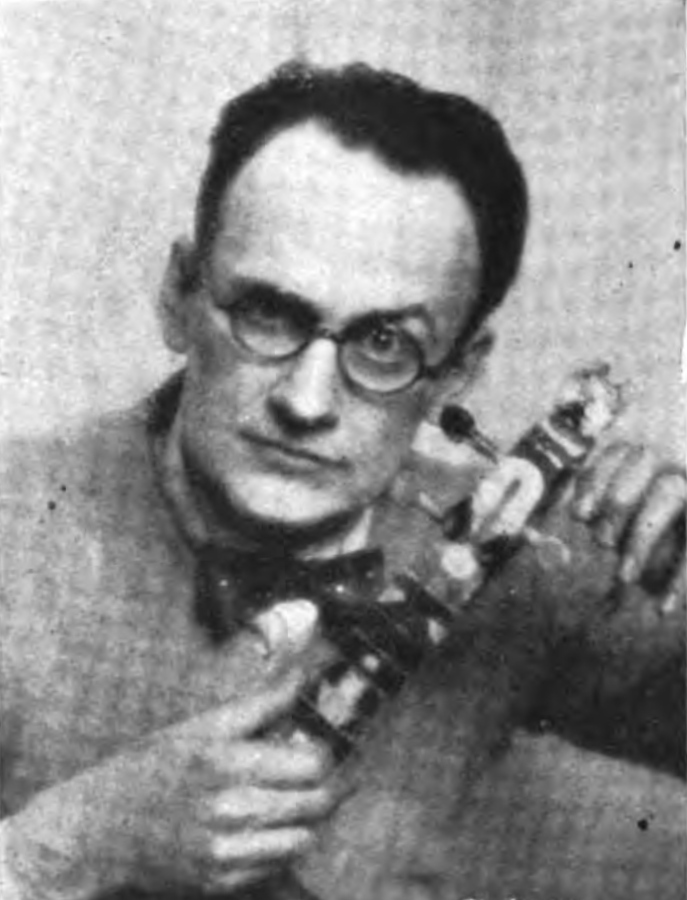
Bobby Edwards

Robert Edwards, also known as Bobby Edwards, (October 4, 1879 – November 2, 1948) was an American artist, musician, and writer, and a prominent figure among New York City's Greenwich Village in the 1920s and '30s. He was editor and publisher of the Greenwich Village Quill, and was known as the "Bard of Bohemia" and the "Village Troubadour" for his many songs he wrote and sang publicly.

Edwards was born in Buffalo, New York in 1879, and in 1901 graduated from Harvard University, where he was editor of the Harvard Lampoon. He studied at the Art Students' League in Buffalo and New York City, the Chase School, and the Eric Pape and Cowles Art Schools in Boston. He became a member of the Society of Illustrators in 1910, and his illustrations appeared in books by Mary Stewart Cutting, Alice MacGowan, and Corra Harris, as well as magazines such as Putnam's Monthly and the Quill, of which he became editor in 1921.

In 1919-1920 he starred in The Greenwich Village Follies first Off-Broadway at the Greenwich Village Theatre, and then on Broadway at the Nora Bayes Theatre.

He died in New York City at the age of 69.
