= William Morris (actor) =

American actor (1861-1936)

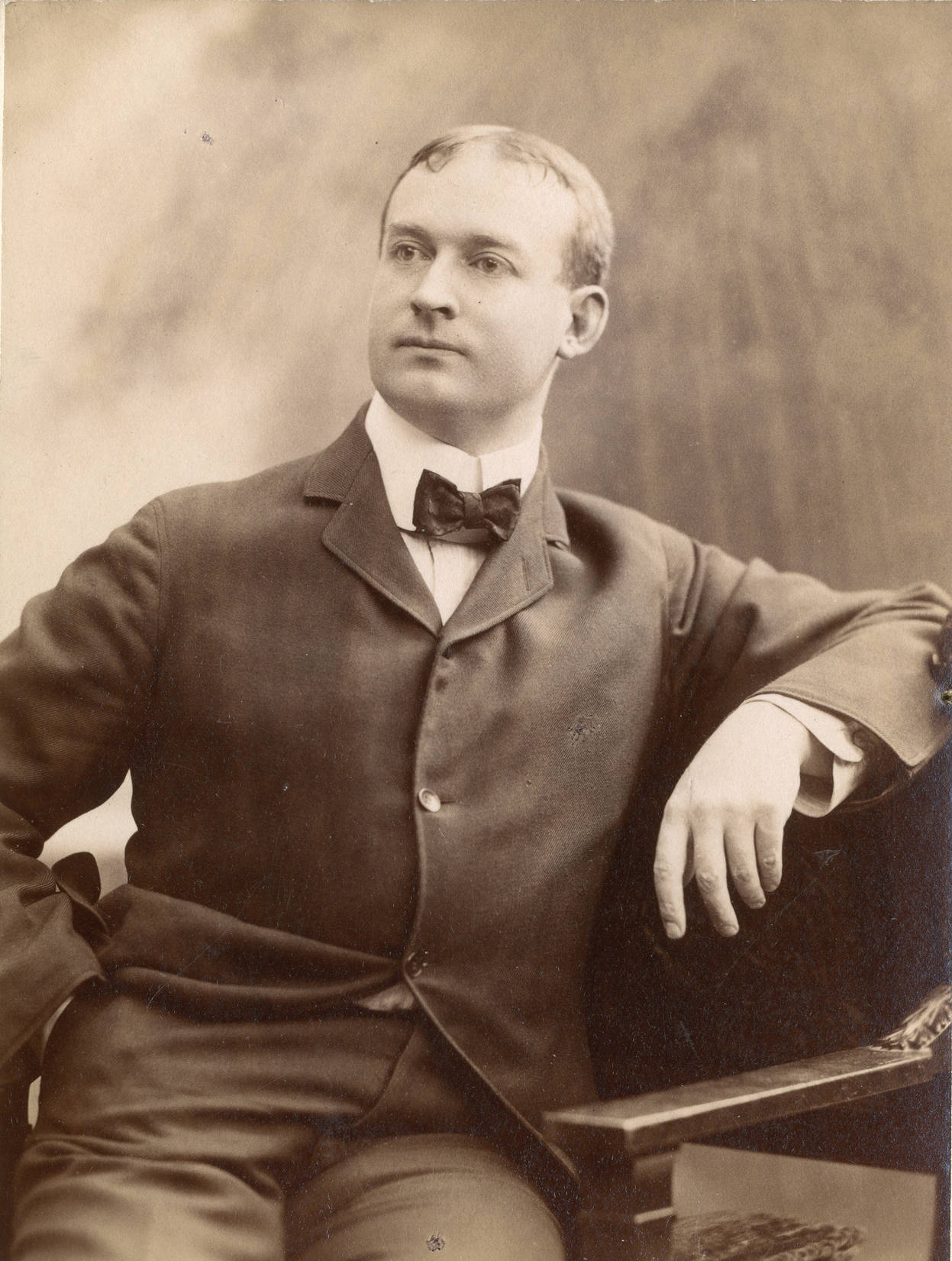
- Morris in 1904
- Born: William Henry Morris; January 1, 1861; Boston, Massachusetts, U.S.
- Died: January 11, 1936 (aged 75); Los Angeles, California, U.S.
- Occupation: Actor
- Years active: 1875–1935
- Spouse: Etta Hawkins
- Children: 5, including Chester Morris

William Henry Morris (January 1, 1861 – January 11, 1936) was an American stage and film actor.

== Career ==
He began his career as a teenager in the theater, first appearing at the Boston Museum in 1875. He became a star on the Broadway stage, where he spent most of his career. He appeared in popular plays such as 1909's Is Matrimony a Failure? He was a character actor in silent films, usually playing gruff fathers or bad guys.

His appearance in Alice Guy's 1917 silent film The Ocean Waif, from Kino DVD, is an example of Morris's surviving screen work.

== Personal life ==
He was married to actress Etta Hawkins, with whom he had five children: screenwriter-actor Gordon Morris (1898–1940), actors Chester Morris (1901–1970) and Adrian Morris (1907–1941), and actress Wilhelmina Morris (1902–1971). Their first child, Lloyd Morris, died young (1892–1902).

== Selected filmography ==
Year	Title	Role	Notes
1916	Romeo and Juliet	Abraham	
1930	Brothers	Dr. Moore	
1930	The Convict's Code	Theodore Perry	
1931	The Woman Between	Frederick Weston	
1931	The Gang Buster	Andrew Martine	

== Selected stage appearances ==
- Men and Women (1890)
- Is Matrimony a Failure? (1909)
- The Concert (1910)
- The Family Cupboard (1913)
- Cheating Cheaters (1916)
