= The Fighting Marines =

- Poster
- Directed by: B. Reeves Eason; Joseph Kane
- Written by: Wallace MacDonald; Maurice Geraghty; Ray Trampe; Sherman L. Lowe; Barney A. Sarecky
- Produced by: Nat Levine; Barney A. Sarecky
- Starring: Grant Withers; Adrian Morris; Ann Rutherford; Robert Warwick; George J. Lewis; Patrick H. O'Malley, Jr.
- Cinematography: Jack A. Marta; William Nobles
- Edited by: Richard Fantl
- Music by: Lee Zahler; J.S. Zamecnik
- Distributed by: Mascot Pictures
- Release date: November 23, 1935 (U.S.)
- Running time: 12 chapters (216 minutes)
- Country: United States
- Language: English

The Fighting Marines is a 1935 American movie serial. It was the last serial produced by Mascot Pictures before the studio was bought out and merged with others to become Republic Pictures. This new company went on to become the most famous of the serial producing studios, starting with Darkest Africa in 1936.

Future Republic producer Franklin Adreon first became involved with serials with this production. The former regular Marine, then a Marine Corps Reserve officer, was a technical consultant and played the small role of Captain Holmes in the later chapters.

== Plot ==
The Fighting Marines follows the United States Marine Corps' efforts to construct a landing strip on Halfway Island in the Pacific Ocean. The island becomes the target of sabotage by a mysterious masked villain known only as The Tiger Shark, who seeks to protect his hidden base located on the island. Using an array of sabotage techniques and attacks, The Tiger Shark attempts to halt the Marines’ construction efforts.

Corporal Larry Grant and Sergeant 'Mac' McGowan, two brave Marines, take the lead in combating The Tiger Shark's schemes. Despite their rivalry over the affection of Frances Schiller, they work together to counter the villain's attacks. Frances' brother, Sergeant William Schiller, develops a gyrocompass, a critical device capable of pinpointing The Tiger Shark's location. When Sergeant Schiller is kidnapped by The Tiger Shark's henchmen, Grant and McGowan must race against time to rescue him and secure the gyrocompass.

Throughout 12 thrilling chapters, the Marines face various challenges, including traps, aerial attacks, and close-quarter combat with The Tiger Shark's operatives. Each chapter builds on escalating stakes as the Marines strive to prevent the villain from disrupting their mission and uncover his true identity.

In the final confrontation, The Tiger Shark is unmasked and defeated, ensuring the Marines can complete their airstrip and maintain control over Halfway Island. With the villain vanquished and peace restored, the Marines celebrate their hard-earned victory.

The Fighting Marines, Chapter 1: Human Targets

== Cast ==
- Grant Withers as Corporal Larry Lawrence, US Marine
- Adrian Morris as Sergeant Mack McGowan, US Marine
- Ann Rutherford as Frances Schiller
- Robert Warwick as Colonel W. R. Bennett, US Marine
- George J. Lewis as Sergeant William Schiller, US Marine abducted by the Tiger Shark
- Patrick H. O'Malley, Jr. as Captain Grayson
- Victor Potel as Fake Native Chief, one of the Tiger Shark's henchmen
- Jason Robards Sr. as Kota
- Warner Richmond as Metcalf, one of the Tiger Shark's henchmen
- Robert Frazer as H. R. Douglas
- J. Frank Glendon as M. J. Buchanan
- Donald Reed as Pedro, one of the Tiger Shark's henchmen
- Max Wagner as Gibson, one of the Tiger Shark's henchmen
- Richard Alexander as Ivan, one of the Tiger Shark's henchmen
- Tom London as Miller, one of the Tiger Shark's henchmen

== Production ==
=== Stunts ===
- Yakima Canutt
- George DeNormand doubling Grant Withers
- Eddie Parker doubling Adrian Morris

=== Special effects ===
- Photographic effects by Bud Thackery
- Model effects by the Lydecker brothers

=== Soundtrack ===
- Semper Fidelis by John Philip Sousa

== Chapter titles ==
1. Human Targets
2. Isle of Missing Men
3. The Savage Horde
4. The Mark of the Tiger Shark
5. The Gauntlet of Grief
6. Robber's Roost
7. Jungle Terrors
8. Siege of Halfway Island
9. Death from the Sky
10. Wheels of Destruction
11. Behind the Mask
12. Two Against the Horde

_{Source:}

== See also ==
- List of film serials
- List of film serials by studio

| Preceded by The Adventures of Rex and Rinty (1935) | Mascot serial The Fighting Marines (1935) | Succeeded by none |
