= One Frightened Night =

1935 film by Christy Cabanne

- Directed by: Christy Cabanne
- Written by: Stuart Palmer (story); Wellyn Totman (screenplay)
- Produced by: Nat Levine (producer); George Yohalem (supervising producer)
- Starring: Charley Grapewin; Lucien Littlefield; Mary Carlisle
- Cinematography: Ernest Miller; William Nobles
- Edited by: Ray Curtiss
- Distributed by: Mascot Pictures
- Release date: May 1, 1935
- Running time: 66 minutes
- Country: United States
- Language: English

One Frightened Night is a 1935 American comedy mystery film directed by Christy Cabanne and starring Charley Grapewin, Lucien Littlefield and Mary Carlisle. The film has entered the public domain.

== Plot ==
Faced with an upcoming inheritance tax, multimillionaire Jasper Whyte summons a group of people to his mansion to announce that he is leaving each of them one million dollars. This changes when he discovers a long lost granddaughter Doris Waverly who comes to his mansion; Jasper decides to leave his total fortune to her. Another Doris Waverly comes to the mansion and a murder is committed.

== Cast ==
- Charley Grapewin as Jasper Whyte
- Lucien Littlefield as Dr. Denham
- Mary Carlisle as The Second Doris Waverly
- Regis Toomey as Tom Dean
- Arthur Hohl as Arthur Proctor
- Fred Kelsey as Sheriff Jenks
- Evalyn Knapp as The Fake Doris Waverly
- Clarence Wilson as Mr. Felix
- Wallace Ford as Joe Luvalle
- Adrian Morris as Deputy Abner
- Hedda Hopper as Laura Proctor
- Rafaela Ottiano as Elvira - the Maid

== Critical reception ==
Variety gave a lukewarm review, writing that a "mixture of laughs and mystery thrills" make the film "acceptable", but offered praise to Charley Grapewin for a "splendid job" and to Wallace Ford who was described as "an outstander."
