= The Gay Bride =

1934 film by Jack Conway

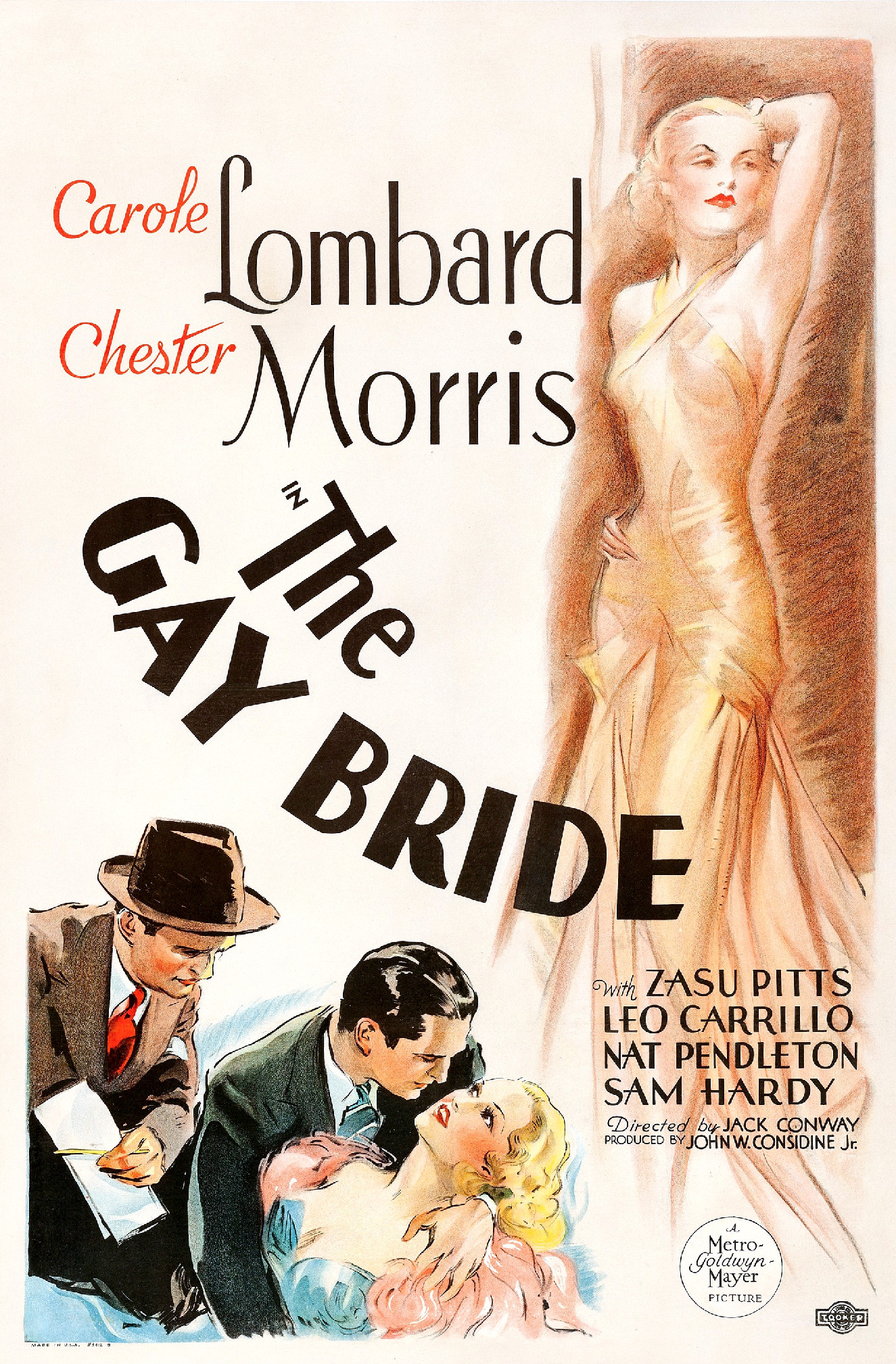
- Theatrical release poster
- Directed by: Jack Conway
- Written by: Bella Spewak; Sam Spewak
- Based on: "Repeal"; 1934 novel in 1933-34 The Saturday Evening Post by Charles Francis Coe
- Produced by: John W. Considine Jr.
- Starring: Carole Lombard; Chester Morris
- Cinematography: Ray June
- Edited by: Frank Sullivan
- Music by: Jack Virgil; R.H. Bassett (uncredited)
- Production company: Metro-Goldwyn-Mayer
- Distributed by: Loew's, Inc.
- Release date: December 14, 1934
- Running time: 80 minutes
- Country: United States
- Language: English

The Gay Bride is a 1934 American crime-screwball comedy film directed by Jack Conway and starring Carole Lombard as a wisecracking gold-digger and Chester Morris as the poor man she despises. It was written by the husband-and-wife team of Sam and Bella Spewak, based on the story "Repeal" by Charles Francis Coe.

== Plot ==
Gold-digging chorus girl Mary marries the head of a bootlegging syndicate, gangster "Shoots" Magiz, but his illegal liquor business goes down the drain when Prohibition is repealed, and Shoots is knocked off by rival Daniel Dingle.

Mary, looking for a new sugar daddy, hooks up with Dingle, and when Dingle is removed from the scene by Mickey "The Greek" Mikapopoulis, transfers her attention to him in return for a "trust fund."

All the time, Jimmy "Office Boy" Burnham, Shoots' former bodyguard and errand boy, has looked after Mary, passing her advice and remarks whenever needed. In the end, Mary and Office Boy end up together but only after "Merry Widow Mary" gives away all the money she was given.

== Cast ==
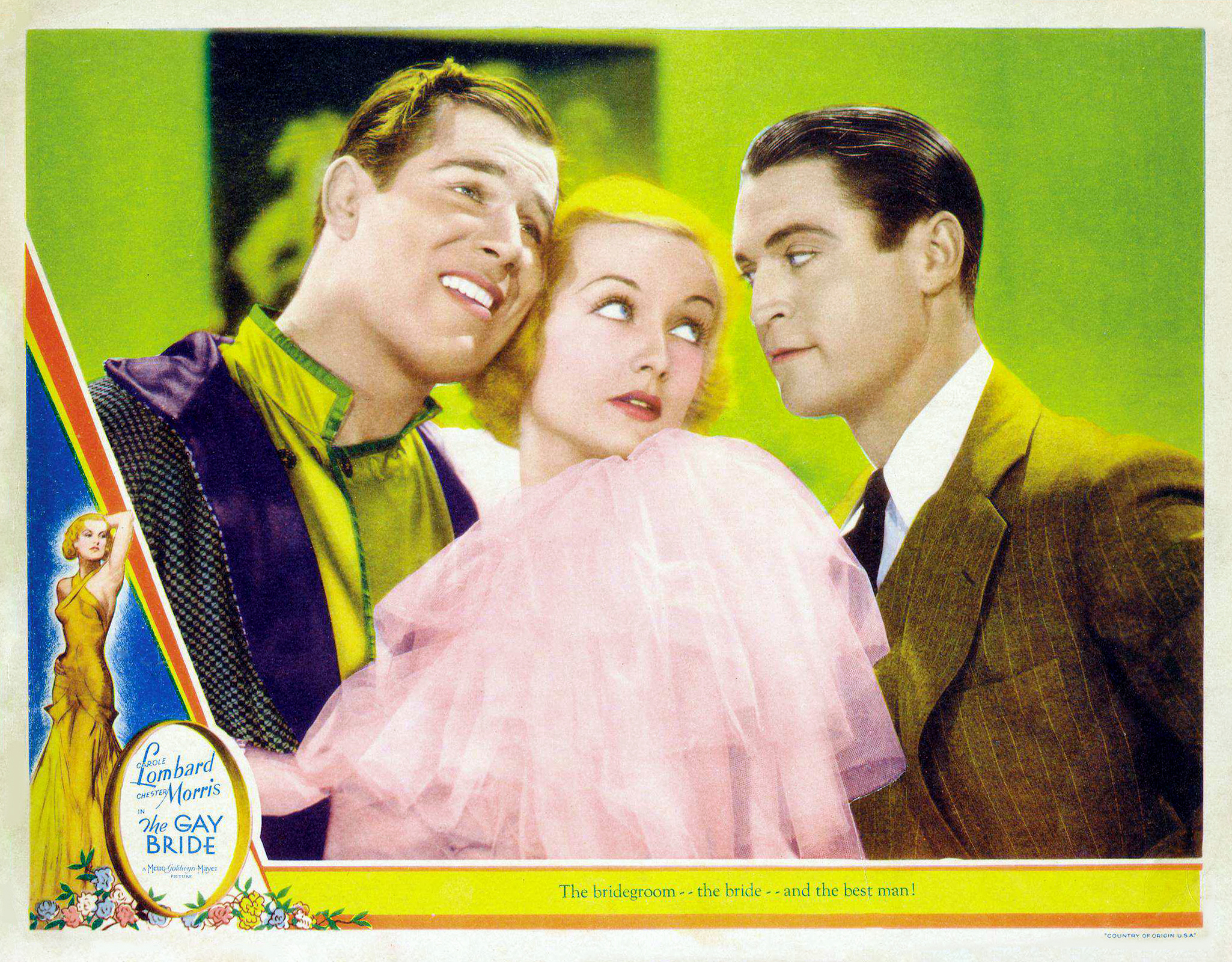
Lobby card for The Gay Bride featuring (from left) Nat Pendleton, Carole Lombard and Chester Morris

- Carole Lombard as Mary Magiz
- Chester Morris as Jimmy "Office Boy" Burnham
- ZaSu Pitts as Mirabelle
- Leo Carrillo as Mickey "The Greek" Mikapopoulis
- Nat Pendleton as William T. "Shoots" Magiz
- Walter Walker as MacPherson, the lawyer

Cast notes

- Eddie "Rochester" Anderson has a small uncredited part as a bootblack.
- Gene Lockhart also has a small part as a crooked politician, Jim Smiley.

== Production ==
The Gay Bride began shooting on 20 September 1934 and finished on 23 October. It used the working title of "Repeal", which was the title of the short story by Charles Francis Coe it was based on, which had been published in the Saturday Evening Post at the end of 1933. The title refers to the repeal of Prohibition, which ruined the business of the bootlegger played by Nat Pendelton.

When casting the film, Jean Harlow was considered for the female lead, and Clark Gable, Lyle Talbot, Ricardo Cortez, Russell Hardie and Richard Arlen for the male lead. For the role played by ZaSu Pitts, Una Merkel and Isabel Jewell were considered. MGM borrowed Lombard from Paramount Pictures for the film, the only one she was to make for the studio despite her non-exclusive contract with Paramount that allowed her to work wherever she wanted in Hollywood.

== Reception ==
The film was released in the United States on 14 December 1934, and did not earn praise from the critics nor was it successful at the box office. Variety wrote that

Gangster pictures are gone, and this one won’t do anything to bring them back. It’ll do more to consign them permanently to Davey Jones’ locker down where [box office] grosses don’t count. It deals with hoodlums in a post-prohibition era, but fails to freshen up the story and the conventional means taken to carry it out.

Photoplay wrote that the film was "A good story loaded with plot complications and blurry character drawings. Even ZaSu Pitts seems more bewildered than usual." Lombard considered the picture one of her worst, and co-star Chester Morris was aware that the film was a "turkey" while they were filming it.
