= The Pagan Lady =

1931 film

- Film poster
- Directed by: John Francis Dillon
- Written by: William DuBois; Benjamin Glazer
- Starring: Evelyn Brent
- Cinematography: Norbert Brodine
- Edited by: Viola Lawrence
- Distributed by: Columbia Pictures
- Release date: September 8, 1931
- Running time: 70 minutes
- Country: United States
- Language: English

The Pagan Lady is a 1931 American pre-Code drama film directed by John Francis Dillon and starring Evelyn Brent. It is based on the Broadway play Pagan Lady (1930) written by William DuBois.

== Cast ==
- Evelyn Brent as Dorothy 'Dot' Hunter
- Conrad Nagel as Ernest Todd
- Charles Bickford as Dingo Mike
- Roland Young as Dr. Heath
- William Farnum as Malcolm 'Mal' Todd
- Lucile Gleason as Nellie (as Lucille Gleason)
- Leslie Fenton as Gerald 'Gerry' Willis
- Gwen Lee as Gwen Willis
- Wallace MacDonald as Francisco
- Adrian Morris as Snooper the Henchman
