= Etta Hawkins =

American actress

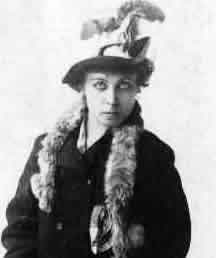
Etta Hawkins

Henrietta Luna Hawkins (August 21, 1865 – July 13, 1945), known as Etta Hawkins, was an American comedic stage actress during the early 1900s. She gained prestige with her work in the productions of Lord Chumley with E.H. Sothern: The Charity Ball and The Lost Paradise.

She was born in Aurora, Illinois, daughter of Anna Gutherz (a native of Switzerland) and William Delos Hawkins. In 1891, she married stage actor and producer William Morris.

She was the mother of actors Chester, Adrian, and Gordon Morris, and also had a daughter, Mrs. H. O. Russell of New York. She died at her son Chester's Beverly Hills home in 1945, aged 79.
