= The Big House (1930 film) =

1930 film directed by George W. Hill

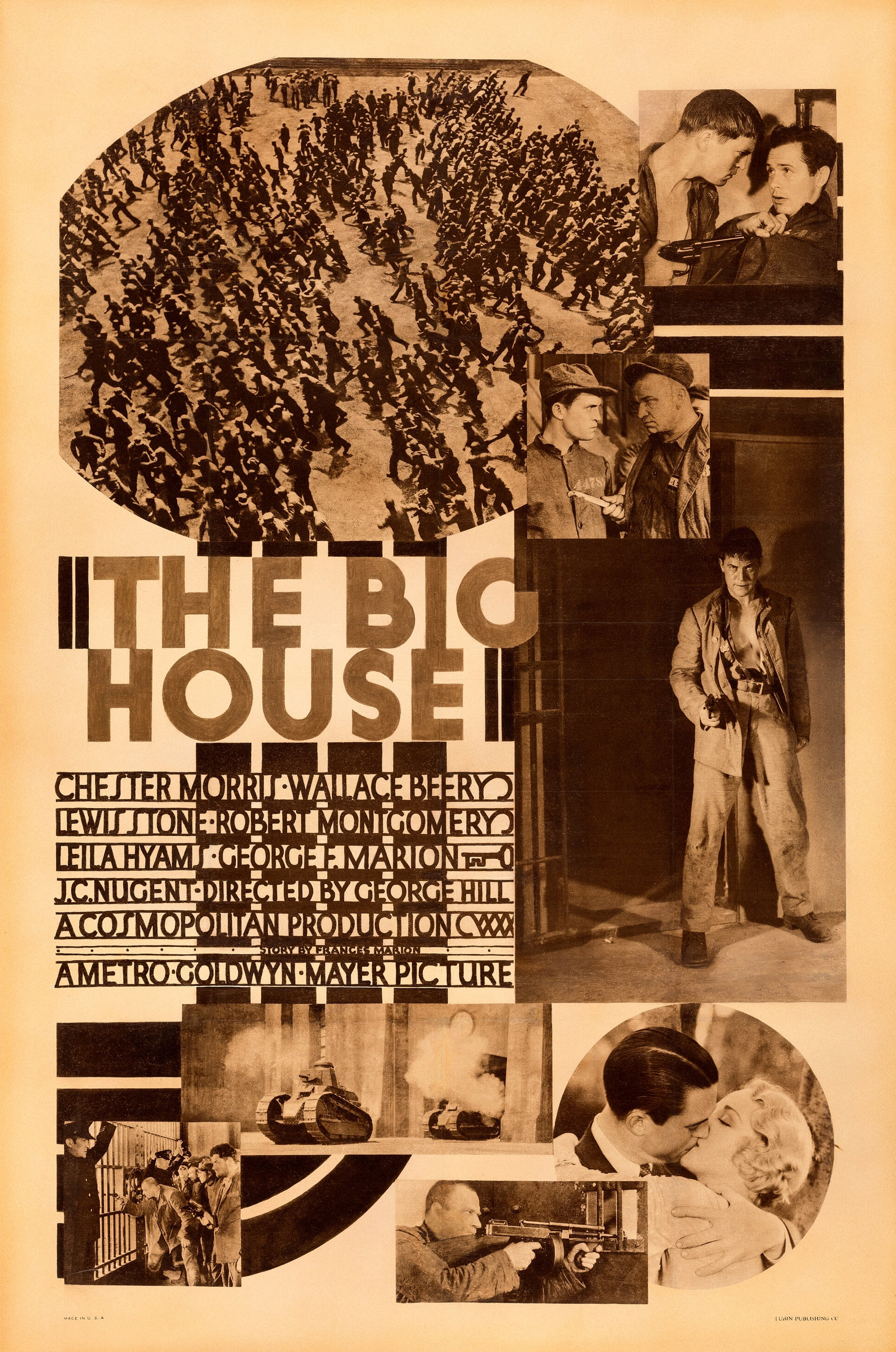
- Rotogravure One Sheet
- Directed by: George Hill
- Screenplay by: Story and dialogue by Frances Marion; Additional dialogue by Joe Farnham and Martin Flavin
- Produced by: Irving Thalberg (uncredited)
- Starring: Chester Morris; Wallace Beery; Lewis Stone; Robert Montgomery; Leila Hyams; George F. Marion; J. C. Nugent
- Cinematography: Harold Wenstrom
- Edited by: Blanche Sewell
- Music by: Louis Silvers
- Production company: Cosmopolitan Productions
- Distributed by: Metro-Goldwyn-Mayer
- Release date: June 24, 1930
- Running time: 87 minutes
- Country: United States
- Language: English
- Budget: $414,000
- Box office: $1,715,000 (worldwide rentals)

The Big House is a 1930 American pre-Code prison drama film directed by George Hill, released by Metro-Goldwyn-Mayer, and starring Chester Morris, Wallace Beery, Lewis Stone and Robert Montgomery. The story and dialogue were written by Frances Marion, who won the Academy Award for Best Writing Achievement. As one of the first prison movies, it inspired many others of this genre.

== Plot ==
The Big House (1930)

Kent (Robert Montgomery), a drunk driver who carelessly kills a man, is sentenced to ten years for manslaughter. In an overcrowded prison designed for 1800 and actually holding 3000, he is placed in a cell with Butch (Wallace Beery) and Morgan (Chester Morris), the two leaders of the inmates. Butch is alternately menacing and friendly, while Morgan tries to help out the frightened, inexperienced youngster, but Kent rebuffs his overtures.

When Butch is ordered into solitary confinement for sparking a protest over the prison food, he passes along his knife before being searched. It ends up in Kent's hands. Meanwhile, Morgan is notified that he is to be paroled. Prior to a search of their cell, Kent hides the knife in Morgan's bed. When it is found, Morgan's parole is canceled, and he is put in solitary as well. He vows to make Kent pay for what he has done.

When Morgan is let out of solitary, he escapes by switching places with a corpse on the way to the morgue. He makes his way to the bookstore run by Kent's beautiful sister, Anne (Leila Hyams). She, however, recognizes him. She manages to get his gun and starts to call the police, but then changes her mind and gives him back his pistol. Morgan (who has been attracted to Anne since he saw Kent's photograph of her) gets a job and becomes better acquainted with Anne and her family. They all like him, especially Anne. However he is caught and sent back to prison.

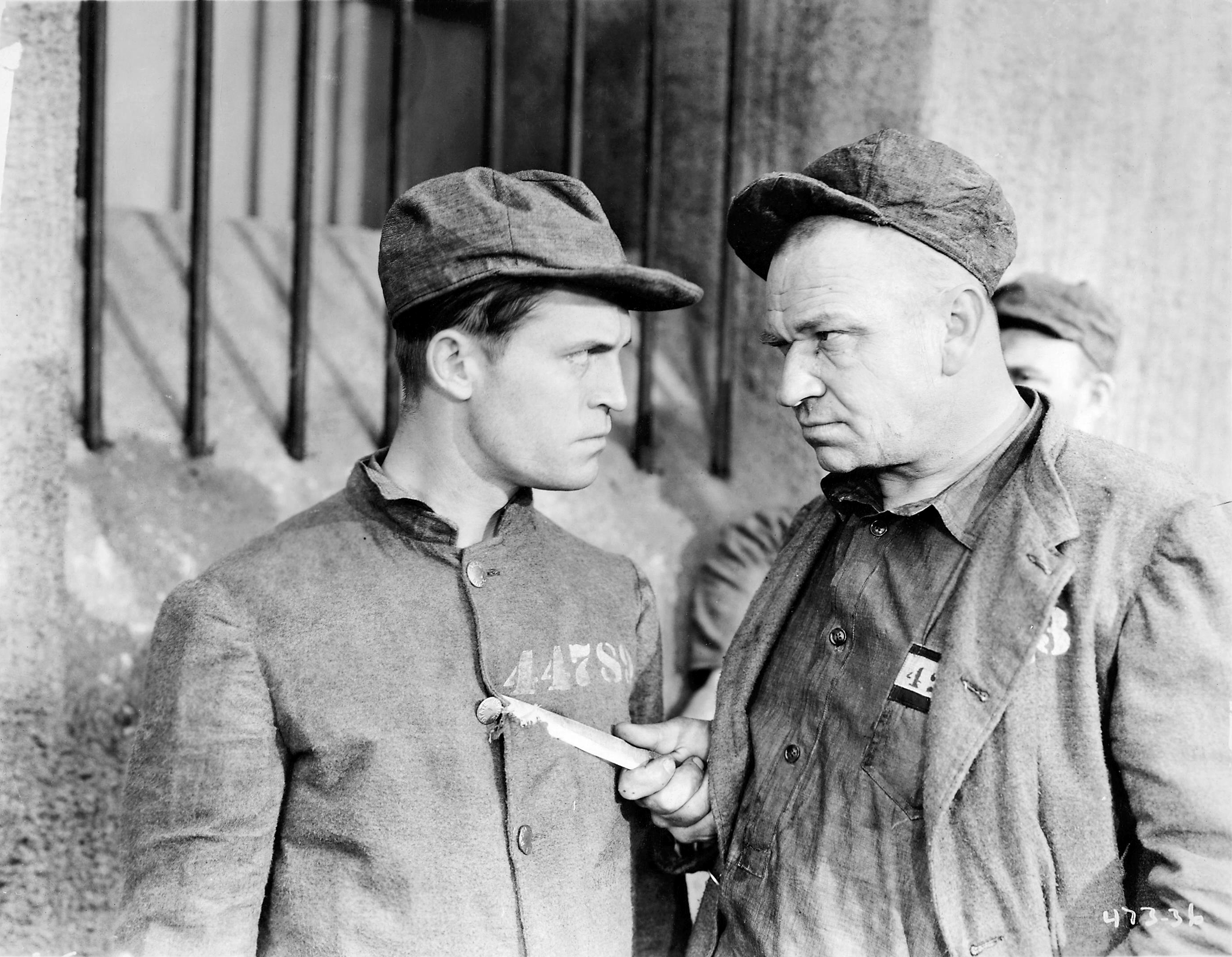
Chester Morris and Wallace Beery in The Big House

When Butch tells Morgan of his plan for a jailbreak on Thanksgiving, Morgan tells him that he is going straight. In return for a promise of freedom, Kent informs the warden (Lewis Stone) of the attempt, though he is not privy to the details. Despite the warning, the inmates succeed in taking over the prison, capturing many of the guards, though they are unable to force their way out. Thwarted, Butch threatens to shoot the guards one by one unless they are allowed to escape. When the warden stands firm, Butch shoots the warden's right-hand man in cold blood, then tosses the dying man out for all to see.

Army tanks are called to break down the entrance. Morgan grabs a pistol from the prisoner assigned to watch the guards. He finds Kent cowering with the guard but spares him. Kent panics and flees before Morgan locks the guards in to save their lives. When Kent tries to open the front doors, he is killed in the crossfire. Butch is told that Morgan was the "stoolie" who tipped off the warden and learns he has put the guards out of danger. He sets out to kill his former friend. In the ensuing gunfight, both are wounded, Butch fatally. Before he dies, he learns that Kent was actually the informer, and he and Morgan reconcile. For his efforts, Morgan is given a full pardon. When he exits the prison, Anne rushes to embrace him.

== Cast ==
- Chester Morris as Morgan
- Wallace Beery as Butch
- Lewis Stone as Warden
- Robert Montgomery as Kent
- Leila Hyams as Anne
- George F. Marion as Pop
- J. C. Nugent as Mr. Marlowe
- Karl Dane as Olsen
- DeWitt Jennings as Wallace
- Mathew Betz as Gopher
- Claire McDowell as Mrs. Marlowe
- Robert O'Connor as Donlin
- Tom Kennedy as Uncle Jed
- Tom Wilson as Sandy
- Eddie Foyer as Dopey
- Rosco Ates as Putnam
- Fletcher Norton as Oliver

Uncredited (in order of appearance)

- Louis Natheaux......Morgan's lawyer
- George Magrill......Convict in yard
- Angelo Rossitto......Convict
- Michael Vavitch......Convict
- Harry Wilson......Convict number #46375
- Ethan Laidlaw......Trustee
- Chris-Pin Martin......Convict
- Edgar Dearing......Convict
- Herbert Prior......Prison doctor

== Background ==
The story was inspired by a spate of prison riots in 1929 and resulting federal investigation. In response, George Hill wrote a twenty-seven page story treatment called "The Reign of Terror: A Story of Crime and Punishment". Irving Thalberg gave the go ahead for the screenplay and assigned Frances Marion to work with George Hill.

Lon Chaney was originally chosen for the role of Butch, a violent career criminal who rules the prison cellblock, but the cancer from which he was to die in August 1930 had already advanced too far and the role went to Wallace Beery. The movie launched Beery's sound career to new heights; a top supporting actor and frequent leading man in silents, he had been dropped by his previous studio Paramount when sound came in even though he recorded a successful voice test. After The Big House became a hit and his performance earned him an Academy Award nomination for Best Actor in a Leading Role, he became the world's highest-paid actor within two years.

The story and dialogue were written by Frances Marion, with additional dialogue by Joe Farnham and Martin Flavin. Marion won the Academy Award for Best Writing Achievement. Douglas Shearer also won the first Academy Award for Sound. The film was nominated for Best Picture. The Big House was one of the first prison films ever made and was tremendously influential on the genre.

== Foreign-language versions ==
El presidio, the Spanish-language version of the film

In the early days of sound films, it was common for Hollywood studios to produce "Foreign Language Versions" of their films using the same sets, costumes and so on. While many of these versions no longer exist, the French, Spanish and German-language versions of The Big House survive, which are entitled Révolte dans la prison, El presidio and Menschen hinter Gittern. The French and Spanish versions are available with the original in a triple feature set from the Warner Archives.

== Reception ==
Mordaunt Hall of The New York Times described it as "a film in which the direction, the photography, the microphone work and the magnificent acting take precedence over the negligible story."

Variety called it a "virile, realistic melodrama". John Mosher of The New Yorker wrote, "So expert are many of the scenes, so effective the photography, so direct and spare the dialogue, that certain obvious, silly, and dull moments may almost be overlooked."

Wallace Beery was nominated for an Academy Award for Best Actor for his role in The Big House, cementing his career in sound films, and won the following year for The Champ (1931).

According to MGM records The Big House took in approximately $1,279,000 in theater rentals from the United States and Canada, an additional $436,000 from foreign rentals, and earned a profit of $462,000.

The February 2020 issue of New York Magazine lists The Big House as among "The Best Movies That Lost Best Picture at the Oscars."

== Evaluation in film guides ==
Steven H. Scheuer's TV Movie Almanac & Ratings 1958 & 1959 gave The Big House a "Good" rating of 3 stars (out of 4), summarizing its plot as "[D]esperate convicts try a prison break", with the evaluation, "[T]his early example of prison melodrama is still entertaining". Leonard Maltin's TV Movies & Video Guide (1989 edition) also put the rating at 3 (out of 4 stars), describing it as "[T]he original prison drama" and indicating that "this set the pattern for all later copies; it's still good, hard-bitten stuff with one of Beery's best tough-guy roles". In the third edition (2015) of his Classic Movie Guide, Maltin also mentioned the surviving French and Spanish-language versions and added that "Charles Boyer stars in the former".

British references had some positive words for the film, with the 1984 edition of David Shipman's The Good Film and Video Guide giving 1 star out of 4 ("Recommended with reservations"), noting that it is "[An] untypical MGM film, about prison life which is now laughably conventional but was then very influential". Shipman describes Wallace Beery and Chester Morris as "two old lags" and Robert Montgomery as "the wealthy guy too weak for the system". Leslie Halliwell in the 5th edition (1985) of his Film and Video Guide, rated it 2 stars out of 4 and described it as an "[A]rchetypal prison melodrama and a significant advance in form for early talkies."
