= The Arena (Studio One) =

- Studio One episode
- Episode no.: Season 8 Episode 30
- Directed by: Franklin Schaffner
- Written by: Rod Serling
- Original air date: April 9, 1956

Guest appearances
- Wendell Corey as Sen. James Norton; Chester Morris as Jack Feeney; John Cromwell as Sen. Harvey Rogers

"The Arena" is an American television play broadcast live on April 9, 1956, as part of the CBS television series, Studio One. Written by Rod Serling and directed by Franklin Schaffner, the story concerns a young U.S. Senator who seeks to avenge his father's political downfall by destroying his father's rival. He threatens to reveal the rival's membership 25 years earlier in "The Vindicators", an organization that the government has now classified as subversive.

== Plot ==
=== Act I ===
James Norton arrives in Washington, D.C. as a freshman senator. He is taking over his father's seat after being appointed by the governor. Jack Feeney, an experienced Washington hand, is Norton's aide. Senator Rogers is the senior senator from Norton's state. Norton blames Rogers for his father's political downfall. In his first press conference, Norton is asked about Rogers' having said that Norton's father was the worst member of the Senate. Norton loses his cool, and a newspaper reports on the front page that Norton has called Rogers "big mouthed".

=== Act II ===
Norton and Rogers debate on the Senate floor. Rogers accuses Norton's father of inserting illegitimate pork barrel spending into bills. When Norton tries to defend his father, he is ruled out of order. Feeney cautions Norton about continuing a feud with Rogers. In a television appearance, Rogers says he finds the junior senator to be more interested in fighting than the issues. Norton and Rogers continue to feud, and the newspapers report that Norton is no match for Rogers. Norton feels out-maneuvered by Rogers. While drunk, Feeney reveals to Norton that Rogers was once a member in good standing of "The Vindicators", an organization that is now on the Attorney General's subversive list. Norton leaves, and Feeney calls Mrs. Norton asking her to tell Norton to forget what he said.

=== Act III ===
The next morning, Feeney tells Norton that Rogers is not a tormentor. Rogers is critical of Norton because he thinks Norton's a lousy Senator. He urges Norton not to use mud to destroy Rogers. It would cross a basic line of decency and ethics. "Once you cross over that line carrying a big dirty stick, then every name you call, all the rotten things you do, you can sew them together and wear it as a coat, 'cause it will fit you."

Feeney tells Rogers that Norton knows his secret. Rogers has known that his past membership in "The Vindicators" would come out some day. He joined the group during the Depression. Feeney thinks that Rogers has made up for it. Feeney is ashamed that he gave the information to Norton.

Norton's father visits and offers his advice: "In politics, a man has to use every single possible weapon in his possession. If he doesn't, he's a bloody fool. In politics, you have to fight, you have to brawl, you have to claw, you have to hit low." He calls politics "a form of dirt farming where you raise careers out of muck." He describes the voters as "a mob of midgets . . . a soul-less, brainless, dull oxen-like mob." He tells his son not to worry about morals in politics and to Use the information: "Use it like a bomb on Monday morning. Explode it in Rogers' face. Rip him apart with it, make him crawl out of that chamber."

Rogers plans to resign. He rises on the Senate floor to make his announcement. Norton asks Rogers to yield. Norton asks Rogers to withdraw his comments about Norton's father. Rogers declines to do so. With dramatic music playing, Norton rises to disclose what he has learned. He pauses. He reconsiders and says he has nothing further to add.

Feeney asks Norton why he didn't use it. Norton says he doesn't know but for the first time he feels like he belongs in the Senate. Feeney agrees that Norton belongs and offers his opinion: "For some men, this isn't a pilot plan or a democracy down here. This is an arena. They walk into it to destroy one another. They wave one banner and use one excuse. They call it politics. They have one stock defense for every unprincipled act they perform, for every man they try to destroy and sometimes do destroy. And again, it's politics. Politics isn't a dirty thing, Mr. Senator. The dirt comes from the men."

Norton's father criticizes Norton's decision. Norton's wife urges him to see Rogers. They agree to visit Rogers together.

== Cast ==
The cast includes performances by:

- Wendell Corey as Sen. James Norton
- Chester Morris as Jack Feeney
- John Cromwell as Sen. Harvey Rogers
- Leora Dana as Margaret Norton
- Edgar Stehli as former Sen. Frank Norton
- Peter Turgeon as Humphreys
- Frances Sternhagen as Betty
- Harry Holcombe as Sen. Smithson

Betty Furness presents Westinghouse appliances in breaks after each of the acts.

== Production ==
Felix Jackson was the producer, and Franklin Schaffner directed. Alfredo Antonini was the musical director. Willard Levitas provided the settings, and Wes Laws was the set decorator. Robert Serling was credited with research.

Serling later complained of censorship concerning his script. He said: "One of the edicts that comes down from the Mount Sinai of Advertisers Row is that at no time in a political drama must a speech or character be equated with an existing political party or current political problems." Accordingly, Serling's script was vague about the political organization Rogers had joined in the 1930s. Serling also was forced to reduce the debate on the Senate floor into "shouting, gesticulating and talking in hieroglyphics about make-believe issues, using invented terminology, a kind of prolonged, unbelievable double-talk."

== Reception ==
In The Philadelphia Inquirer, Harry Harris called it an "engrossing drama" that restored Serling's prestige.

In the Chicago Tribune, John Fink wrote that the production's theme about the conflict between personal ambition and ideals "was present in the speeches, but not carried out in the dramatic terms." Fink also found Norton's character to be "too thinly drawn."
