= Adrian Morris (actor) =

American actor (1907–1941)

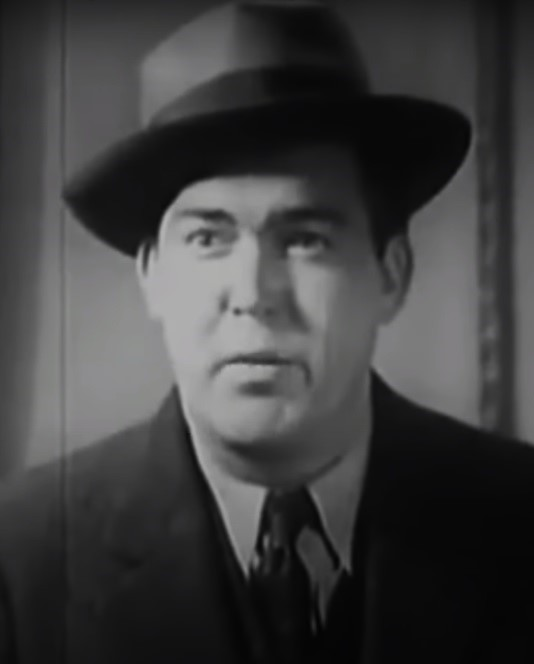
- Morris in One Frightened Night (1935)
- Born: Adrian Michael Morris; January 12, 1907; Mount Vernon, New York, U.S.
- Died: November 30, 1941 (aged 34); Los Angeles, California, U.S.
- Other name: Michael Morris
- Occupation: Actor
- Years active: 1931–1941
- Spouse: Eva Virginia Shipley
- Parents: William Morris; Etta Hawkins
- Relatives: Chester Morris (brother)

Adrian Michael Morris (January 12, 1907 – November 30, 1941) was an American actor of stage and film, and a younger brother of Chester Morris. As a child, Morris performed with his family in a vaudeville act. In his short 10-year career as a Hollywood character actor, he appeared in over 70 films, including Dirigible (1931), Me and My Gal (1932), Bureau of Missing Persons (1933), The Big Shakedown (1934), The Fighting Marines (1935), The Petrified Forest (1936), There Goes the Groom (1937), Angels with Dirty Faces (1938), Gone With the Wind (1939), The Grapes of Wrath (1940), and Blood and Sand (1941).

== Early life and family ==
Adrian Michael Morris was born in Mount Vernon, New York, one of four surviving children of Broadway stage actor William Morris and stage comedic actress Etta Hawkins. His siblings were screenwriter-actor Gordon Morris, actor Chester Morris, and actress Wilhelmina Morris. Another brother, Lloyd Morris, had died young.

As a six-year-old, Morris served as assistant to Chester who, by the time he was twelve, had developed an interest in performing magic tricks which often went wrong, to everyone's amusement. Both brothers also attended the same dancing school. In 1923, the whole Morris family teamed up to perform William Morris' original sketch called All the Horrors of Home, which premiered at the Palace Theatre, New York, then on the Keith-Orpheum vaudeville circuit for two years, including Proctor's Theatre, Mount Vernon, New York, and culminating in Los Angeles in 1925.

In 1929, Morris wrote—under the pseudonym of "Adrian O'Hara"—a column in the December copy of Talking Picture Magazine entitled "I Know Chester Morris", in which he praised his elder brother as a talented man excelling in music, painting and acting. Their brotherly friendship lasted for their entire lives.

All the success in this world couldn't possibly take away that terrific amount of truth, soul and sincerity on that boys make-up. It's firmly imbedded. I speak from practical experience, not interviews. I love the kid to death, and why not... I'm his little brother.

— Adrian O'Hara, "I Know Chester Morris".

== Career ==
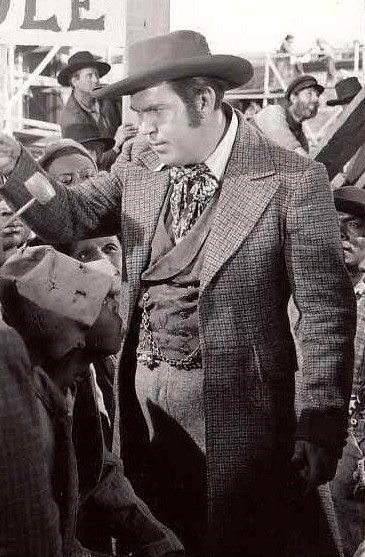
Morris in Gone With the Wind (1939)

Adrian Morris moved to Hollywood in 1929. In 1931, he made his first, uncredited appearance in Frank Capra's aviation epic Dirigible by Columbia, and had a supporting role in Howard Hughes' The Age for Love, directed by Frank Lloyd. Two more uncredited roles at Columbia followed the same year: the Officer in Arizona starring John Wayne, and Snooper the Henchman in The Pagan Lady starring Evelyn Brent, before other companies began to award him more visible parts with screen billing. After The Age for Love (1931), released by United Artists, he was cast as Allen by Raoul Walsh for Fox's romantic comedy-drama Me and My Gal (1932), with Spencer Tracy and Joan Bennett.

On February 26, 1932, Morris married stage actress Eva Virginia Shipley in Berverly Hills, and continued working regularly, playing uncredited or supporting parts in major films released in 1933, such as Warner Bros.' The Little Giant, with Edward G. Robinson; The Mayor of Hell with James Cagney; Bureau of Missing Persons, with Bette Davis, Pat O'Brien and Glenda Farrell; and the powerful Depression drama Wild Boys of the Road, with Frankie Darro. The same year, he also played the uncredited role of a crap shooter in Universal's King for a Night, directed by Kurt Neumann, and starring his brother Chester in the lead role.

From 1934 until the end of 1939, Morris appeared in a total of 45 major studio features, many of them top commercial and artistic successes made by the industry's greatest directors. At Warner Bros., he supported James Cagney and Ann Dvorak in G Men (1935); Paul Muni and Ann Dvorak again in Dr. Socrates (1935); Bette Davis, Leslie Howard, and Humphrey Bogart in The Petrified Forest (1936); and James Cagney, Pat O'Brien and Humphrey Bogart in Angels with Dirty Faces (1938). Morris was also a sidekick for Grant Withers in two serials: The Fighting Marines (1935) for Mascot Pictures and Radio Patrol (1937) for Universal Pictures.

Paramount Pictures cast him with W. C. Fields and Rochelle Hudson in Poppy (1936); Mae West, Edmund Lowe and Louis Armstrong in Every Day's a Holiday (1937); Sylvia Sidney and George Raft in You and Me (1938); Ronald Colman and Basil Rathbone in If I Were King (1938); and Barbara Stanwyck and Joel McCrea in Union Pacific (1939). At MGM, he appeared as support to Wallace Beery and Robert Young in West Point of the Air (1935); Paul Lukas and Madge Evans in Age of Indiscretion (1935); Robert Young and Madge Evans in Calm Yourself (1935); and Walter Pidgeon and Rita Johnson in 6,000 Enemies (1939).

RKO Radio cast him with Harry Carey and Hoot Gibson in Powdersmoke Range (1935), Paul Muni and Miriam Hopkins in The Woman I Love, and Ann Sothern and Burgess Meredith in There Goes the Groom (1937). At 20th Century Fox, he played a policeman in Mr. Moto's Gamble (1938), an entry in the Japanese detective series with a cast including Peter Lorre, Keye Luke and Lynn Bari. In 1939, he also appeared with Warner Baxter and Lynn Bari in The Return of the Cisco Kid; with Tyrone Power, Alice Faye and Al Jolson in Rose of Washington Square; and with Cesar Romero and Marjorie Weaver in The Cisco Kid and the Lady, all for 20th Century Fox.

In many of these films, he performed as a character actor, often uncredited or, later in his career, as "Michael Morris". His roles were usually of small-time hoodlum or rough-neck types, cowboys, policemen, and many other characters, such as the carpetbagger in Gone With the Wind (1939) and the hiring agent in The Grapes of Wrath (1940). For Nat Levine's Mascot Pictures, Morris played more prominent roles: Deputy Abner in the comic mystery One Frightened Night, and Sergeant Mack McGowan in the serial The Fighting Marines, both in 1935. In Wall Street Cowboy for Republic Pictures (1939), he appeared as Big Joe Gillespie opposite B-Western favorites Roy Rogers, George 'Gabby' Hayes and Raymond Hatton.

== Death ==
He was scheduled to begin playing in Chester's film I'll Be Back in a Flash—released as I Live on Danger (1942)—when he died suddenly of a brain hemorrhage on November 30, 1941, in Los Angeles. His final film, Fly-by-Night, was released posthumously on January 19, 1942.

== Complete filmography ==
Year	Title	Role	Notes
1931	Dirigible	Crewman	Uncredited
1931	Arizona	Officer	Uncredited
1931	The Pagan Lady	Snooper the Henchman	Uncredited
1931	The Age for Love	Jeff Aldrich	
1932	Me and My Gal	Detective Al Allen	
1933	Trick for Trick	Boldy	Uncredited
1933	The Little Giant	Joe Milano's Hood	Uncredited
1933	The Mayor of Hell	Car owner	Uncredited
1933	Bureau of Missing Persons	Irish Conlin	
1933	Wild Boys of the Road	Buggie Maylin	Uncredited
1933	King for a Night	Crap Shooter	Uncredited
1934	The Big Shakedown	Trigger	
1934	I Like It That Way	Lothario in Chinese Restaurant	Uncredited
1934	Let's Be Ritzy	Henry Robert	
1934	The Pursuit of Happiness	Thad Jennings	
1935	I'll Love You Always	Pigface	Uncredited
1935	West Point of the Air	Randolph Air Field Instructor	Uncredited
1935	G Men	Accomplice	Uncredited
1935	One Frightened Night	Deputy Sheriff	
1935	Age of Indiscretion	Gus	
1935	Stranded	Rivet Boss	Uncredited
1935	Calm Yourself	Dutch - Gangster	Uncredited
1935	Front Page Woman	Guard	Uncredited
1935	Powdersmoke Range	Brose Glascow	
1935	Dr. Socrates	Beanie	Uncredited
1935	Three Kids and a Queen	Federal Man	Uncredited
1935	Metropolitan	Electrician	Uncredited
1935	The Fighting Marines	Sergeant McGowan	
1936	The Petrified Forest	Ruby	
1936	Poppy	Constable Bowman	
1936	My American Wife	Vincent Cantillon	
1936	Rose Bowl	Doc	
1937	Her Husband Lies	Carwig	
1937	The Woman I Love	Marbot	
1937	Radio Patrol	Officer Sam Maloney	
1937	There Goes the Groom	Eddie	
1937	Every Day's a Holiday	Henchman	
1938	Mr. Moto's Gamble	Policeman	Uncredited
1938	You and Me	Knucks	
1938	If I Were King	Colin de Cayeulx	
1938	Angels with Dirty Faces	Blackie	
1939	Boy Slaves	State Policeman	Uncredited
1939	Tail Spin	Repo Man	Uncredited
1939	Sergeant Madden	Ringleader	Scenes deleted
1939	The Return of the Cisco Kid	Deputy Johnson	
1939	Union Pacific	Railwayman	Uncredited
1939	Rose of Washington Square	Jim	
1939	6,000 Enemies	"Bull" Snyder	
1939	Career	Irate Bank Customer	Uncredited
1939	They All Come Out	Judge in Kangaroo Court	Uncredited
1939	Coast Guard	First Expressman	Uncredited
1939	Wall Street Cowboy	Big Joe Gillespie	
1939	Chicken Wagon Family	Tough Guy	Uncredited
1939	$1,000 a Touchdown	Two ton Terry	Uncredited
1939	Gone With the Wind	Carpetbagger Orator	Uncredited
1939	The Cisco Kid and the Lady	Saloon Brawler	Uncredited
1940	The Grapes of Wrath	Agent	
1940	Know Your Money	Joe	Uncredited
1940	Castle on the Hudson	Prisoner	Uncredited
1940	Tear Gas Squad	Crusty, The Hit-Man	Uncredited
1940	Girl in 313	First Detective	
1940	Lucky Cisco Kid	Smoketree's Partner	Uncredited
1940	The Return of Frank James	Denver Detective	Uncredited
1940	Pier 13	Al Higgins	As Michael Morris
1940	Public Deb No. 1	Guard	Uncredited
1940	Christmas in July	Tom Darcy, a co-worker	As Michael Morris
1940	Florian	Cpl. Ernst	Uncredited
1940	Michael Shayne, Private Detective	Al	As Michael Morris
1941	Life with Henry	Reporter	Uncredited
1941	Sis Hopkins	Bodyguard	As Michael Morris
1941	Reaching for the Sun	Rita's Partner, Dance Hall	Uncredited
1941	Blood and Sand	La Pulga	As Michael Morris
1941	The Big Store	Piano-Mover	Uncredited
1941	Rags to Riches	Bickford	As Michael Morris
1941	Wild Geese Calling	Stout Guide	As Michael Morris
1941	Belle Starr	Major Grail's Orderly	Uncredited
1941	Marry the Boss's Daughter	Subway Guard	Uncredited
1942	Fly-by-Night	Officer John Prescott	Final film role
