= Brothers (1930 film) =

1930 film

- Film poster
- Directed by: Walter Lang
- Written by: Sidney Lazarus; Charles R. Condon
- Produced by: Harry Cohn
- Starring: Bert Lytell
- Cinematography: Ira H. Morgan
- Edited by: Gene Havlick
- Distributed by: Columbia Pictures
- Release date: October 19, 1930
- Running time: 63 minutes
- Country: United States
- Language: English

Brothers is a 1930 American pre-Code crime film directed by Walter Lang. A print of the film is preserved in the Library of Congress collection.

== Cast ==
- Bert Lytell as Bob Naughton/Eddie Connolly
- Dorothy Sebastian as Norma Moore
- William Morris as Dr. Moore
- Richard Tucker as Prosecuting Attorney
- Maurice Black as Giuseppe Michaelo Lorenzo
- Frank McCormack s Oily Joe
- Claire McDowell as Mrs. Bess Naughton
- Howard C. Hickman as John Naughton
- Francis McDonald as Tony
