= The Return of the Cisco Kid =

1939 film by Herbert I. Leeds

- Theatrical release poster
- Directed by: Herbert I. Leeds
- Screenplay by: Milton Sperling
- Based on: The Caballero's Way; 1907 Heart of the West (O. Henry story) by O. Henry
- Produced by: Kenneth Macgowan
- Starring: Warner Baxter; Lynn Bari; Cesar Romero; Henry Hull; Kane Richmond; C. Henry Gordon
- Cinematography: Charles G. Clarke
- Edited by: James B. Clark
- Music by: Cyril J. Mockridge
- Production company: 20th Century-Fox
- Distributed by: 20th Century-Fox
- Release date: April 28, 1939
- Running time: 70 minutes
- Country: United States
- Language: English

The Return of the Cisco Kid is a 1939 American Western film directed by Herbert I. Leeds and written by Milton Sperling. The film stars Warner Baxter, Lynn Bari, Cesar Romero, Henry Hull, Kane Richmond and C. Henry Gordon. The film was released on April 28, 1939, by 20th Century-Fox.

== Plot ==
The Cisco Kid goes on vacation to Arizona, there he finds himself attracted to Ann, notices that she is being manipulated by a businessman due to her grandfather's problems and decides to help them out.

== Cast ==
- Warner Baxter as The Cisco Kid
- Lynn Bari as Ann Carver
- Cesar Romero as Lopez
- Henry Hull as Colonel Joshua Bixby
- Kane Richmond as Alan Davis
- C. Henry Gordon as Mexican Captain
- Robert Barrat as Sheriff McNally
- Chris-Pin Martin as Gordito
- Adrian Morris as Deputy Johnson
- Soledad Jiménez as Mama Soledad
- Harry Strang as Deputy
- Arthur Aylesworth as Stagecoach Driver
- Paul E. Burns as Hotel Clerk
- Victor Kilian as Bartender at Stage Stop
- Eddy Waller as Guard on Stagecoach
- Ruth Gillette as Flora
- Ward Bond as Accused Rustler
- Ethan Laidlaw as Luke (uncredited)
