= The Gang Buster =

1931 film

- Theatrical release poster
- Directed by: A. Edward Sutherland
- Screenplay by: Percy Heath; Joseph L. Mankiewicz
- Starring: Jack Oakie; Jean Arthur; William "Stage" Boyd; Wynne Gibson; William Morris; Francis McDonald
- Cinematography: Harry Fischbeck
- Edited by: Jane Loring
- Production company: Paramount Pictures
- Distributed by: Paramount Pictures
- Release date: January 17, 1931
- Running time: 65 minutes
- Country: United States
- Language: English

The Gang Buster is a 1931 American Pre-Code comedy film directed by A. Edward Sutherland, and written by Percy Heath and Joseph L. Mankiewicz. The film stars Jack Oakie, Jean Arthur, William "Stage" Boyd, Wynne Gibson, William Morris and Francis McDonald. The film was released January 17, 1931, by Paramount Pictures.

== Cast ==
- Jack Oakie as 'Cyclone' Case
- Jean Arthur as Sylvia Martine
- William "Stage" Boyd as Mike Slade
- Wynne Gibson as Zella Cameron
- William Morris as Andrew Martine
- Francis McDonald as Pete Caltek
