= Chester Morris =

American actor (1901–1970)

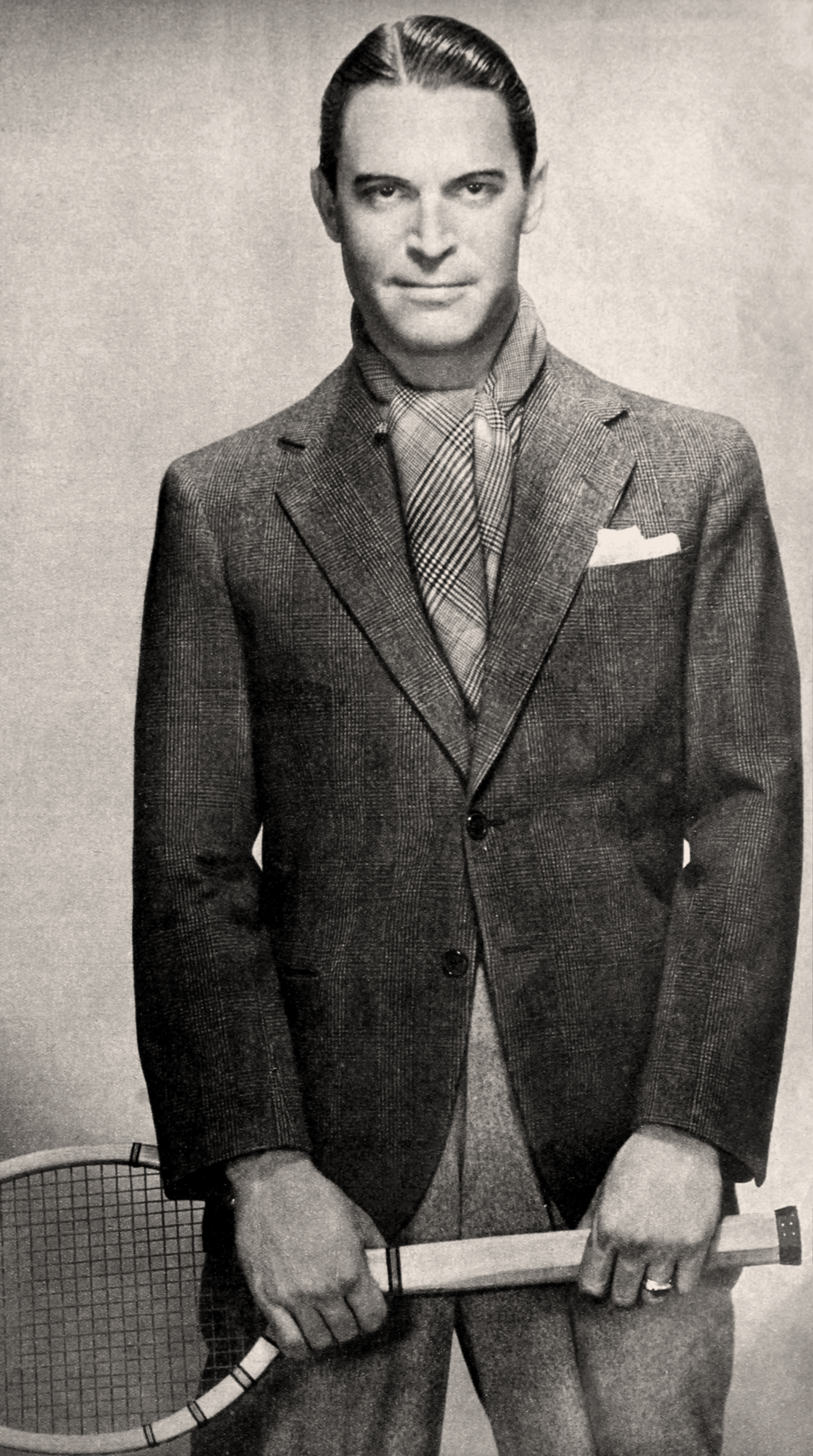
- Morris in 1934
- Born: John Chester Brooks Morris; February 16, 1901; New York City U.S.
- Died: September 11, 1970 (aged 69); New Hope, Pennsylvania, U.S.
- Occupation: Actor
- Years active: 1917–1970
- Spouses: Suzanne Kilbourne (m. 1926; div. 1940) Lillian Kenton Barker (m. 1940–1970)
- Children: 3
- Parent(s): William Morris; Etta Hawkins
- Relatives: Adrian Morris (brother)

John Chester Brooks Morris (February 16, 1901 – September 11, 1970) was an American stage, film, television, and radio actor. He had some prestigious film roles early in his career, and received an Academy Award nomination for Alibi (1929). Morris is remembered for portraying the title role in Boston Blackie, a criminal-turned-detective film series of the 1940s.

== Early years ==
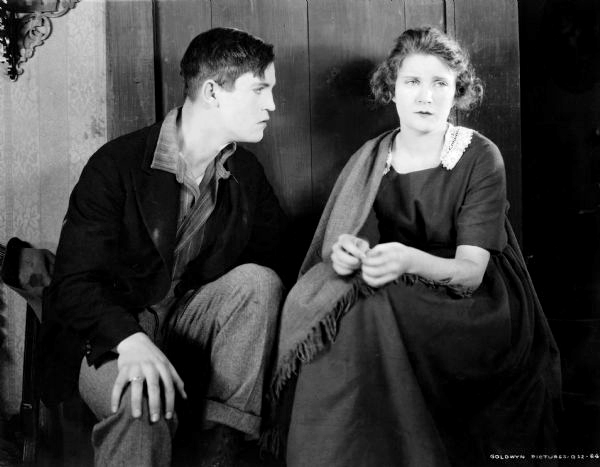
Morris and Mae Marsh in The Beloved Traitor (1918)

Chester Morris was born John Chester Brooks Morris in New York City, and was one of five children of Broadway stage actor William Morris and stage comedienne Etta Hawkins. His siblings who lived to adulthood were screenwriter-actor Gordon Morris, actor Adrian Morris, and actress Wilhelmina Morris. Another brother, Lloyd Morris, had died young.

Morris dropped out of school and began his Broadway career at 15 years old opposite Lionel Barrymore in The Copperhead. He made his film debut in the silent comedy-drama film An Amateur Orphan (1917).

After appearing in several more Broadway productions in the early 1920s, Morris joined his parents, sister, and two brothers, Gordon and Adrian, on the vaudeville circuit. From 1923, they performed William Morris' original sketch called All the Horrors of Home, which premiered at the Palace Theatre, New York, then on the Keith-Orpheum circuit for two years, including Proctor's Theatre, Mount Vernon, New York, and culminating in Los Angeles in 1925. Morris returned to Broadway with roles in The Home Towners (1926) and Yellow (1927). While appearing in the 1927 play Crime, he was spotted by a talent agent and was signed to a film contract.

== Career ==
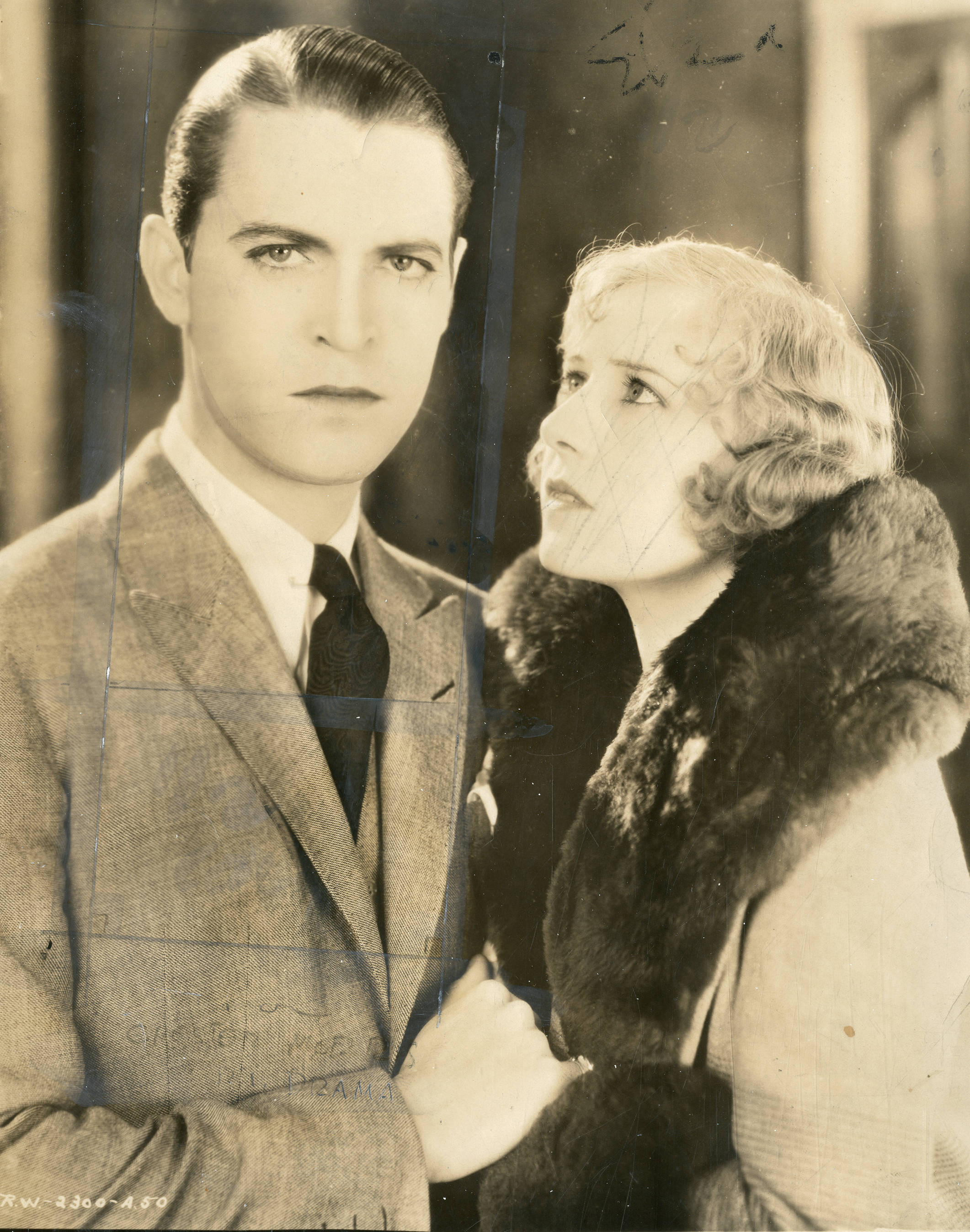
Morris (left, with Mae Busch) received an Oscar nomination for his performance as a gangster in Alibi (1929)

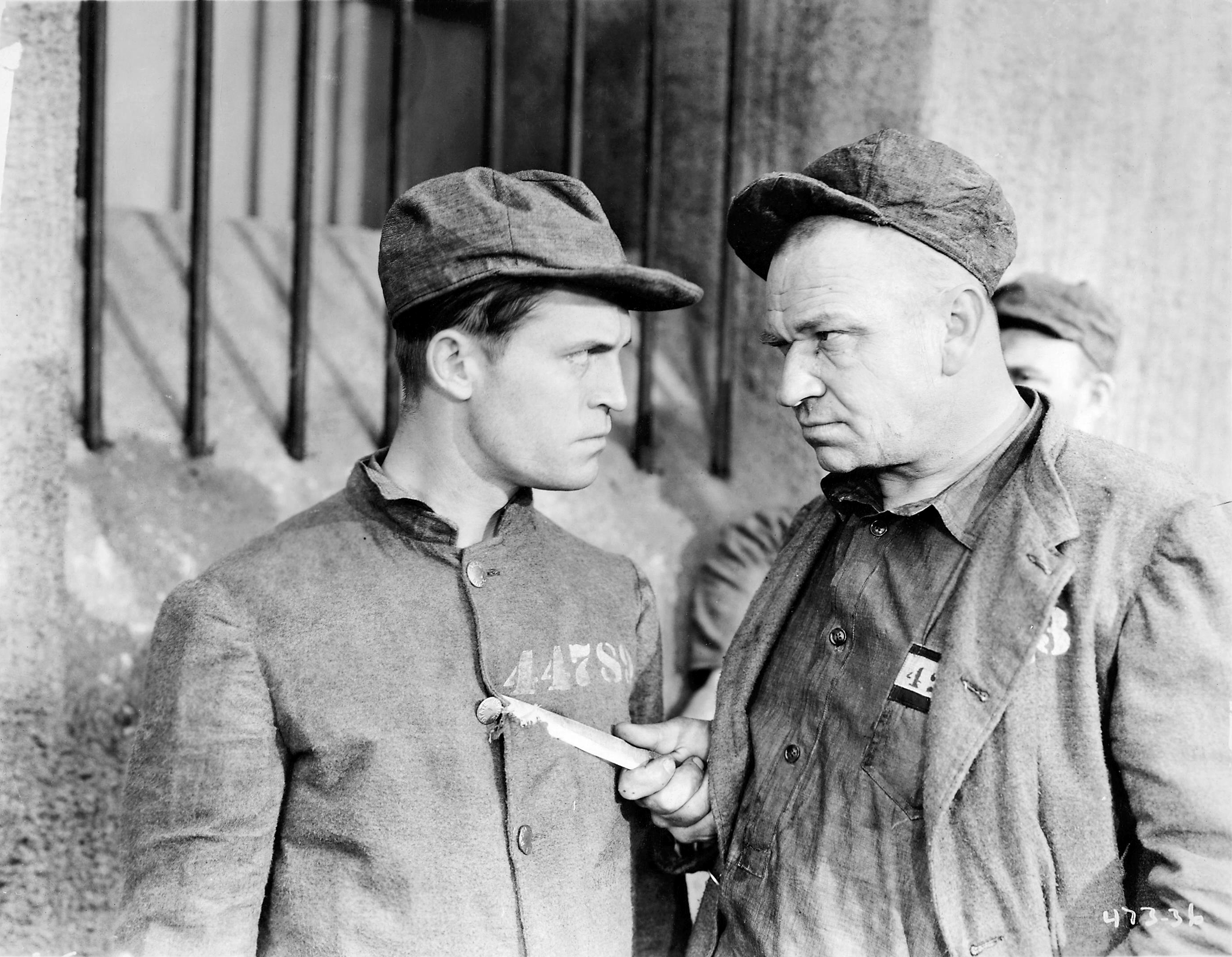
Morris and Wallace Beery in The Big House (1930)

Public Hero No. 1 trailer (1935)

Morris made his sound film debut in the 1929 film Alibi, for which he was nominated for an Academy Award for Best Actor. He followed with roles in Woman Trap (1929), The Case of Sergeant Grischa (1930) and The Divorcee, starring Norma Shearer in 1930. Later that year, Morris was cast as one of the leads (with Wallace Beery and Robert Montgomery) in the MGM prison drama The Big House. For the next two years, he worked steadily in films for United Artists and MGM and was cast opposite Jean Harlow in the 1932 comedy-drama Red-Headed Woman.

By the mid- to late 1930s, Morris' popularity had begun to wane and he was cast as the lead actor in such B-movies as Smashing the Rackets (1938) and Five Came Back (1939). In 1941, Morris' career was revived when he was cast as criminal-turned-detective Boston Blackie. Morris appeared in a total of 14 Boston Blackie films for Columbia Pictures, beginning with Meet Boston Blackie. He reprised the role of Boston Blackie for the radio series in 1944. During World War II, Morris performed magic tricks in over 350 USO shows. He had been practicing magic since the age of 12 and was considered a top amateur magician.

While appearing in the Boston Blackie series, Morris continued to appear in roles in other films mostly for Pine-Thomas films for Paramount Pictures. After appearing in 1949's Boston Blackie's Chinese Venture, the final Boston Blackie film, Morris largely retired from films. During the 1950s, he focused mainly on television and theatre, returning to Broadway in 1954 in the comedy The Fifth Season. During this time, Morris also appeared in guest spots for the anthology series Cameo Theatre, Lights Out, Tales of Tomorrow, Alcoa Premiere, Suspense, Danger, Robert Montgomery Presents, The Web, Phillip Morris Playhouse, Studio One, and Kraft Television Theatre. He briefly returned to films in 1955 with a role in the prison drama Unchained, followed by a role in the 1956 science-fiction horror film The She-Creature. In 1960, he had recurring role as Detective Lieutenant Max Ritter in the CBS summer replacement series, Diagnosis: Unknown. The series lasted a year, after which Morris appeared in the NBC television film A String of Beads. In November 1960, he returned to Broadway as Senator Bob Munson in the stage adaptation of the 1959 novel Advise and Consent. Morris remained with the production until it closed in May 1961. In October, he reprised his role for the touring production.

In the early to mid-1960s, Morris appeared in guest spots for the dramas Route 66, The Defenders, and Dr. Kildare. In 1965, he replaced Jack Albertson in the Broadway production of The Subject Was Roses. He reprised his role in the play for the touring production in 1966.

In mid-1968, Morris starred opposite Barbara Britton in the touring production of Where Did We Go Wrong?. After the production wrapped, he returned to his home in Manhattan, where his health began to decline. Morris was later diagnosed with stomach cancer.

Despite his declining health, Morris began work on what was his last film role, as Pop Weaver in the biographical drama The Great White Hope (1970). The film was released after his death. After filming wrapped, Morris joined the stage production of The Caine Mutiny Court Martial at the Bucks County Playhouse in New Hope, Pennsylvania, his final role.

== Personal life ==
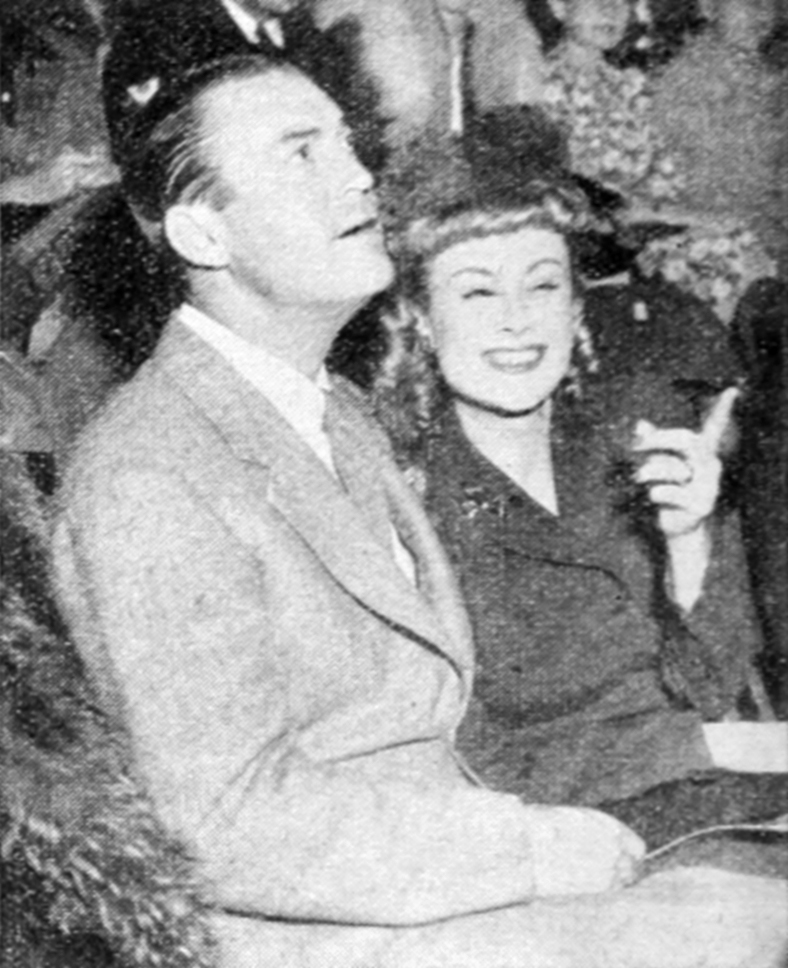
Morris and his wife Lillian in 1943

Morris was married twice. He first married Suzanne Kilbourne on November 8, 1926. They had two children, John Brooks and Cynthia. Kilbourne was granted an interlocutory divorce in November 1939 which was finalized on November 26, 1940.

On November 30, 1940, Morris married socialite Lillian Kenton Barker at the home of actor Frank Morgan. They had a son, Kenton, born in 1944. The couple remained married until Morris's death in 1970.

== Death ==
On September 11, 1970, Lee R. Yopp, the producer and director of The Caine Mutiny Court Martial, was scheduled to have lunch with Morris, who was suffering from stomach cancer. After Yopp could not reach Morris by phone at his motel room, he went to Morris's room, where he found the actor's body lying on the floor. The county coroner attributed Morris's death to an overdose of barbiturates. His remains were cremated and scattered over a German river.

== Select theatre credits ==
| Date | Title | Role | Notes |
|---|---|---|---|
| February 18 – June 1918 | The Copperhead | Sam Carter | Shubert Theatre, New York City |
| September 22 – October 1918 | Thunder | Sam Disbrow | Criterion Theatre, New York City |
| December 12, 1921 – April 1922 | The Mountain Man | Carey | Maxine Elliott Theatre, New York City |
| September 22 – October 1922 | The Exciters | Lexington Dalrymple | Times Square Theatre, New York City |
| January 23 – February 1923 | Extra | Wallace King | Longacre Theatre, New York City |
| August 23 – October 1926 | The Home Towners | Waly Calhoon | Hudson Theatre, New York City |
| September 21, 1926 – January 1927 | Yellow | Val Parker | National Theatre, New York City |
| February 22 – August 1927 | Crime | Rocky Morse | Eltinge 42nd Street Theatre, New York City |
| February 20 – May 1928 | Whispering Friends | Al Sheeler | Hudson Theatre, New York City |
| September 26 – October 1928 | Fast Life | Chester Palmer | Ambassador Theatre, New York City |
| June 4 – July 1951 | Detective Story | Principal Detective | Ivar Theater, Los Angeles, California |
| September 5 – October 23, 1954 | The Fifth Season | Detective {{{last}}} | Cort Theatre, New York City; Touring to Washington, D.C., Philadelphia, Pittsburgh and Chicago |
| February 27 – July 19, 1958 | Blue Denim | Major Bartley | Playhouse Theatre, New York City |
| November 17, 1960 – May 20, 1961 | Advise and Consent | Bob Munson | Cort Theatre, New York City |
| September 7, 1965 – May 21, 1966 | The Subject Was Roses | John Cleary | Helen Hayes Theatre, Henry Miller's Theatre and Belasco Theatre, New York City |

== Filmography ==
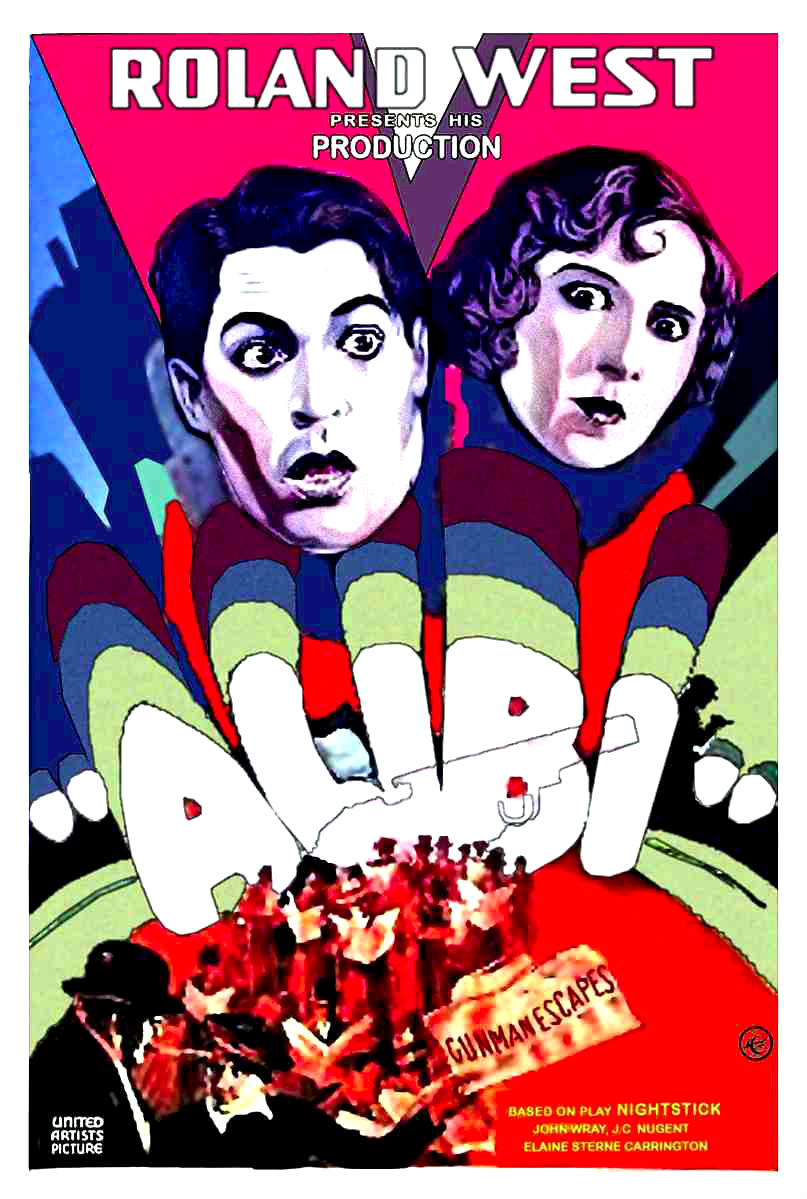
Poster for Alibi (1929)

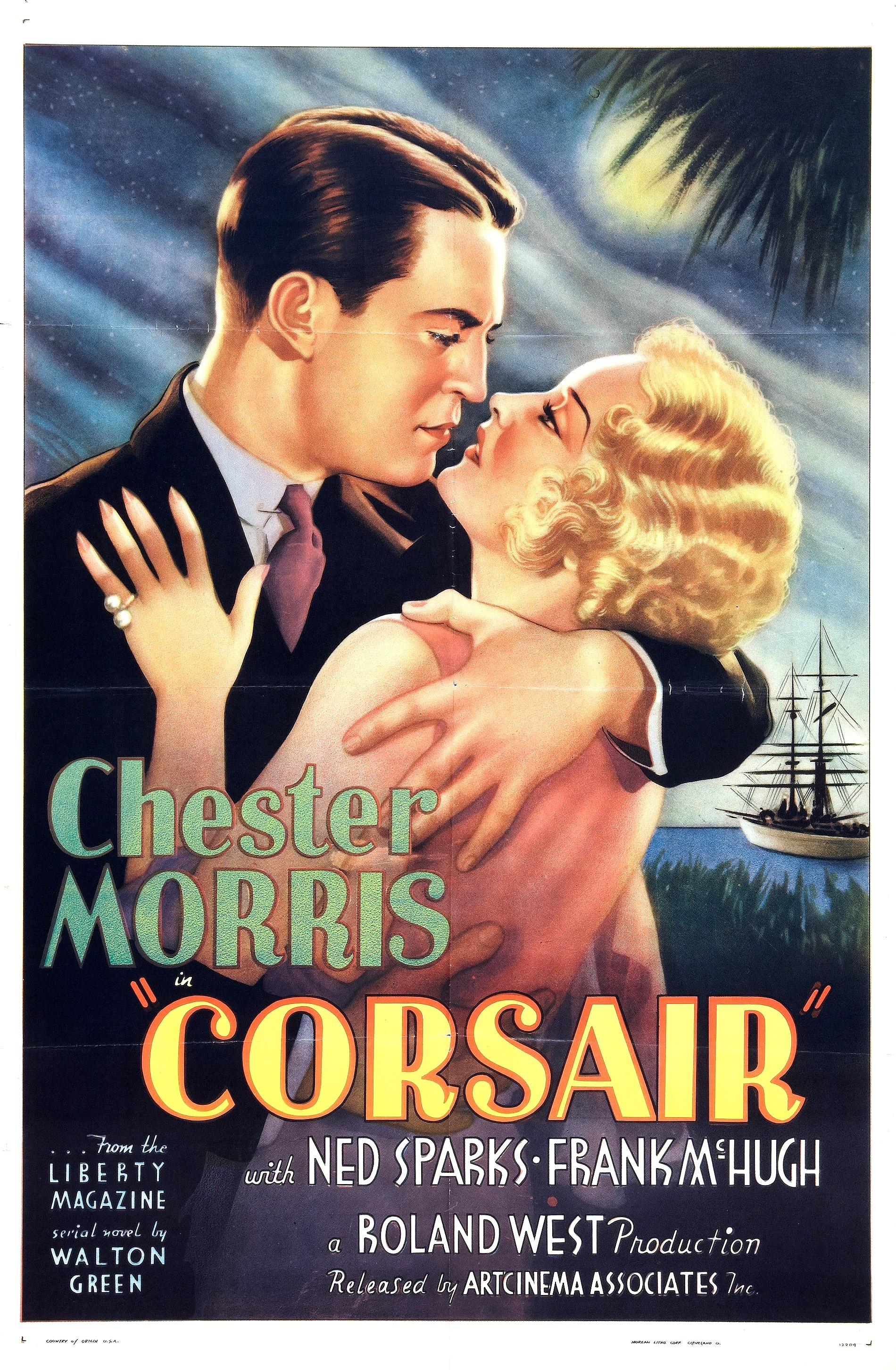
Poster for Corsair (1931)

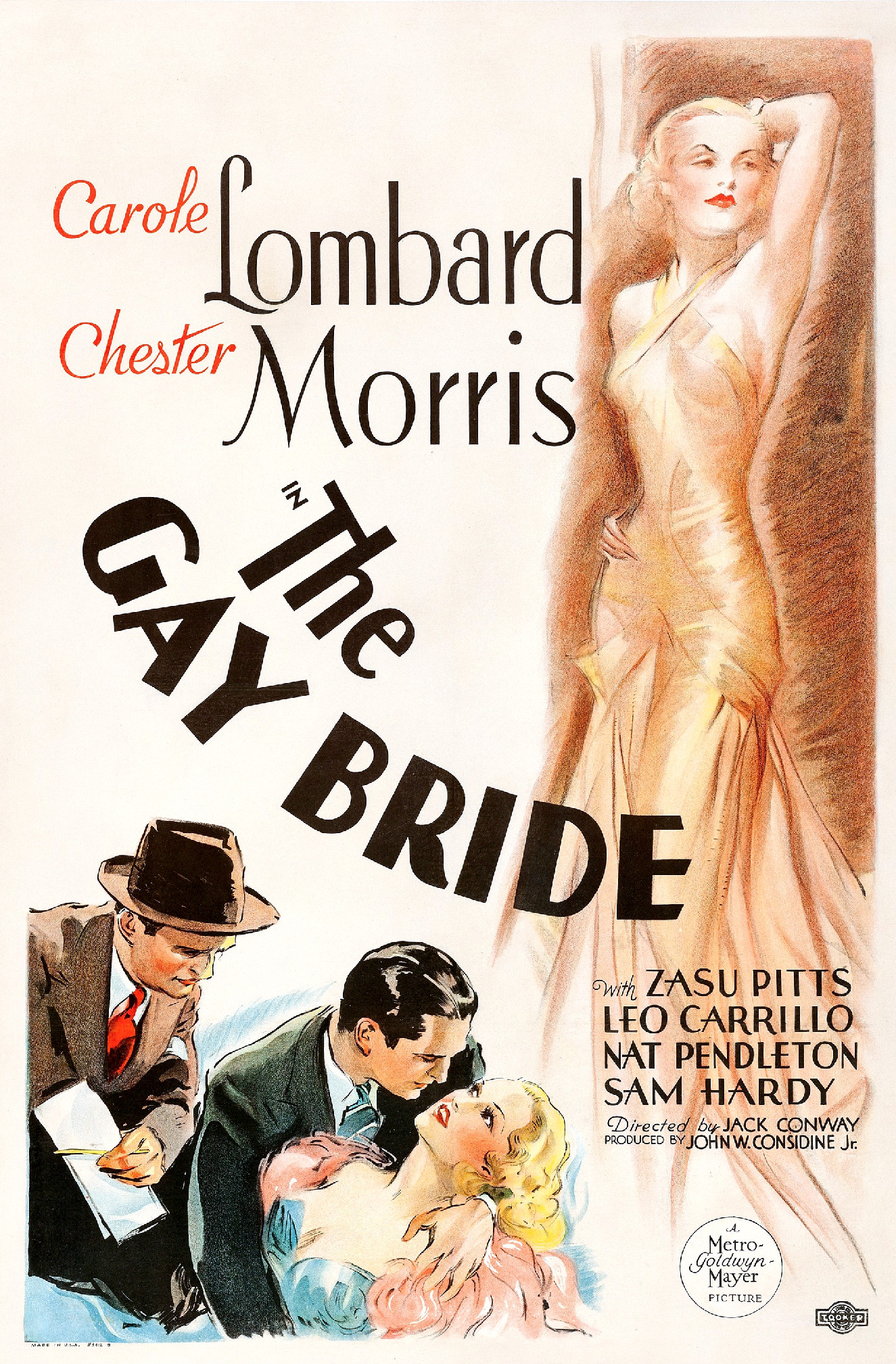
Poster for The Gay Bride (1934)

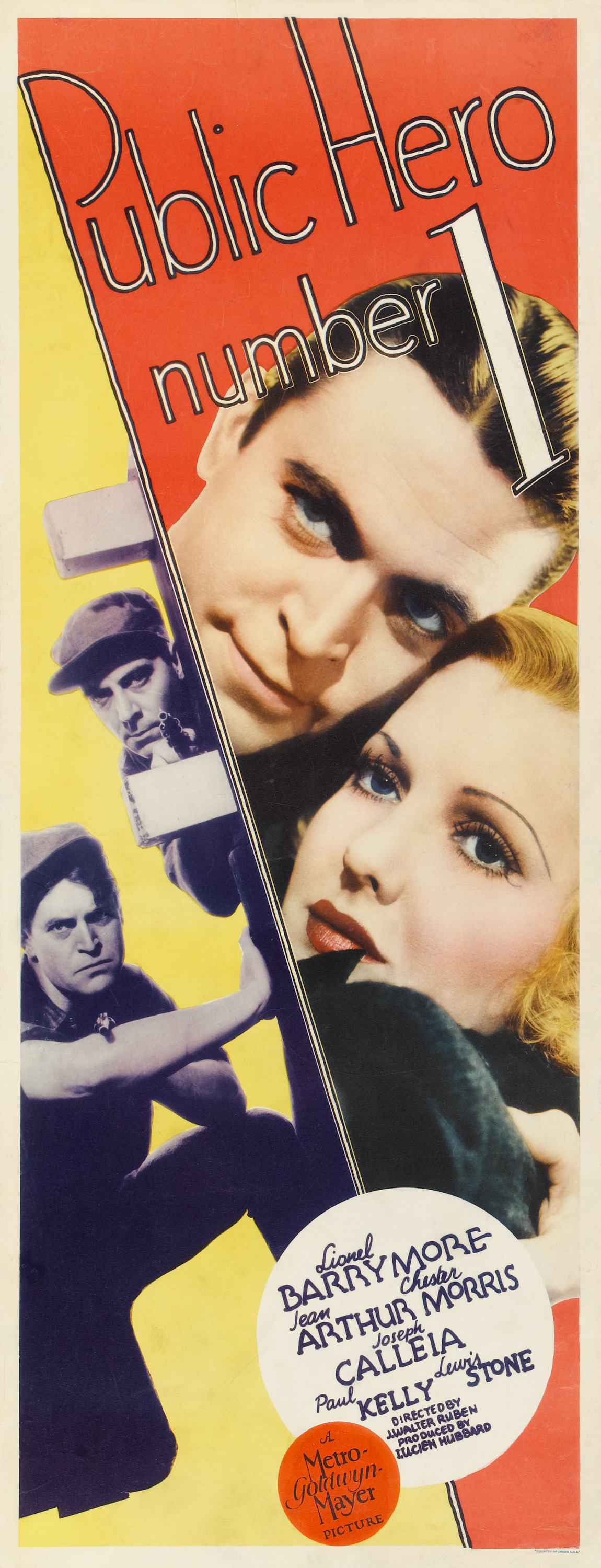
Poster for Public Hero ﹟1 (1935)

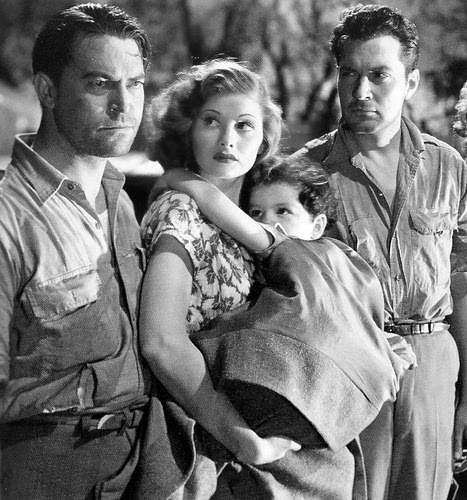
Chester Morris, Lucille Ball, Casey Johnson and Kent Taylor in Five Came Back (1939)

| Year | Title | Role | Notes |
|---|---|---|---|
| 1917 | An Amateur Orphan | Dick | Lost film |
| 1918 | The Beloved Traitor | Dan | Lost film |
| 1923 | Loyal Lives | O'Hara | Lost film |
| 1925 | The Road to Yesterday | Party Guest (uncredited) | |
| 1929 | Alibi | Chick Williams | Nominee for the Academy Award for Best Actor |
| 1929 | Fast Life | Paul Palmer | |
| 1929 | Woman Trap | Ray Malone | |
| 1929 | The Show of Shows | Cast member | |
| 1930 | Second Choice | Don Warren | Lost film |
| 1930 | Playing Around | Nickey Solomon | |
| 1930 | She Couldn't Say No | Jerry Casey | Lost film |
| 1930 | The Case of Sergeant Grischa | Sgt. Grischa Paprotkin | |
| 1930 | The Divorcee | Ted | |
| 1930 | The Big House | John Morgan | |
| 1930 | The Bat Whispers | Detective Anderson | |
| 1931 | Corsair | John Hawkes | |
| 1932 | Cock of the Air | Lieutenant Roger Craig | |
| 1932 | The Miracle Man | John Madison, also known as Doc | |
| 1932 | Sinners in the Sun | Jimmie Martin | |
| 1932 | Red-Headed Woman | Bill Legendre Jr. | |
| 1932 | Breach of Promise | James Pomeroy | |
| 1933 | Blondie Johnson | Danny Jones | |
| 1933 | Infernal Machine | Robert Holden | |
| 1933 | Tomorrow at Seven | Neil Broderick | |
| 1933 | Golden Harvest | Chris Martin | |
| 1933 | King for a Night | Bud Williams | |
| 1934 | Let's Talk It Over | Mike McGann | |
| 1934 | Gift of Gab | Doyle | |
| 1934 | Embarrassing Moments | Jerry Randolph | |
| 1934 | The Gay Bride | Office Boy, also known as Jimmie Burnham | |
| 1934 | Society Doctor | Dr. Bill Morgan | |
| 1935 | I've Been Around | Eric Foster | |
| 1935 | Princess O'Hara | Vic Toledo | |
| 1935 | Public Hero ﹟1 | Jeff Crane | |
| 1935 | Pursuit | Mitchell | |
| 1935 | Pirate Party on Catalina Isle | Pirate Captain (uncredited) | |
| 1936 | Three Godfathers | Bob | |
| 1936 | Moonlight Murder | Steve Farrell | |
| 1936 | Frankie and Johnnie | Johnnie Drew | |
| 1936 | Counterfeit | John Joseph Madden | |
| 1936 | They Met in a Taxi | Jimmy Donlin | |
| 1937 | The Devil's Playground | Robert Mason | |
| 1937 | I Promise to Pay | Eddie Lang | |
| 1937 | Flight from Glory | Smith | |
| 1937 | Sunday Night at the Trocadero | Himself | Short subject |
| 1938 | Law of the Underworld | Gene Fillmore | |
| 1938 | Sky Giant | Ken Stockton | |
| 1938 | Smashing the Rackets | Jim Conway | |
| 1939 | Pacific Liner | Doc Craig | |
| 1939 | Blind Alley | Hal Wilson | |
| 1939 | Five Came Back | Bill Brooks | |
| 1939 | Thunder Afloat | "Rocky" Blake | |
| 1940 | The Marines Fly High | Lt. Jim Malone | |
| 1940 | Wagons Westward | David Cook/Tim Cook | |
| 1940 | Girl from God's Country | Jim Holden, also known as Dr. Gary Currier | |
| 1941 | Meet Boston Blackie | Boston Blackie | |
| 1941 | No Hands on the Clock | Humphrey Campbell | |
| 1941 | Confessions of Boston Blackie | Boston Blackie | |
| 1942 | Canal Zone | "Hardtack" Hamilton | |
| 1942 | Alias Boston Blackie | Boston Blackie | |
| 1942 | I Live on Danger | Jeff Morrell | |
| 1942 | Boston Blackie Goes Hollywood | Boston Blackie | |
| 1942 | Wrecking Crew | Duke Mason | |
| 1943 | After Midnight with Boston Blackie | Boston Blackie | |
| 1943 | Aerial Gunner | Sgt. "Foxy" Pattis | |
| 1943 | High Explosive | Buzz Mitchell | |
| 1943 | The Chance of a Lifetime | Boston Blackie | |
| 1943 | Tornado | Pete Ramsey | |
| 1944 | Gambler's Choice | Ross Hadley | |
| 1944 | Secret Command | Jeff Gallagher | |
| 1944 | One Mysterious Night | Boston Blackie | |
| 1944 | Double Exposure | Larry Burke | |
| 1945 | Rough, Tough and Ready | Brad Crowder | |
| 1945 | Boston Blackie Booked on Suspicion | Boston Blackie | |
| 1945 | Boston Blackie's Rendezvous | Boston Blackie | |
| 1946 | One Way to Love | Barry Cole | |
| 1946 | A Close Call for Boston Blackie | Boston Blackie | |
| 1946 | The Phantom Thief | Boston Blackie | |
| 1946 | Boston Blackie and the Law | Boston Blackie | |
| 1947 | Blind Spot | Jeffrey Andrews | |
| 1948 | Trapped by Boston Blackie | Boston Blackie | |
| 1949 | Boston Blackie's Chinese Venture | Boston Blackie | |
| 1955 | Unchained | Warden Kenyon J. Scudder | |
| 1956 | The She-Creature | Dr. Carlo Lombardi | |
| 1961 | A String of Beads | Walter Harmon | TV movie |
| 1970 | The Great White Hope | Pop Weaver | |

== Select television credits ==
| Year | Title | Role | Episode(s) |
|---|---|---|---|
| 1951 | Starlight Theatre | Ed Kennedy | "Act of God Nonwithstanding" |
| 1952 | Schlitz Playhouse of Stars | The Dansker | "Billy Budd" |
| 1952 | Lux Video Theatre | Lefty | "Welcome Home, Lefty" |
| 1953 | Omnibus | The Battler | "The Battler" |
| 1955 | Appointment with Adventure | Lt. Kizer | "Time Bomb" |
| 1956 | Studio One | Jack Feeney | "The Arena" |
| 1957 | The Red Skelton Hour | Tony | "Clem's Fish Market" |
| 1957 | Dick Powell's Zane Grey Theatre | Frank Simmons | "Black Is for Grief" |
| 1957 | Playhouse 90 | Warden | "Child of Trouble" |
| 1958 | Pursuit | Mood | "Tiger on a Bicycle" |
| 1959 | The United States Steel Hour | Henry Vining | "Whisper of Evil" |
| 1960 | The Play of the Week | Swanson | "Morning's at Seven" |
| 1960 | Diagnosis: Unknown | Detective Lieutenant Ritter | Three episodes |
| 1960 | Rawhide | Hugh Clements | "Incident on the Road to Yesterday" |
| 1961 | Naked City | Frank Manfred | "Make-Believe Man" |
| 1961 | Checkmate | Albert Dewitt | "Portrait of a Man Running" |
| 1961 | Ben Casey | Walter Tyson | "An Expensive Glass of Water" |
| 1962 | Eleventh Hour | Frankie Morrison | "Along About Late in the Afternoon" |
| 1964 | Espionage | Harry Kemp | "Castles in Spain" |
| 1964 | East Side/West Side | Walt McGill | "The Name of the Game" |
| 1964 | Mr. Broadway | Orin Kelsey | "Don't Mention My Name in Sheboygan" |
| 1965 | Bob Hope Presents the Chrysler Theatre | Major Whitman | "The Fliers" |
| 1967 | Coronet Blue | Dr. Michael Wilson | "A Time to Be Born" |
| 1968 | Cimarron Strip | George Deeker | "Without Honor" |
| 1969 | Gentle Ben | Elsmore | "Busman's Holiday" |

== Select radio credits ==
| Year | Program | Notes |
|---|---|---|
| 1944 | Boston Blackie | Star of NBC series broadcast June 23 – September 15 |
| 1945 | Old Gold Comedy Theatre | "Boy Meets Girl" |
| 1946 | Suspense | "The Strange Death of Gordon Fitzroy" |
| 1952 | Philip Morris Playhouse | "Each Dawn I Die" |
