= Age of Indiscretion =

1935 film by Edward Ludwig

- Spanish language poster
- Directed by: Edward Ludwig
- Screenplay by: Leon Gordon; Otis Garrett
- Story by: Lenore Coffee
- Produced by: Phil Goldstone
- Starring: Paul Lukas; Madge Evans; Helen Vinson; May Robson; David Holt; Ralph Forbes
- Cinematography: Ernest Haller
- Edited by: Hugh Wynn
- Production company: Metro-Goldwyn-Mayer
- Distributed by: Loew's Inc.
- Release date: May 10, 1935
- Running time: 78 minutes
- Country: United States
- Language: English

Age of Indiscretion is a 1935 American drama film directed by Edward Ludwig and written by Leon Gordon and Otis Garrett. The film stars Paul Lukas, Madge Evans, Helen Vinson, May Robson, David Holt and Ralph Forbes.

== Plot ==
“A moralistic publisher discovers his wife is cheating on him”, she divorces him and remarries for money, leaving her young son with his father, only to pursue the young boy to satisfy her new mother-in-law who holds the purse.

== Cast ==
- Paul Lukas as Robert Lenhart
- Madge Evans as Maxine Bennett
- Helen Vinson as Eve Lenhart
- May Robson as Emma Shaw
- David Holt as Bill Lenhart
- Ralph Forbes as Felix Shaw
- Catherine Doucet as Jean Oliver
- Beryl Mercer as Mrs. Williams
- Minor Watson as Mr. Adams
- Shirley Ross as Dotty
- Stuart Casey as Miles
- Adrian Morris as Gus
- George Irving as Judge
