= Bureau of Missing Persons =

1933 film

- Theatrical release poster
- Directed by: Roy Del Ruth
- Screenplay by: Robert Presnell, Sr.
- Based on: Missing Men>br>1932 book by John H. Ayers and Carol Bird
- Produced by: Henry Blanke
- Starring: Bette Davis; Lewis Stone; Pat O'Brien; Glenda Farrell
- Cinematography: Barney McGill
- Music by: Bernhard Kaun; Winston Sharples
- Production company: First National Pictures
- Distributed by: Warner Bros. Pictures
- Release date: September 16, 1933
- Running time: 76 minutes
- Country: United States
- Language: English

Bureau of Missing Persons is a 1933 American pre-Code drama film with comic overtones directed by Roy Del Ruth and starring Bette Davis, Lewis Stone, Pat O'Brien and Glenda Farrell. The screenplay by Robert Presnell is based on the book Missing Men by former New York City Police Captain John H. Ayers and Carol Bird.

== Plot ==
Brash detective Butch Saunders is demoted from the robbery division to the bureau of missing persons. Captain Webb, his new boss, is unsure whether Butch will fit in or is on his way out of the police department. Webb assigns Joe Musik to show Butch around. Gradually, Butch earns Webb's respect and trust.

Cases the bureau handles include a philandering husband, a child prodigy who yearns to live a normal life, an aging bachelor whose housekeeper has disappeared, and an old lady whose daughter has run away, among others. Hank Slade works doggedly on one particular case - a missing wife - throughout the film, only to discover that she has been working at the bureau the whole time, right under his nose.

When attractive Norma Roberts comes looking for her missing Chicago investment banker husband Therme Roberts, Butch takes the case, making no secret that he is attracted to her, even though they are both married. She, however, keeps him at arm's length. Butch is later shocked when Captain Webb tells him that she is really Norma Williams and the man she claims is missing is actually the person she was on trial for murdering (before escaping) and not her husband at all. When Butch goes to arrest her at her apartment, he finds her hiding in a closet. Norma begs him to send the other policemen away, telling him she can explain everything. However, when he returns alone, she has fled.

She fakes her suicide by drowning and disappears, but shows up when Butch stages her funeral with a borrowed corpse. When Butch spots her, she tells him that, as Roberts' personal secretary, she discovered he had a mentally defective, idiotic twin brother, whom he took great pains to hide from everyone. She claims that, facing embezzlement charges, Therme murdered his brother and disappeared, having made it look as if he himself has been murdered. Norma attends the funeral in hopes that he would show up as well. She points a man out. Butch and Norma chase him to his apartment building. Butch tells Norma to remain outside for her safety while he apprehends the man. When he returns, Norma has vanished. The man denies being Roberts, but Butch takes him to the police station. There, to his relief, he finds Norma, who had gone for help. Webb tricks him into admitting he is Therme Roberts, and when Butch learns his gold-digging wife Belle never divorced her first husband (the husband shows up at the bureau looking for her), he and Norma are free to be together.

== Cast ==
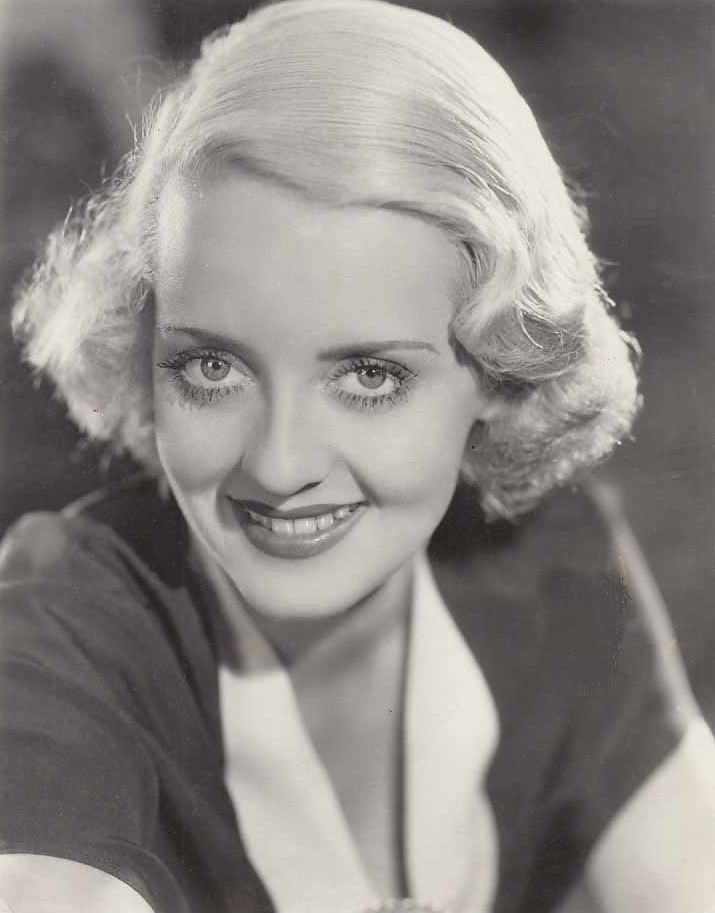
Bette Davis in Bureau of Missing Persons

- Bette Davis as Norma Roberts
- Lewis Stone as Captain Webb
- Pat O'Brien as Butch Saunders
- Glenda Farrell as Belle Saunders
- Allen Jenkins as Joe Musik
- Ruth Donnelly as Gwendolyn Harris, a runaway wife working at the bureau
- Hugh Herbert as Hank Slade
- Alan Dinehart as Therme Roberts
- Marjorie Gateson as Mrs. Paul
- George Chandler as Homer Howard
- Adrian Morris as Detective Irish Conlin

== Production ==
The film's working title was Missing Persons, and Warren William was originally slated to star. Instead it became the second on-screen pairing of Davis and O'Brien, both under contract to Warner Bros. Pictures, who had appeared Hell's House the previous year.

A print of the film is held by The Library of Congress.

== Release ==
Bureau of Missing Persons premiered at the Strand Theatre in New York on September 7, 1933. As a promotion, Warner Bros. Pictures promised in advertisements to pay $10,000 to Manhattan's missing Judge Joseph Force Crater if he turned himself in to the Bureau during the picture's engagement at the Strand. The film went into general release on September 16.

In 1936, the picture was reissued with the opening credits reconfigured to give top billing to Davis, who was by then the studio's leading female star.

Bureau of Missing Persons also premiered at the Grauman's Chinese Theatre in California on April 20, 1972.

=== Critical reception ===
Mordaunt Hall, critic for the New York Times, gave the film a generally positive notice and remarked on the fact-based elements: "It is quite obvious that fact is the basis of many of the incidents and if several of the characters are too rowdy at times to be lifelike, it does not detract from the general interest of the production." Time said, "This is as engrossing as the normal detective cinema, but what gives Bureau of Missing Persons substance and makes it interesting journalism as well as adequate fiction are convincing shots of how a Missing Persons Bureau works."

Variety called it "pretty fair entertainment ... steered clear of over sombreness or becoming too morbid", and added, "Just when it threatens to become banal, excellent trouping and some inspired dialoguing snap it back into proper gait." The Film Daily review said it was "marred by mixed incidents and hoke Hollywood ending".

Time Out London says, "With Del Ruth directing at screwball pace, things sometimes get a little too jokey; but at its best, in noting the obsessive quirks developed by officers, it has some claim to be considered an ancestor of Hill Street Blues." TV Guide describes it as an "amusing mystery film that is genuinely complex and intriguing, though it does take some slapstick turns. Davis fans will be disappointed as her headlining part is relatively small."
