= King for a Night =

1933 film

- Directed by: Kurt Neumann
- Screenplay by: William Anthony McGuire; Scott Pembroke; Jack O'Donnell
- Story by: William Anthony McGuire
- Produced by: Carl Laemmle Jr.
- Starring: Chester Morris; Helen Twelvetrees; Alice White
- Cinematography: Charles J. Stumar
- Edited by: Philip Cahn
- Music by: David Klatzkin
- Production company: Universal Pictures
- Distributed by: Universal Pictures
- Release date: December 9, 1933
- Running time: 78 minutes
- Country: United States
- Language: English

King for a Night is a 1933 American pre-Code crime film directed by Kurt Neumann starring Chester Morris and Helen Twelvetrees.

== Plot ==
A prizefighter is convicted of a murder that was actually committed by his sister.

== Cast ==
- Chester Morris as Bud Williams
- Helen Twelvetrees as Lillian Williams
- Alice White as Evelyn
- John Miljan as Walter Douglas
- Grant Mitchell as Rev. John Williams
- Frank Albertson as Dick Morris
- George Meeker as John Williams
- Warren Hymer as Goofy
- Max 'Slapsie Maxie' Rosenbloom as Maxie
- John Sheehan as Manny
- George E. Stone as Hymie
- Harland Tucker as Nick Merkle
- Harry Galfund as The Champ
- Clarence Wilson as Mr. Whistler
- Dorothy Granger as Dora
- Wade Boteler as McCue
- Adrian Morris as Crap Shooter

== Bibliography ==
- Quinlan, David. The Film Lover's Companion: An A to Z Guide to 2,000 Stars and the Movies They Made. Carol Publishing Group, 1997.
