= William DuBois (writer) =

American dramatist (1903–1997)

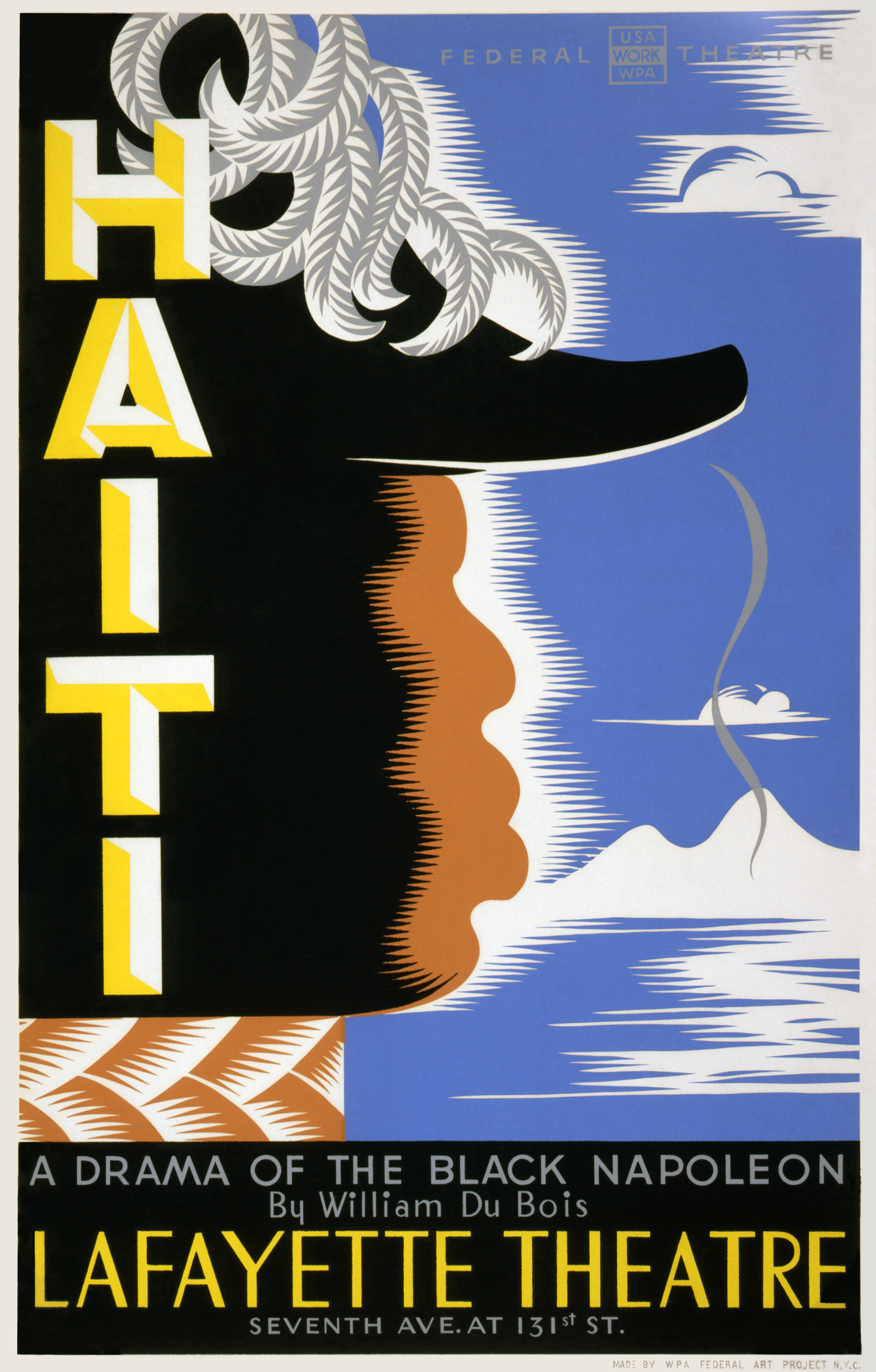
Poster for William DuBois' play Haiti, produced by the Federal Theatre Project (1938)

William DuBois (November 29, 1903 – March 16, 1997) was an American playwright, novelist and longtime editor of The New York Times Book Review.

== Biography ==
William DuBois was born in St. Augustine, Florida, in 1903, to parents Virginia Markel DuBois and William Henry Thompson DuBois. He graduated from Columbia University in 1925 with a degree in journalism and upon graduation went to work at The New York Times in 1926. He went on to become an editor for the New York Times Book Review where he wrote reviews and articles. DuBois retired from The Times in 1973.

DuBois wrote a number of Broadway plays including Pagan Lady (1930) and I Loved You Wednesday (1932). DuBois wrote the play Haiti (1938) for the Federal Theatre Project. The play was produced by the Negro Theatre Unit and presented at the Lafayette Theatre in Harlem and toured to Boston. The play's authorship has often been misattributed to the black scholar W. E. B. Du Bois because of the similarity of names.

His novels include The Island in the Square (1947), set in New York City in the 1920s; A Season to Beware (1956), about the worlds of journalism and publishing, and The Falcon's Shadow (1958), about the travails of the theater. He also worked as a silent writer with Frank G. Slaughter on 27 of his historical novels.
