= There Goes the Groom (film) =

1937 film by Joseph Santley

- theatrical poster
- Directed by: Joseph Santley
- Screenplay by: S.K. Lauren; Dorothy Yost; Harold Kussel
- Based on: Let Freedom Swing; 1937 story in American Magazine by David Garth
- Produced by: Albert Lewis
- Starring: Ann Sothern; Burgess Meredith; Mary Boland
- Cinematography: Milton R. Krasner
- Edited by: Jack Hively
- Production company: RKO Radio Pictures
- Distributed by: RKO Radio Pictures
- Release date: October 29, 1937 (US)
- Running time: 65 minutes
- Country: United States
- Language: English

There Goes the Groom is a 1937 screwball comedy film directed by Joseph Santley and starring Ann Sothern and Burgess Meredith. It was Burgess Meredith's second film and his first screen comedy; his first film, Winterset (1936), was a serious romantic drama.

== Plot ==
Dick Matthews (Burgess Meredith), just out of college, heads for the gold fields of Alaska to find his fortune. When he returns to marry his girl friend Janet Russell (Louise Henry), he discovers that she is no longer interested him. When her mother learns that the fellow has struck it rich, she changes her daughter's mind. Unfortunately, the young man has become enamored of the girl's little sister Betty (Ann Sothern).

== Cast ==
- Ann Sothern as Betty Russell
- Burgess Meredith as Dick Matthews
- Mary Boland as Mrs. Russell
- Onslow Stevens as Dr. Becker
- William Brisbane as Potter Russell
- Louise Henry as Janet Russell
- Roger Imhof as Hank
- Sumner Getchell as Billy Rapp
- George Irving as Yacht Captain
- Leona Roberts as Martha
- Adrian Morris as Eddie - Interne

== Production ==
The working title for the film was "Don't Forget to Remember". The part played by Burgess Meredith was originally scheduled to be played by John Boles.

== Critical response ==
Variety said about the film, "The yarn is well-worn around the edges, but ... buoyantly and skillfully acted by each least or large member of the cast... The direction, camera and production are all first-rate. Theatres catering to smart clientele should especially look into There Goes the Groom," while The New York Times said it was "an amiable comedy [which] ... may best be described as a cinematic exercise for Burgess Meredith, who dominates the whole affair. His performance, like the film, is occasionally brilliant, but on the whole does not merit more than a polite, indulgent commendation... [He] appears to be more at ease before the camera than he was in the memorable Winterset. His approach is less strained and he seems to have dropped most of his stage mannerisms."
