= Academy Award for Best Adapted Screenplay =

Category of film award

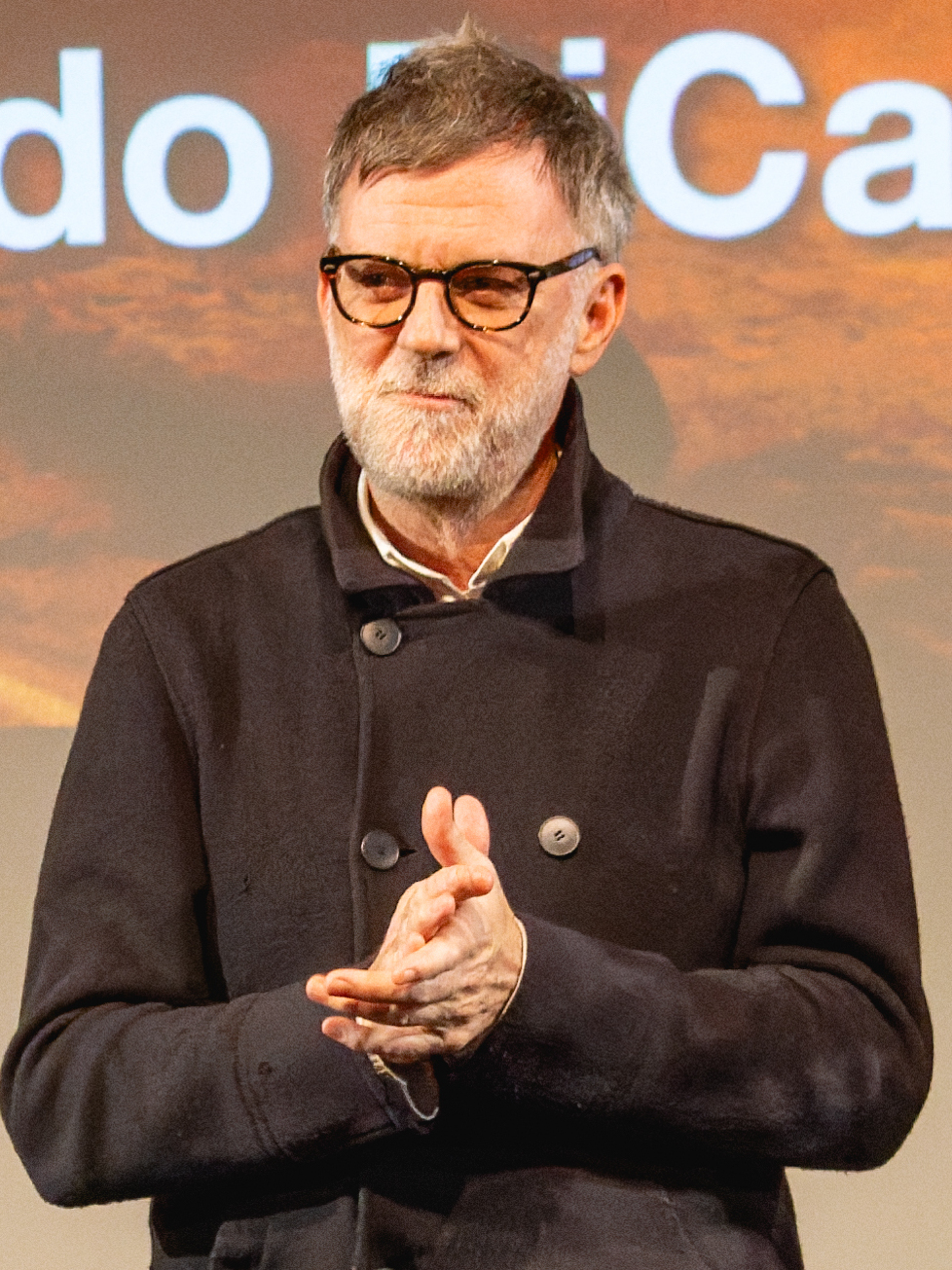
- The 2026 recipient: Paul Thomas Anderson
- Country: United States
- Presented by: Academy of Motion Picture Arts and Sciences (AMPAS)
- First award: 1929
- Most recent winner: Paul Thomas Anderson, One Battle After Another (2025)
- Website: oscars.org

The Academy Award for Best Adapted Screenplay (formerly known as the Academy Award for Best Screenplay – Based on Material from Another Medium) is the Academy Award for the best screenplay adapted from previously established material. The most frequently adapted media are novels, but other adapted narrative formats include stage plays, musicals, short stories, TV series, and other films and film characters. All sequels are also considered adaptations by this standard, being based on the story and characters of the original film.

Prior to its current name, the award was known as the Academy Award for Best Screenplay Based On Material From Another Medium. The Best Adapted Screenplay category has been a part of the Academy Awards since their inception.

== Superlatives ==
The first person to win twice in this category was Joseph L. Mankiewicz, who won the award in two consecutive years, 1949 and 1950. Others to win twice in this category include George Seaton, Robert Bolt (who also won in consecutive years), Francis Ford Coppola, Mario Puzo, Alvin Sargent, Ruth Prawer Jhabvala, Michael Wilson, Alexander Payne and Christopher Hampton. Payne won both awards as part of a writing team, with Jim Taylor for Sideways and Jim Rash and Nat Faxon for The Descendants. Michael Wilson was blacklisted at the time of his second Oscar, so the award was given to a front (novelist Pierre Boulle). However, the Academy officially recognized him as the winner several years later.

Billy Wilder, Charles Brackett, Paddy Chayefsky, Francis Ford Coppola, Horton Foote, William Goldman, Robert Benton, Bo Goldman, Waldo Salt, and the Coen brothers have won Oscars for both original and adapted screenplays.

Frances Marion (The Big House) was the first woman to win in any screenplay category, although she won for her original script for Best Writing, which then included both original and adapted screenplays before a separate award for Best Original Screenplay was introduced. Sarah Y. Mason (Little Women) was the first woman to win for adaptation from previously established material; she shared the award with her husband, Victor Heerman. They are also the first of two married couples to win in this category; Peter Jackson and Fran Walsh (The Lord of the Rings: The Return of the King) are the others.

Pierre Collings and Sheridan Gibney (The Story of Louis Pasteur) were the first to win for adapting their own work.

Philip G. Epstein and Julius J. Epstein (Casablanca) are the first siblings to win in this category. James Goldman (The Lion in Winter) and William Goldman (All the President's Men) are the first siblings to win for separate films. Joel Coen and Ethan Coen (No Country for Old Men) are the third winning siblings.

Mario Puzo is the one of two writers whose work has been adapted and resulted in two wins. Puzo's novel The Godfather resulted in wins in 1972 and 1974 for himself and Francis Ford Coppola. The other is E. M. Forster, whose novels A Room with a View and Howards End resulted in wins for Ruth Prawer Jhabvala.

Larry McMurtry is the only person who has won for adapting someone else's work (Brokeback Mountain), and whose own work has been adapted by someone else, resulting in a win (Terms of Endearment).

William Monahan (The Departed) and Sian Heder (CODA) are the only people who have won this award by using another full-length feature film as the credited source of the adaptation.

Geoffrey S. Fletcher (Precious), John Ridley (12 Years a Slave) and Cord Jefferson (American Fiction) are the only African-Americans to win solo in this category; Fletcher is also the first African-American to win in any writing category. Barry Jenkins and Tarell Alvin McCraney (Moonlight) are the first African-American writing duo to win; Spike Lee and Kevin Willmott (BlacKkKlansman) are the second, although their co-writers, David Rabinowitz and Charlie Wachtel, are both white.

James Ivory (Call Me by Your Name) is the oldest person to receive the award at age 89. Charlie Wachtel (BlacKkKlansman) is the youngest at age 32.

Taika Waititi (Jojo Rabbit) is the first person of Māori descent to receive the award.

Emma Thompson (Sense and Sensibility) is the only winner who has also won for acting. Winners Billy Bob Thornton (Sling Blade) and John Huston (The Treasure of the Sierra Madre) have been nominated for acting but not won.

Charles Schnee (The Bad and the Beautiful), Billy Bob Thornton (Sling Blade), and Bill Condon (Gods and Monsters) are the only winners whose respective films were not nominated for Best Picture.

== Notable nominees ==
Noted novelists and playwrights nominated in this category include: George Bernard Shaw (who shared an award for an adaptation of his play Pygmalion), Graham Greene, Tennessee Williams, Vladimir Nabokov, James Hilton, Dashiell Hammett, Raymond Chandler, Lillian Hellman, Irwin Shaw, James Agee, Norman Corwin, S. J. Perelman, Terence Rattigan, John Osborne, Robert Bolt, Harold Pinter, David Mamet, Larry McMurtry, Arthur Miller, John Irving, David Hare, Tony Kushner, August Wilson, Florian Zeller and Kazuo Ishiguro.

Ted Elliott, Roger S. H. Schulman, Joe Stillman & Terry Rossio, writers of Shrek and Michael Arndt, John Lasseter, Andrew Stanton & Lee Unkrich, writers of Toy Story 3, are as of 2020, the only writers to be nominated for an animated film.

Scott Frank, James Mangold and Michael Green, writers of Logan, are the first writers to be nominated for a film based on superhero comic books (the X-Men).

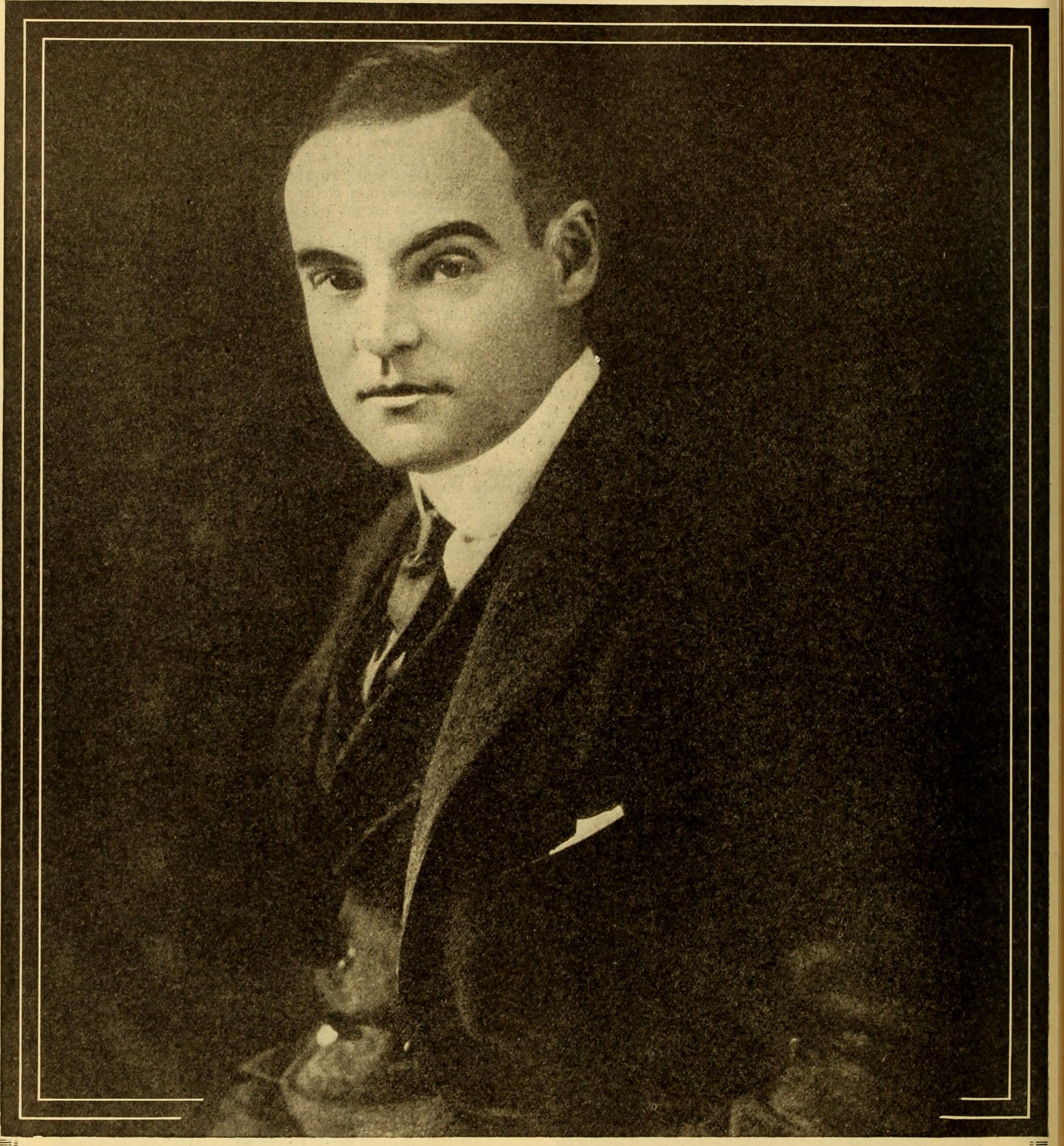
Howard Estabrook won for Cimarron (1931).

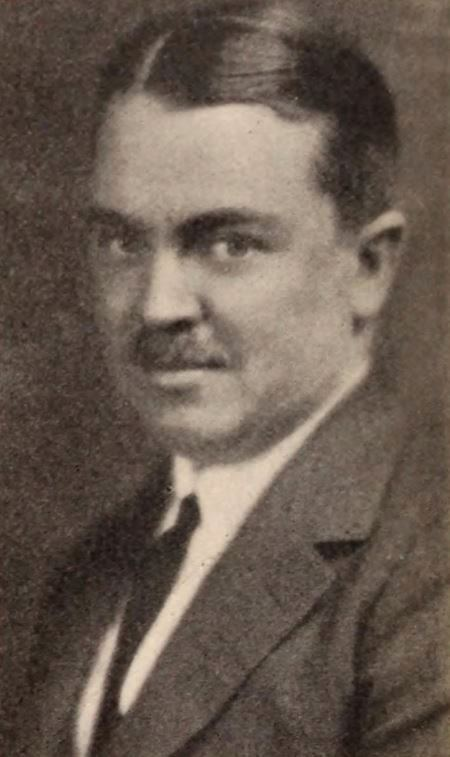
Victor Heerman co-won for Little Women (1933).

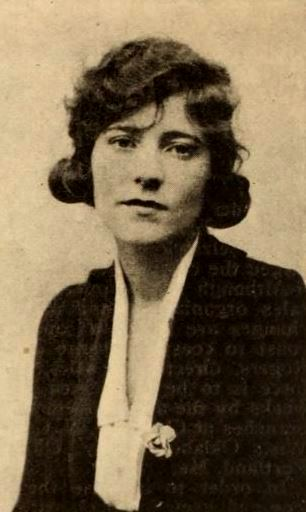
Sarah Y. Mason co-won for Little Women (1933).

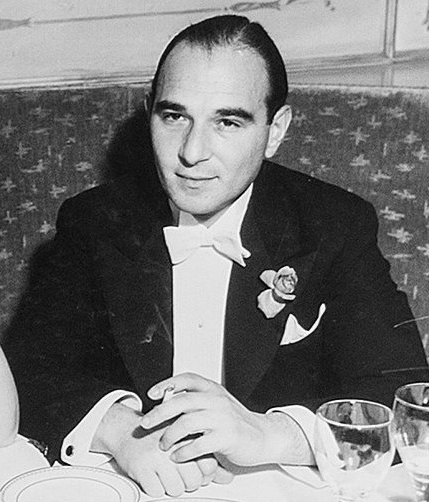
Robert Riskin won for It Happened One Night (1934).

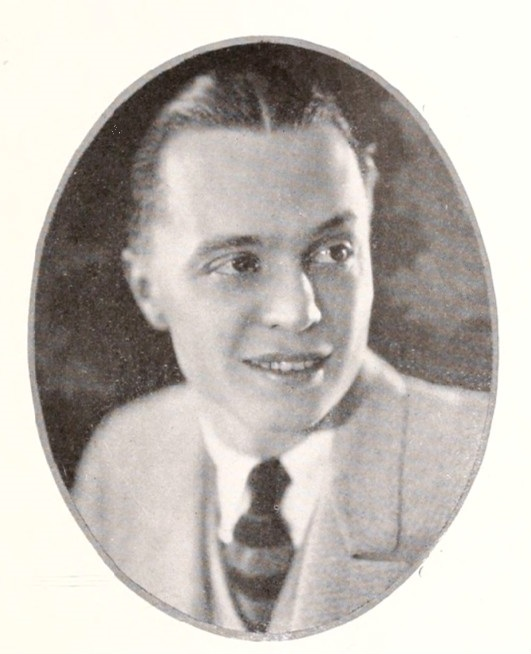
Pierre Collings co-won for The Story of Louis Pasteur (1936).

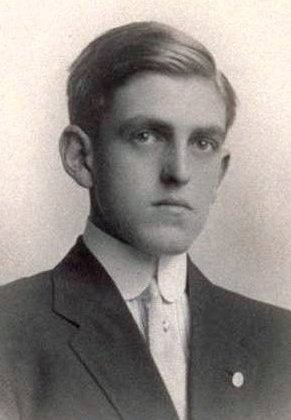
Sidney Howard won the award posthumously for Gone with the Wind (1939).

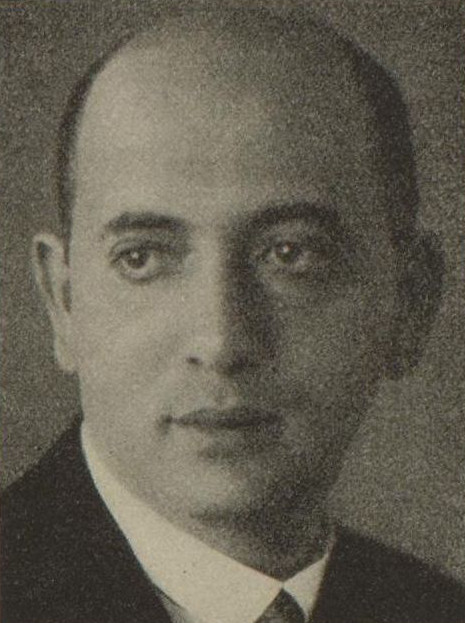
George Froeschel co-won for Mrs. Miniver (1942).

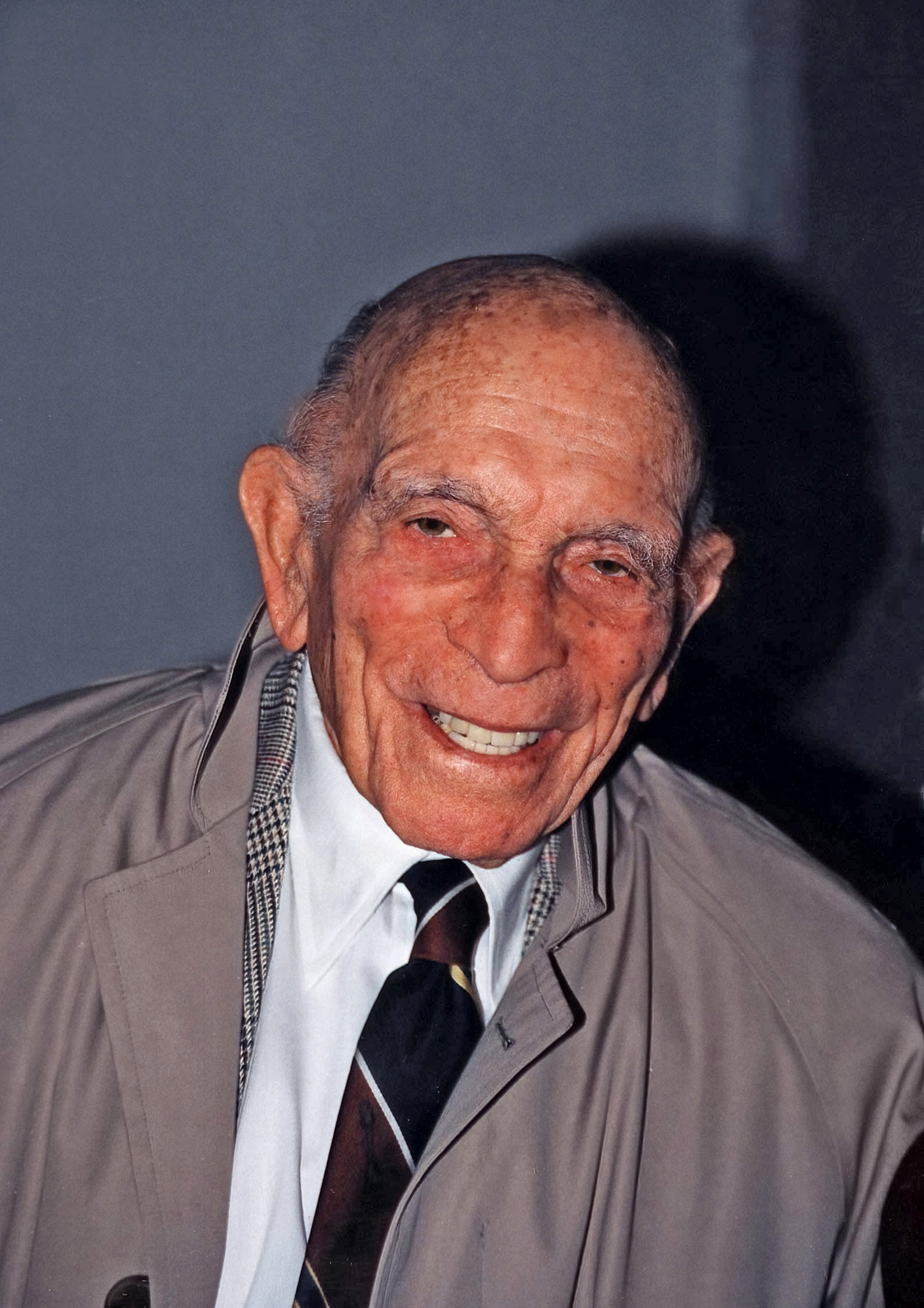
Julius J. Epstein co-won for Casablanca (1943).

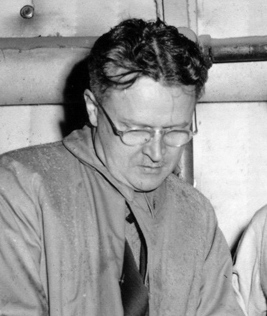
Charles Brackett co-won for The Lost Weekend (1945).

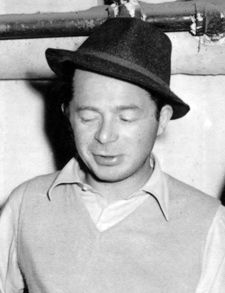
Billy Wilder co-won for The Lost Weekend (1945).

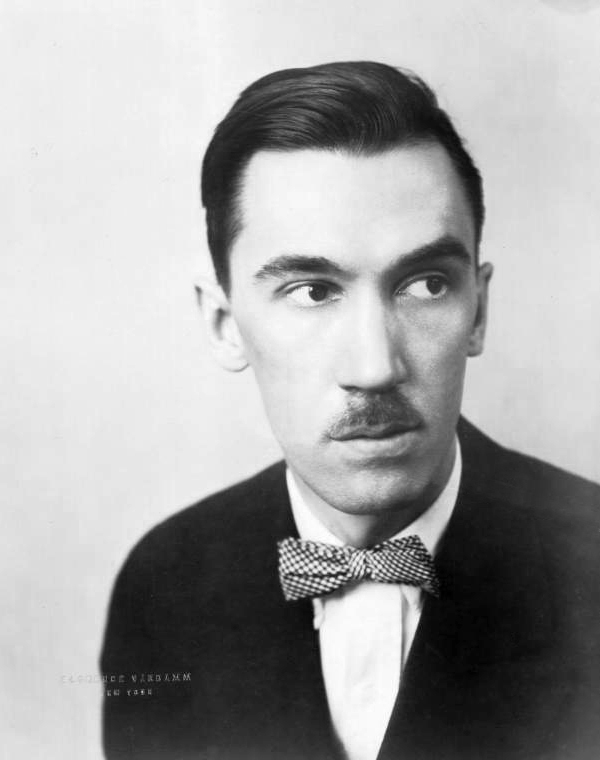
Robert E. Sherwood won for The Best Years of Our Lives (1946).

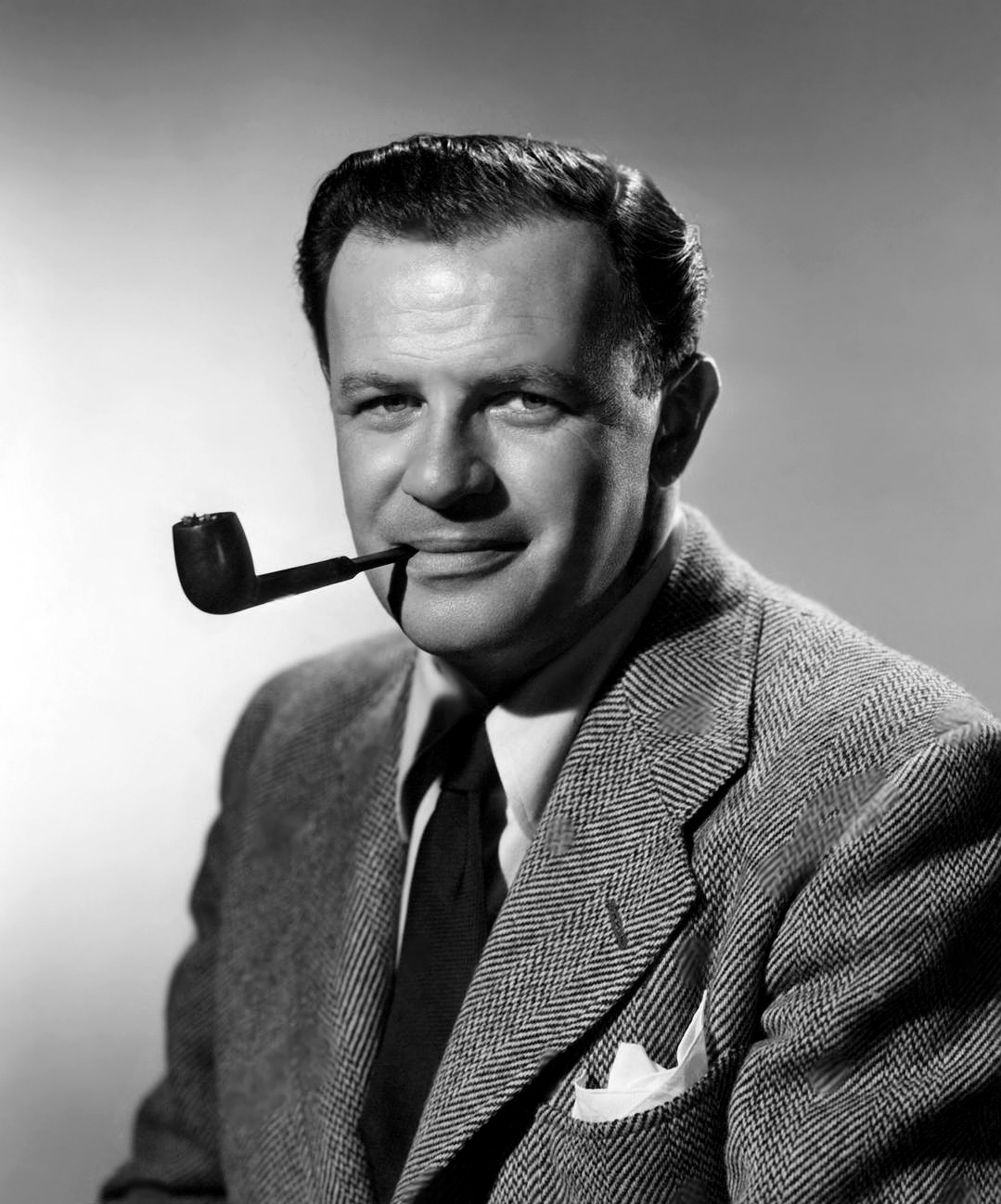
Joseph L. Mankiewicz won the award two years in a row, first for A Letter to Three Wives (1949) and then for All About Eve (1950).

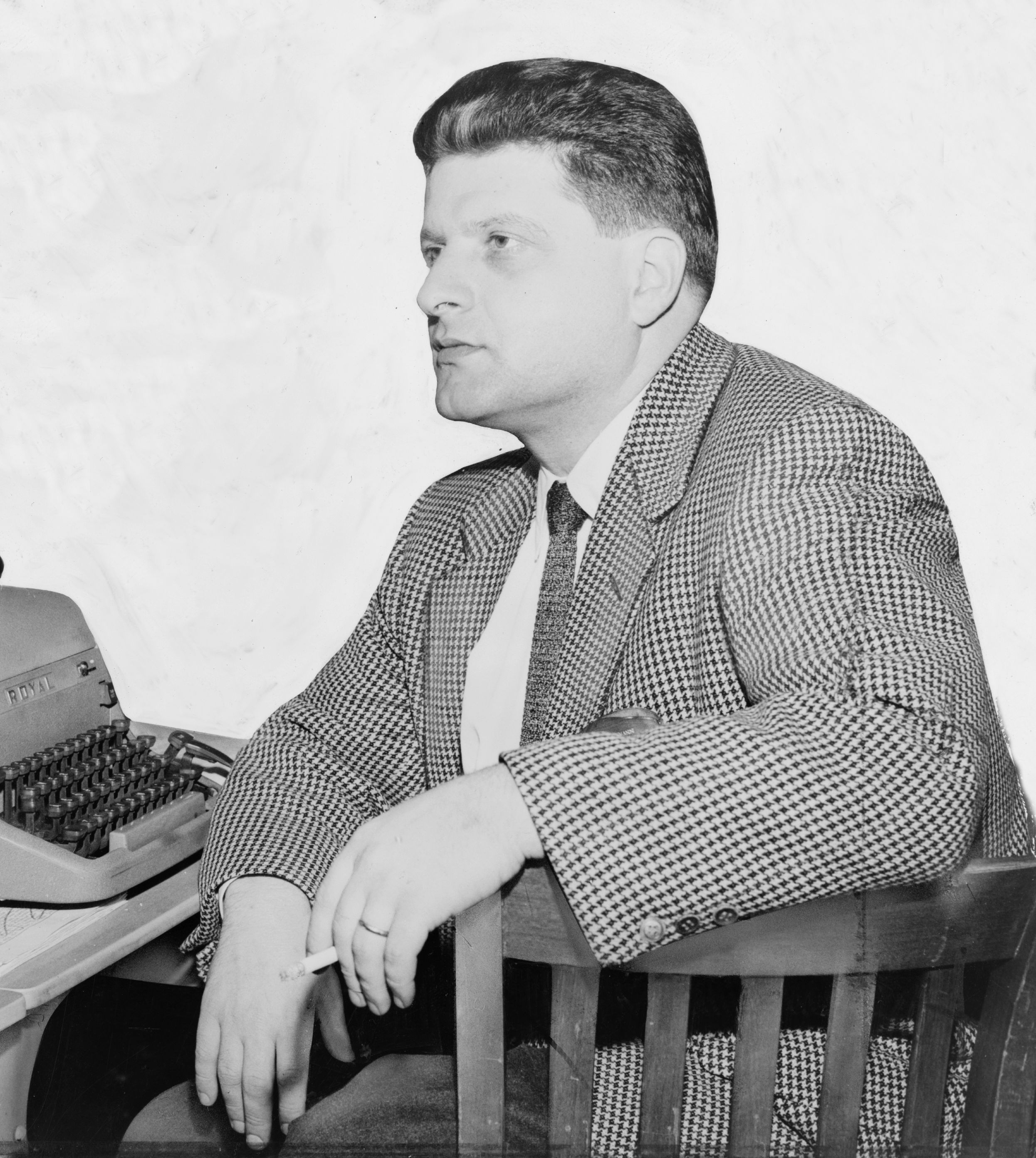
Paddy Chayefsky won for Marty (1955).

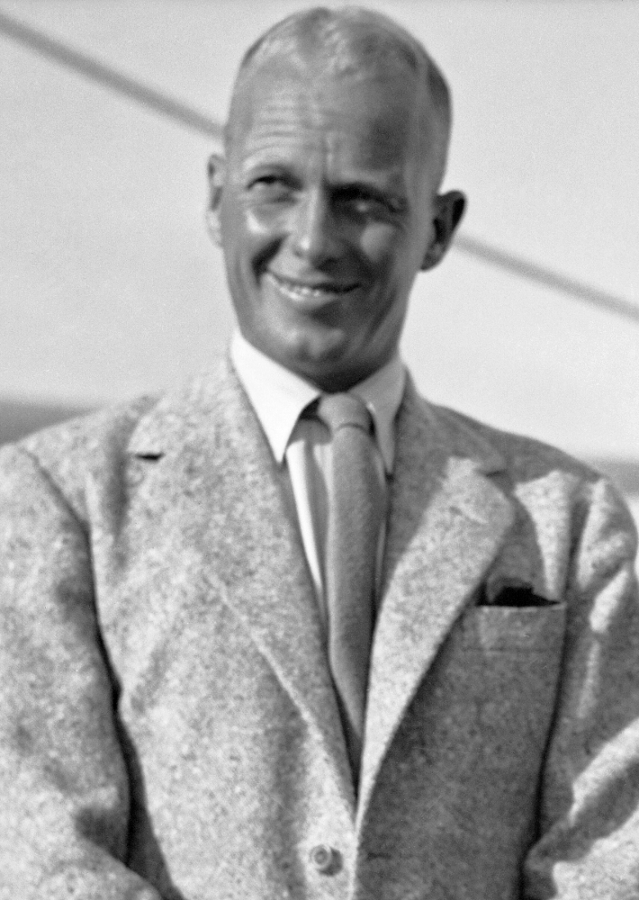
John Farrow co-won for Around the World in 80 Days (1956).

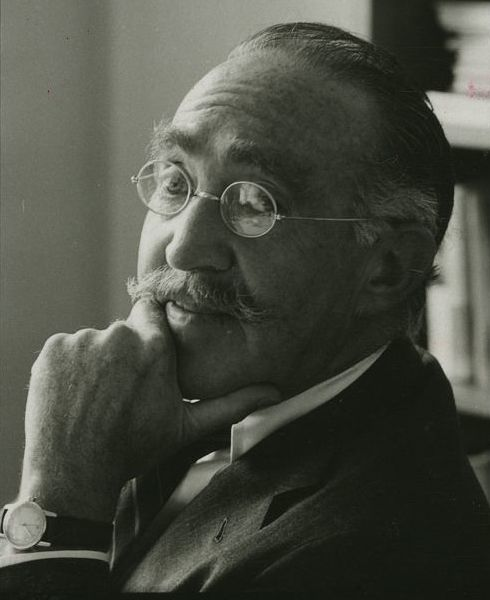
S. J. Perelman co-won for Around the World in 80 Days (1956).

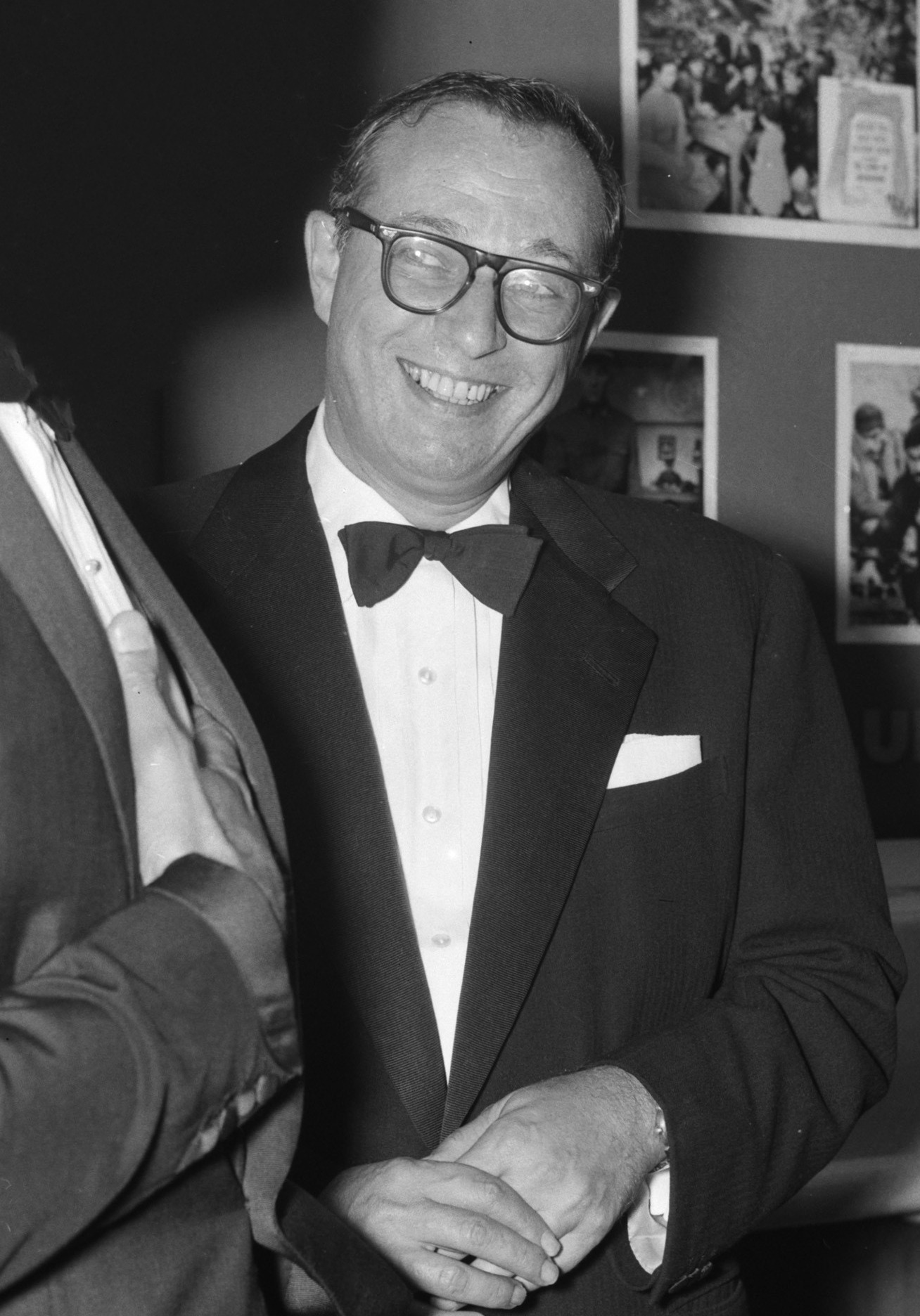
Carl Foreman co-won for The Bridge on the River Kwai (1957).

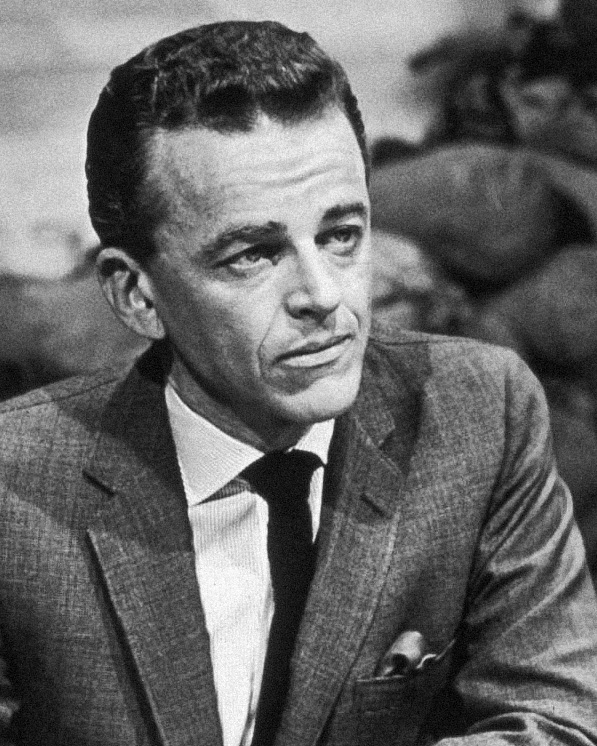
Alan Jay Lerner won for Gigi (1958).

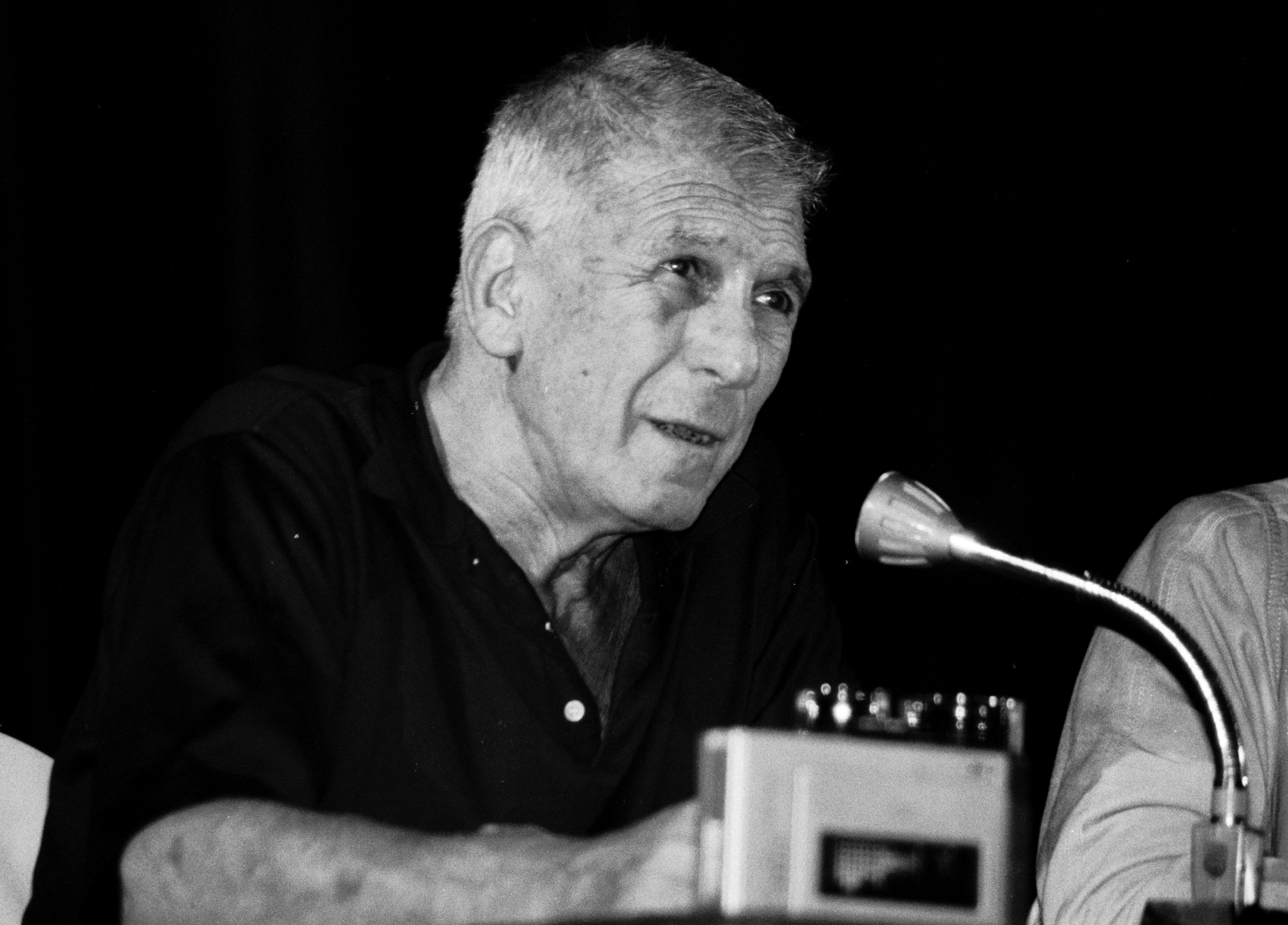
Richard Brooks won for Elmer Gantry (1960).

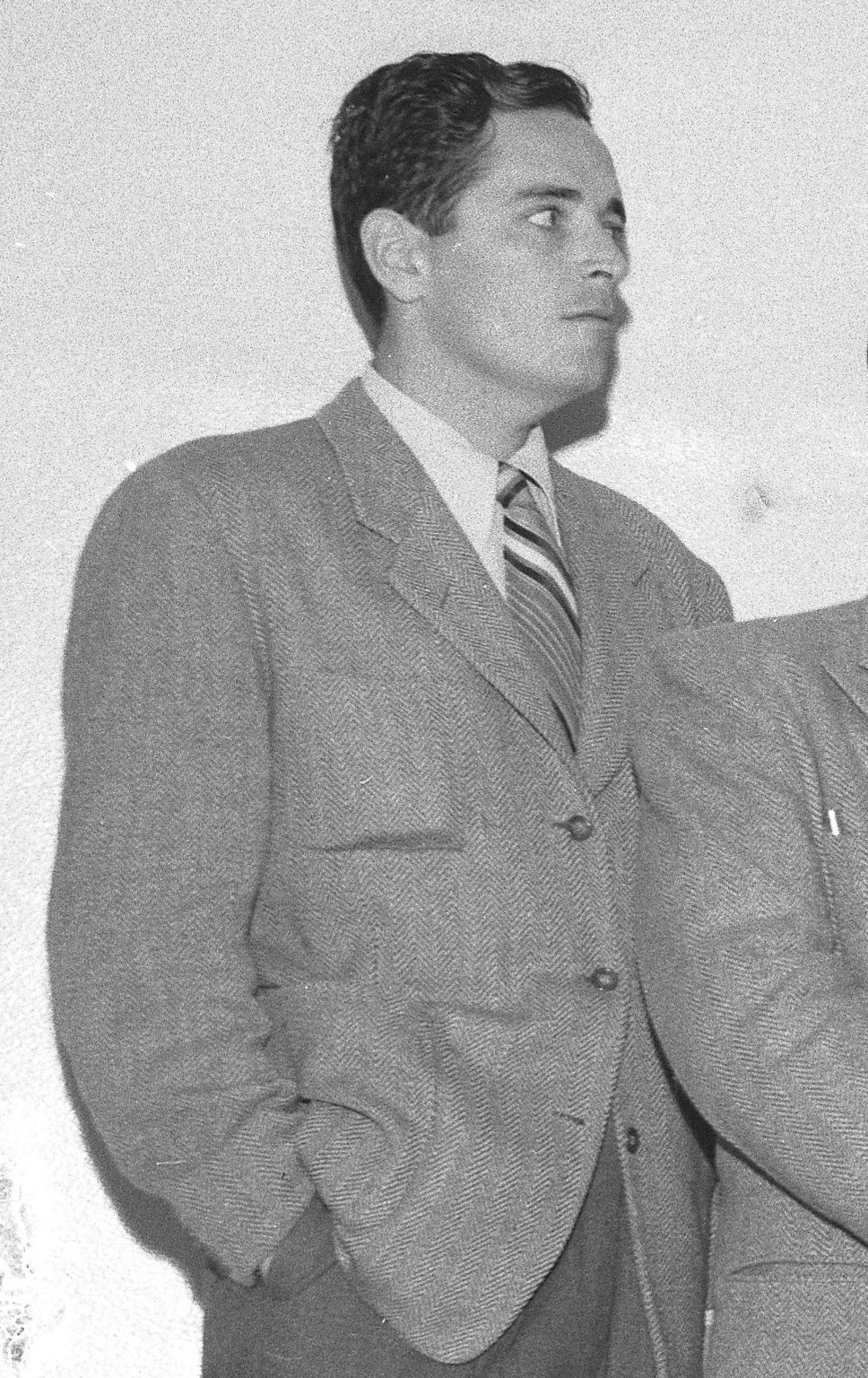
Ring Lardner Jr. won for M*A*S*H (1970).

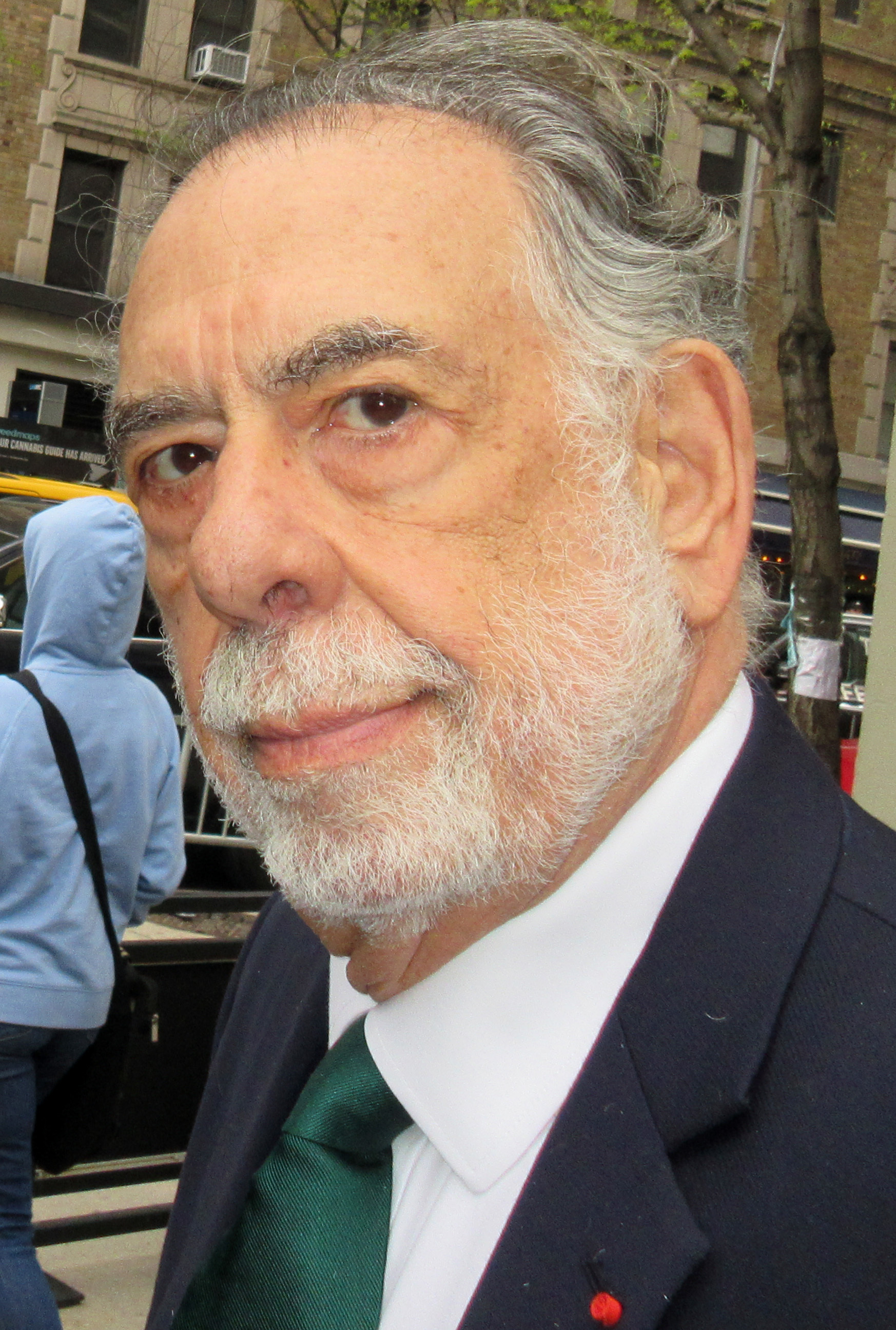
Francis Ford Coppola co-won the award twice, first for The Godfather (1972) and then for The Godfather Part II (1974).

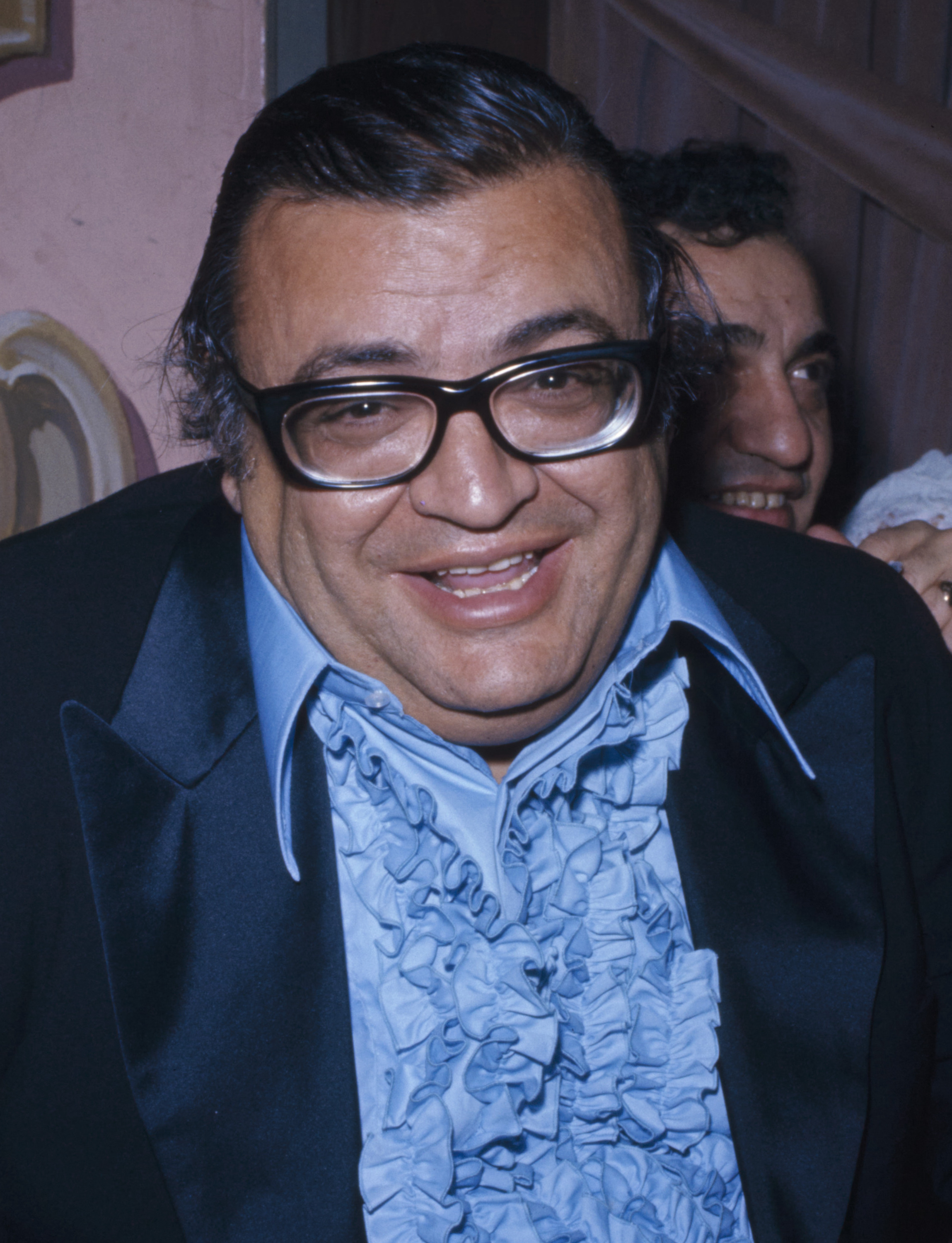
Mario Puzo co-won the award twice, first for The Godfather (1972) and then for The Godfather Part II (1974).

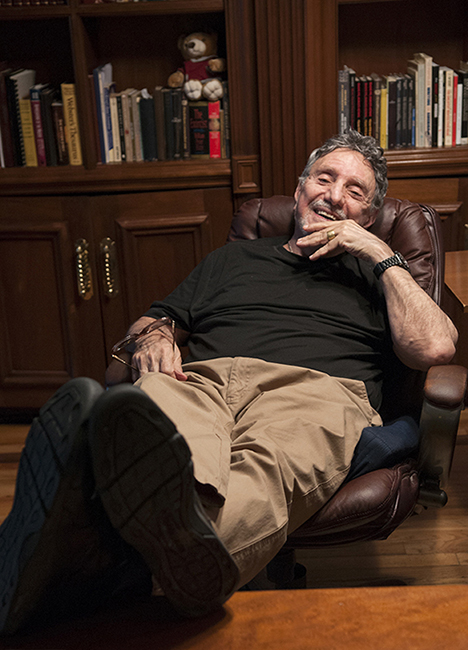
William Peter Blatty won for The Exorcist (1973), an adaptation of his novel of the same name.

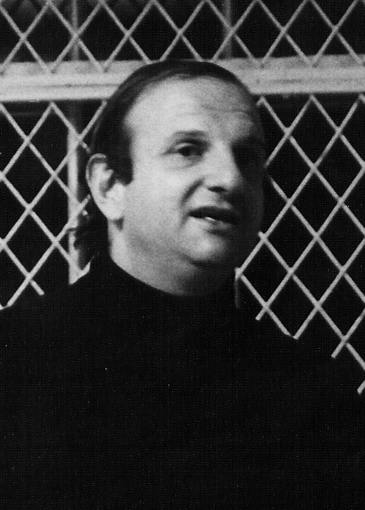
Bo Goldman co-won for One Flew Over the Cuckoo's Nest (1975).

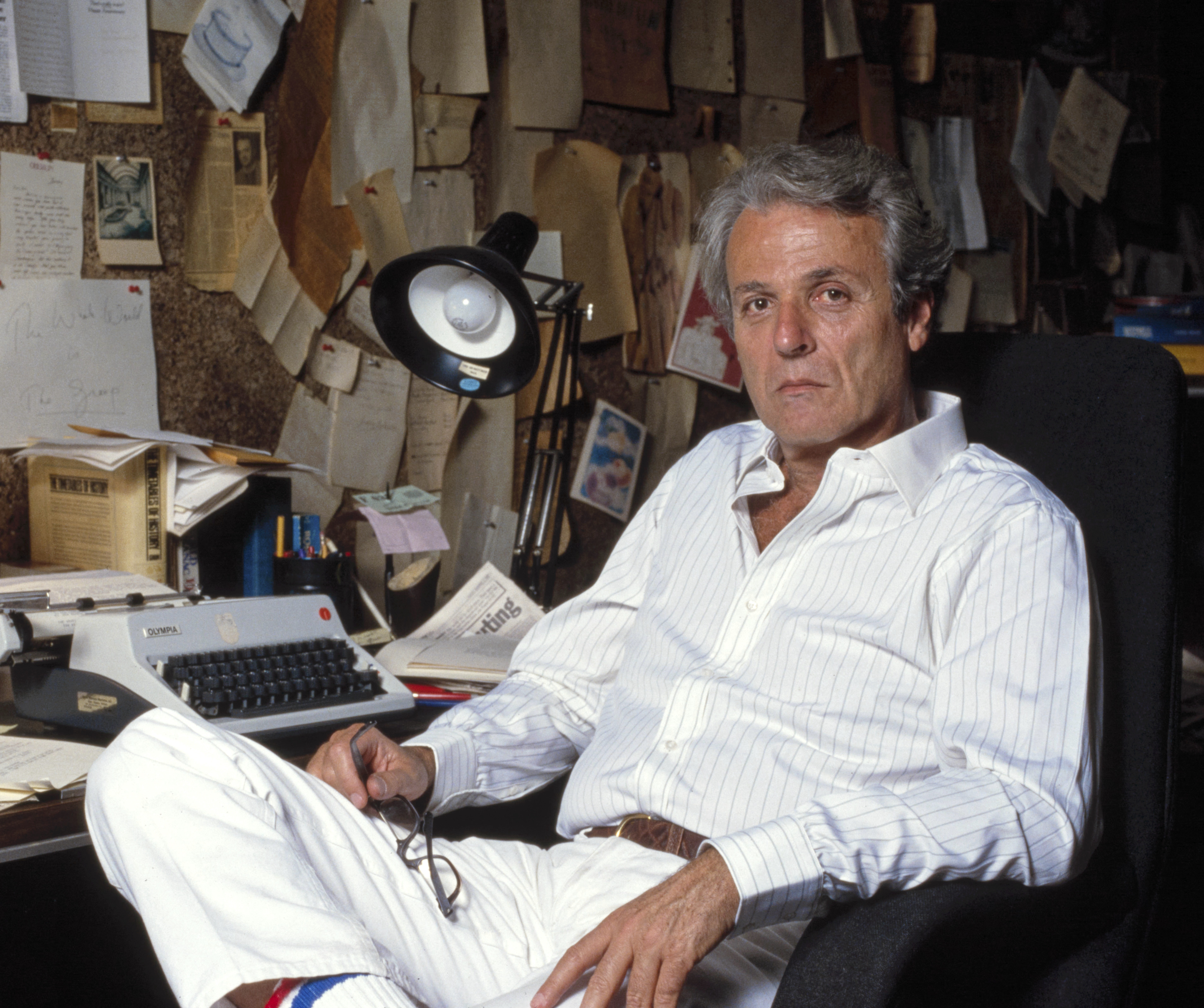
William Goldman won for All the President's Men (1976).

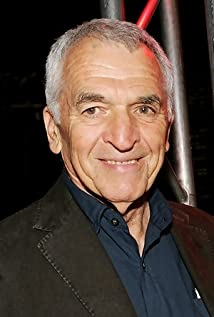
Alvin Sargent won the award twice, first for Julia (1977) and then for Ordinary People (1980).

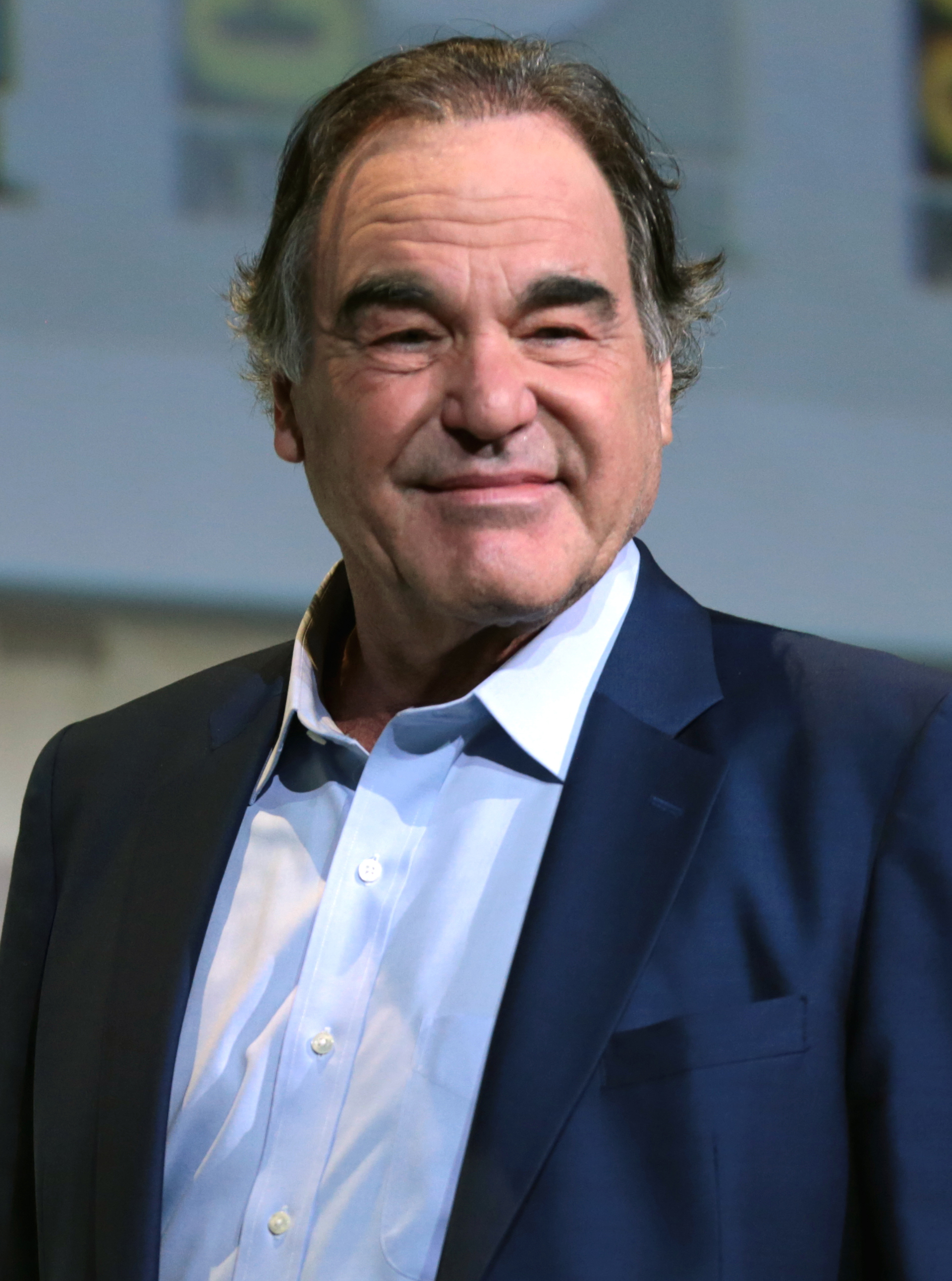
Oliver Stone won for Midnight Express (1978).

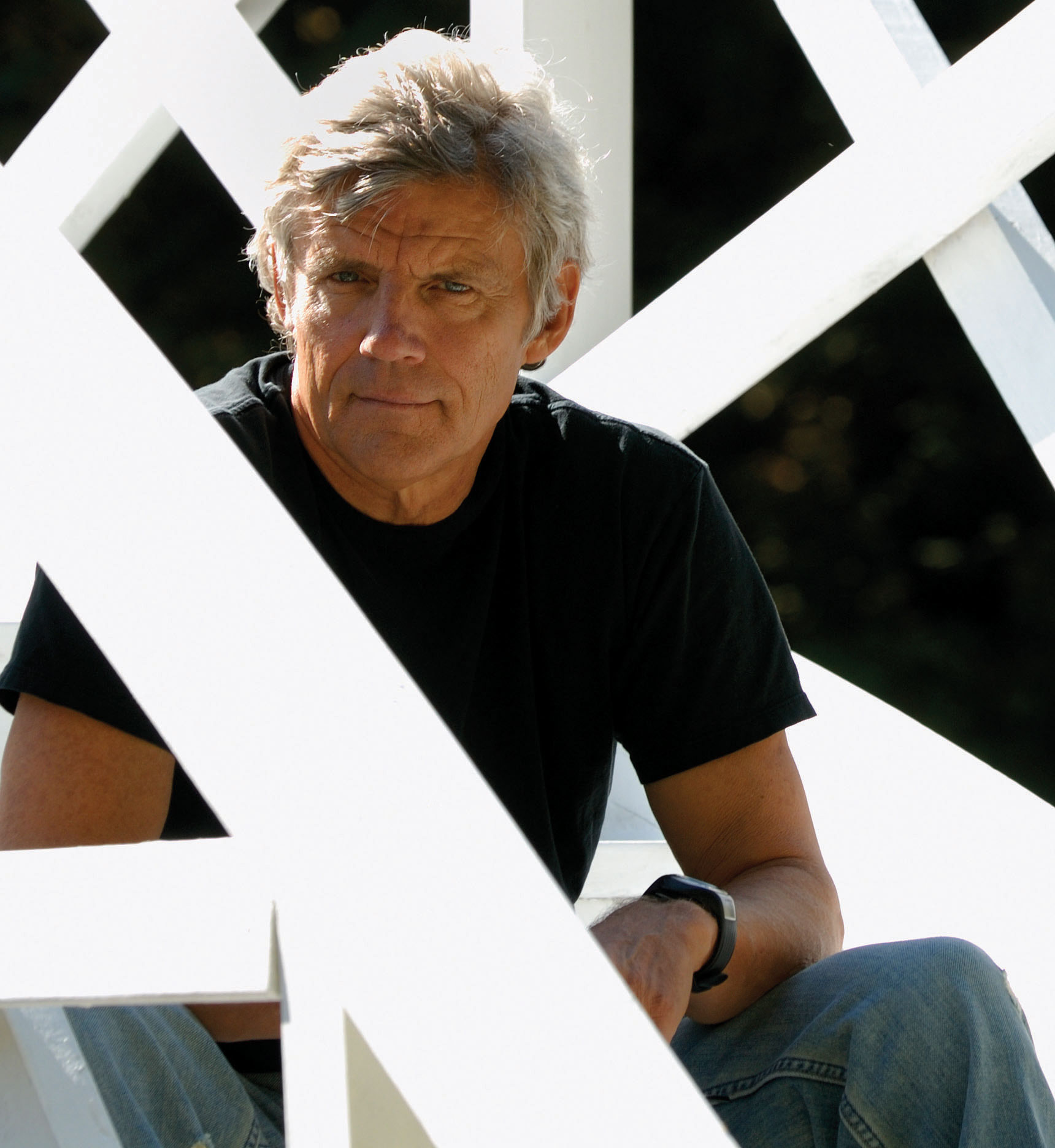
Ernest Thompson won for On Golden Pond (1981), an adaptation of his play of the same name.

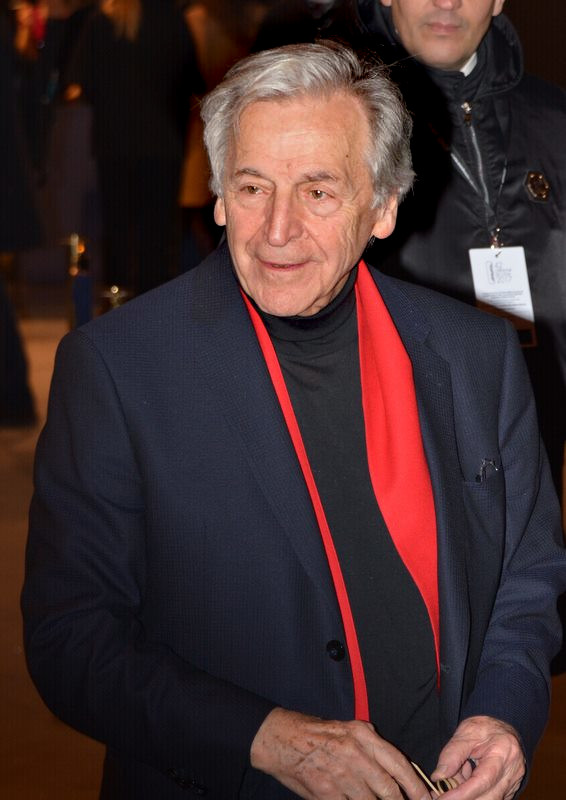
Costa-Gavras co-won for Missing (1982).

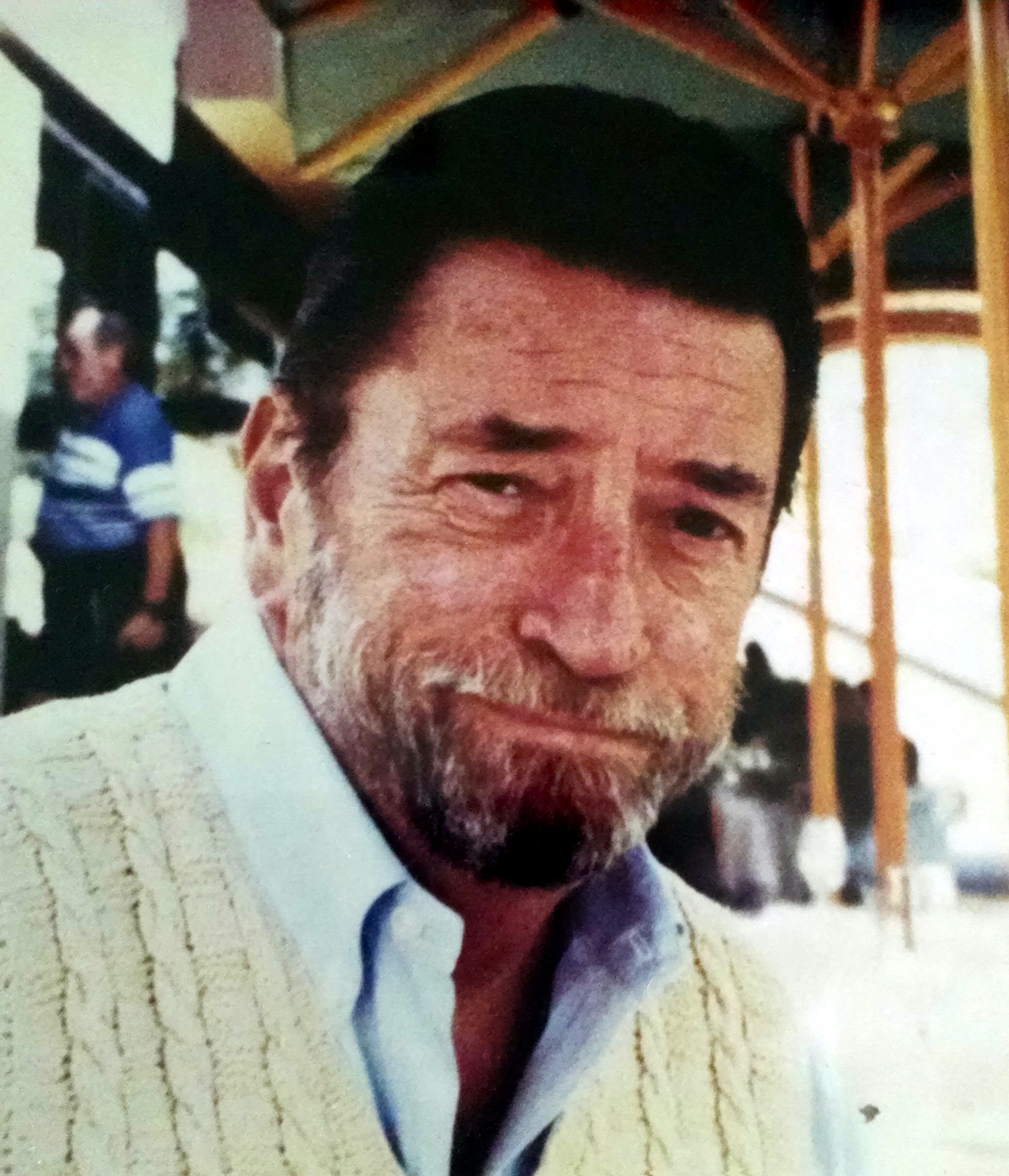
Donald E. Stewart co-won for Missing (1982).

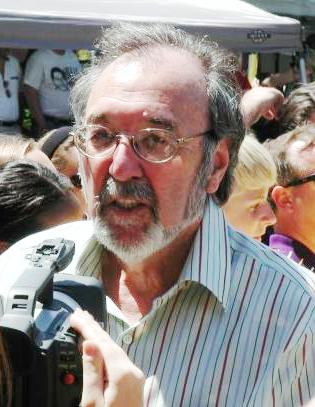
James L. Brooks won for Terms of Endearment (1983).

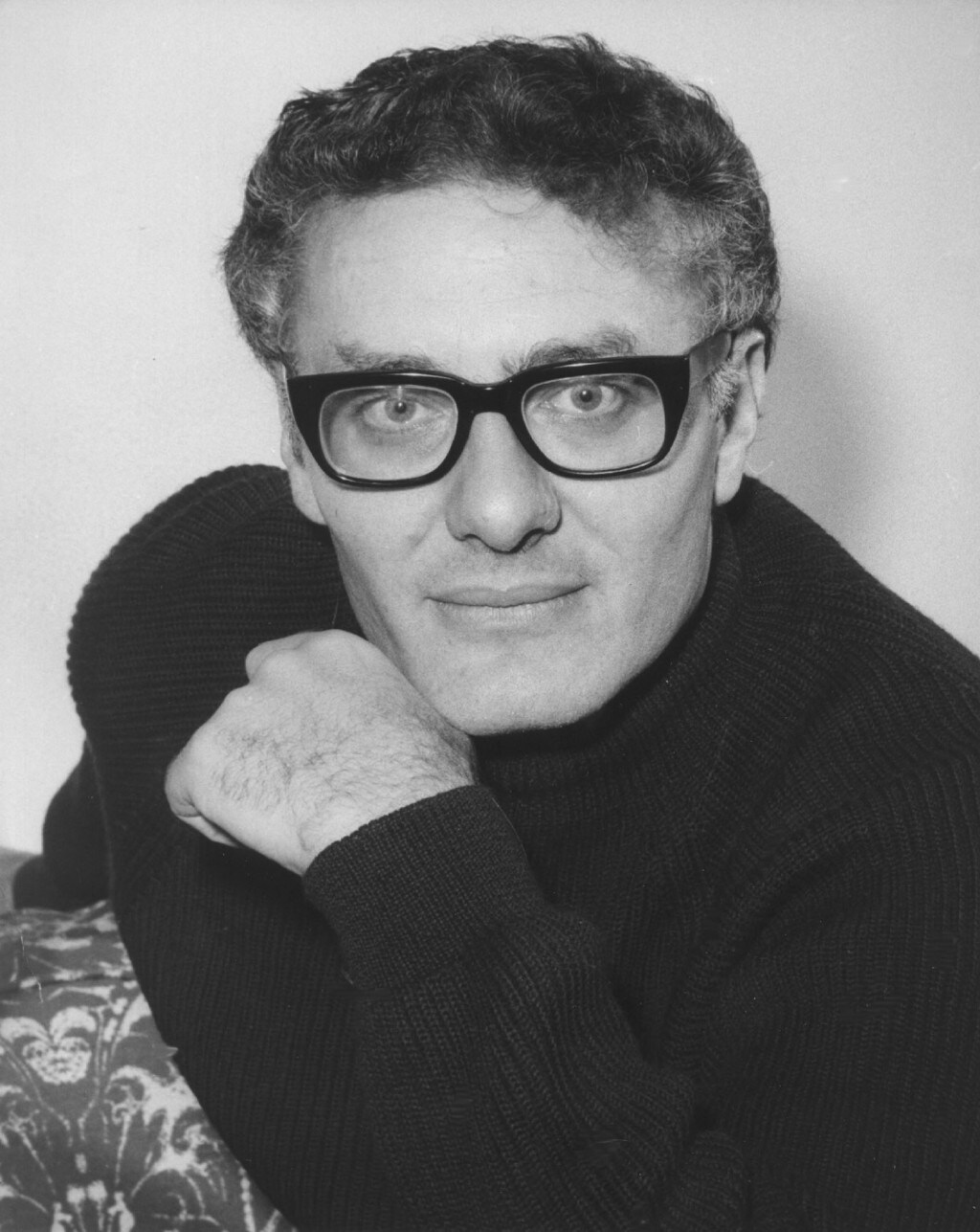
Peter Shaffer won for Amadeus (1984).

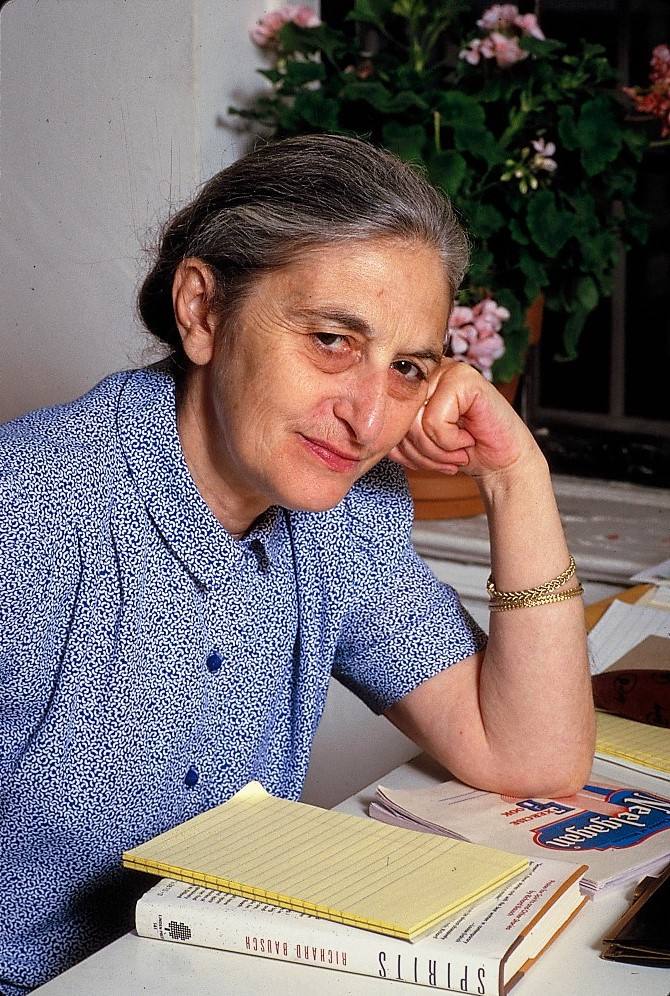
Ruth Prawer Jhabvala won the award twice, first for A Room with a View (1986) and then for Howards End (1992).

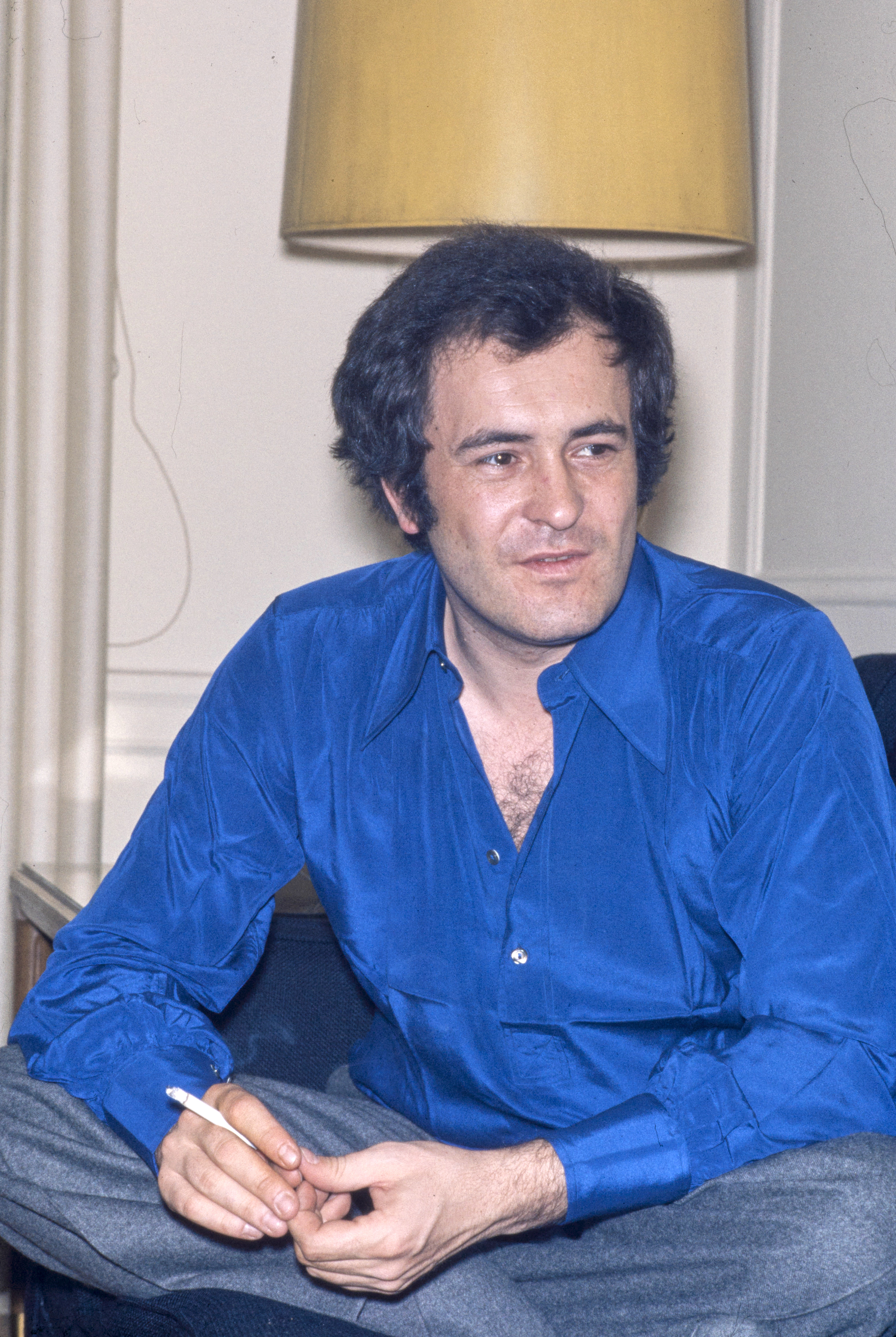
Bernardo Bertolucci co-won for The Last Emperor (1987).

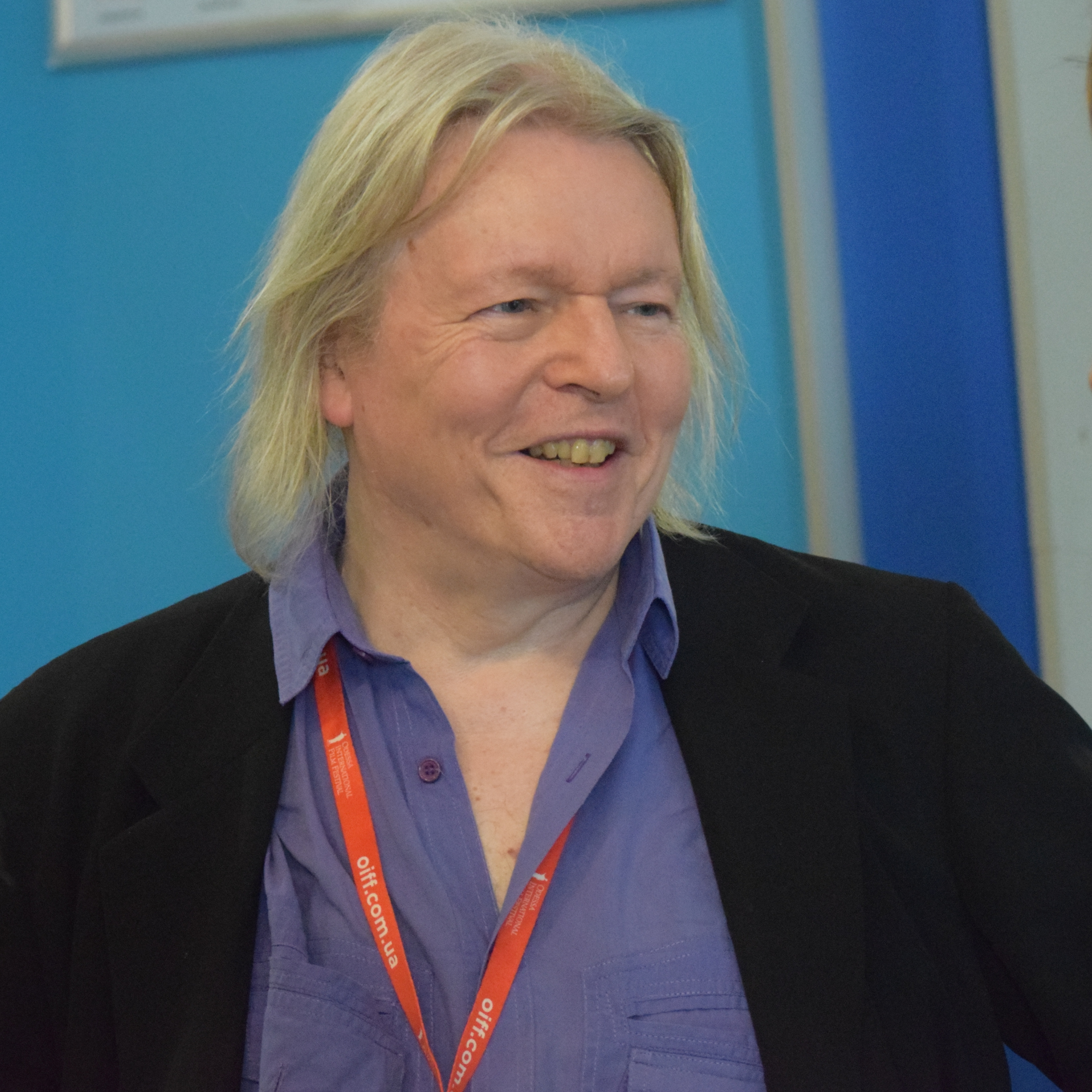
Christopher Hampton won the award twice, first as a solo writer for Dangerous Liaisons (1988) and then as a co-writer for The Father (2020).

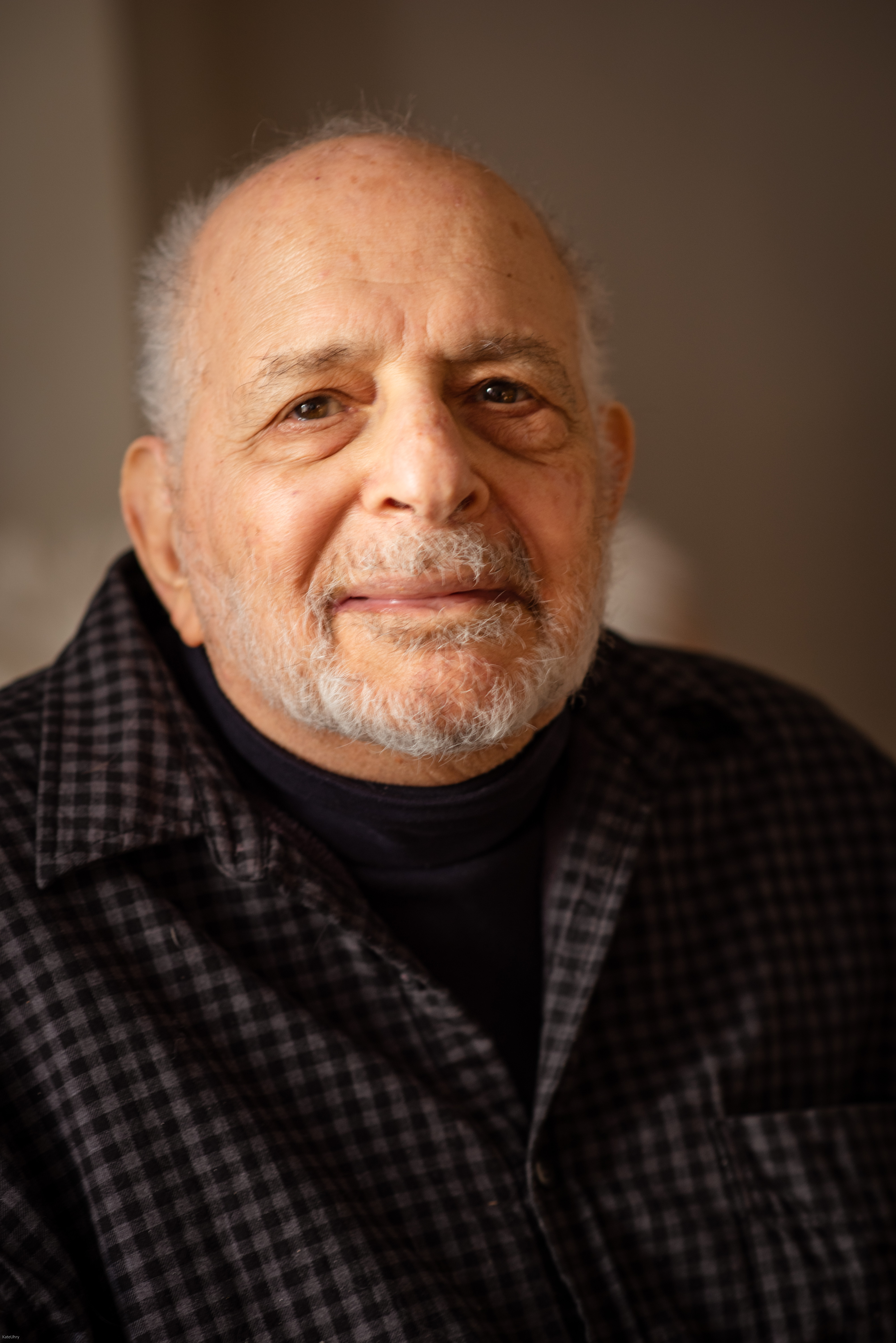
Alfred Uhry won for Driving Miss Daisy (1989), an adaptation of his play of the same name.

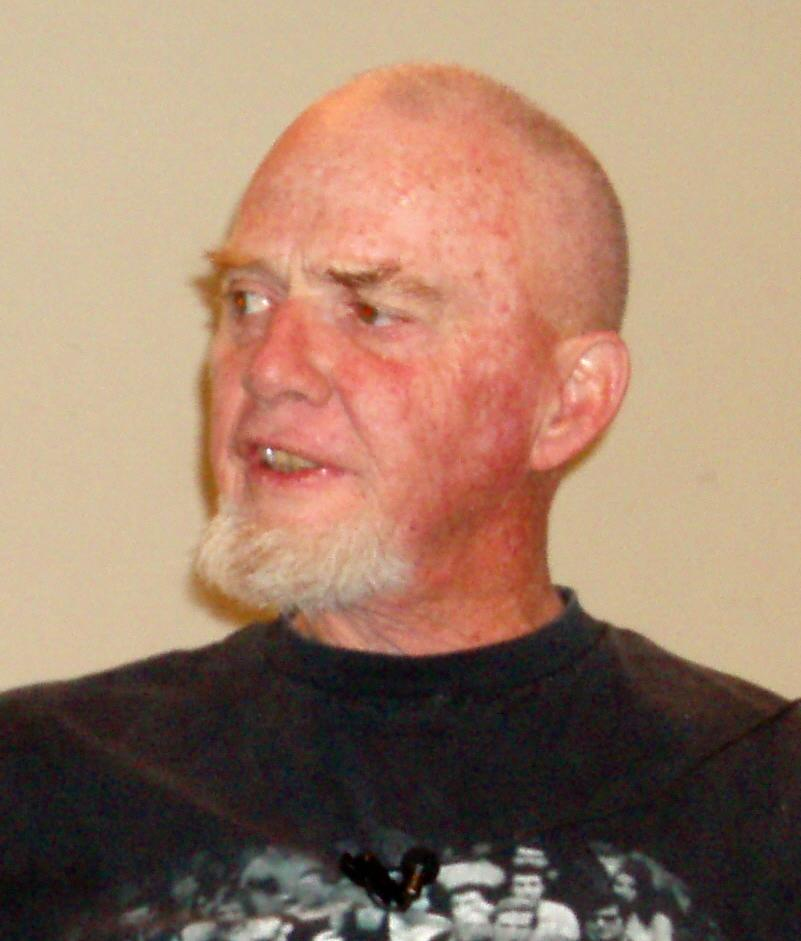
Michael Blake won for Dances with Wolves (1990), an adaptation of his novel of the same name.

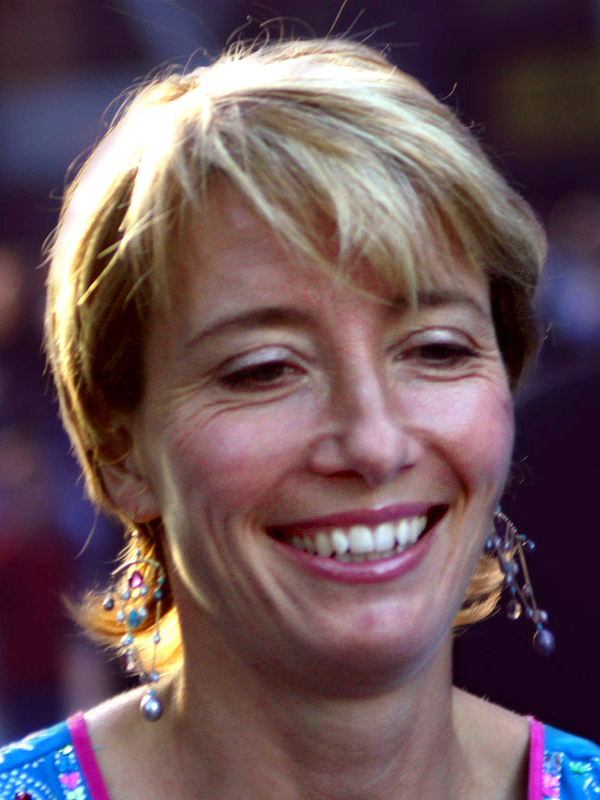
Emma Thompson won for Sense and Sensibility (1995).

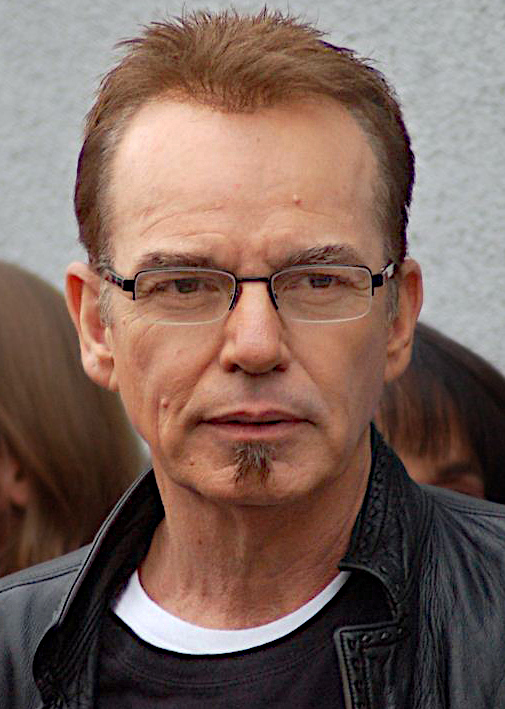
Billy Bob Thornton won for Sling Blade (1996).

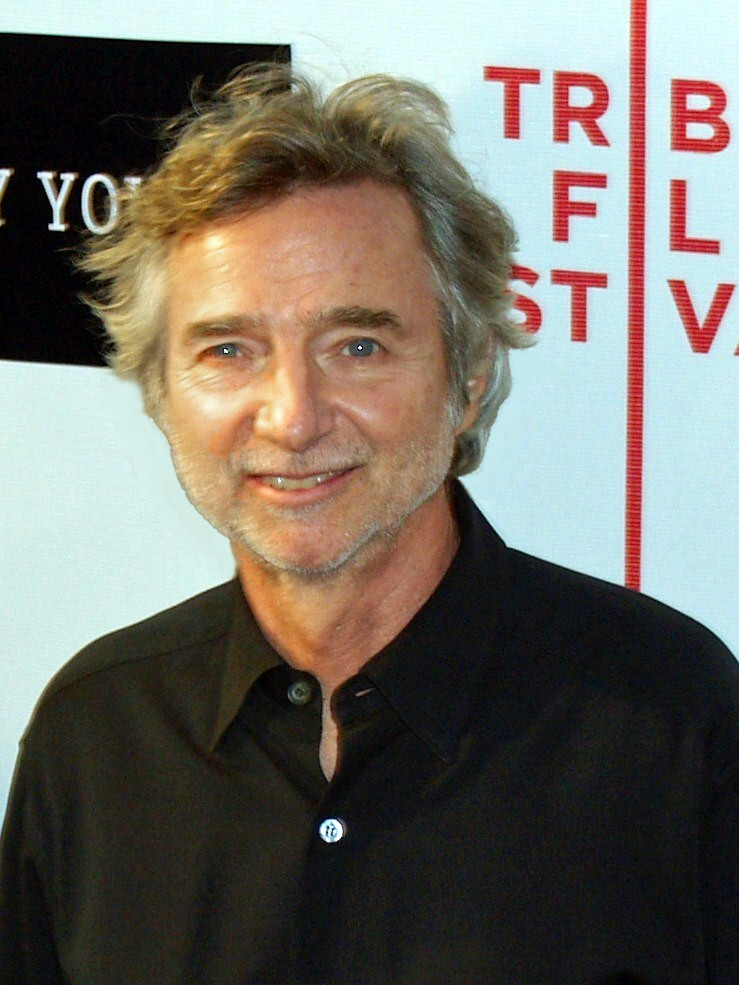
Curtis Hanson co-won for L.A. Confidential (1997).

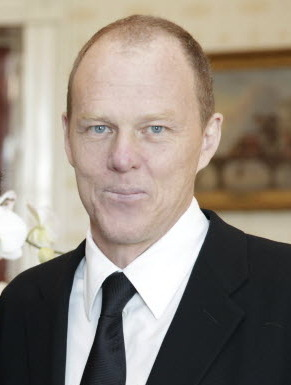
Brian Helgeland co-won for L.A. Confidential (1997).

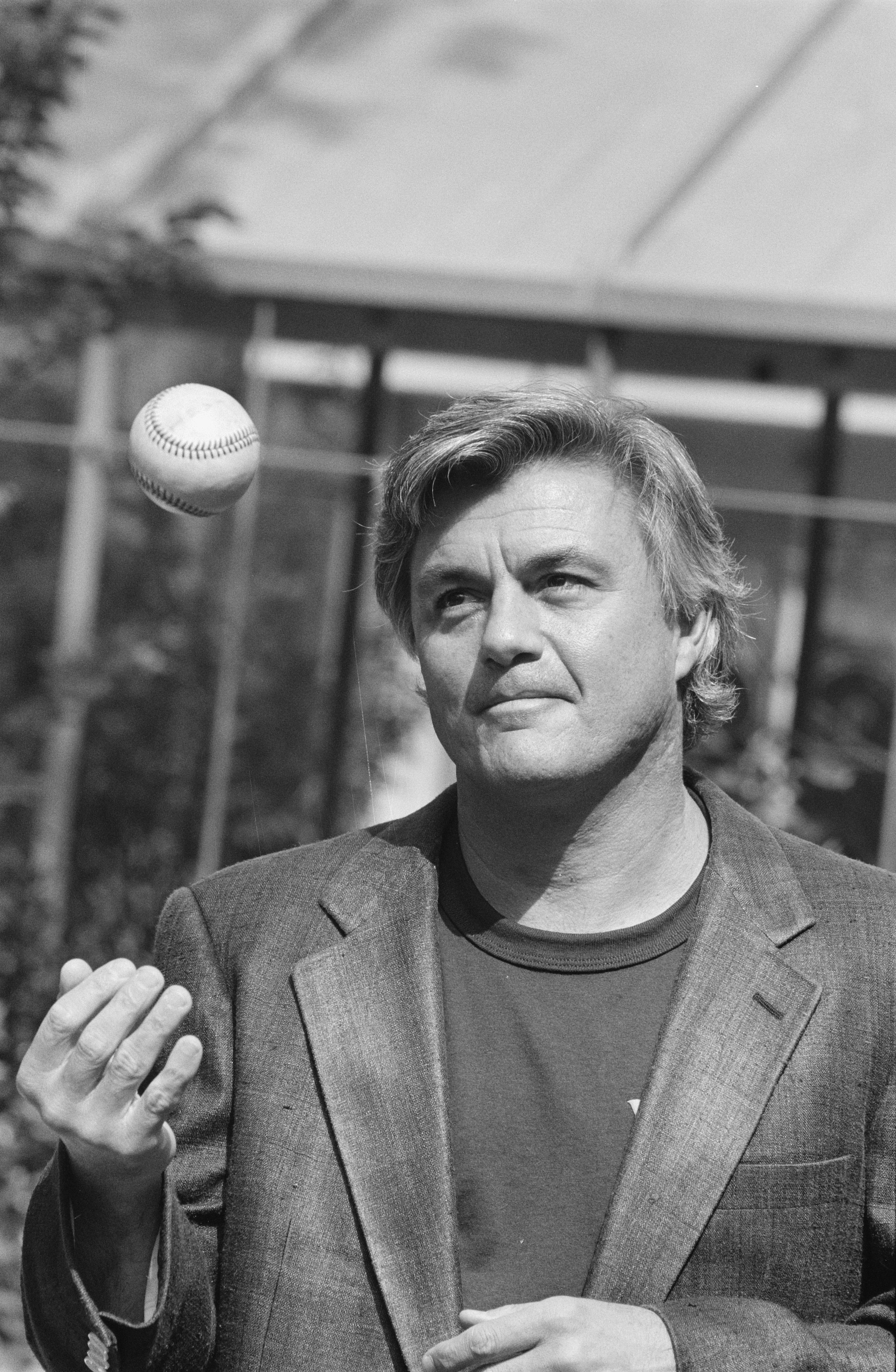
John Irving won for The Cider House Rules (1999), an adaptation of his novel of the same name.

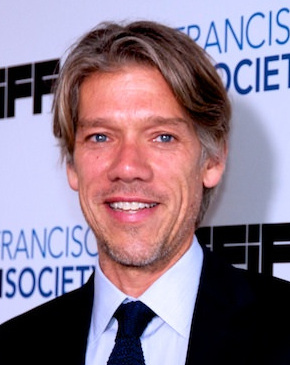
Stephen Gaghan won for Traffic (2000).

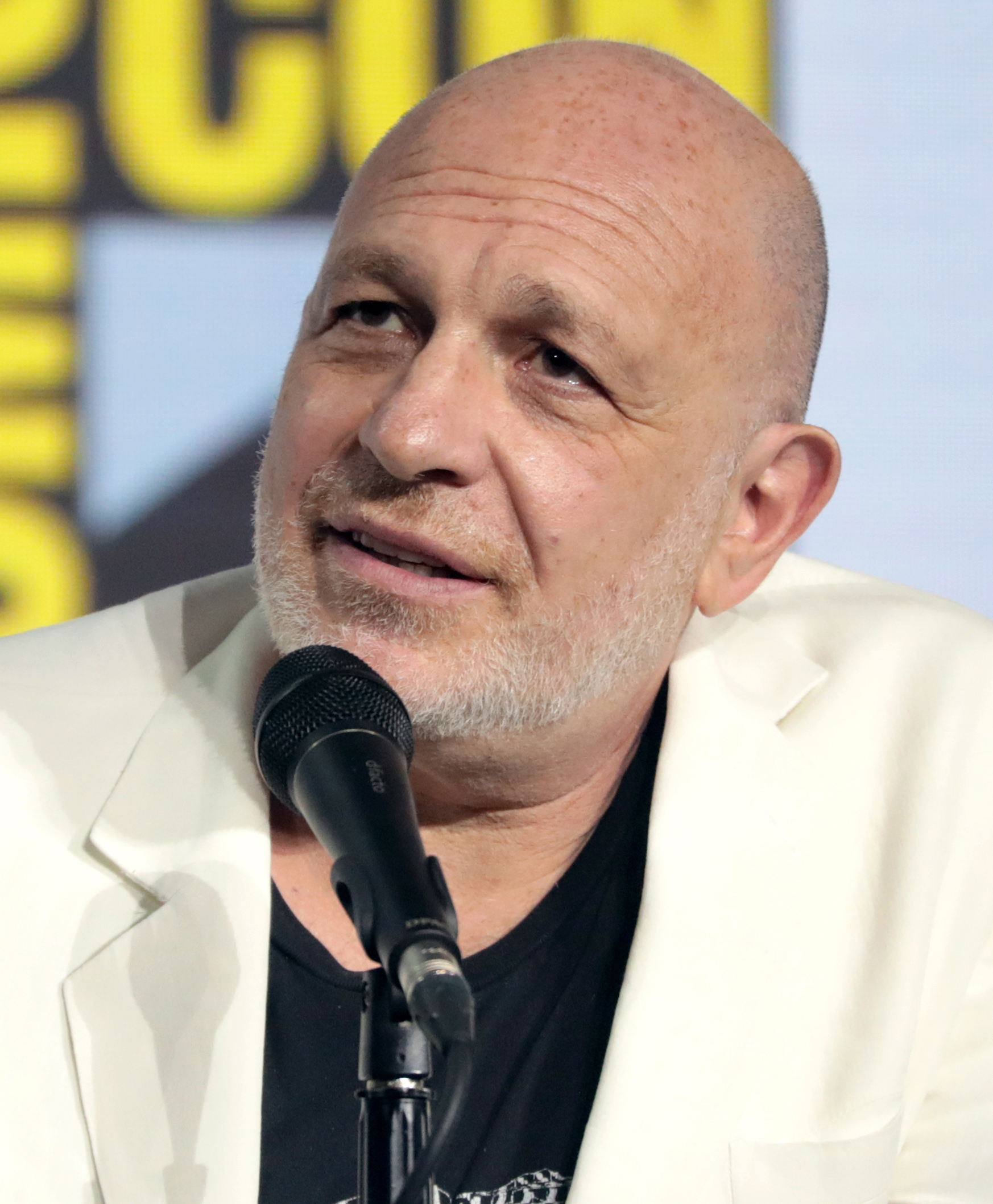
Akiva Goldsman won for A Beautiful Mind (2001).

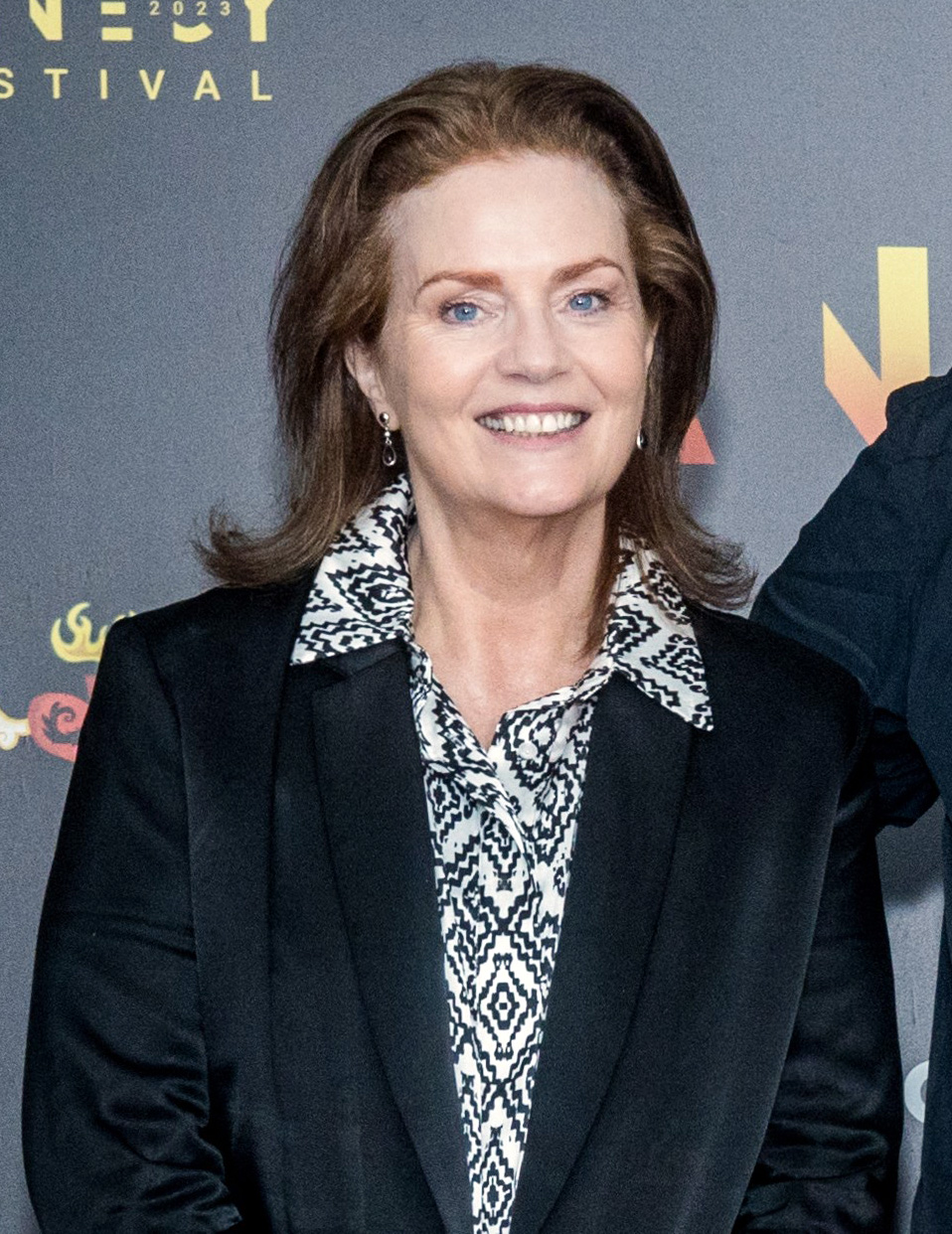
Philippa Boyens co-won for The Lord of the Rings: The Return of the King (2003).

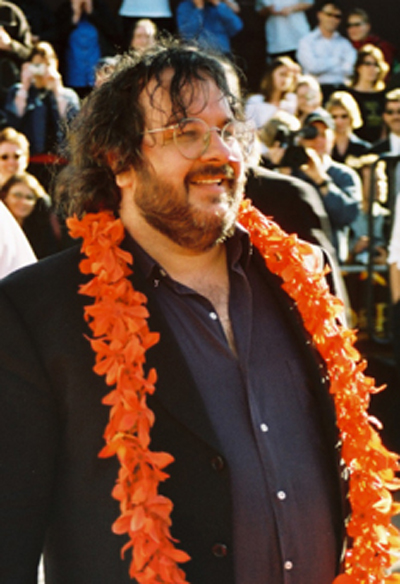
Peter Jackson co-won for The Lord of the Rings: The Return of the King (2003).

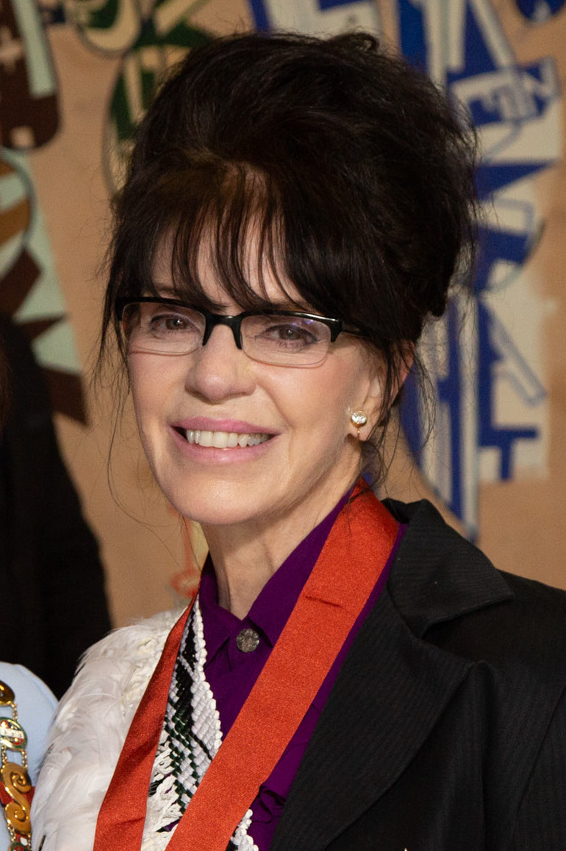
Fran Walsh co-won for The Lord of the Rings: The Return of the King (2003).

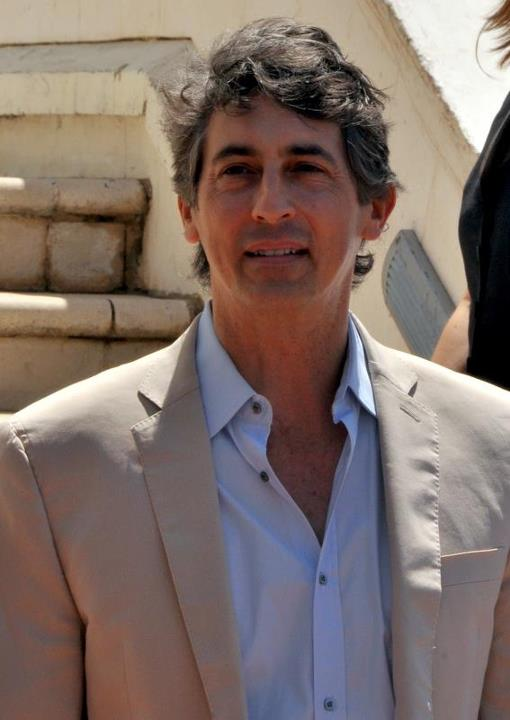
Alexander Payne co-won the award twice, first for Sideways (2004) and then for The Descendants (2011).

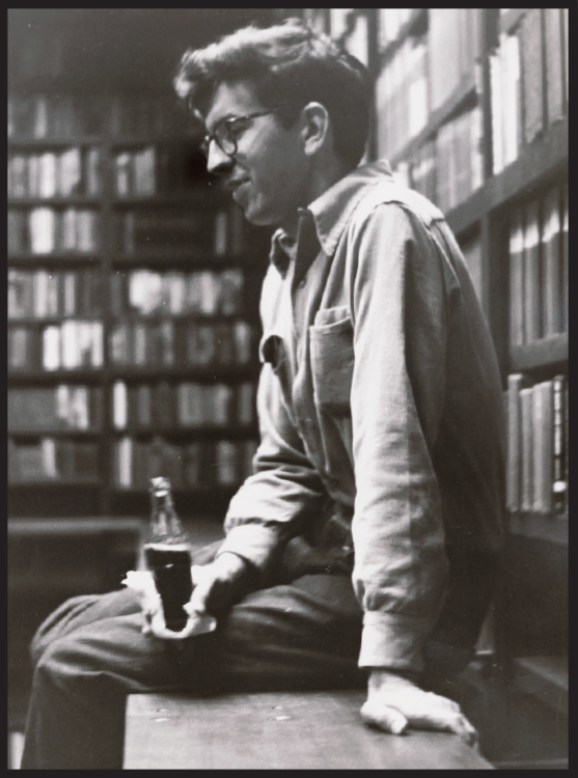
Larry McMurtry co-won for Brokeback Mountain (2005).

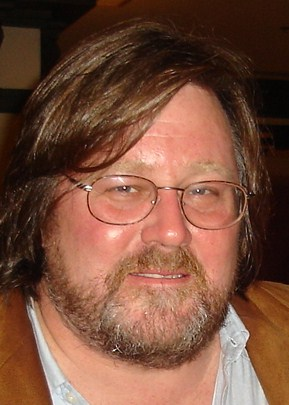
William Monahan won for The Departed (2006).

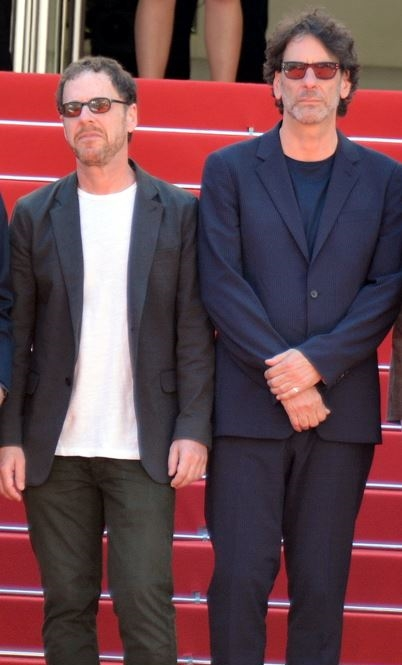
The Coen brothers won for No Country for Old Men (2007).

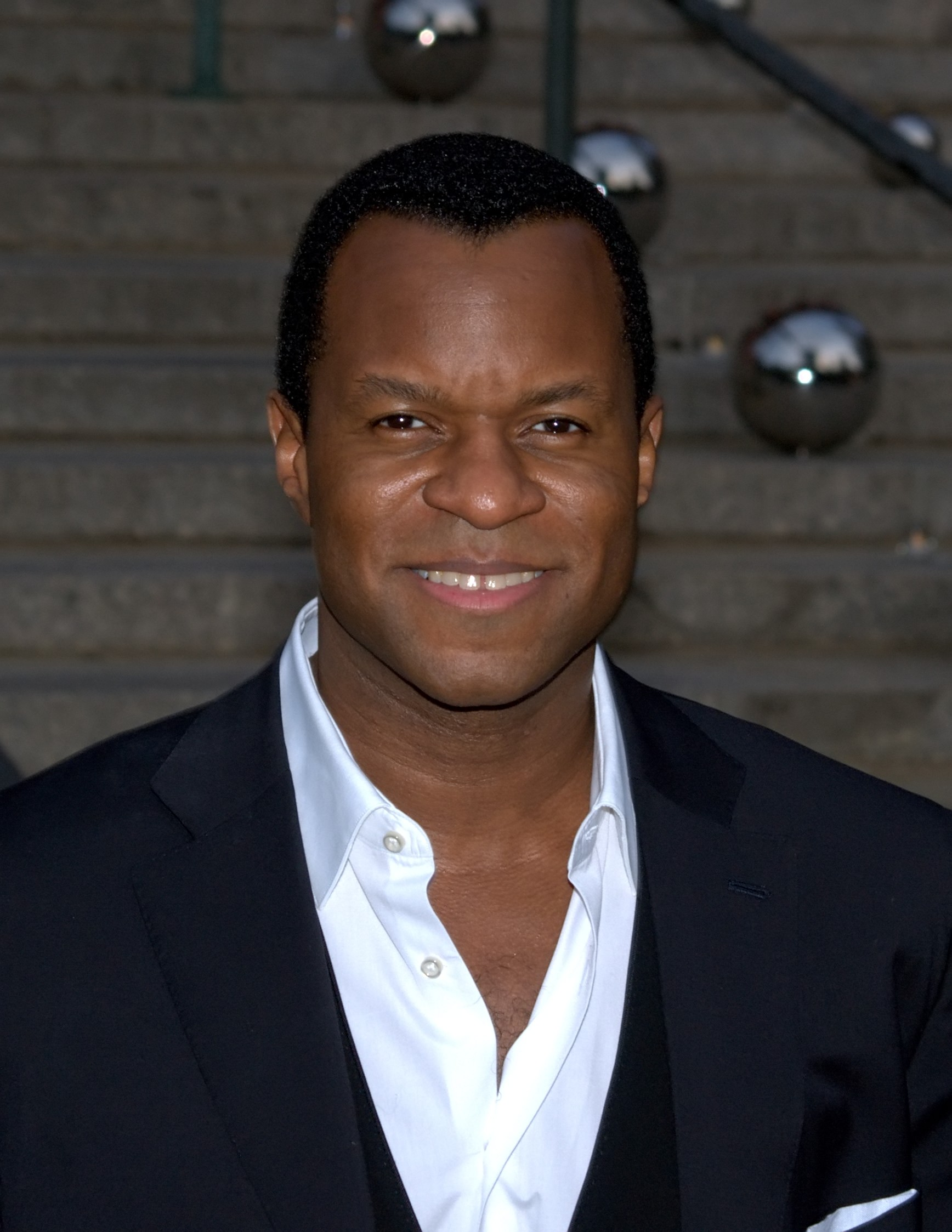
Geoffrey S. Fletcher won for Precious (2009); first Black winner in this category.

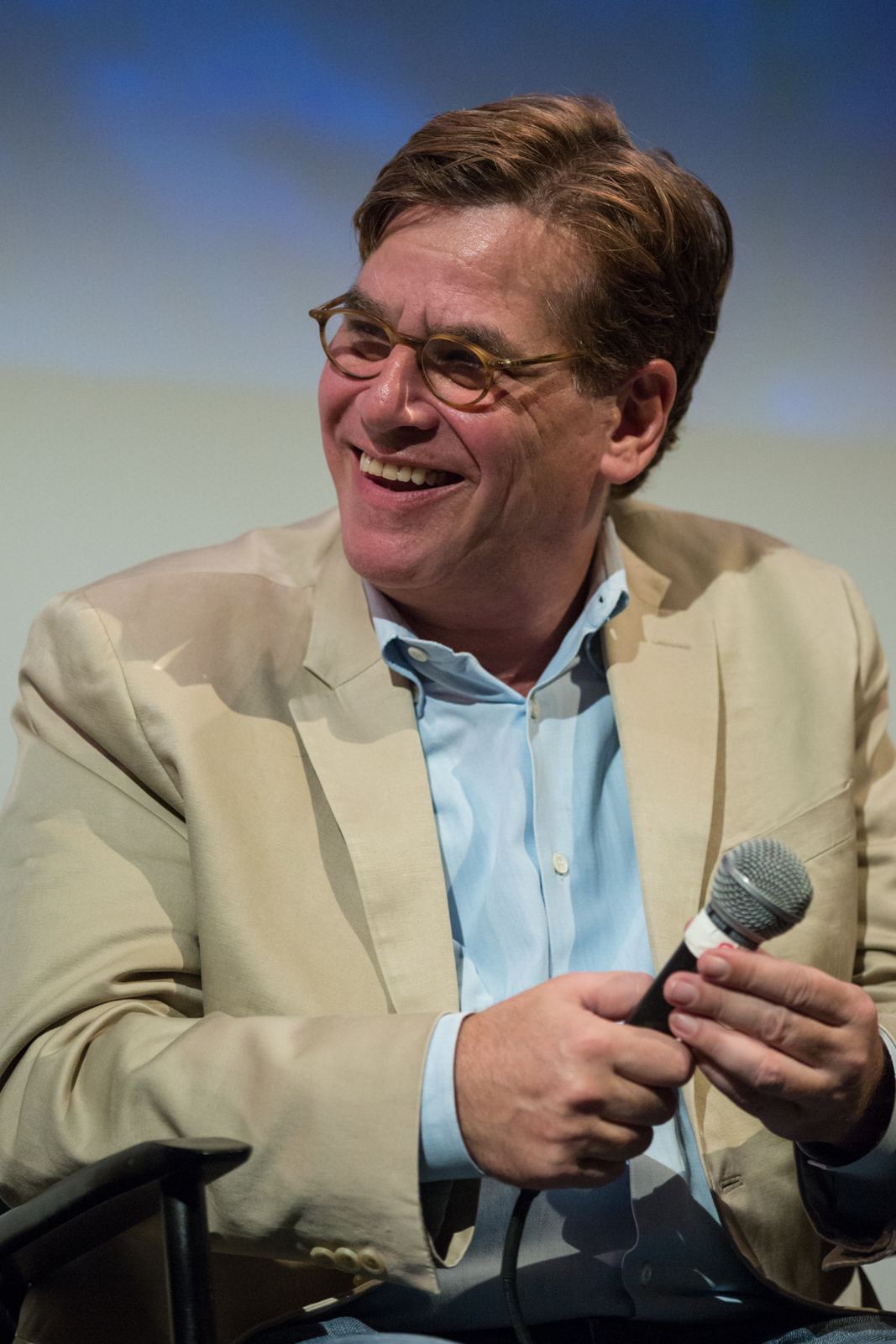
Aaron Sorkin won for The Social Network (2010).

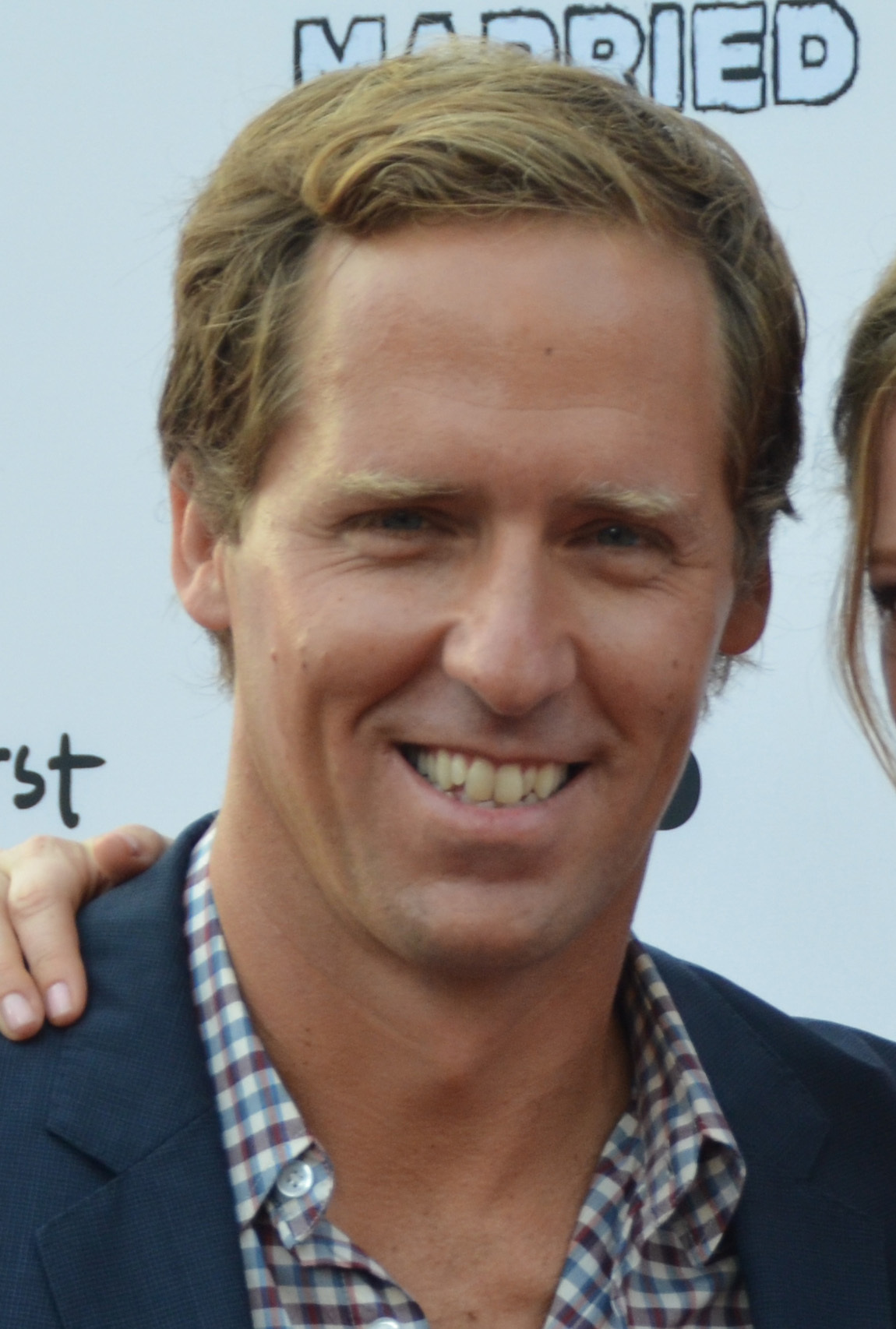
Nat Faxon co-won for The Descendants (2011).

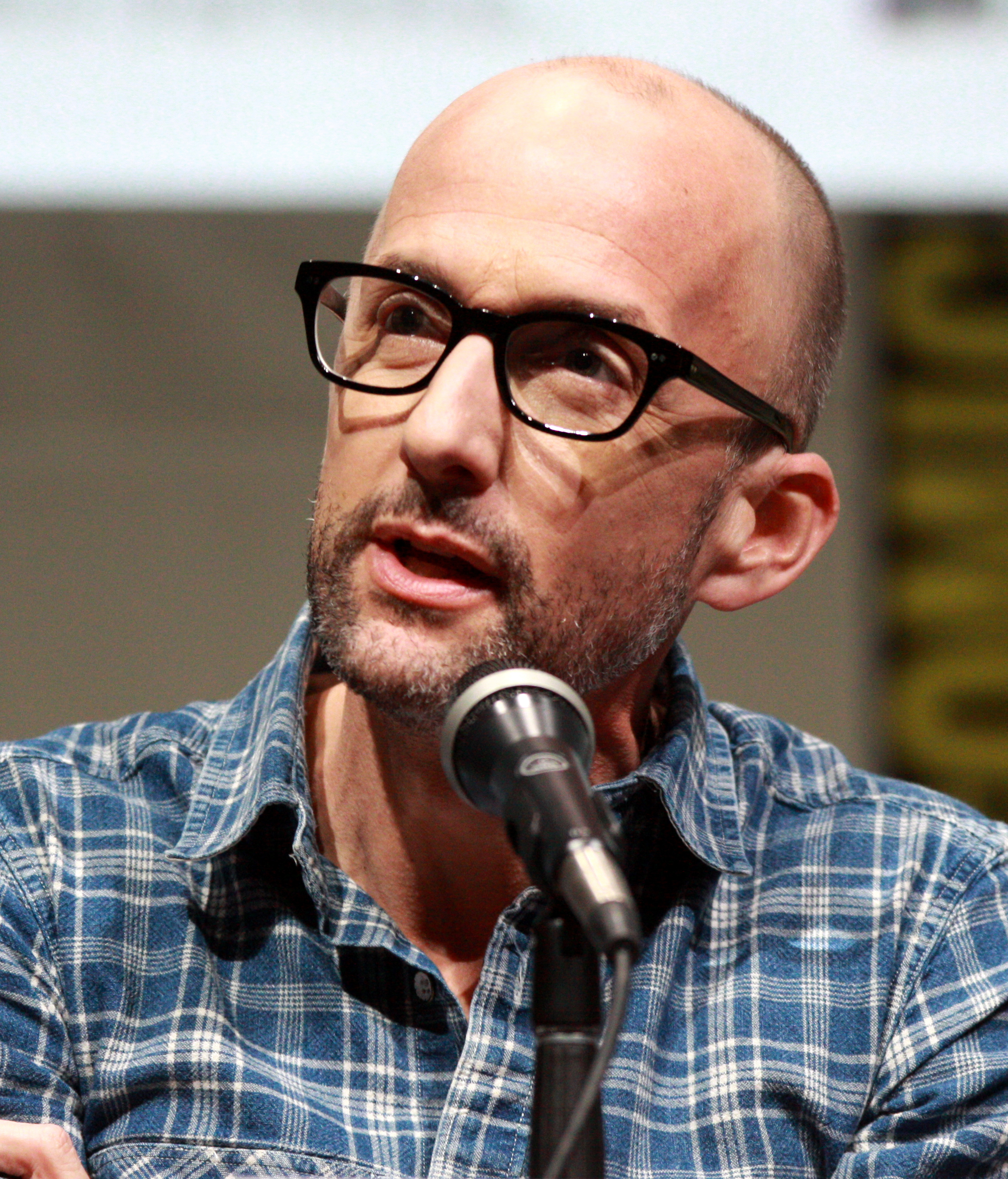
Jim Rash co-won for The Descendants (2011).

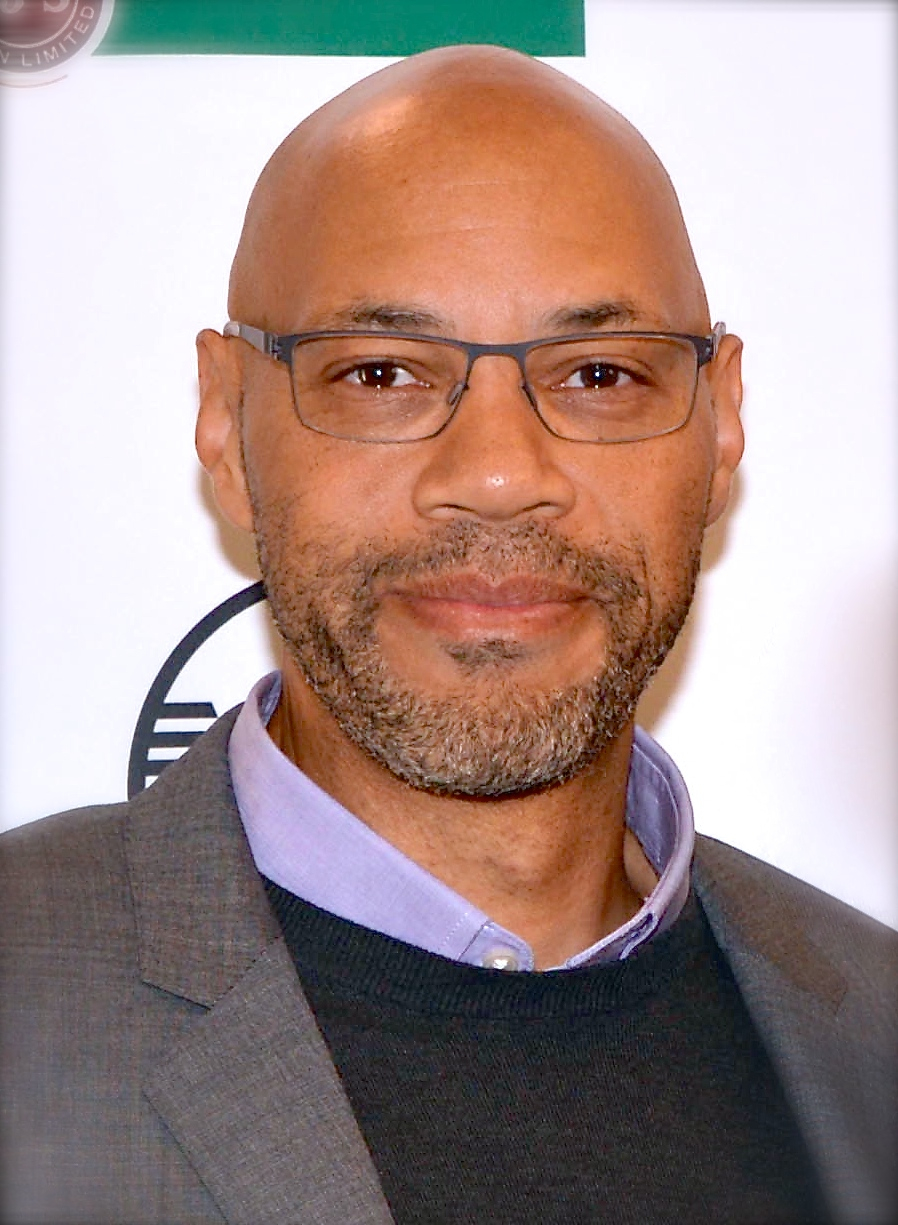
John Ridley won for 12 Years a Slave (2013).

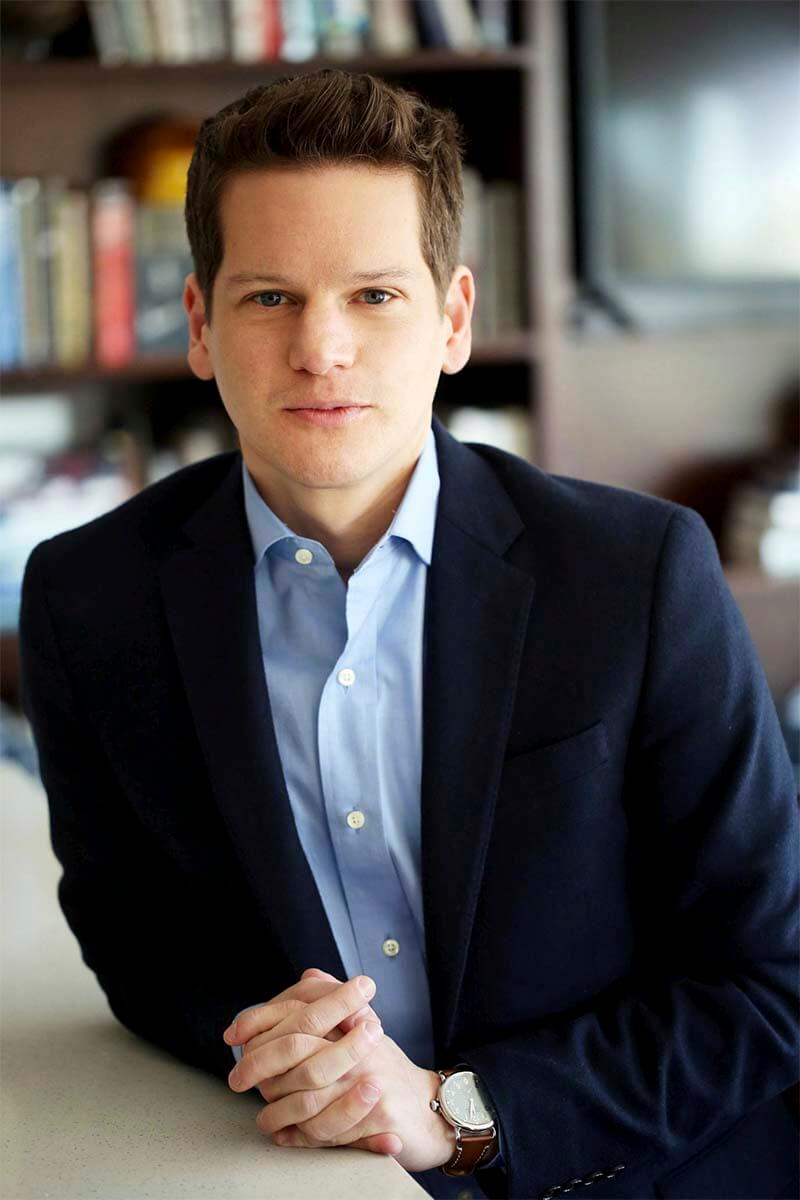
Graham Moore won for The Imitation Game (2014).

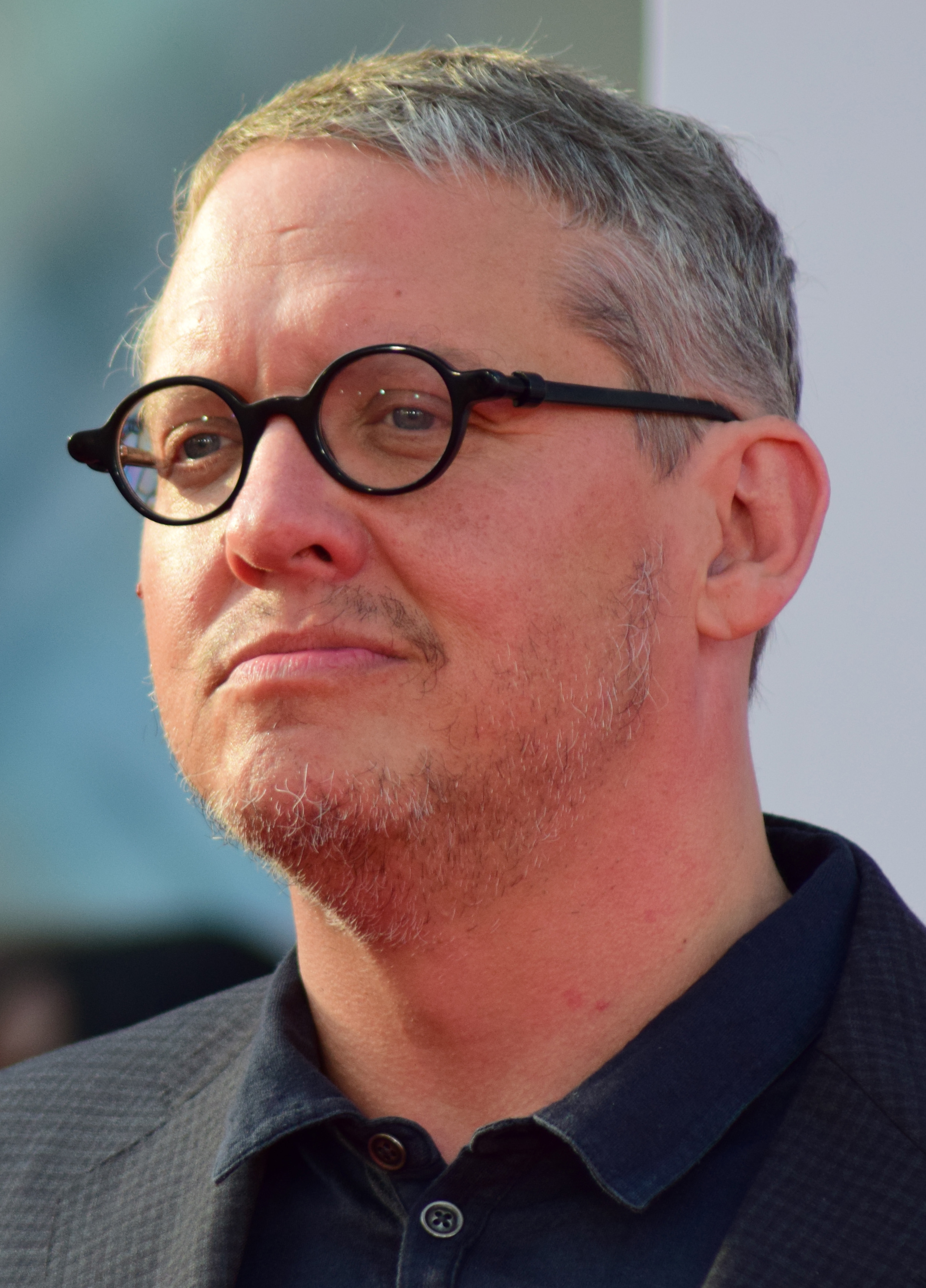
Adam McKay co-won for The Big Short (2015).

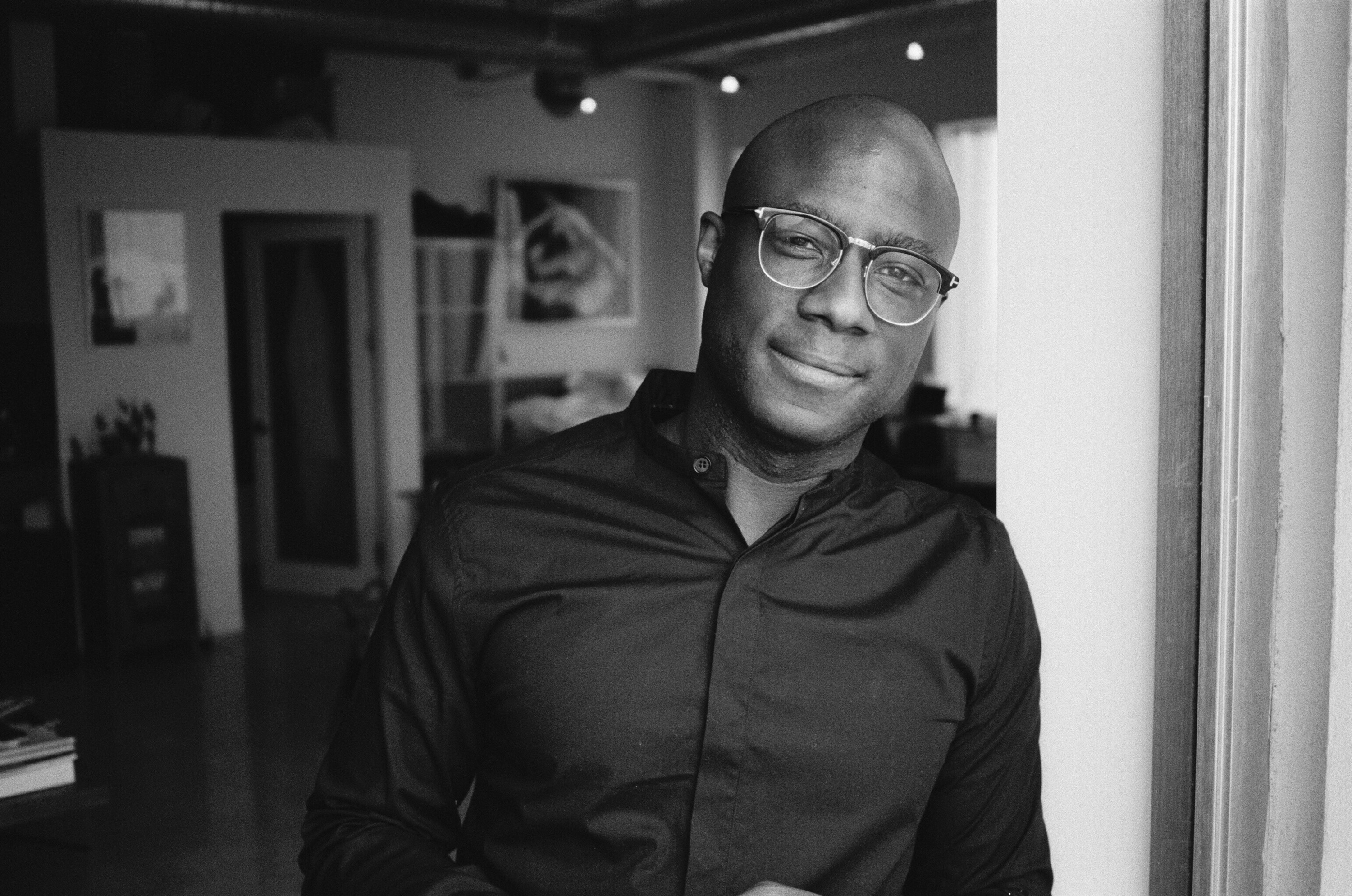
Barry Jenkins co-won for Moonlight (2016).

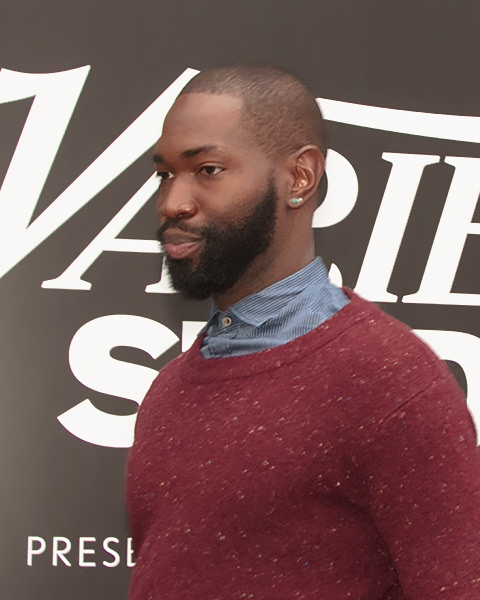
Tarell Alvin McCraney co-won for Moonlight (2016).

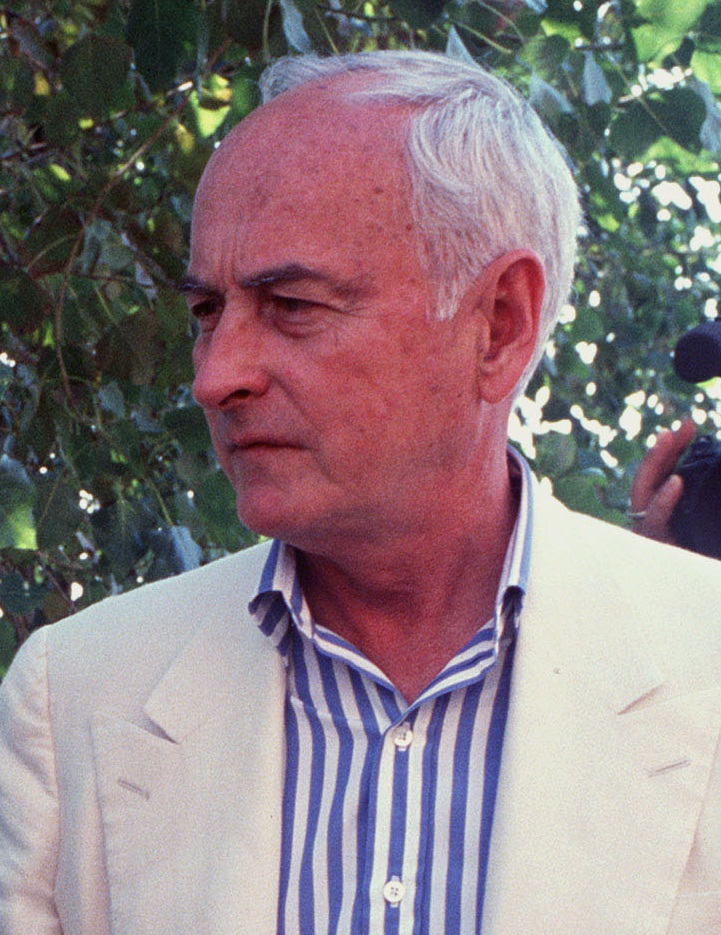
James Ivory co-won for Call Me by Your Name (2017).

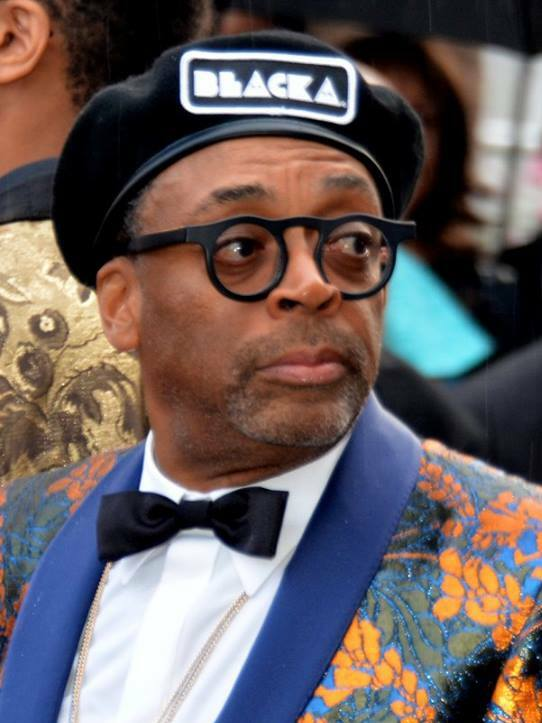
Spike Lee co-won for BlacKkKlansman (2018).

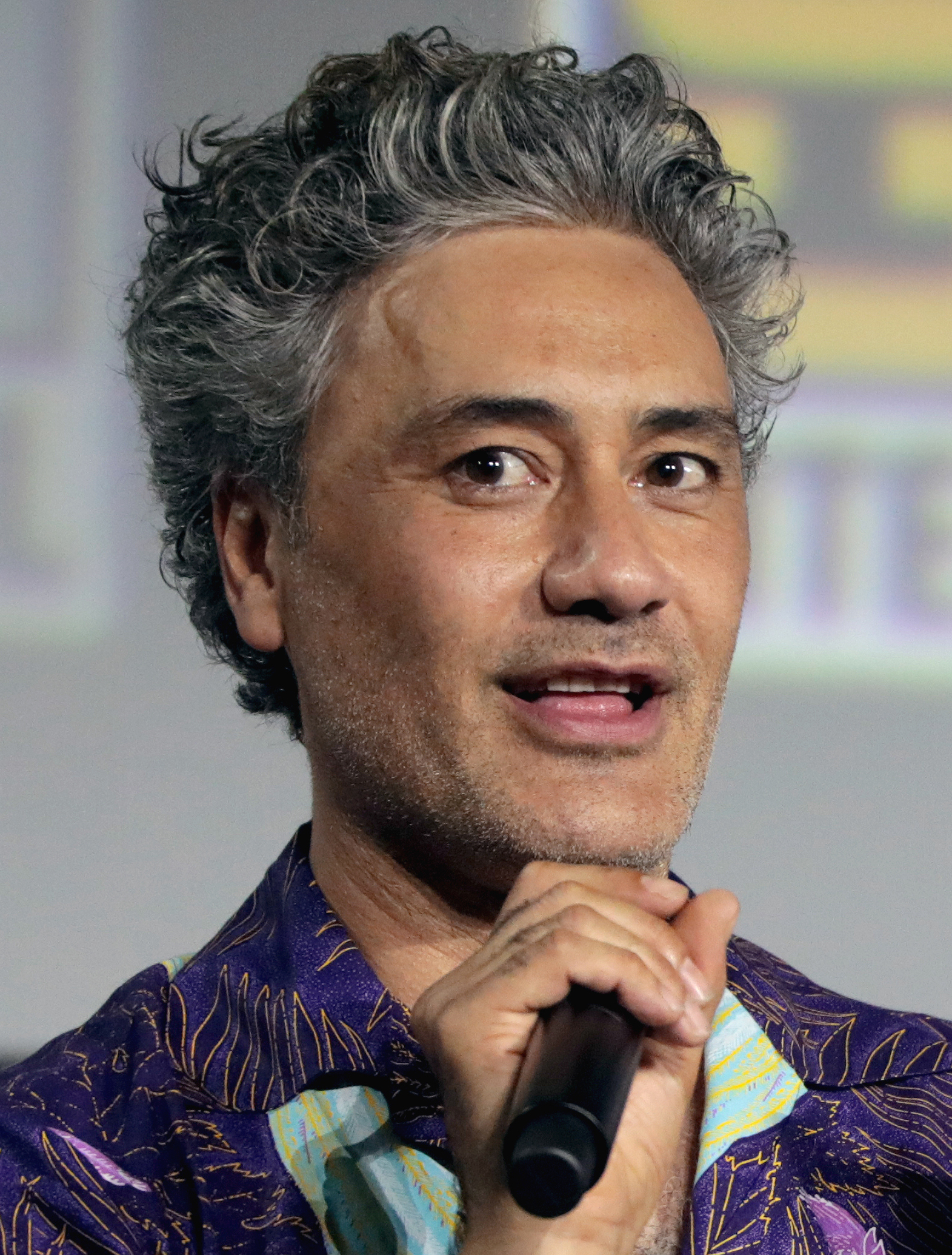
Taika Waititi won for Jojo Rabbit (2019).

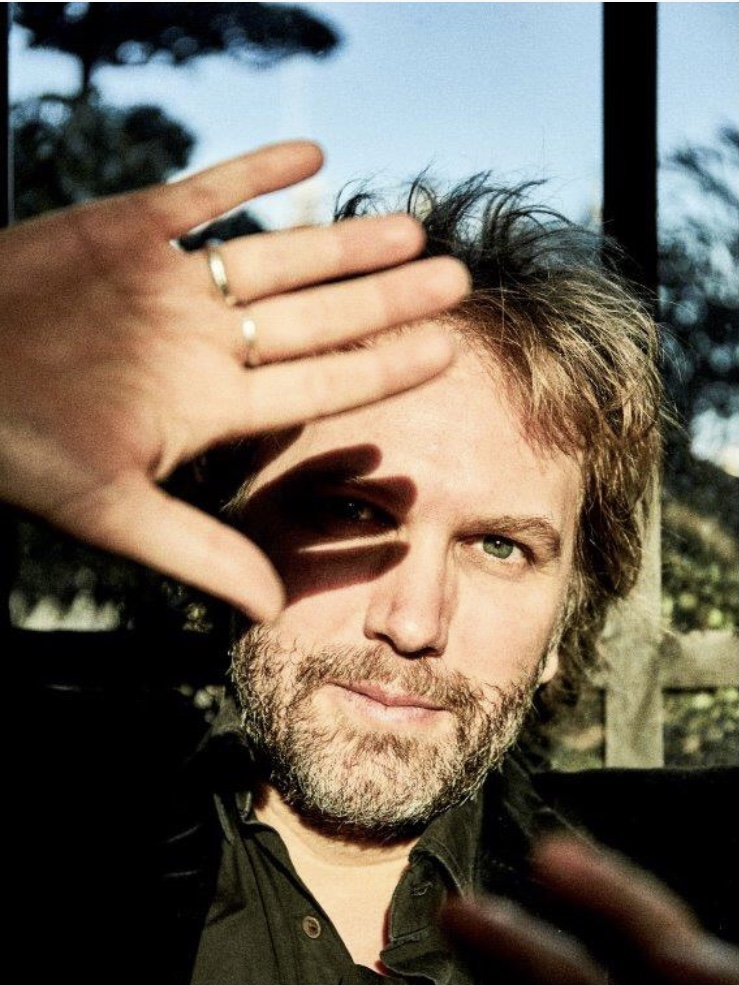
Florian Zeller co-won for The Father (2020), an adaptation of his play of the same name.

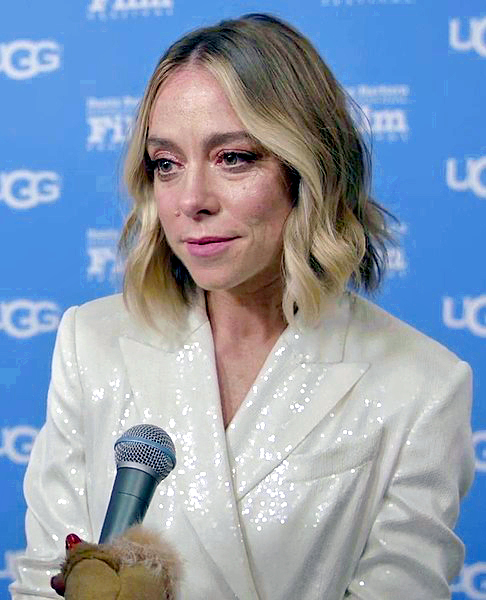
Sian Heder won for CODA (2021).

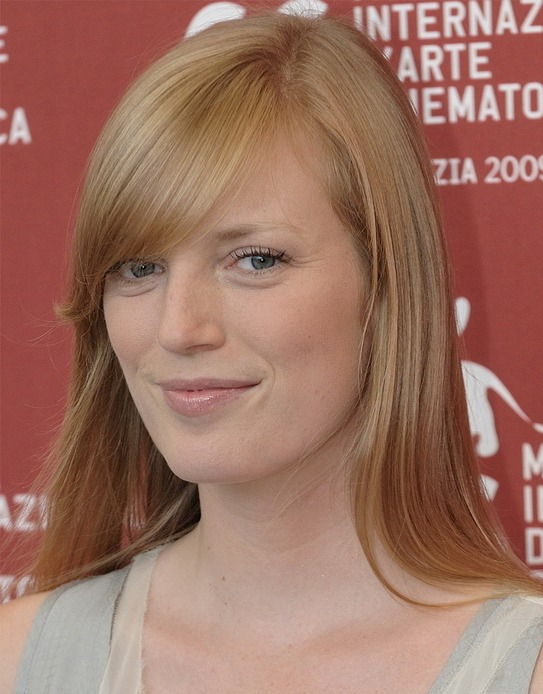
Sarah Polley won for Women Talking (2022).

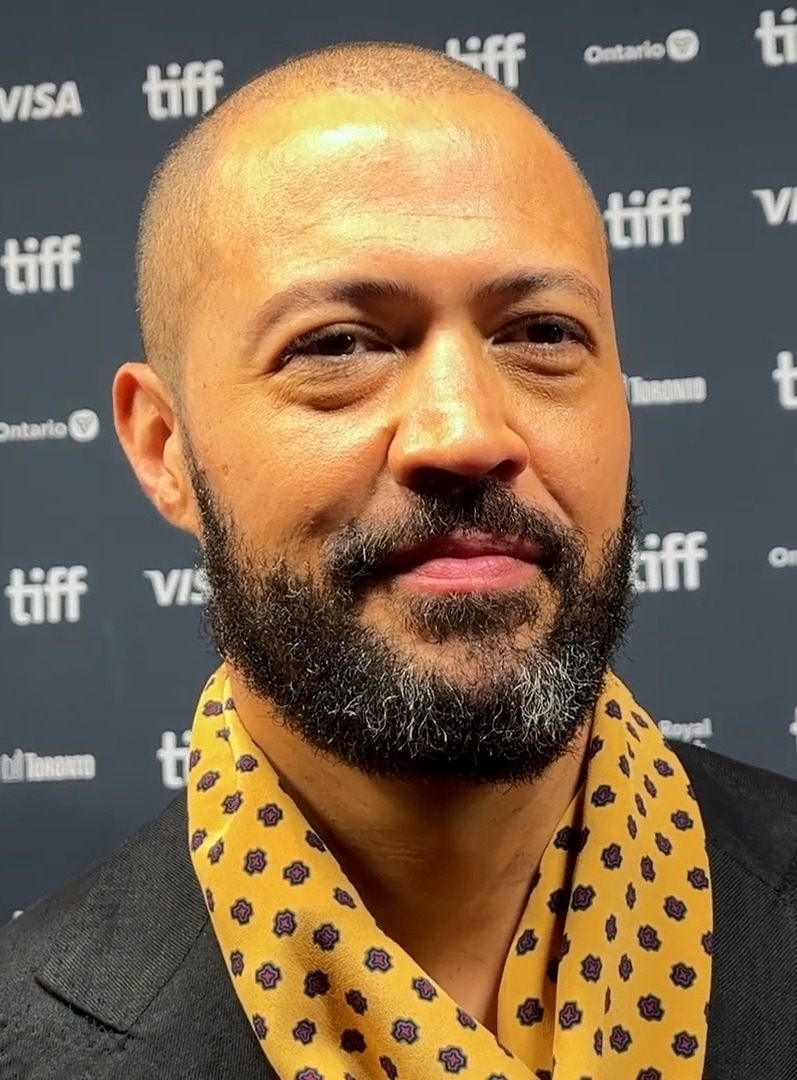
Cord Jefferson won for American Fiction (2023).

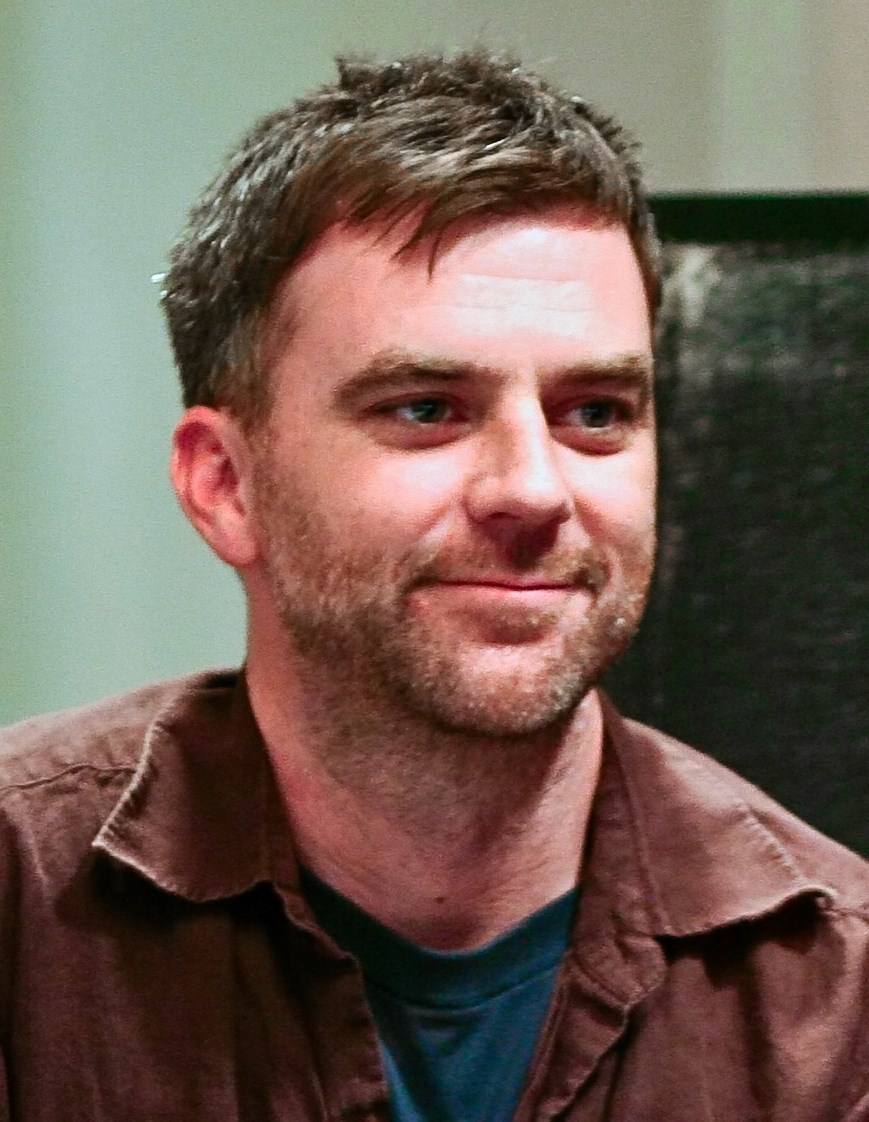
Paul Thomas Anderson won for One Battle After Another (2025).

== Winners and nominees ==
Winners are listed first in colored row, followed by the other nominees.

=== 1920s ===
Year	Film	Nominees	Source Material
1927/28 (1st) (Note: During these years, the award was bestowed as Best Writing, Adaptation.)	7th Heaven	Benjamin Glazer	The play Seventh Heaven by Austin Strong
1927/28 (1st)	Glorious Betsy	Anthony Coldeway	The play by Rida Johnson Young
1927/28 (1st)	The Jazz Singer	Alfred A. Cohn	The play & short story "The Day of Atonement" by Samson Raphaelson
1928/29 (2nd) (Note: The 2nd Academy Awards is unique in being the only occasion where there were no official nominees. Subsequent research by AMPAS has resulted in a list of unofficial or de facto nominees, based on records of which films were evaluated by the judges.)	The Patriot	Hanns Kräly	The novel by Alfred Neumann, play by Ashley Dukes & novel Paul I by Dmitry Merezhkovsky
1928/29 (2nd)	The Cop	Elliott J. Clawson	– (original)
1928/29 (2nd)	In Old Arizona	Tom Barry	The short story "The Caballero's Way" by O. Henry
1928/29 (2nd)	The Last of Mrs. Cheyney	Hanns Kräly	The play by Frederick Lonsdale
1928/29 (2nd)	The Leatherneck	Elliott J. Clawson	– (original)
1928/29 (2nd)	Our Dancing Daughters	Josephine Lovett	– (original)
1928/29 (2nd)	Sal of Singapore	Elliott J. Clawson	The novel The Sentimentalists by Dale Collins
1928/29 (2nd)	Skyscraper	Elliott J. Clawson	A story by Dudley Murphy
1928/29 (2nd)	The Valiant	Tom Barry	The play by Holworthy Hall & Robert Middlemass
1928/29 (2nd)	A Woman of Affairs	Bess Meredyth	The novel The Green Hat by Michael Arlen
1928/29 (2nd)	Wonder of Women	Bess Meredyth	The novel The Wife of Steffen Tromholt by Hermann Sudermann

=== 1930s ===
Year	Film	Nominees	Source Material
1929/30 (3rd) (Note: During this year, the award was bestowed as Best Writing and included both original and adapted screenplays.)	The Big House	Frances Marion	– (original)
1929/30 (3rd)	All Quiet on the Western Front	Screenplay: George Abbott; Adaptation: Maxwell Anderson & Del Andrews; Dialogue: Anderson	The novel by Erich Maria Remarque
1929/30 (3rd)	Disraeli	Julien Josephson	The play by Louis N. Parker
1929/30 (3rd)	The Divorcee	John Meehan	The novel Ex-Wife by Ursula Parrott
1929/30 (3rd)	Street of Chance	Howard Estabrook	A story by Oliver H.P. Garrett
1930/31 (4th)	Cimarron	Howard Estabrook	The novel by Edna Ferber
1930/31 (4th)	The Criminal Code	Seton I. Miller & Fred Niblo Jr.	The play by Martin Flavin
1930/31 (4th)	Holiday	Horace Jackson	The play by Philip Barry
1930/31 (4th)	Little Caesar	Screenplay: Francis Edward Faragoh; Continuity: Robert N. Lee	The novel by W. R. Burnett
1930/31 (4th)	Skippy	Joseph L. Mankiewicz & Sam Mintz	The comic strip by Percy Crosby
1931/32 (5th)	Bad Girl	Edwin J. Burke	The novel by Viña Delmar and play by Delmar and Brian Marlowe
1931/32 (5th)	Arrowsmith	Sidney Howard	The novel by Sinclair Lewis
1931/32 (5th)	Dr. Jekyll and Mr. Hyde	Percy Heath & Samuel Hoffenstein	The novella Strange Case of Dr Jekyll and Mr Hyde by Robert Louis Stevenson
1932/33 (6th) (Note: The Academy also announced that Robert Riskin came in second and Paul Green and Sonya Levien third.)	Little Women	Victor Heerman & Sarah Y. Mason	The novel by Louisa May Alcott
1932/33 (6th)	Lady for a Day	Robert Riskin	The short story "Madame La Gimp" by Damon Runyon
1932/33 (6th)	State Fair	Paul Green & Sonya Levien	The novel by Phil Stong
1934 (7th) (Note: The Academy also announced that Frances Goodrich and Albert Hackett came in second and Ben Hecht third.)	It Happened One Night	Robert Riskin	The short story "Night Bus" by Samuel Hopkins Adams
1934 (7th)	The Thin Man	Frances Goodrich & Albert Hackett	The novel by Dashiell Hammett
1934 (7th)	Viva Villa!	Ben Hecht	The book Viva Villa! A Recovery of the Real Pancho Villa, Peon, Bandit, Soldier, Patriot by Edgecumb Pinchon & O. B. Stade
1935 (8th) (Note: From 1935 until 1955, the award was bestowed as Best Writing, Screenplay.) (Note: Captain Blood, written by Casey Robinson from the novel Captain Blood: His Odyssey by Rafael Sabatini, was not officially nominated for this award, but appears in Academy records because it placed third in voting as a write-in candidate in 1935.) (Note: The Academy also announced that Talbot Jennings, Jules Furthman, and Carey Wilson came in second and Casey Robinson third. This means Waldemar Young, John L. Balderston, Achmed Abdullah, Grover Jones, and William Slavens McNutt came in fourth.)	The Informer	Dudley Nichols (Note: Dudley Nichols refused to accept the award, but was in possession of it by 1949 according to Academy records.)	The novel by Liam O'Flaherty
1935 (8th)	The Lives of a Bengal Lancer	Screenplay: Achmed Abdullah, John L. Balderston & Waldemar Young; Adaptation: Grover Jones & William Slavens McNutt	The memoir by Francis Yeats-Brown
1935 (8th)	Mutiny on the Bounty	Jules Furthman, Talbot Jennings & Carey Wilson	The novel by James Norman Hall & Charles Nordhoff
1936 (9th)	The Story of Louis Pasteur	Pierre Collings & Sheridan Gibney	(original)
1936 (9th)	After the Thin Man	Frances Goodrich & Albert Hackett	The novel The Thin Man by Dashiell Hammett
1936 (9th)	Dodsworth	Sidney Howard	The play by Howard & novel by Sinclair Lewis
1936 (9th)	Mr. Deeds Goes to Town	Robert Riskin	The short story "Opera Hat" by Bud Kelland
1936 (9th)	My Man Godfrey	Eric S. Hatch & Morrie Ryskind	The novel 1101 Park Avenue by Hatch
1937 (10th)	The Life of Emile Zola	Heinz Herald, Geza Herczeg & Norman Reilly Raine	The book Zola and His Time by Matthew Josephson
1937 (10th)	The Awful Truth	Viña Delmar	The play by Arthur Richman
1937 (10th)	Captains Courageous	Marc Connelly, Dale Van Every & John Lee Mahin	The novel Captain Courageous: A Story of the Grand Banks by Rudyard Kipling
1937 (10th)	Stage Door	Morrie Ryskind & Anthony Veiller	The play by Edna Ferber & George S. Kaufman
1937 (10th)	A Star Is Born	Alan Campbell, Robert Carson & Dorothy Parker	A story by William A. Wellman & Carson
1938 (11th)	Pygmalion	Screenplay & Dialogue: George Bernard Shaw; Adaptation: Ian Dalrymple, Cecil Arthur Lewis & W. P. Lipscomb	The play by Shaw
1938 (11th)	Boys Town	John Meehan & Dore Schary	A story by Schary & Eleanore Griffin
1938 (11th)	The Citadel	Dalrymple, Betty Hill & Spig Wead	The novel by A. J. Cronin
1938 (11th)	Four Daughters	Lenore Coffee & Julius J. Epstein	The short story "Sister Act" by Fannie Hurst
1938 (11th)	You Can't Take It with You	Robert Riskin	The play by George S. Kaufman & Moss Hart
1939 (12th)	Gone with the Wind	Sidney Howard (p.r.)	The novel by Margaret Mitchell
1939 (12th)	Goodbye, Mr. Chips	Holt Marvell, R. C. Sherriff & Claudine West	The novella by James Hilton
1939 (12th)	Mr. Smith Goes to Washington	Sidney Buchman	A story by Lewis R. Foster
1939 (12th)	Ninotchka	Charles Brackett, Walter Reisch & Billy Wilder	A story by Melchior Lengyel
1939 (12th)	Wuthering Heights	Ben Hecht & Charles MacArthur	The novel by Emily Brontë

=== 1940s ===
Year	Film	Nominees	Source Material
1940 (13th)	The Philadelphia Story	Donald Ogden Stewart	The play by Philip Barry
1940 (13th)	The Grapes of Wrath	Nunnally Johnson	The novel by John Steinbeck
1940 (13th)	Kitty Foyle	Dalton Trumbo	The novel by Christopher Morley
1940 (13th)	The Long Voyage Home	Dudley Nichols	The plays The Moon of the Caribees, In the Zone, Bound East for Cardiff & The Long Voyage Home by Eugene O'Neill
1940 (13th)	Rebecca	Joan Harrison & Robert E. Sherwood	The novel by Daphne du Maurier
1941 (14th)	Here Comes Mr. Jordan	Sidney Buchman & Seton I. Miller	The play Heaven Can Wait by Harry Segall
1941 (14th)	Hold Back the Dawn	Charles Brackett & Billy Wilder	The novel by Ketti Frings
1941 (14th)	How Green Was My Valley	Philip Dunne	The novel by Richard Llewellyn
1941 (14th)	The Little Foxes	Lillian Hellman	The play by Hellman
1941 (14th)	The Maltese Falcon	John Huston	The novel by Dashiell Hammett
1942 (15th)	Mrs. Miniver	George Froeschel, James Hilton, Claudine West & Arthur Wimperis	The character Mrs. Miniver from the articles by Jan Struther
1942 (15th)	49th Parallel	Rodney Ackland & Emeric Pressburger	A story by Pressburger
1942 (15th)	The Pride of the Yankees	Herman J. Mankiewicz & Jo Swerling	A story by Paul Gallico
1942 (15th)	Random Harvest	Froeschel, West & Wimperis	The novel by Hilton
1942 (15th)	The Talk of the Town	Sidney Buchman & Irwin Shaw	A story by Sidney Harmon
1943 (16th)	Casablanca	Philip G. Epstein, Julius J. Epstein & Howard Koch	The play Everybody Comes to Rick's by Joan Alison & Murray Burnett
1943 (16th)	Holy Matrimony	Nunnally Johnson	The novel Buried Alive by Arnold Bennett
1943 (16th)	The More the Merrier	Richard Flournoy, Lewis R. Foster, Frank Ross & Robert W. Russell	A story by Ross & Russell
1943 (16th)	The Song of Bernadette	George Seaton	The novel by Franz Werfel
1943 (16th)	Watch on the Rhine	Dashiell Hammett	The play by Lillian Hellman
1944 (17th)	Going My Way	Frank Butler & Frank Cavett	A story by Leo McCarey
1944 (17th)	Double Indemnity	Raymond Chandler & Billy Wilder	The novel Double Indemnity in Three of a Kind by James M. Cain
1944 (17th)	Gaslight	John L. Balderston, Walter Reisch & John Van Druten	The play Gas Light by Patrick Hamilton
1944 (17th)	Laura	Jay Dratler, Samuel Hoffenstein & Elizabeth Reinhardt	The novel by Vera Caspary
1944 (17th)	Meet Me in St. Louis	Irving Brecher & Fred F. Finklehoffe	The novel by Sally Benson
1945 (18th)	The Lost Weekend	Charles Brackett & Billy Wilder	The novel by Charles R. Jackson
1945 (18th)	G. I. Joe	Leopold Atlas, Guy Endore & Philip Stevenson	The memoirs Brave Men & Here Is Your War by Ernie Pyle
1945 (18th)	Mildred Pierce	Ranald MacDougall	The novel by James M. Cain
1945 (18th)	Pride of the Marines	Albert Maltz	The book Al Schmid, Marine by Roger Butterfield
1945 (18th)	A Tree Grows in Brooklyn	Frank Davis & Tess Slesinger (p.n.)	The novel by Betty Smith
1946 (19th)	The Best Years of Our Lives	Robert E. Sherwood	The novella Glory for Me by MacKinlay Kantor
1946 (19th)	Anna and the King of Siam	Sally Benson & Talbot Jennings	The novel by Margaret Landon
1946 (19th)	Brief Encounter	Anthony Havelock-Allan, David Lean & Ronald Neame	The play Still Life by Noël Coward
1946 (19th)	The Killers	Anthony Veiller	The short story by Ernest Hemingway
1946 (19th)	Rome, Open City	Sergio Amidei & Federico Fellini	A story by Amidei & Alberto Consiglio
1947 (20th)	Miracle on 34th Street	George Seaton	A story by Valentine Davies
1947 (20th)	Boomerang	Richard Murphy	The article "The Perfect Case" by Anthony Abbot
1947 (20th)	Crossfire	John Paxton	The novel The Brick Foxhole by Richard Brooks
1947 (20th)	Gentleman's Agreement	Moss Hart	The novel by Laura Z. Hobson
1947 (20th)	Great Expectations	David Lean, Anthony Havelock-Allan, & Ronald Neame	The novel by Charles Dickens
1948 (21st)	The Treasure of the Sierra Madre	John Huston	The novel by B. Traven
1948 (21st)	A Foreign Affair	Charles Brackett, Richard L. Breen & Billy Wilder	A story by David Shaw
1948 (21st)	Johnny Belinda	Allen Vincent & Irma von Cube	The play by Elmer Blaney Harris
1948 (21st)	The Search	Richard Schweizer & David Wechsler	– (original screenplay)
1948 (21st)	The Snake Pit	Millen Brand & Frank Partos	The novel by Mary Jane Ward
1949 (22nd)	A Letter to Three Wives	Joseph L. Mankiewicz	The novel by John Klempner
1949 (22nd)	All the King's Men	Robert Rossen	The novel by Robert Penn Warren
1949 (22nd)	The Bicycle Thief	Cesare Zavattini	The novel by Luigi Bartolini
1949 (22nd)	Champion	Carl Foreman	The short story by Ring Lardner
1949 (22nd)	The Fallen Idol	Graham Greene	The short story "The Basement Room" by Greene

=== 1950s ===
Year	Film	Nominees	Source Material
1950 (23rd)	All About Eve	Joseph L. Mankiewicz	The short story "The Wisdom of Eve" by Mary Orr
1950 (23rd)	The Asphalt Jungle	John Huston & Ben Maddow	The novel by W. R. Burnett
1950 (23rd)	Born Yesterday	Albert Mannheimer	The play by Garson Kanin
1950 (23rd)	Broken Arrow	Albert Maltz (Note: Michael Blankfort was originally nominated as the screenwriter of Broken Arrow. In 1991, research proved blacklisted Albert Maltz was the screenwriter and his credit was restored. Blankfort was removed from the nomination and it was given to Maltz.)	The novel Blood Brother by Elliott Arnold
1950 (23rd)	Father of the Bride	Frances Goodrich & Albert Hackett	The novel by E. Streeter
1951 (24th)	A Place in the Sun	Harry Brown & Michael Wilson	The novel An American Tragedy by Theodore Dreiser & play by Patrick Kearney
1951 (24th)	The African Queen	James Agee & John Huston	The novel by C. S. Forester
1951 (24th)	Detective Story	Robert Wyler & Philip Yordan	The play by Sidney Kingsley
1951 (24th)	La Ronde	Jacques Natanson & Max Ophüls	The play by Arthur Schnitzler
1951 (24th)	A Streetcar Named Desire	Tennessee Williams	The play by Williams
1952 (25th)	The Bad and the Beautiful	Charles Schnee	A story by George Bradshaw
1952 (25th)	5 Fingers	Michael Wilson	The novel Operation Cicero by Ludwig Carl Moyzisch
1952 (25th)	High Noon	Carl Foreman	The short story "The Tin Star" by John W. Cunningham
1952 (25th)	The Man in the White Suit	John Dighton, Alexander Mackendrick & Roger MacDougall	A story by MacDougall
1952 (25th)	The Quiet Man	Frank Nugent	The short story by Maurice Walsh
1953 (26th)	From Here to Eternity	Daniel Taradash	The novel by James Jones
1953 (26th)	The Cruel Sea	Eric Ambler	The novel by Nicholas Monsarrat
1953 (26th)	Lili	Helen Deutsch	The short story "The Man Who Hated People" by Paul Gallico
1953 (26th)	Roman Holiday	John Dighton & Ian McLellan Hunter	A story by Dalton Trumbo (front: Ian McLellan Hunter)
1953 (26th)	Shane	A. B. Guthrie Jr.	The novel by Jack Schaefer
1954 (27th)	The Country Girl	George Seaton	The play by Clifford Odets
1954 (27th)	The Caine Mutiny	Stanley Roberts	The novel by Herman Wouk
1954 (27th)	Rear Window	John Michael Hayes	The short story "It Had to Be Murder" by Cornell Woolrich
1954 (27th)	Sabrina	Ernest Lehman, Samuel A. Taylor & Billy Wilder	The play Sabrina Fair by Taylor
1954 (27th)	Seven Brides for Seven Brothers	Frances Goodrich, Albert Hackett & Dorothy Kingsley	The short story "The Sobbin' Women" by Stephen Vincent Benét
1955 (28th)	Marty	Paddy Chayefsky	The television play on The Philco Television Playhouse by Chayefsky
1955 (28th)	Bad Day at Black Rock	Millard Kaufman	The short story "Bad Time at Honda" by Howard Breslin
1955 (28th)	Blackboard Jungle	Richard Brooks	The novel by Evan Hunter
1955 (28th)	East of Eden	Paul Osborn	The novel by John Steinbeck
1955 (28th)	Love Me or Leave Me	Daniel Fuchs & Isobel Lennart	A story by Fuchs
1956 (29th)	Around the World in 80 Days	John Farrow, S. J. Perelman & James Poe	The novel by Jules Verne
1956 (29th)	Baby Doll	Tennessee Williams	The plays 27 Wagons Full of Cotton & The Long Stay Cut Short, or The Unsatisfactory Supper by Williams
1956 (29th)	Friendly Persuasion	Michael Wilson (Note: Michael Wilson was originally credited as the screenwriter of Friendly Persuasion, but Allied Artists, acting in agreement with the Screen Writers Guild, removed his credit because he was blacklisted. Early in 1957, the Academy revised its bylaws so the film would be eligible for a writing nomination without naming Wilson as a nominee. Friendly Persuasion was initially announced a nominee without a writer's name attached. The Academy's Board of Governors voted to strike the nomination altogether and it was not included on the final ballot. The Board of Governors, however, reinstated the nomination with Wilson's name attached in 2002.)	The novel by Jessamyn West
1956 (29th)	Giant	Fred Guiol & Ivan Moffat	The novel by Edna Ferber
1956 (29th)	Lust for Life	Norman Corwin	The novel by Irving Stone
1957 (30th)	The Bridge on the River Kwai	Pierre Boulle, Carl Foreman, & Michael Wilson (Note: Pierre Boulle was credited as the screenwriter of The Bridge on the River Kwai and ultimately won the award. Blacklisted writers Michael Wilson and Carl Foreman, who actually wrote the screenplay, were awarded posthumous Oscars by the Academy's Board of Governors in 1984.)	The novel The Bridge over the River Kwai by Boulle
1957 (30th)	12 Angry Men	Reginald Rose	The teleplay on Westinghouse Studio One and stage play by Rose
1957 (30th)	Heaven Knows, Mr. Allison	John Huston & John Lee Mahin	The novel by Charles Shaw
1957 (30th)	Peyton Place	John Michael Hayes	The novel by Grace Metalious
1957 (30th)	Sayonara	Paul Osborn	The novel by James A. Michener
1958 (31st)	Gigi	Alan Jay Lerner	The novella by Colette
1958 (31st)	Cat on a Hot Tin Roof	Richard Brooks & James Poe	The play & short story "Three Players of a Summer Game" by Tennessee Williams
1958 (31st)	The Horse's Mouth	Alec Guinness	The novel by Joyce Cary
1958 (31st)	I Want to Live!	Nelson Gidding & Don Mankiewicz	Articles by Edward S. Montgomery & letters by Barbara Graham
1958 (31st)	Separate Tables	John Gay & Terence Rattigan	The plays by Rattigan
1959 (32nd)	Room at the Top	Neil Paterson	The novel by John Braine
1959 (32nd)	Anatomy of a Murder	Wendell Mayes	The novel by John D. Voelker
1959 (32nd)	Ben-Hur	Karl Tunberg	The novel Ben-Hur: A Tale of the Christ by Lew Wallace
1959 (32nd)	The Nun's Story	Robert Anderson	The novel by Kathryn Hulme
1959 (32nd)	Some Like It Hot	I. A. L. Diamond & Billy Wilder	The 1935 French film Fanfare of Love written by Max Bronnet, Michael Logan, Pierre Prévert, René Pujol and Robert Thoeren & the 1951 German remake Fanfares of Love written by Logan, Thoeren and Heinz Pauck

=== 1960s ===
Year	Film	Nominees	Source Material
1960 (33rd)	Elmer Gantry	Richard Brooks	The novel by Sinclair Lewis
1960 (33rd)	Inherit the Wind	Harold Jacob Smith & Nedrick Young (Note: Due to blacklisting, Young wrote under the pseudonym Nathan E. Douglas.)	The play by Jerome Lawrence & Robert E. Lee
1960 (33rd)	Sons and Lovers	T. E. B. Clarke & Gavin Lambert	The novel by D. H. Lawrence
1960 (33rd)	The Sundowners	Isobel Lennart	The novel by Jon Cleary
1960 (33rd)	Tunes of Glory	James Kennaway	The novel by Kennaway
1961 (34th)	Judgment at Nuremberg	Abby Mann	The television play on Playhouse 90 by Mann
1961 (34th)	Breakfast at Tiffany's	George Axelrod	The novella by Truman Capote
1961 (34th)	The Guns of Navarone	Carl Foreman	The novel by Alistair MacLean
1961 (34th)	The Hustler	Sidney Carroll & Robert Rossen	The novel by Walter Tevis
1961 (34th)	West Side Story	Ernest Lehman	The musical by Arthur Laurents
1962 (35th)	To Kill a Mockingbird	Horton Foote	The novel by Harper Lee
1962 (35th)	David and Lisa	Eleanor Perry	The novella Lisa and David by Dr. Theodore Isaac Rubin
1962 (35th)	Lawrence of Arabia	Robert Bolt & Michael Wilson (Note: In 1995, research proved blacklisted Michael Wilson was also a screenwriter of Lawrence of Arabia. He was added as a nominee by the Academy's Board of Governors.)	The memoir Seven Pillars of Wisdom by T. E. Lawrence
1962 (35th)	Lolita	Vladimir Nabokov	The novel by Nabokov
1962 (35th)	The Miracle Worker	William Gibson	The play & television play on Playhouse 90 by Gibson
1963 (36th)	Tom Jones	John Osborne	The novel The History of Tom Jones, a Foundling by Henry Fielding
1963 (36th)	Captain Newman, M.D.	Richard L. Breen, Henry & Phoebe Ephron	The novel by Leo Rosten
1963 (36th)	Hud	Harriet Frank Jr. & Irving Ravetch	The novel Horseman, Pass By by Larry McMurtry
1963 (36th)	Lilies of the Field	James Poe	The novel by William Edmund Barrett
1963 (36th)	Sundays and Cybele	Scenario: Serge Bourguignon & Antoine Tudal; Dialogue: Bourguignon	The novel Les dimanches de Ville d'Avray by Bernard Eschassériaux
1964 (37th)	Becket	Edward Anhalt	The play by Jean Anouilh
1964 (37th)	Dr. Strangelove or: How I Learned to Stop Worrying and Love the Bomb	Stanley Kubrick, Peter George & Terry Southern	The novel Red Alert by George
1964 (37th)	Mary Poppins	Don DaGradi & Bill Walsh	The novel series by P. L. Travers
1964 (37th)	My Fair Lady	Alan Jay Lerner	The musical by Lerner
1964 (37th)	Zorba the Greek	Michael Cacoyannis	The novel by Nikos Kazantzakis
1965 (38th)	Doctor Zhivago	Robert Bolt	The novel by Boris Pasternak
1965 (38th)	Cat Ballou	Walter Newman & Frank Pierson	The novel The Ballad of Cat Ballou by Roy Chanslor
1965 (38th)	The Collector	John Kohn & Stanley Mann	The novel by John Fowles
1965 (38th)	Ship of Fools	Abby Mann	The novel by Katherine Anne Porter
1965 (38th)	A Thousand Clowns	Herb Gardner	The play by Gardner
1966 (39th)	A Man for All Seasons	Robert Bolt	The play by Bolt
1966 (39th)	Alfie	Bill Naughton	The play by Naughton
1966 (39th)	The Professionals	Richard Brooks	The novel A Mule for the Marquesa by Frank O'Rourke
1966 (39th)	The Russians Are Coming, the Russians Are Coming	William Rose	The novel The Off-Islanders by Nathaniel Benchley
1966 (39th)	Who's Afraid of Virginia Woolf?	Ernest Lehman	The play by Edward Albee
1967 (40th)	In the Heat of the Night	Stirling Silliphant	The novel by John Ball
1967 (40th)	Cool Hand Luke	Donn Pearce & Frank Pierson	The novel by Pearce
1967 (40th)	The Graduate	Buck Henry & Calder Willingham	The novella by Charles Webb
1967 (40th)	In Cold Blood	Richard Brooks	The book by Truman Capote
1967 (40th)	Ulysses	Fred Haines & Joseph Strick	The novel by James Joyce
1968 (41st)	The Lion in Winter	James Goldman	The play by Goldman
1968 (41st)	The Odd Couple	Neil Simon	The play by Simon
1968 (41st)	Oliver!	Vernon Harris	The musical by Lionel Bart
1968 (41st)	Rachel, Rachel	Stewart Stern	The novel A Jest of God by Margaret Laurence
1968 (41st)	Rosemary's Baby	Roman Polanski	The novel by Ira Levin
1969 (42nd)	Midnight Cowboy	Waldo Salt	The novel by James Leo Herlihy
1969 (42nd)	Anne of the Thousand Days	Screenplay: Bridget Boland & John Hale; Adaptation: Richard Sokolove	The play by Maxwell Anderson
1969 (42nd)	Goodbye, Columbus	Arnold Schulman	The novella by Philip Roth
1969 (42nd)	They Shoot Horses, Don't They?	James Poe & Robert E. Thompson	The novel by Horace McCoy
1969 (42nd)	Z	Costa-Gavras & Jorge Semprún	The novel by Vassilis Vassilikos

=== 1970s ===
Year	Film	Nominees	Source Material
1970 (43rd)	M*A*S*H	Ring Lardner Jr.	The novel MASH: A Novel About Three Army Doctors by Richard Hooker
1970 (43rd)	Airport	George Seaton	The novel by Arthur Hailey
1970 (43rd)	I Never Sang for My Father	Robert Anderson	The play by Anderson
1970 (43rd)	Lovers and Other Strangers	Joseph Bologna, David Zelag Goodman & Renée Taylor	The play by Bologna & Taylor
1970 (43rd)	Women in Love	Larry Kramer	The novel by D. H. Lawrence
1971 (44th)	The French Connection	Ernest Tidyman	The book The French Connection: The World's Most Crucial Narcotics Investigation by Robin Moore
1971 (44th)	A Clockwork Orange	Stanley Kubrick	The novel by Anthony Burgess
1971 (44th)	The Conformist	Bernardo Bertolucci	The novel by Alberto Moravia
1971 (44th)	The Garden of the Finzi-Continis	Vittorio Bonicelli & Ugo Pirro	The novel by Giorgio Bassani
1971 (44th)	The Last Picture Show	Peter Bogdanovich & Larry McMurtry	The novel by McMurtry
1972 (45th)	The Godfather	Francis Ford Coppola & Mario Puzo	The novel by Puzo
1972 (45th)	Cabaret	Jay Presson Allen	The musical by Joe Masteroff
1972 (45th)	The Emigrants	Bengt Forslund & Jan Troell	The novels The Emigrants & Unto a Good Land by Vilhelm Moberg
1972 (45th)	Pete 'n' Tillie	Julius J. Epstein	The novella Witch's Milk by Peter De Vries
1972 (45th)	Sounder	Lonne Elder III	The novel by William H. Armstrong
1973 (46th)	The Exorcist	William Peter Blatty	The novel by Blatty
1973 (46th)	The Last Detail	Robert Towne	The novel by Darryl Ponicsan
1973 (46th)	The Paper Chase	James Bridges	The novel by John Jay Osborn Jr.
1973 (46th)	Paper Moon	Alvin Sargent	The novel Addie Pray by Joe David Brown
1973 (46th)	Serpico	Waldo Salt & Norman Wexler	The book Serpico: The Cop Who Defied the System by Peter Maas
1974 (47th)	The Godfather Part II	Francis Ford Coppola & Mario Puzo	The novel The Godfather by Puzo
1974 (47th)	The Apprenticeship of Duddy Kravitz	Screenplay: Mordecai Richler; Adaptation: Lionel Chetwynd	The novel by Richler
1974 (47th)	Lenny	Julian Barry	The play by Barry
1974 (47th)	Murder on the Orient Express	Paul Dehn	The novel by Agatha Christie
1974 (47th)	Young Frankenstein	Mel Brooks & Gene Wilder	The novel Frankenstein; or, The Modern Prometheus by Mary Shelley
1975 (48th)	One Flew Over the Cuckoo's Nest	Bo Goldman & Lawrence Hauben	The novel by Ken Kesey
1975 (48th)	Barry Lyndon	Stanley Kubrick	The novel The Luck of Barry Lyndon by William Makepeace Thackeray
1975 (48th)	The Man Who Would Be King	Gladys Hill & John Huston	The short story by Rudyard Kipling
1975 (48th)	Profumo di donna	Ruggero Maccari & Dino Risi	The novel Il buio e il mare by Giovanni Arpino
1975 (48th)	The Sunshine Boys	Neil Simon	The play by Simon
1976 (49th)	All the President's Men	William Goldman	The memoir by Carl Bernstein & Bob Woodward
1976 (49th)	Bound for Glory	Robert Getchell	The memoir by Woody Guthrie
1976 (49th)	Fellini's Casanova	Federico Fellini & Bernardino Zapponi	The memoir History of My Life by Giacomo Casanova
1976 (49th)	The Seven-Per-Cent Solution	Nicholas Meyer	The novel The Seven-Per-Cent Solution: Being a Reprint from the Reminiscences of John H. Watson, M.D. by Meyer
1976 (49th)	Voyage of the Damned	David Butler & Steve Shagan	The book by Gordon Thomas & Max Morgan-Witts
1977 (50th)	Julia	Alvin Sargent	The memoir Pentimento: A Book of Portraits by Lillian Hellman
1977 (50th)	Equus	Peter Shaffer	The play by Shaffer
1977 (50th)	I Never Promised You a Rose Garden	Lewis John Carlino & Gavin Lambert	The novel by Joanne Greenberg
1977 (50th)	Oh, God!	Larry Gelbart	The novel by Avery Corman
1977 (50th)	That Obscure Object of Desire	Scenario: Luis Buñuel; Collaboration: Jean-Claude Carrière	The novel The Woman and the Puppet by Pierre Louÿs
1978 (51st)	Midnight Express	Oliver Stone	The memoir by Billy Hayes & William Hoffer
1978 (51st)	Bloodbrothers	Walter Newman	The novel by Richard Price
1978 (51st)	California Suite	Neil Simon	The play by Simon
1978 (51st)	Heaven Can Wait	Warren Beatty & Elaine May	The play by Harry Segall
1978 (51st)	Same Time, Next Year	Bernard Slade	The play by Slade
1979 (52nd)	Kramer vs. Kramer	Robert Benton	The novel by Avery Corman
1979 (52nd)	Apocalypse Now	Francis Ford Coppola & John Milius	The novel Heart of Darkness by Joseph Conrad
1979 (52nd)	La Cage aux Folles	Marcello Danon, Édouard Molinaro, Jean Poiret & Francis Veber	The play by Poiret
1979 (52nd)	A Little Romance	Allan Burns	The novel E=mc^{2} Mon Amour by Patrick Cauvin
1979 (52nd)	Norma Rae	Harriet Frank Jr. & Irving Ravetch	The book Crystal Lee, a Woman of Inheritance by Hank Leiferman

=== 1980s ===
Year	Film	Nominees	Source Material
1980 (53rd)	Ordinary People	Alvin Sargent	The novel by Judith Guest
1980 (53rd)	Breaker Morant	Bruce Beresford, Jonathan Hardy & David Stevens	The play Breaker Morant: A Play in Two Acts by Kenneth G. Ross
1980 (53rd)	Coal Miner's Daughter	Thomas Rickman	The memoir Loretta Lynn: Coal Miner's Daughter by Loretta Lynn & George Vecsey
1980 (53rd)	The Elephant Man	Eric Bergren, Christopher De Vore & David Lynch	The memoir The Elephant Man and Other Reminiscences by Frederick Treves & book The Elephant Man: A Study in Human Dignity by Ashley Montagu
1980 (53rd)	The Stunt Man	Screenplay: Lawrence B. Marcus; Adaptation: Richard Rush	The novel by Paul Brodeur
1981 (54th)	On Golden Pond	Ernest Thompson	The play by Thompson
1981 (54th)	The French Lieutenant's Woman	Harold Pinter	The novel by John Fowles
1981 (54th)	Pennies from Heaven	Dennis Potter	The television series by Potter
1981 (54th)	Prince of the City	Jay Presson Allen & Sidney Lumet	The book Prince of the City: The True Story of a Cop Who Knew Too Much by Robert Daley
1981 (54th)	Ragtime	Michael Weller	The novel by E. L. Doctorow
1982 (55th)	Missing	Costa-Gavras & Donald E. Stewart	The book The Execution of Charles Horman: An American Sacrifice by Thomas Hauser
1982 (55th)	Das Boot	Wolfgang Petersen	The novel by Lothar-Günther Buchheim
1982 (55th)	Sophie's Choice	Alan J. Pakula	The novel by William Styron
1982 (55th)	The Verdict	David Mamet	The novel by Barry Reed
1982 (55th)	Victor/Victoria	Blake Edwards	The film Victor and Victoria by Reinhold Schünzel
1983 (56th)	Terms of Endearment	James L. Brooks	The novel by Larry McMurtry
1983 (56th)	Betrayal	Harold Pinter	The play by Pinter
1983 (56th)	The Dresser	Ronald Harwood	The play by Harwood
1983 (56th)	Educating Rita	Willy Russell	The play by Russell
1983 (56th)	Reuben, Reuben	Julius J. Epstein	The play Spofford by Herman Shumlin & novel by Peter De Vries
1984 (57th)	Amadeus	Peter Shaffer	The play by Shaffer
1984 (57th)	Greystoke: The Legend of Tarzan, Lord of the Apes	Michael Austin & Robert Towne (Note: Greystoke: The Legend of Tarzan, Lord of the Apes was initially adapted by screenwriter Robert Towne, but he removed his name from the credits because he was unhappy with co-writer Michael Austin's alterations and the finished film itself. He instead used the pseudonym P.H. Vazak, the name of his late Hungarian sheepdog.)	The novel Tarzan of the Apes by Edgar Rice Burroughs
1984 (57th)	The Killing Fields	Bruce Robinson	The article "The Death and Life of Dith Pran: A Story of Cambodia" by Sydney Schanberg
1984 (57th)	A Passage to India	David Lean	The novel by E. M. Forster
1984 (57th)	A Soldier's Story	Charles Fuller	The play A Soldier's Play by Fuller
1985 (58th)	Out of Africa	Kurt Luedtke	The memoir by Karen Blixen & books Silence Will Speak: A Study of the Life of Denys Finch Hatton and His Relationship With Karen Blixen by Errol Trzebinski & Isak Dinesen: The Life of a Storyteller by Judith Thurman
1985 (58th)	The Color Purple	Menno Meyjes	The novel by Alice Walker
1985 (58th)	Kiss of the Spider Woman	Leonard Schrader	The novel by Manuel Puig
1985 (58th)	Prizzi's Honor	Richard Condon & Janet Roach	The novel by Condon
1985 (58th)	The Trip to Bountiful	Horton Foote	The play & television film by Foote
1986 (59th)	A Room with a View	Ruth Prawer Jhabvala	The novel by E. M. Forster
1986 (59th)	Children of a Lesser God	Hesper Anderson & Mark Medoff	The play by Medoff
1986 (59th)	The Color of Money	Richard Price	The novel by Walter Tevis
1986 (59th)	Crimes of the Heart	Beth Henley	The play by Henley
1986 (59th)	Stand by Me	Bruce A. Evans & Raynold Gideon	The novella The Body by Stephen King
1987 (60th)	The Last Emperor	Bernardo Bertolucci & Mark Peploe	The memoir From Emperor to Citizen: The Autobiography of Aisin-Gioro Pu Yi by Puyi
1987 (60th)	The Dead	Tony Huston	The short story by James Joyce
1987 (60th)	Fatal Attraction	James Dearden	The television film Diversion by Dearden
1987 (60th)	Full Metal Jacket	Gustav Hasford, Michael Herr & Stanley Kubrick	The novel The Short-Timers by Hasford
1987 (60th)	My Life as a Dog	Per Berglund, Brasse Brännström, Lasse Hallström & Reidar Jönsson	The novel Mitt liv som hund by Jönsson
1988 (61st)	Dangerous Liaisons	Christopher Hampton	The play Les Liaisons Dangereuses by Hampton & novel by Pierre Choderlos de Laclos
1988 (61st)	The Accidental Tourist	Frank Galati & Lawrence Kasdan	The novel by Anne Tyler
1988 (61st)	Gorillas in the Mist	Screenplay: Anna Hamilton Phelan; Story: Tab Murphy & Phelan	The article by Harold Hayes
1988 (61st)	Little Dorrit	Christine Edzard	The novel by Charles Dickens
1988 (61st)	The Unbearable Lightness of Being	Jean-Claude Carrière & Philip Kaufman	The novel by Milan Kundera
1989 (62nd)	Driving Miss Daisy	Alfred Uhry	The play by Uhry
1989 (62nd)	Born on the Fourth of July	Ron Kovic & Oliver Stone	The memoir by Kovic
1989 (62nd)	Enemies, A Love Story	Paul Mazursky & Roger L. Simon	The novel by Isaac Bashevis Singer
1989 (62nd)	Field of Dreams	Phil Alden Robinson	The novel Shoeless Joe by W. P. Kinsella
1989 (62nd)	My Left Foot	Shane Connaughton & Jim Sheridan	The memoir by Christy Brown

=== 1990s ===
Year	Film	Nominees	Source Material
1990 (63rd)	Dances with Wolves	Michael Blake	The novel by Blake
1990 (63rd)	Awakenings	Steven Zaillian	The memoir by Oliver Sacks
1990 (63rd)	Goodfellas	Nicholas Pileggi & Martin Scorsese	The book Wiseguy: Life in a Mafia Family by Pileggi
1990 (63rd)	The Grifters	Donald E. Westlake	The novel by Jim Thompson
1990 (63rd)	Reversal of Fortune	Nicholas Kazan	The memoir Reversal of Fortune: Inside the von Bülow Case by Alan Dershowitz
1991 (64th)	The Silence of the Lambs	Ted Tally	The novel by Thomas Harris
1991 (64th)	Europa Europa	Agnieszka Holland	The memoir I Was Hitler Youth Salomon by Solomon Perel
1991 (64th)	Fried Green Tomatoes	Fannie Flagg & Carol Sobieski (p.n.)	The novel Fried Green Tomatoes at the Whistle Stop Cafe by Flagg
1991 (64th)	JFK	Zachary Sklar & Oliver Stone	The memoir On the Trail of the Assassins by Jim Garrison & book Crossfire: The Plot That Killed Kennedy by Jim Marrs
1991 (64th)	The Prince of Tides	Pat Conroy & Becky Johnston	The novel by Conroy
1992 (65th)	Howards End	Ruth Prawer Jhabvala	The novel by E. M. Forster
1992 (65th)	Enchanted April	Peter Barnes	The novel by Elizabeth von Arnim
1992 (65th)	The Player	Michael Tolkin	The novel by Tolkin
1992 (65th)	A River Runs Through It	Richard Friedenberg	The novella by Norman Maclean
1992 (65th)	Scent of a Woman	Bo Goldman	The novel Il buio e il miele by Giovanni Arpino & film by Ruggero Maccari & Dino Risi
1993 (66th)	Schindler's List	Steven Zaillian	The novel Schindler's Ark by Thomas Keneally
1993 (66th)	The Age of Innocence	Jay Cocks & Martin Scorsese	The novel by Edith Wharton
1993 (66th)	In the Name of the Father	Terry George & Jim Sheridan	The memoir Proved Innocent: The Story of Gerry Conlon of the Guildford Four by Gerry Conlon
1993 (66th)	The Remains of the Day	Ruth Prawer Jhabvala	The novel by Kazuo Ishiguro
1993 (66th)	Shadowlands	William Nicholson	The play & television film by Nicholson
1994 (67th)	Forrest Gump	Eric Roth	The novel by Winston Groom
1994 (67th)	The Madness of King George	Alan Bennett	The play The Madness of George III by Bennett
1994 (67th)	Nobody's Fool	Robert Benton	The novel by Richard Russo
1994 (67th)	Quiz Show	Paul Attanasio	The book Remembering America: A Voice from the Sixties by Richard N. Goodwin
1994 (67th)	The Shawshank Redemption	Frank Darabont	The novella "Rita Hayworth and Shawshank Redemption" by Stephen King
1995 (68th)	Sense and Sensibility	Emma Thompson	The novel by Jane Austen
1995 (68th)	Apollo 13	William Broyles Jr. & Al Reinert	The memoir Lost Moon: The Perilous Voyage of Apollo 13 by Jeffrey Kluger & Jim Lovell
1995 (68th)	Babe	George Miller & Chris Noonan	The novel The Sheep-Pig by Dick King-Smith
1995 (68th)	Leaving Las Vegas	Mike Figgis	The novel by John O'Brien
1995 (68th)	Il Postino: The Postman	Screenplay: Anna Pavignano, Michael Radford, Furio & Giacomo Scarpelli & Massimo Troisi (p.n.); Story: F. & G. Scarpelli	The novel Ardiente Paciencia by Antonio Skármeta
1996 (69th)	Sling Blade	Billy Bob Thornton	The short film Some Folks Call It a Sling Blade written by Thornton
1996 (69th)	The Crucible	Arthur Miller	The play by Miller
1996 (69th)	The English Patient	Anthony Minghella	The novel by Michael Ondaatje
1996 (69th)	Hamlet	Kenneth Branagh	The play The Tragedy of Hamlet, Prince of Denmark by William Shakespeare
1996 (69th)	Trainspotting	John Hodge	The novel by Irvine Welsh
1997 (70th)	L.A. Confidential	Curtis Hanson & Brian Helgeland	The novel by James Ellroy
1997 (70th)	Donnie Brasco	Paul Attanasio	The memoir Donnie Brasco: My Undercover Life in the Mafia by Joseph D. Pistone & Richard Woodley
1997 (70th)	The Sweet Hereafter	Atom Egoyan	The novel by Russell Banks
1997 (70th)	Wag the Dog	Hilary Henkin & David Mamet	The novel American Hero by Larry Beinhart
1997 (70th)	The Wings of the Dove	Hossein Amini	The novel by Henry James
1998 (71st)	Gods and Monsters	Bill Condon	The novel Father of Frankenstein by Christopher Bram
1998 (71st)	Out of Sight	Scott Frank	The novel by Elmore Leonard
1998 (71st)	Primary Colors	Elaine May	The novel Primary Colors: A Novel of Politics by Joe Klein
1998 (71st)	A Simple Plan	Scott Smith	The novel by Smith
1998 (71st)	The Thin Red Line	Terrence Malick	The novel by James Jones
1999 (72nd)	The Cider House Rules	John Irving	The novel by Irving
1999 (72nd)	Election	Alexander Payne & Jim Taylor	The novel by Tom Perrotta
1999 (72nd)	The Green Mile	Frank Darabont	The novel by Stephen King
1999 (72nd)	The Insider	Michael Mann & Eric Roth	The article "The Man Who Knew Too Much" by Marie Brenner
1999 (72nd)	The Talented Mr. Ripley	Anthony Minghella	The novel by Patricia Highsmith

=== 2000s ===
Year	Film	Nominees	Source Material
2000 (73rd)	Traffic	Stephen Gaghan	The television series Traffik by Simon Moore
2000 (73rd)	Chocolat	Robert Nelson Jacobs	The novel by Joanne Harris
2000 (73rd)	Crouching Tiger, Hidden Dragon	Wang Hui-ling, James Schamus & Kuo Jung Tsai	The novel by Wang Dulu
2000 (73rd)	O Brother, Where Art Thou?	Joel and Ethan Coen	The epic poem the Odyssey by Homer
2000 (73rd)	Wonder Boys	Steve Kloves	The novel by Michael Chabon
2001 (74th)	A Beautiful Mind	Akiva Goldsman	The book by Sylvia Nasar
2001 (74th)	Ghost World	Daniel Clowes & Terry Zwigoff	The graphic novel by Clowes
2001 (74th)	In the Bedroom	Rob Festinger & Todd Field	The short story "Killings" by Andre Dubus
2001 (74th)	The Lord of the Rings: The Fellowship of the Ring	Philippa Boyens, Peter Jackson & Fran Walsh	The novel The Fellowship of the Ring by J. R. R. Tolkien
2001 (74th)	Shrek	Ted Elliott, Roger S. H. Schulman, Joe Stillman & Terry Rossio	The picture book by William Steig
2002 (75th)	The Pianist	Ronald Harwood	The memoir by Władysław Szpilman
2002 (75th)	About a Boy	Peter Hedges, Chris & Paul Weitz	The novel by Nick Hornby
2002 (75th)	Adaptation	Charlie & Donald Kaufman (Note: Screenwriter Charlie Kaufman is a character in his own script for Adaptation, as is his fictional twin brother Donald. The nonexistent Donald was credited as a screenwriter and was nominated for an Academy Award. The film's end credits claimed he had died during pre-production.)	The book The Orchid Thief by Susan Orlean
2002 (75th)	Chicago	Bill Condon	The musical by Fred Ebb & Bob Fosse
2002 (75th)	The Hours	David Hare	The novel by Michael Cunningham
2003 (76th)	The Lord of the Rings: The Return of the King	Philippa Boyens, Peter Jackson & Fran Walsh	The novel The Return of the King by J. R. R. Tolkien
2003 (76th)	American Splendor	Shari Springer Berman & Robert Pulcini	The comic books by Harvey Pekar & graphic novel Our Cancer Year by Pekar & Joyce Brabner
2003 (76th)	City of God	Bráulio Mantovani	The novel by Paulo Lins
2003 (76th)	Mystic River	Brian Helgeland	The novel by Dennis Lehane
2003 (76th)	Seabiscuit	Gary Ross	The book Seabiscuit: An American Legend by Laura Hillenbrand
2004 (77th)	Sideways	Alexander Payne & Jim Taylor	The novel by Rex Pickett
2004 (77th)	Before Sunset	Screenplay: Julie Delpy, Ethan Hawke & Richard Linklater; Story: Kim Krizan & Linklater	Characters from the film Before Sunrise by Krizan & Linklater
2004 (77th)	Finding Neverland	David Magee	The play The Man Who Was Peter Pan by Allan Knee
2004 (77th)	Million Dollar Baby	Paul Haggis	The short story collection Rope Burns: Stories from the Corner by F.X. Toole
2004 (77th)	The Motorcycle Diaries	José Rivera	The memoirs Traveling with Che Guevara: The Making of a Revolutionary by Alberto Granado & The Motorcycle Diaries by Che Guevara
2005 (78th)	Brokeback Mountain	Larry McMurtry & Diana Ossana	The short story by Annie Proulx
2005 (78th)	Capote	Dan Futterman	The book by Gerald Clarke
2005 (78th)	The Constant Gardener	Jeffrey Caine	The novel by John le Carré
2005 (78th)	A History of Violence	Josh Olson	The graphic novel by Vince Locke & John Wagner
2005 (78th)	Munich	Tony Kushner & Eric Roth	The book Vengeance by George Jonas
2006 (79th)	The Departed	William Monahan	The film Infernal Affairs written by Felix Chong & Alan Mak
2006 (79th)	Borat: Cultural Learnings of America for Make Benefit Glorious Nation of Kazakhstan	Screenplay: Sacha Baron Cohen, Anthony Hines, Peter Baynham & Dan Mazer; Story: Baron Cohen, Baynham, Hines & Todd Phillips	The character Borat Sagdiyev from the television series Da Ali G Show by Baron Cohen
2006 (79th)	Children of Men	Alfonso Cuarón, Timothy J. Sexton, David Arata, Mark Fergus & Hawk Ostby	The novel by P. D. James
2006 (79th)	Little Children	Todd Field & Tom Perrotta	The novel by Perrotta
2006 (79th)	Notes on a Scandal	Patrick Marber	The novel by Zoë Heller
2007 (80th)	No Country for Old Men	Coen Brothers	The novel by Cormac McCarthy
2007 (80th)	Atonement	Christopher Hampton	The novel by Ian McEwan
2007 (80th)	Away from Her	Sarah Polley	The short story "The Bear Came Over the Mountain" by Alice Munro
2007 (80th)	The Diving Bell and the Butterfly	Ronald Harwood	The memoir by Jean-Dominique Bauby
2007 (80th)	There Will Be Blood	Paul Thomas Anderson	The novel Oil! by Upton Sinclair
2008 (81st)	Slumdog Millionaire	Simon Beaufoy	The novel Q & A by Vikas Swarup
2008 (81st)	The Curious Case of Benjamin Button	Screenplay: Eric Roth; Story: Roth & Robin Swicord	The short story by F. Scott Fitzgerald
2008 (81st)	Doubt	John Patrick Shanley	The play Doubt: A Parable by Shanley
2008 (81st)	Frost/Nixon	Peter Morgan	The play by Morgan
2008 (81st)	The Reader	David Hare	The novel by Bernhard Schlink
2009 (82nd)	Precious	Geoffrey S. Fletcher	The novel Push by Sapphire
2009 (82nd)	District 9	Neill Blomkamp & Terri Tatchell	The short film Alive in Joburg by Blomkamp
2009 (82nd)	An Education	Nick Hornby	The memoir by Lynn Barber
2009 (82nd)	In the Loop	Jesse Armstrong, Simon Blackwell, Armando Iannucci & Tony Roche	The character Malcolm Tucker from the television series The Thick of It by Iannucci
2009 (82nd)	Up in the Air	Jason Reitman and Sheldon Turner	The novel by Walter Kirn

=== 2010s ===
Year	Film	Nominees	Source Material
2010 (83rd)	The Social Network	Aaron Sorkin	The book The Accidental Billionaires by Ben Mezrich
2010 (83rd)	127 Hours	Danny Boyle & Simon Beaufoy	The memoir Between a Rock and a Hard Place by Aron Ralston
2010 (83rd)	Toy Story 3	Screenplay: Michael Arndt; Story: John Lasseter, Andrew Stanton & Lee Unkrich	Characters from the film Toy Story by Pete Docter, Lasseter, Joe Ranft, & Stanton
2010 (83rd)	True Grit	Coen Brothers	The novel by Charles Portis
2010 (83rd)	Winter's Bone	Debra Granik & Anne Rosellini	The novel by Daniel Woodrell
2011 (84th)	The Descendants	Alexander Payne and Nat Faxon & Jim Rash	The novel by Kaui Hart Hemmings
2011 (84th)	Hugo	John Logan	The novel The Invention of Hugo Cabret by Brian Selznick
2011 (84th)	The Ides of March	George Clooney & Grant Heslov and Beau Willimon	The play Farragaut North by Willimon
2011 (84th)	Moneyball	Screenplay: Steven Zaillian & Aaron Sorkin; Story: Stan Chervin	The book Moneyball: The Art of Winning an Unfair Game by Michael Lewis
2011 (84th)	Tinker Tailor Soldier Spy	Bridget O'Connor (p.n.) & Peter Straughan	The novel by John le Carré
2012 (85th)	Argo	Chris Terrio	The memoir The Master of Disguise by Tony Mendez & article "The Great Escape: How the CIA Used a Fake Sci-Fi Flick to Rescue Americans from Tehran" by Joshuah Bearman
2012 (85th)	Beasts of the Southern Wild	Lucy Alibar & Benh Zeitlin	The play Juicy and Delicious by Alibar
2012 (85th)	Life of Pi	David Magee	The novel by Yann Martel
2012 (85th)	Lincoln	Tony Kushner	The book Team of Rivals: The Political Genius of Abraham Lincoln by Doris Kearns Goodwin
2012 (85th)	Silver Linings Playbook	David O. Russell	The novel by Matthew Quick
2013 (86th)	12 Years a Slave	John Ridley	The memoir by Solomon Northup
2013 (86th)	Before Midnight	Richard Linklater, Julie Delpy & Ethan Hawke	Characters from the film Before Sunrise by Kim Krizan & Linklater
2013 (86th)	Captain Phillips	Billy Ray	The memoir A Captain's Duty: Somali Pirates, Navy SEALs, and Dangerous Days at Sea by Richard Phillips & Stephan Talty
2013 (86th)	Philomena	Steve Coogan & Jeff Pope	The book The Lost Child of Philomena Lee by Martin Sixsmith
2013 (86th)	The Wolf of Wall Street	Terence Winter	The memoir by Jordan Belfort
2014 (87th)	The Imitation Game	Graham Moore	The book Alan Turing: The Enigma by Andrew Hodges
2014 (87th)	American Sniper	Jason Hall	The memoir American Sniper: The Autobiography of the Most Lethal Sniper in U.S. Military History by Jim DeFelice, Chris Kyle & Scott McEwan
2014 (87th)	Inherent Vice	Paul Thomas Anderson	The novel by Thomas Pynchon
2014 (87th)	The Theory of Everything	Anthony McCarten	The memoir Travelling to Infinity: My Life with Stephen by Jane Hawking
2014 (87th)	Whiplash	Damien Chazelle	The short film by Chazelle
2015 (88th)	The Big Short	Charles Randolph & Adam McKay	The book The Big Short: Inside the Doomsday Machine by Michael Lewis
2015 (88th)	Brooklyn	Nick Hornby	The novel by Colm Tóibín
2015 (88th)	Carol	Phyllis Nagy	The novel The Price of Salt by Patricia Highsmith
2015 (88th)	The Martian	Drew Goddard	The novel by Andy Weir
2015 (88th)	Room	Emma Donoghue	The novel by Donoghue
2016 (89th)	Moonlight	Screenplay: Barry Jenkins; Story: Tarell Alvin McCraney	The unpublished play In Moonlight Black Boys Look Blue by McCraney
2016 (89th)	Arrival	Eric Heisserer	The novella "Story of Your Life" by Ted Chiang
2016 (89th)	Fences	August Wilson (p.n.)	The play by Wilson
2016 (89th)	Hidden Figures	Allison Schroeder & Theodore Melfi	The book Hidden Figures: The American Dream and the Untold Story of the Black Women Who Helped Win the Space Race by Margot Lee Shetterly
2016 (89th)	Lion	Luke Davies	The memoir A Long Way Home by Saroo Brierley & Larry Buttrose
2017 (90th)	Call Me by Your Name	James Ivory	The novel by André Aciman
2017 (90th)	The Disaster Artist	Scott Neustadter & Michael H. Weber	The memoir The Disaster Artist: My Life Inside The Room, the Greatest Bad Movie Ever Made by Greg Sestero & Tom Bissell
2017 (90th)	Logan	Screenplay: Scott Frank & James Mangold and Michael Green; Story: Mangold	The character Wolverine from the comic books by John Romita Sr. & Len Wein
2017 (90th)	Molly's Game	Aaron Sorkin	The memoir by Molly Bloom
2017 (90th)	Mudbound	Virgil Williams & Dee Rees	The novel by Hillary Jordan
2018 (91st)	BlacKkKlansman	Charlie Wachtel & David Rabinowitz and Kevin Willmott & Spike Lee	The memoir Black Klansman by Ron Stallworth
2018 (91st)	The Ballad of Buster Scruggs	Coen Brothers	The short stories "All Gold Canyon" by Jack London & "The Gal Who Got Rattled" by Stewart Edward White
2018 (91st)	Can You Ever Forgive Me?	Nicole Holofcener & Jeff Whitty	The memoir by Lee Israel
2018 (91st)	If Beale Street Could Talk	Barry Jenkins	The novel by James Baldwin
2018 (91st)	A Star Is Born	Eric Roth and Bradley Cooper & Will Fetters	The 1954 film by Moss Hart, 1976 film by Joan Didion, John Gregory Dunne & Frank Pierson & 1937 film by Robert Carson & William A. Wellman
2019 (92nd)	Jojo Rabbit	Taika Waititi	The novel Caging Skies by Christine Leunens
2019 (92nd)	The Irishman	Steven Zaillian	The memoir I Heard You Paint Houses: Frank "The Irishman" Sheeran and Closing the Case on Jimmy Hoffa by Charles Brandt
2019 (92nd)	Joker	Todd Phillips & Scott Silver	The character from the comic books by Bill Finger, Bob Kane & Jerry Robinson
2019 (92nd)	Little Women	Greta Gerwig	The novel by Louisa May Alcott
2019 (92nd)	The Two Popes	Anthony McCarten	The play The Pope by McCarten

=== 2020s ===
Year	Film	Nominees	Source Material
2020/21 (93rd)	The Father	Christopher Hampton & Florian Zeller	The play by Zeller
2020/21 (93rd)	Borat Subsequent Moviefilm	Screenplay: Sacha Baron Cohen, Anthony Hines, Dan Swimer, Peter Baynham, Erica Rivinoja, Dan Mazer, Jena Friedman & Lee Kern; Story: Baron Cohen, Hines, Swimer & Nina Pedrad	The character Borat Sagdiyev from the television series Da Ali G Show by Baron Cohen
2020/21 (93rd)	Nomadland	Chloé Zhao	The book Nomadland: Surviving America in the Twenty-First Century by Jessica Bruder
2020/21 (93rd)	One Night in Miami...	Kemp Powers	The play by Powers
2020/21 (93rd)	The White Tiger	Ramin Bahrani	The novel by Arvind Adiga
2021 (94th)	CODA	Sian Heder	The film La Famille Bélier by Victoria Bedos, Thomas Bidegain, Stanislas Carré de Malberg & Éric Lartigau
2021 (94th)	Drive My Car	Ryusuke Hamaguchi & Takamasa Oe	The short story by Haruki Murakami
2021 (94th)	Dune	Jon Spaihts, Denis Villeneuve & Eric Roth	The novel by Frank Herbert
2021 (94th)	The Lost Daughter	Maggie Gyllenhaal	The novel by Elena Ferrante
2021 (94th)	The Power of the Dog	Jane Campion	The novel by Thomas Savage
2022 (95th)	Women Talking	Sarah Polley	The novel by Miriam Toews
2022 (95th)	All Quiet on the Western Front	Edward Berger, Lesley Paterson & Ian Stokell	The novel by Erich Maria Remarque
2022 (95th)	Glass Onion: A Knives Out Mystery	Rian Johnson	The character Benoit Blanc from the film Knives Out by Johnson
2022 (95th)	Living	Kazuo Ishiguro	The film Ikiru by Shinobu Hashimoto, Akira Kurosawa & Hideo Oguni
2022 (95th)	Top Gun: Maverick	Screenplay: Ehren Kruger, Eric Warren Singer & Christopher McQuarrie; Story: Peter Craig & Justin Marks	Characters from the film Top Gun by Jim Cash & Jack Epps Jr.
2023 (96th)	American Fiction	Cord Jefferson	The novel Erasure by Percival Everett
2023 (96th)	Barbie	Greta Gerwig & Noah Baumbach	The characters created by Ruth Handler
2023 (96th)	Oppenheimer	Christopher Nolan	The book American Prometheus: The Triumph and Tragedy of J. Robert Oppenheimer by Kai Bird & Martin J. Sherwin
2023 (96th)	Poor Things	Tony McNamara	The novel Poor Things: Episodes from the Early Life of Archibald McCandless M.D., Scottish Public Health Officer by Alasdair Gray
2023 (96th)	The Zone of Interest	Jonathan Glazer	The novel by Martin Amis
2024 (97th)	Conclave	Peter Straughan	The novel by Robert Harris
2024 (97th)	A Complete Unknown	James Mangold & Jay Cocks	The book Dylan Goes Electric! Newport, Seeger, Dylan, and the Night That Split the Sixties by Elijah Wald
2024 (97th)	Emilia Pérez	Jacques Audiard, in collaboration with Thomas Bidegain, Léa Mysius & Nicolas Livecchi	The novel Écoute by Boris Razon & the opera libretto by Audiard
2024 (97th)	Nickel Boys	RaMell Ross & Joslyn Barnes	The novel The Nickel Boys by Colson Whitehead
2024 (97th)	Sing Sing	Screenplay: Clint Bentley & Greg Kwedar; Story: Bentley, Kwedar, Clarence Maclin & John "Divine G" Whitfield	The book The Sing Sing Follies by John H. Richardson & the play Breakin' the Mummy's Code by Brent Buell
2025 (98th)	One Battle After Another	Paul Thomas Anderson	The novel Vineland by Thomas Pynchon
2025 (98th)	Bugonia	Will Tracy	The film Save the Green Planet! by Jang Joon-hwan
2025 (98th)	Frankenstein	Guillermo del Toro	The novel by Mary Shelley
2025 (98th)	Hamnet	Chloé Zhao & Maggie O'Farrell	The novel by O'Farrell
2025 (98th)	Train Dreams	Clint Bentley & Greg Kwedar	The novella by Denis Johnson

== Multiple wins and nominations ==
=== Multiple wins ===
Wins	Writer
2	Robert Bolt
2	Francis Ford Coppola
2	Christopher Hampton
2	Ruth Prawer Jhabvala
2	Joseph L. Mankiewicz
2	Alexander Payne
2	Mario Puzo
2	Alvin Sargent
2	George Seaton
2	Michael Wilson

=== Three or more nominations ===
Nominations	Writer
7	Billy Wilder
6	John Huston
6	Eric Roth
5	Richard Brooks
5	Michael Wilson
4	Carl Foreman
4	Albert Hackett
4	Charles Brackett
4	Frances Goodrich
4	Julius J. Epstein
4	Stanley Kubrick
4	Joel Coen
4	Ethan Coen
4	Steven Zaillian
4	George Seaton
3	Paul Thomas Anderson
3	Joseph L. Mankiewicz
3	Ernest Lehman
3	Robert Bolt
3	Neil Simon
3	Francis Ford Coppola
3	Alexander Payne
3	Ruth Prawer Jhabvala
3	Oliver Stone
3	Aaron Sorkin
3	Christopher Hampton
3	Claudine West
3	Alvin Sargent

== Age superlatives ==
Record	Writer	Film	Age	Ref.
Oldest winner	James Ivory	Call Me by Your Name	89 years, 270 days	
Oldest nominee	James Ivory	Call Me by Your Name	89 years, 230 days	
Youngest winner	Charlie Wachtel	BlacKkKlansman	*32 years	
Youngest nominee	Joseph L. Mankiewicz	Skippy	22 years, 236 days	

== See also ==
- Academy Award for Best Original Screenplay
- Golden Globe Award for Best Screenplay
- BAFTA Award for Best Adapted Screenplay
- Independent Spirit Award for Best Screenplay
- Critics' Choice Movie Award for Best Adapted Screenplay
- List of Big Five Academy Award winners and nominees
- List of Academy Award–nominated films
- Writers Guild of America Award for Best Adapted Screenplay
