= Dutko =

Dutko is a Polish and Ukrainian surname. Notable people with the surname include:

- Bob Dutko (born 1960), conservative Christian talk radio host in Detroit, Michigan
- Dennis Dutko (1943–1990), member of the Michigan House of Representatives from 1974 to 1989
- John W. Dutko (1916–1944), United States Army soldier
- Taras Dutko (born 1982), Ukrainian Paralympic footballer

== See also ==
- Dutko Worldwide, a Washington, DC–based bipartisan lobbying firm
- Dutka
