= The Man Who Broke 1,000 Chains =

- VHS cover
- Genre: Biography; Drama
- Based on: I Am a Fugitive from a Georgia Chain Gang! by Robert Elliott Burns
- Screenplay by: Michael Campus
- Directed by: Daniel Mann
- Starring: Val Kilmer; Charles Durning; Sônia Braga; Kyra Sedgwick; James Keach; Elisha Cook Jr. Clancy Brown
- Theme music composer: Charles Bernstein
- Country of origin: United States
- Original language: English

Production
- Producers: Yoram Ben-Ami; Michael Campus
- Production locations: Jefferson, Texas; Marshall, Texas
- Cinematography: Mikael Salomon
- Editors: Diana Friedberg; Walter Hannemann; Noel Rogers
- Running time: 115 minutes
- Production company: HBO Pictures

Original release
- Network: HBO
- Release: October 31, 1987

The Man Who Broke 1,000 Chains is a 1987 American drama film directed by Daniel Mann, written by Michael Campus, and is based on the true story I Am a Fugitive from a Georgia Chain Gang! by Robert Elliott Burns. The film stars Val Kilmer, Charles Durning, Sônia Braga, Kyra Sedgwick, James Keach, Elisha Cook Jr. and Clancy Brown. The film premiered on HBO on October 31, 1987.

== Plot ==
It is 1922. Robert Elliott Burns is having flashbacks of the horrors of World War I and is on the streets protesting for himself angry at his inability to find a job and society's apathy towards veterans. The next day, he is at his parents' home and his brother Vincent, a minister, tries to console him. Elliot says he's had enough and wants to go down to Florida to find work.

Elliot is heading to Florida by train and by the time he stops outside of Atlanta, he is now a penniless vagrant. He joins a group of vagrants around a campfire that intend to rob him, but another man saves him from it. He offers Burns a chance to make some money by robbing a country store. Burns goes with the man to rob it, but tries to back out at the last second. The man holds him at gunpoint to rob the cash register, which contains only $5. The man knocks Burns out with his weapon and runs away, leaving Burns to be apprehended by local police. He is taken to court and his lawyer tells him he should plead guilty. The judge gives him a trumped up sentence of six to ten years hard labor.

Burns is taken to the Fulton County prison camp. It is a foul place consisting of wooden shacks, stocks, sweatboxes, and pure filth. He has iron chains attached to his legs and meets the warden, Harold Hardy, a fat, angry, and spiteful man of Irish descent who hates people from the North. Hardy calls him a "Yankee" and tells him to feel guilty and get used to chain gang life to make it easier on himself. He has one of his guards, Mr. Trump, escort Burns to his quarters. Burns is introduced to a foul shack of filthy, exhausted men and meets an elderly prisoner, Pappy Glue who laughs at him when he says he didn't commit the crime he was imprisoned for. He is introduced to an inedible meal of pig fat, bitter corn pone, and sorghum molasses and gags trying to eat it and gives his plate to a veteran prisoner enjoying and devouring it.

The next morning, the men are awakened at 5 am. Burns sleeps through the removal of the chains and is thrown on the floor by Trump. The men are taken to a quarry to dig rocks out of the ground with pick axes for 15 hours a day, with only a short lunch break of red beans and corn mush. A fellow prisoner, George Seals, falls over from exhaustion. Trump kicks him in the face and Seals pleads for water and to not be hit. That night after work, Seals is hung upside down and beaten several times with a leather strap by Trump and left there overnight. By dawn, he's died from the beatings and overwork and placed in a pine box.

The next day, the men are digging out dirt with pick axes and Burns is struggling to "keep the lick" towards the end of their shift. A black prisoner sings "There's Gold in the Ground" to help the men keep working. That night, the men are having their chains checked and Warden Hardy wants to smell the men to make sure they put in a good days work. He taunts Burns, asking how much he likes the chain gang, and Burns smarts off to him about Southern hospitality. He is taken by Hardy and two guards and put into a sweatbox until the next night.

Burns is removed from the sweatbox and thrown onto the floor of the sleeping cabin. He declares to Pappy Glue he needs to get out of there. Pappy tells him he needs to get used to the life on the chain gang because the only way he is getting out is the same way as Seals.

Sometime later the men are working on the railroad putting metal ties on the tracks with sledgehammers. Burns notices Big Sam, a towering black prisoner, can really swing the hammer. During a lunch break, Burns talks Big Sam into bending his shackles with the sledgehammer by hitting it against the track. That way, Burns can slide the chains off and "hang it on a limb" or escape. Sam does it with the guards backs turned and Burns is in extreme pain from it.

That night, the men return to camp. Burns has his chains checked by Trump and they are checked out fine. Hardy again asks Burns if he likes the chain gang, but this time, Burns obediently answers yes. In his bunk, Burns removes the shackles in front of Pappy and invites him to come along. Pappy declines but gives him $5, wishing him luck.

The next day, Burns asks to "get out here", to relieve himself in the woods. While doing so, he removes his shackles, then makes a run for it. The guards and dogs run after him but he eludes them and takes a boat in the swamp to freedom. Warden Hardy is furious, screaming out to Burns that he promises to find him. Later on, that day, Burns is at a train station in Marietta and just before boarding, he thinks the police are about to catch him. But instead they catch a vagrant. He boards the train and makes it across the Tennessee border.

A year later, Burns is now living in Chicago and rents a room from Emily Pacheco, a Portuguese divorcee. She is very nice and courteous but an overly possessive woman. He types a letter to his brother Vincent about his work status and trying to get authorities to convince them of his innocence. She tells Burns to stop writing and typing so much and they go to a movie together. She keeps trying to get Burns' interest, but he's not in love with her and just doesn't feel the chemistry, but nevertheless, they sleep together after he reveals to her about trying to start a magazine business and be a statesman. He moves forward with starting the business.

Burns receives a letter from his brother Vincent that their father is dying. He goes back to New Jersey to attend the funeral afterwards. His mother is very upset that he wasn't ever able to come back to visit. Burns arrives home and Emily is all over him begging him to marry her, but he wants alone time.

One day while cleaning Burns' room, Emily comes across some papers he's been typing and there are flashbacks to his time on the chain gang being put in a sweatbox and treated like an animal. Emily is disturbed at the writing. Burns makes it home that night after a very successful day of selling his first magazine subscription and she reveals the papers he's written. He's very distressed, but she consoles him and asks him to make love to her and blackmails him into marriage.

By 1929, Burns is making it big in Chicago as a magazine publisher and motivational speaker. He's working long hours and neglecting Emily who is becoming increasingly possessive and jealous. While speaking at a dinner engagement, Burns meets a woman named Lillian Salo. After a few dates, he falls in love with her, much to Emily's dismay. He wants an amicable divorce, but she is furious and refuses.

A few days later at work, Burns is apprehended by police. Georgia authorities want Burns extradited back, but his lawyer refuses. They meet with a Georgia prison official in front of the judge assigned to hear the case. The official says if extradition is granted, he will have to go back to Georgia and serve the remainder of his sentence, plus additional time for escaping. But if he comes back voluntarily, he can serve a reduced term of 45 days and be paroled. He would also serve the time as a trustee at one of the honor farms.

Burns accepts the deal. However, he is returned to the same Fulton County camp he escaped from where Warden Hardy is waiting for him. When presented with the court agreement Burns signed in Chicago, Hardy says that "he is in Georgia now and things will be done Georgia's way." In the chow hall, Hardy berates Burns for his success and tells the prisoners that they are not to ever talk to him. Hardy also tells the guards to kill Burns if he tries to escape again.

A month later, Burns is out working and secretly asking prisoners of the whereabouts of Big Sam, the black prisoner that helped him get away, and Pappy Glue. It turns out that Big Sam clubbed a guard and was moved to another prison in Southern Georgia and Pappy Glue died from beatings soon after Burns escaped. Burns is angry and pauses for a few seconds and asks to wipe off the sweat, but Trump refuses to let him do so.

That night at dinner, Hardy reads out a list of men not doing a hard days work and for them to get their whipping. Burns is included. Burns declares it's a lie, but none of the guards or Hardy defend him. He is tied to a tree and given ten lashes.

Some time later, Lillian comes to visit Burns assuring him of clemency, parole, or pardon. They embrace and the guards try to remove him, but he resists it and is beaten and placed in the stocks. Warden Hardy informs Burns that he won't live to see himself get out despite people from up north trying to do so, and that the parole board turned him down. Burns realizes he was duped and will have to serve the remainder of his sentence.

Burns' brother comes to visit sometime later and tells him that his business is gone, but indirectly signals to him that there is money left from his business hidden inside a package of Lucky Strike cigarettes to help him get out. Mr. Rayford, another guard who works with Trump, detects Vincent giving Burns a package of cigarettes and wants to check it, but ends up taking a few of them for himself and gives Burns the package back. Later on, Burns finds over $100 in cash in it and feels it will be his ticket to freedom.

The next day, Burns is working diligently and the man shows up. He asks to "get out" to relieve himself, and Rayford allows him to do so. Burns immediately runs for the man's car and Rayford shoots at him for trying to escape but misses. Warden Hardy is more furious than ever, telling the guards they will lose their jobs if they don't catch him.

Some time later, Burns is seen typing his new book which says that he is a fugitive, he moves around a lot and can't keep jobs for long. The book he is writing depicts his time on the chain gang and its horrific conditions. He specifically mentions the men who died while he was imprisoned and dedicates the book to them. Burns briefly visits his brother about his situation, who tells him there are several people asking to have movie rights to the book. Burns grants his brother Power of Attorney before disappearing into the night.

Some time later, Burns visits his former love Lillian, who is now married. She says she had been praying for him the entire time and she is happy to see him alive and well. He later goes to a local library to read his published book and hears on the radio that it will be made into a movie. Burns anonymously attends a screening of the movie I Am a Fugitive from a Chain Gang and has flashbacks to his time there. He is satisfied to find that the movie accurately reflects what he has been through. Phone calls, telegrams, and letters flood the Georgia Department of Corrections demanding a reform of the prison system.

The film ends with scenes of the Fulton County Camp now empty and abandoned. It is noted that Robert Elliot Burns finally received a pardon after many years of struggle in 1944 and that the Georgia chain gang system was abolished.

== Cast ==
- Val Kilmer as Robert Elliott Burns / Eliot Roberts
- Charles Durning as Warden Hardy
- Sônia Braga as Emily Del Pino Pacheco
- Kyra Sedgwick as Lillian Salo
- James Keach as Father Vincent Godfrey Burns
- Elisha Cook Jr. as "Pappy Glue"
- Clancy Brown as Flagg
- William Sanderson as Trump
- Taj Mahal as "Bones"
- Taylor Presnell as George Seales
- Paul Benjamin as Sam "Big Sam"
- Bill Bolender as Rayford
- Esther Benson as Mother Burns
- Burt Conway as Father Burns
