= Beverly National Cemetery =

Historic veterans cemetery in Burlington County, New Jersey

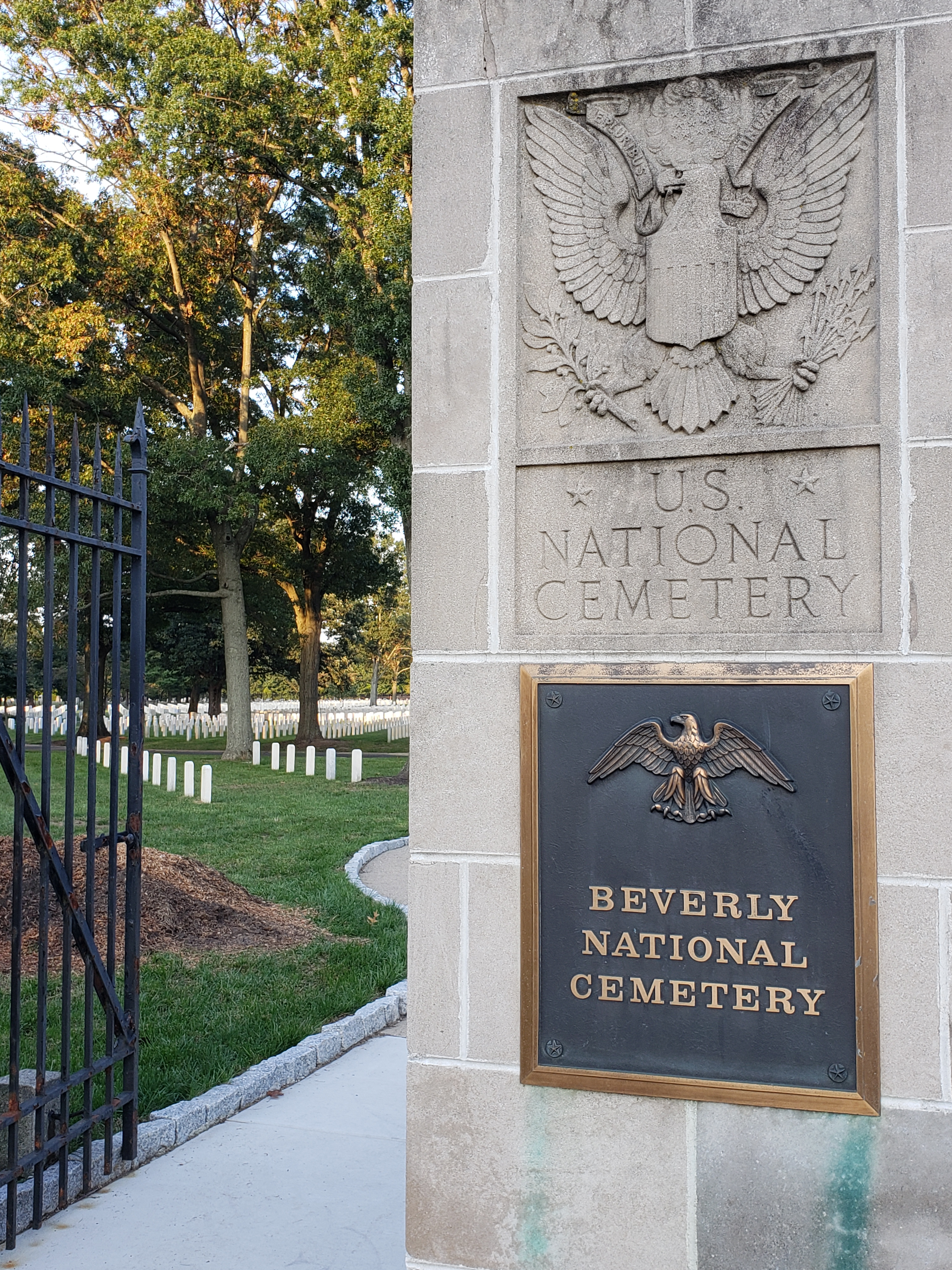
- Interactive map of Beverly National Cemetery

Details
- Established: 1863
- Location: Edgewater Park, New Jersey
- Country: United States
- Type: Military veterans
- Owned by: US Department of Veterans Affairs
- Size: 64.6 acres (26.1 ha)
- No. of graves: >50,000
- Website: Beverly National Cemetery
- Find a Grave: Beverly National Cemetery
- Beverly National Cemetery
- U.S. National Register of Historic Places
- Location within Burlington County, New Jersey Location within New Jersey Location within the United States
- Nearest city: Edgewater Park Township, New Jersey
- Coordinates: 40°03′13″N 74°54′57″W
- Area: 64.4 acres (261,000 m^{2})
- Built: 1864
- Architect: Meigs, Montgomery C.
- Architectural style: Late Victorian, Second Empire
- MPS: Civil War Era National Cemeteries MPS
- NRHP reference No.: 97001201
- Added to NRHP: October 15, 1997

Beverly National Cemetery is a United States National Cemetery located in Edgewater Park Township, in Burlington County, New Jersey, United States. Administered by the United States Department of Veterans Affairs, it encompasses 64.6 acres (26.1 ha), and as 2021 had over 50,000 interments.

== History ==
The original cemetery was only a single acre off of Beverly's Monument Cemetery, purchased from a local resident in 1863 for the purpose of interring Union Army casualties who died in the Beverly United States Army hospital (run for the duration of the Civil War). Additional land was acquired in 1936, 1937, 1948, and 1951. It served as a burial ground only for those veterans who died in nearby hospitals, until space in the nearby Philadelphia National Cemetery became limited, and many interments that would have been made there were made at Beverly instead. Beverly National Cemetery was listed on the National Register of Historic Places in 1997.

== Notable interments ==
- Medal of Honor recipients
  - Hospital Corpsman Third Class Edward Clyde Benfold, recipient for action in the Korean War
  - Sergeant First Class Nelson Vogel Brittin, recipient for action in the Korean War
  - Private First Class John W. Dutko, recipient for action in Italy during World War II
  - First Sergeant Bernard Strausbaugh, recipient for action at the Second Battle of Petersburg during the Civil War.
- Others
  - Robert Elliott Burns, author who wrote I Am a Fugitive from a Georgia Chain Gang!
  - Joshua Crittenden "Josh" Cody, American athlete and coach
  - Les Damon, actor
  - Socks Seibold, Major League Baseball player

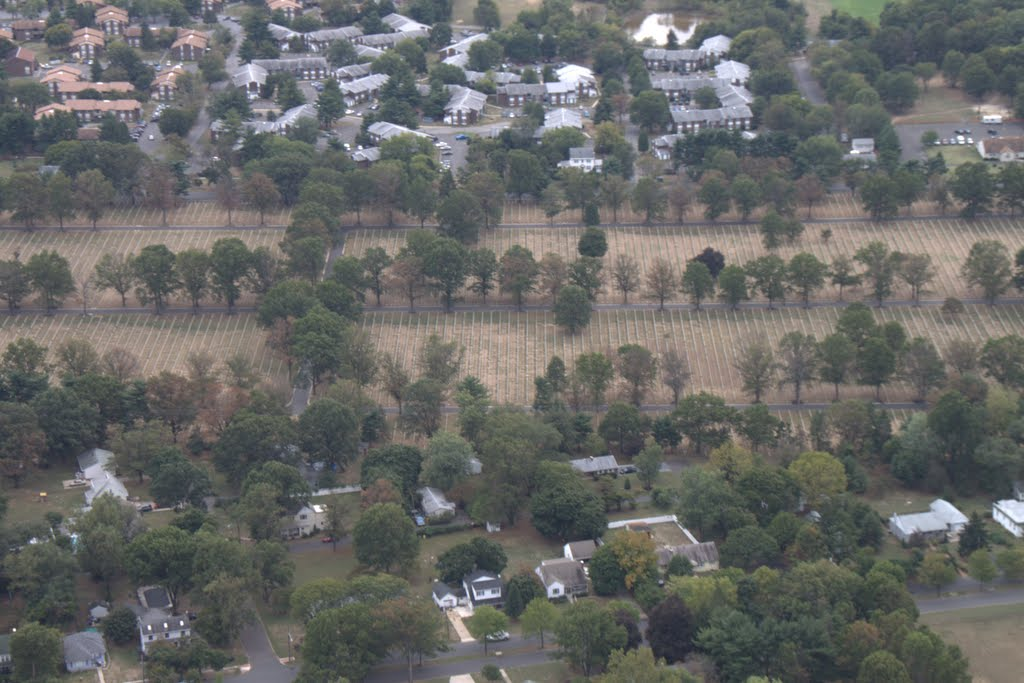
Aerial view of Beverly National Cemetery.

== See also ==
- National Register of Historic Places listings in Burlington County, New Jersey
