= Robert Elliott Burns =

American chain gang escapee

- Burns at a court hearing
- Born: May 10, 1892; New York City, U.S.
- Died: June 5, 1955 (aged 63); East Orange, New Jersey, U.S.
- Resting place: Beverly National Cemetery
- Notable work: I Am a Fugitive from a Georgia Chain Gang! (1932)
- Spouses: Emily Del Pino Pacheco (m. 1926; div. 1929) Clara Cecilia Graykowski (m. 1932)
- Children: Robert; Frances; Caroline; Suzanna
- Military career
- Allegiance: United States
- Branch: United States Army
- Rank: Private
- Unit: 14th Engineer Battalion
- Conflicts: World War I; Battle of Château-Thierry; Battle of Saint-Mihiel

Robert Elliott Burns (May 10, 1892 – June 5, 1955) was an American World War I veteran known for escaping from a Georgia chain gang and publishing the memoir, I Am a Fugitive from a Georgia Chain Gang!, exposing the cruelty and injustice of the chain gang system. His memoir and story was adapted into the similarly titled 1932 Oscar-nominated film I Am a Fugitive from a Chain Gang, which received nominations for Best Picture and Best Actor for star Paul Muni.

== Life and career ==
Robert Burns was born in 1892 in New York City. In 1912, he left his family and drifted throughout the United States as a laborer. Two days after the United States entered World War I on April 6, 1917, he enlisted in the U.S. Army as a combat medic. Burns was assigned to the 14th Engineer Battalion and was present for many of the United States' major engagements in World War I, including the Battle of Chateau-Thierry and the Battle of Saint-Mihiel. He was discharged at the rank of private.

Upon his return from Europe, he suffered deeply from what his brother, Vincent Burns, deemed "a typical shell-shock case". His deteriorating psychological condition, coupled with his inability to recover his pre-war job, or the wages he was earning, caused Burns to become a drifter again.

=== The chain gang ===
In 1921, Burns found himself in Atlanta, Georgia. He was tricked into participating in a robbery of a grocery store, which netted the robbers only $5.81 (equivalent to $105 in 2025). Burns was convicted and sentenced to six to 10 years of hard labor on a Georgia chain gang. In 1921, since Georgia did not have a state prison, Burns was sentenced to a different kind of incarceration: convict leasing. As a member of Georgia's convict lease system, Burns was forced to complete back-breaking labor for the profit of the state. He endured the most inhumane of conditions as a convict lease laborer: endless labor, inadequate shelter, constant beatings, and insufficient food.

Burns escaped from the chain gang with the help of another inmate, who struck his restraints with a sledgehammer, bending and weakening them. He evaded the guards while they thought he was taking his five-minute rest. Burns made his way to Chicago, where he eventually became the editor and publisher of Greater Chicago Magazine. In this magazine, he published articles about his life as a member of a Georgia chain gang and the brutality he endured. During his stay in Chicago, he became involved with a divorcee named Emily Del Pino Pacheco, from whom he rented a room. She supported Burns in his real estate plans and helped him set up his magazine with her savings. They married in 1926.

Three years later, he sought a divorce in order to marry Lillian Salo. The 22-year-old woman was 16 years his junior. His wife sued for divorce. Within a month Burns was apprehended, pending extradition back to Georgia. Burns claimed that his wife had been responsible for the anonymous letter that tipped off authorities there, but she denied it. Owing to his status in the community, many people helped him fight extradition to Georgia. In spite of this help and much support from all around the country, the ruling went against him.

=== Second imprisonment ===
Burns returned to Georgia in June 1929 to finish his prison term. After initially serving in Campbell County Camp, where he was given relatively light work as a painter, he was transferred to Troup County Prison Camp. He was assigned to road work, which was much tougher. He did not qualify to apply for parole until a year after his return. After several failures to gain approval for parole, on September 4, 1930, Burns again escaped. He waited until he had earned the guards' trust and could obtain the privilege of not being chained. He paid off a local farmer with money he had received from his brother living in Newark, and headed to New Jersey.

Burns could not duplicate his Chicago success in New Jersey, due to the Great Depression. He took on odd jobs around the state for a few years, all the while writing his memoir, I am a Fugitive from a Georgia Chain Gang! It was serialized in 1931 and published as a book in 1932. Movie rights had already been purchased and the book adapted for a movie of nearly the same name.

=== Fame and freedom ===
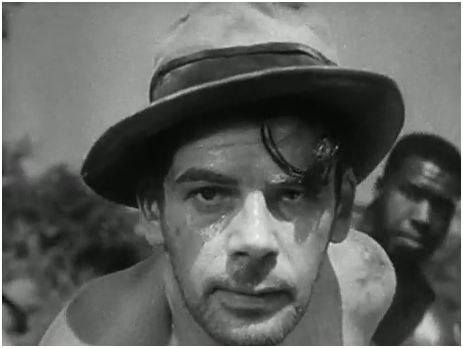
Paul Muni portraying Burns in the film version of his memoirs

In January 1932, a cinematic version of Burns's memoir was released by Warner Bros. under the slightly altered title, I Am a Fugitive from a Chain Gang, starring Paul Muni. Burns was a consultant on the set of the film. According to a review in The New York Times, the movie was "an exciting, thrilling tale" that "shocks and horrifies."

The success of the movie led Burns to make more frequent public appearances condemning the use of chain gangs in the South. Burns's exposure resulted in his being arrested again, in Newark in December 1932. But, the governor of New Jersey refused to extradite him to Georgia, since his book and a movie had been released and public opinion was firmly against the idea. He also married Clara with whom he had four children.

In 1943, Burns met newly elected Georgia governor Ellis Arnall in New York and requested a pardon. Arnall had Burns return to Georgia in November 1945 to face the parole board, and stood by his side as his counsel. The board commuted Burns's sentence to time served.

=== Legacy ===
Burns died in 1955, aged 63, at the East Orange Veterans' Hospital in East Orange, New Jersey, following a long illness, believed to be cancer.

Burns' book is considered part of a long American tradition of reform literature intended to spur the American public to opposition of an issue. Some examples of this literature are Uncle Tom's Cabin, The Jungle, and The Other America. Burns's book and subsequent movie are largely credited with the abolition of the chain gang system in the South.

== Media ==
- I Am a Fugitive from a Georgia Chain Gang! (Vanguard Press, 1932)

The book has been made into two movies:

- I Am a Fugitive from a Chain Gang (First National, 1932)
- The Man Who Broke 1,000 Chains (HBO, 1987)
