= Stranger on the Prowl =

1952 film directed by Joseph Losey

Imbarco a mezzanotte
- US theatrical release poster
- Directed by: Joseph Losey
- Screenplay by: Ben Barzman
- Based on: "La bouteille du lait" by Noël Calef
- Produced by: Noël Calef; Andrea Forzano; Albert Salvatore
- Starring: Paul Muni; Joan Lorring; Vittorio Manunta
- Cinematography: Henri Alekan
- Edited by: Thelma Connell
- Music by: Giulio Cesare Sonzogno
- Production companies: Riviera Films; Tirrenia Film
- Distributed by: United Artists
- Release dates: March 12, 1952 (Italy); November 9, 1953 (US)
- Running time: 90 minutes
- Countries: Italy; United States
- Language: English

Stranger on the Prowl (Italian: Imbarco a mezzanotte, lit. 'Boarding at midnight') is a 1952 film noir directed by Joseph Losey, written by Ben Barzman, and starring Paul Muni, Joan Lorring, and Vittorio Manuta.

A co-production between Italy and the United States, the picture was the first to be made abroad by any blacklisted Hollywood director. Due to the blacklist, both Losey and Barzman were uncredited.

== Plot ==
A disillusioned vagrant accidentally kills a shop owner, and is joined in his flight by a rebellious youngster who is fleeing from apprehension for stealing milk from the same shop.[1]

== Cast ==
- Paul Muni as the stranger
- Joan Lorring as Angela
- Vittorio Manunta as Giacomo
- Luisa Rossi as Giacomo's mother
- Aldo Silvani as Peroni
- Arnoldo Foà as Inspector
- Alfredo Varelli as Patrolman
- Héléna Manson as Clerk
- Enrico Glori as Signor Pucci
- Linda Sini as Signora Raffetto

== Production ==
The film was Joseph Losey's first film after leaving the United States due to the Hollywood blacklist the year prior, and the first film overall by a blacklisted American filmmaker produced overseas. As the film was being distributed by American studio United Artists, both Losey and Ben Barzman were fronted by Italian filmmaker Andrea Forzano. Losey replaced the original director, Bernard Vorhaus, also a blacklistee.

The film was based on an unpublished short story by Bulgarian-French author Noël Calef, whose writings were later adapted into the films Elevator to the Gallows and Tiger Bay. Calef also produced the film, his only such credit.

Paul Muni traveled to Italy to star in the film partly as an act of solidarity and support for blacklisted friends living there in exile. This was his first film role in over eight years, following 1946's Angel on My Shoulder.

== Release ==
The film premiered in Italy on March 12, 1952.

== Reception ==
=== Retrospective appraisal ===
“Stranger on the Prowl, made at the end of the neorealist revolution in Italian cinema, has the grainy texture and the naturalistic mood of the films by De Sica or Rosellini. Since it tells the story of a man and a boy, it contains echoes of De Sica’s The Bicycle Thief (1948). - Film critic Foster Hirsch in Joseph Losey (1980)

Film historian Foster Hirsch considers the Stranger on the Prowl deserving of “more attention than it has received.”

The film, with its location shooting and large cast that included some non-professional actors, is clearly influenced by Italian neorealism and consequently is “markedly different” in its mise-en-scene from Losey’s previous Hollywood, and his subsequent British produced films, notably lacking in their claustrophobic “closed qualities.” Hirsch writes:

The film is set in the cavernous, bombed-out [word missing] of a severely depleted post-war Italian slum…as in the major neo-realist films, Losey frames his action with a sense of the ongoing flow of life. The screen is almost always filled with background movement… Losey’s film “redeems” physical reality with its “open compositions.”

Hirsch reserves special mention for American film star Paul Muni, who brings pathos and genuine dignity to the impoverished outcast and fugitive he portrays.

== Sources ==
- Callahan, Dan. 2003. Losey, Joseph. Senses of Cinema, March 2003. Great Directors Issue 25.https://www.sensesofcinema.com/2003/great-directors/losey/#:~:text=The%20dominant%20themes%20of%20Losey's,love%20story%20in%20his%20films. Accessed 12 October, 2024.
- Hirsch, Foster. 1980. Joseph Losey. Twayne Publishers, Boston, Massachusetts. ISBN 0-8057-9257-0
- Palmer, James and Riley, Michael. 1993. The Films of Joseph Losey. Cambridge University Press, Cambridge, England. ISBN 0-521-38386-2
