= Seven Faces =

1929 film

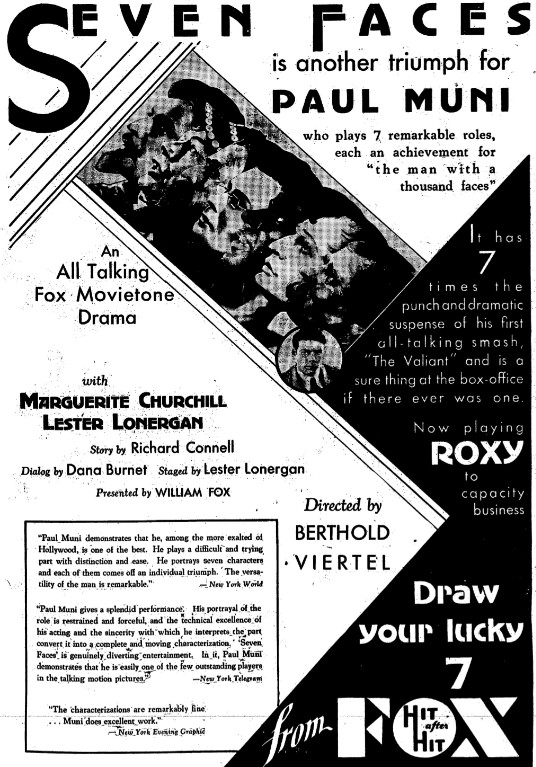
- Advertisement in Variety
- Directed by: Berthold Viertel; Lester Lonergan (dialogue director)
- Screenplay by: Dana Burnet
- Based on: original story by Richard Connell
- Produced by: William Fox (president); George E. Middleton (associate producer)
- Starring: Paul Muni; Marguerite Churchill
- Cinematography: Joseph H. August; Al Brick
- Edited by: Edwin Robbins
- Production company: Fox Film Corporation
- Distributed by: Fox Film Corporation
- Release dates: November 15, 1929 (New York City); December 1, 1929
- Running time: 78 minutes
- Country: United States
- Language: English

Seven Faces is a 1929 American sound (All-Talking) pre-Code drama film with fantasy elements that was released by Fox Film Corporation in the Fox Movietone sound-on-film system on December 1, 1929. Based upon the piece of short fiction "A Friend of Napoleon" which was published in the June 30, 1923, issue of The Saturday Evening Post magazine by popular writer Richard Connell (whose best known work, The Most Dangerous Game, was filmed three years later), it was directed by Berthold Viertel and stars Paul Muni in his second screen appearance. Seven Faces is a lost film, with no excerpts from its footage known to exist.

== Plot ==
A common convention in the early decades of newspaper and magazine film reviews was to describe in the write-up the entire storyline including, in a substantial number of instances, the ending, thus unintentionally enabling subsequent generations of readers to reconstruct a lost film's contents. True to form, those who evaluated Seven Faces, such as Mordaunt Hall of The New York Times, did go into considerable detail regarding plot twists, as related herein below.

Papa Chibou, the elderly caretaker of Musée Pratouchy, a Parisian wax museum, feels a strong kinship with the figures, particularly with that of Napoleon. He spots at the waxworks a romantic young couple, Georges, a lawyer, and Helene, the daughter of a stern judge who disapproves of his daughter's choice and forbids her to see Georges. Papa Chibou suggests to them that they can still stay in touch, without disobeying her father's directive not to speak with each other, by placing secret personal messages in the pockets of Napoleon's uniform. However, a missing letter and confusion in communication causes Georges to arrive at the mistaken conclusion that Helene has redirected her affections towards a foolish young man, who is unworthy of her and excessively preoccupied with his stylish personal appearance and elegant clothing.

Seeing their lovers' quarrel, Papa Chibou attempts to mollify the heated language, but George and Helene rebuff his soothing words by telling him not to interfere, since as an old man he knows nothing of love. Saddened by this rejection, he dreamily imagines that seven of the museum's waxworks come to life and offer philosophical advice on the intricacies of courtship and love. Don Juan, the legendary 17th-century libertine, Napoleon (1769–1821), Franz Schubert (1797–1828), African American boxer Joe Gans (1874–1910), Willie Smith, a Cockney costermonger who became a music hall attraction after winning a lottery-auction known as Calcutta Sweepstakes and a Parisian hypnotist whose purported mastery of dark arts earned him the stage name Diablero as well as Catherine the Great (1729–1796) speak to Papa Chibou, each in his or her own unique manner and accent, providing insight and personal experience in their reflections on this very intimate topic.

The wax museum is unable to support itself and has to close. The owner, Monsieur Pratouchy puts the figures up for auction and Papa Chibou bids his life savings to acquire Napoleon, but is outbid. He then decides to take the waxwork and, while struggling to carry the heavy and unwieldy life-size figure in his arms through Paris streets, attracts public attention and is arrested for theft.

At his trial, the judge is Helene's father, while the defense attorney is Georges, the young romantic, who delivers an impassioned summation vividly describing how the defendant was overcome by patriotic fervor over Napoleon's victories and his contributions to the glory and grandeur of his beloved France. Although the judge finds Papa Chibou guilty, as required by law, he is so impressed that he suspends the punishment and contributes towards the purchase price of the figure which is given to Papa Chibou who then confesses that as an uneducated man he never knew that Napoleon had accomplished all those great deeds and that he simply formed a close attachment to him. "Then who did you think Napoleon was", he is asked. "A sort of murderer", he replies. At that point, as he straightens Napoleon's pockets, Papa Chibou discovers the overlooked letter which explains and resolves Georges' and Helene's misunderstanding, thus allowing the young lovers an opportunity to declare their true feelings, with her father's blessing.

== Cast ==
- Paul Muni as Papa Chibou as well as six (Don Juan, Napoleon, Franz Schubert, Joe Gans, Willie Smith and Diablero) of the seven wax figures. The seventh figure, Catherine the Great, is portrayed by director Berthold Viertel's actress-screenwriter wife, billed, at the bottom of the cast list, as Salka Stenermann.
- Marguerite Churchill as Helene Berthelot
- Lester Lonergan as Judge Berthelot
- Russell Gleason as Georges Dufeyel
- Gustav von Seyffertitz as Monsieur Pratouchy
- Eugenie Besserer as Madame Vallon
- Walter Rogers as Henri Vallon
- Salka Stenermann as Catherine the Great

== Production ==
The female lead, 18-year-old Marguerite Churchill, was also Muni's co-star, six months earlier, in his first film, Fox's The Valiant, although they were not cast as a romantic couple in either production. Their sole scene together in The Valiant comes at the end of the film and consists of an extended dialogue sequence in which condemned prisoner Muni, in reality Churchill's long-lost older brother, seeks to protect her and their mother, who was too infirm to make the long trip to the prison, from anguish at his execution by attempting to convince her that even though he is not who they may believe him to be, he does recollect, upon hearing her say the brother's name, witnessing his heroic final moments as a fellow soldier during the Great War.

Before filming started, the early working title for Seven Faces was "Lover Come Back" and a full color poster was created using that appellation, with a note stating "(Temporary Title)" appended directly underneath. Additionally, while the poster was already intended, even in the film's pre-production stage, to highlight, in fonts smaller than those reserved for Muni's billing, the name of second-billed ingenue Marguerite Churchill, the listing for her male counterpart, playing young lawyer Georges, is indicated beneath her name as Owen Davis, Jr., thus pointing out the fact that subsequent unspecified casting revisions led to the 22-year-old actor's replacement with another 22-year-old, Russell Gleason.

Impressed by Paul Muni's gift for characterization under makeup, which led a number of critics to designate him "a young Lon Chaney", Fox prepared another such vehicle for him — two years before MGM's opulent 1932 production, Rasputin and the Empress, with studio contractee Lionel Barrymore as "The Mad Monk", Muni was set to portray the character in a production, helmed by top director Raoul Walsh, with a title which intended to utilize another of Rasputin's nicknames, The Holy Devil. A full color poster, similar to the one for Lover Come Back (Seven Faces), was produced, but creative disagreements between Muni and the studio caused him to cancel plans for any future projects with Fox. Going back to the Broadway stage, he starred in brief runs of This One Man (1930) and Rock Me, Julie (1931), as well as in the hit play, Counsellor-at-Law (1931–32 and 1932–33), with the in-between time enabling him to star in two 1932 hit films, Howard Hughes' Scarface and Warner Bros.' I Am a Fugitive from a Chain Gang. As an example of how prolific the output of actors who worked exclusively in film during this era could be, in the same four years (1929–32) that gave Muni the opportunity to complete four films, his co-star in two of those, Marguerite Churchill, had leading or co-starring roles in fourteen features and two comedy shorts.

== See also ==
- List of early sound feature films (1926–1929)
