= Actor: The Life and Times of Paul Muni =

1974 biography by Jerome Lawrence

- Author: Jerome Lawrence
- Publication date: 1974

Actor: The Life and Times of Paul Muni is a 1974 biography of Hollywood actor Paul Muni, written by Jerome Lawrence. Ira Berkow of The Sumter Daily Item called the book "fine, balanced". A two-hour special based on the book, was made by National Broadcasting Company (NBC).
