= Dutka =

Dutkiewicz is a Polish surname. Notable people with the surname include:

- Bronisław Dutka
- Mike Dutka

== See also ==
- Dudka
- Dutko
