= USS Benfold =

US Navy destroyer

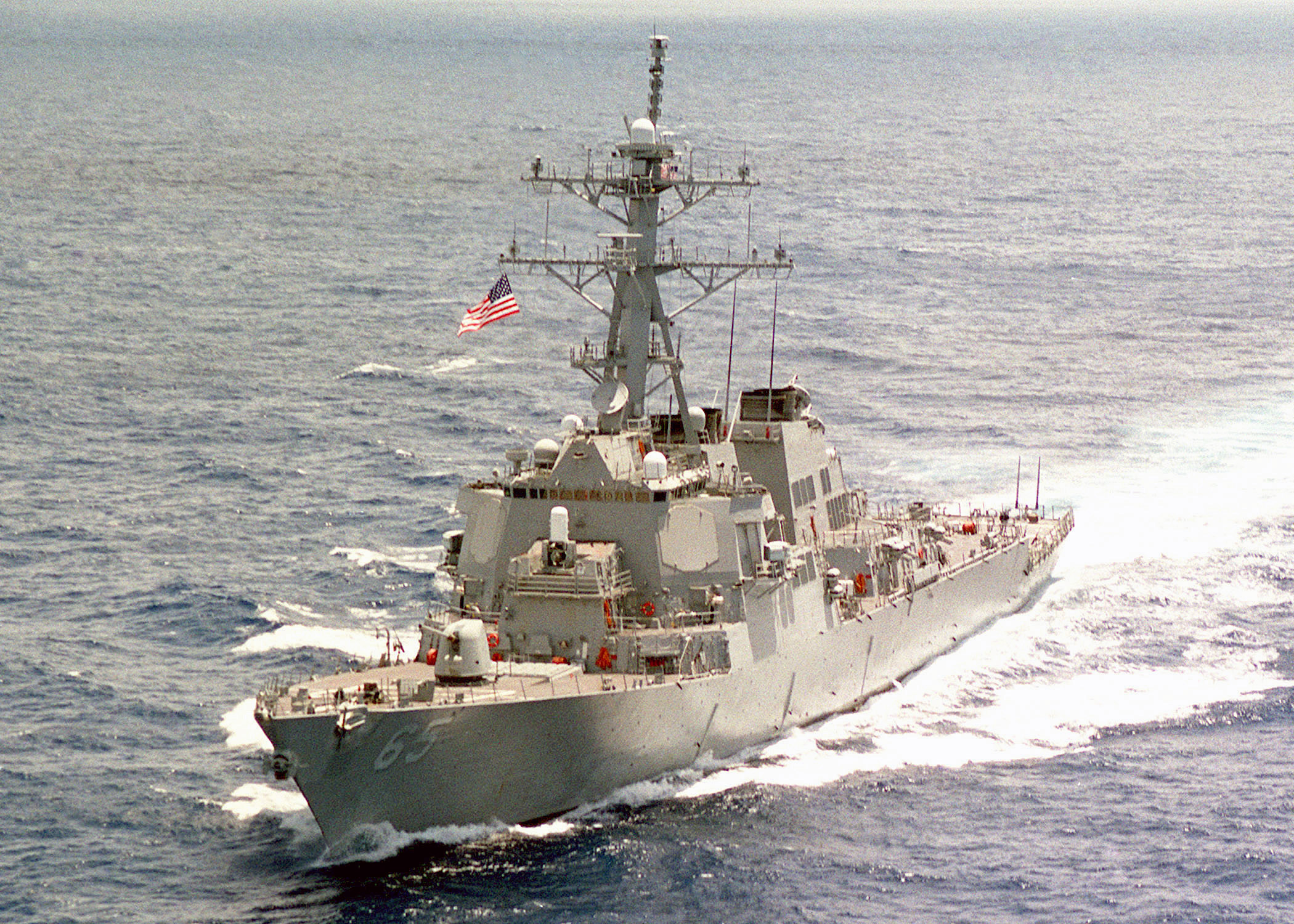
- Port bow view of USS Benfold (DDG-65) underway in the South Pacific Ocean.

History

United States
- Name: Benfold
- Namesake: Edward Clyde Benfold
- Ordered: 16 January 1991
- Builder: Ingalls Shipbuilding
- Laid down: 27 September 1993
- Launched: 9 November 1994
- Commissioned: 30 March 1996
- Home port: Naval Station Everett
- Identification: IMO number: 9457701; MMSI number: 338816000; Callsign: NECB; Hull number: DDG-65
- Motto: Onward with valor!
- Honors and awards: See Awards
- Status: in active service
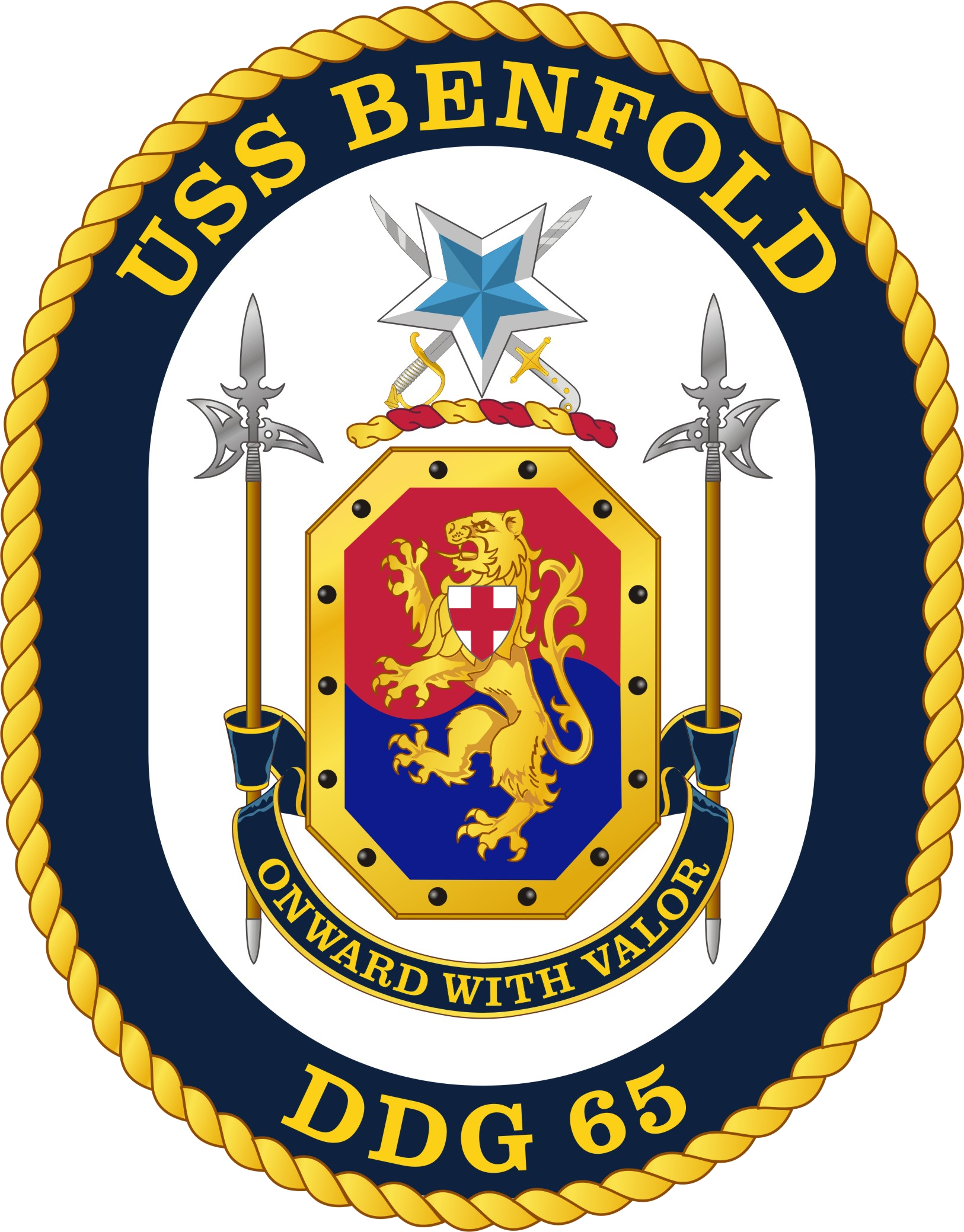
- Badge

General characteristics
- Class & type: Arleigh Burke-class destroyer
- Displacement: Light: approx. 6,800 long tons (6,900 t); Full: approx. 8,900 long tons (9,000 t)
- Length: 505 ft (154 m)
- Beam: 59 ft (18 m)
- Draft: 31 ft (9.4 m)
- Installed power: 3 × Rolls-Royce AG9130F (Allison 501-K34) (2.5 MW Each)
- Propulsion: 2 × shafts
- Speed: In excess of 30 kn (56 km/h; 35 mph)
- Range: 4,400 nmi (8,100 km; 5,100 mi) at 20 kn (37 km/h; 23 mph)
- Complement: 33 commissioned officers; 38 chief petty officers; 210 enlisted personnel
- Sensors & processing systems: AN/SPY-1D PESA 3D radar (Flight I, II, IIA); AN/SPY-6(V)1 AESA 3D radar (Flight III); AN/SPS-67(V)3 or (V)5 surface search radar (DDG-51 – DDG-118); AN/SPQ-9B surface search radar (DDG-119 onward); AN/SPS-73(V)12 surface search/navigation radar (DDG-51 – DDG-86); BridgeMaster E surface search/navigation radar (DDG-87 onward); 3 × AN/SPG-62 fire-control radar; Mk 46 optical sight system (Flight I, II, IIA); Mk 20 electro-optical sight system (Flight III); AN/SQQ-89 ASW combat system: AN/SQS-53C sonar array; AN/SQR-19 tactical towed array sonar (Flight I, II, IIA); TB-37U multi-function towed array sonar (DDG-113 onward); AN/SQQ-28 LAMPS III shipboard system
- Electronic warfare & decoys: AN/SLQ-32 electronic warfare suite; AN/SLQ-25 Nixie torpedo countermeasures; Mk 36 Mod 12 decoy launching systems; Mk 53 Nulka decoy launching systems; Mk 59 decoy launching systems
- Armament: Guns: 1 × 5-inch (127 mm)/54 mk 45 mod 1/2 (lightweight gun); 2 × 20 mm (0.8 in) Phalanx CIWS; 2 × 25 mm (0.98 in) Mk 38 machine gun system; 4 × 0.50 inches (12.7 mm) caliber guns; Missiles: 2 × Mk 141 Harpoon anti-ship missile launcher; 1 × 29-cell, 1 × 61-cell (90 total cells) Mk 41 vertical launching system (VLS): RIM-66M surface-to-air missile; RIM-156 surface-to-air missile; RIM-161 anti-ballistic missile; BGM-109 Tomahawk cruise missile; RUM-139 vertical launch ASROC; Torpedoes: 2 × Mark 32 triple torpedo tubes: Mark 46 lightweight torpedo; Mark 50 lightweight torpedo; Mark 54 lightweight torpedo
- Aircraft carried: 1 × Sikorsky MH-60R

USS Benfold (DDG-65) is a Flight I Arleigh Burke-class destroyer in the United States Navy. She is a multi-mission platform capable of anti-aircraft warfare (AAW) with the Aegis Combat System suite and anti-aircraft missiles, anti-submarine warfare (ASW), with a towed sonar array and ASROC missiles, anti-surface warfare (ASUW) with Harpoon missiles, and strategic land strike using Tomahawk missiles. Benfold was one of the first ships fitted with the Aegis Ballistic Missile Defense System and during the 2010 Stellar Daggers exercise was the first ship to simultaneously engage a ballistic missile and a cruise missile.

Former Benfold commanding officers include Admiral Mark Ferguson, Admiral Michael Gilday, Vice Admiral Thomas H. Copeman III, and author Captain D. Michael Abrashoff.

== Design, construction and improvements ==
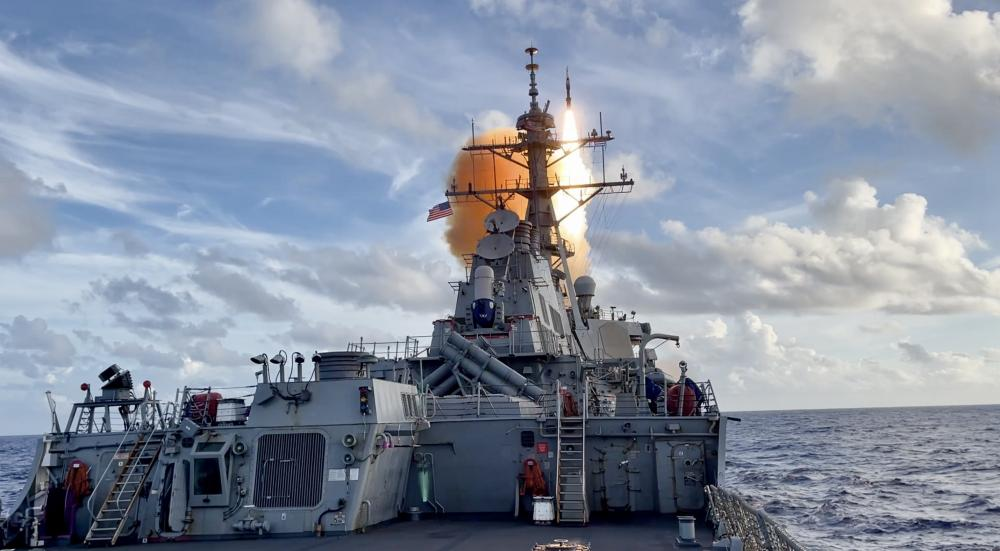
Benfold launches a Standard Missile (SM) 6 during the coordinated multi-domain, multi-axis, long-range maritime strikes against Ex-USS Vandegrift as part of Valiant Shield 2022 (VS 22).

Built by the Ingalls Shipbuilding Corporation in Pascagoula, Mississippi, Benfold is the 15th of a planned 90 Arleigh Burke-class guided missile destroyers. Named for posthumous Korean War United States Navy Medal of Honor recipient Hospital Corpsman Third Class Edward Clyde Benfold, she joined the U.S. Pacific Fleet for service on 30 March 1996.

Equipped with the Aegis air-defense system and the Mark-41 Vertical Launch System for multiple types of guided missiles, Benfold is capable of defensive and offensive operations against warplanes, anti-ship missiles, surface ships, submarines, and shore targets. In addition to her missiles, she carries one 5-inch rapid-fire naval gun for action against surface ships and for shore bombardment. She also carries anti-submarine torpedoes, and two Phalanx CIWS anti-missile guns. She has a flight deck for MH-60R/S Seahawk Helicopters and is capable of refueling and re-arming these helicopters, but she does not have a hangar for storing and maintaining helicopters.

=== Modernization 2011 ===
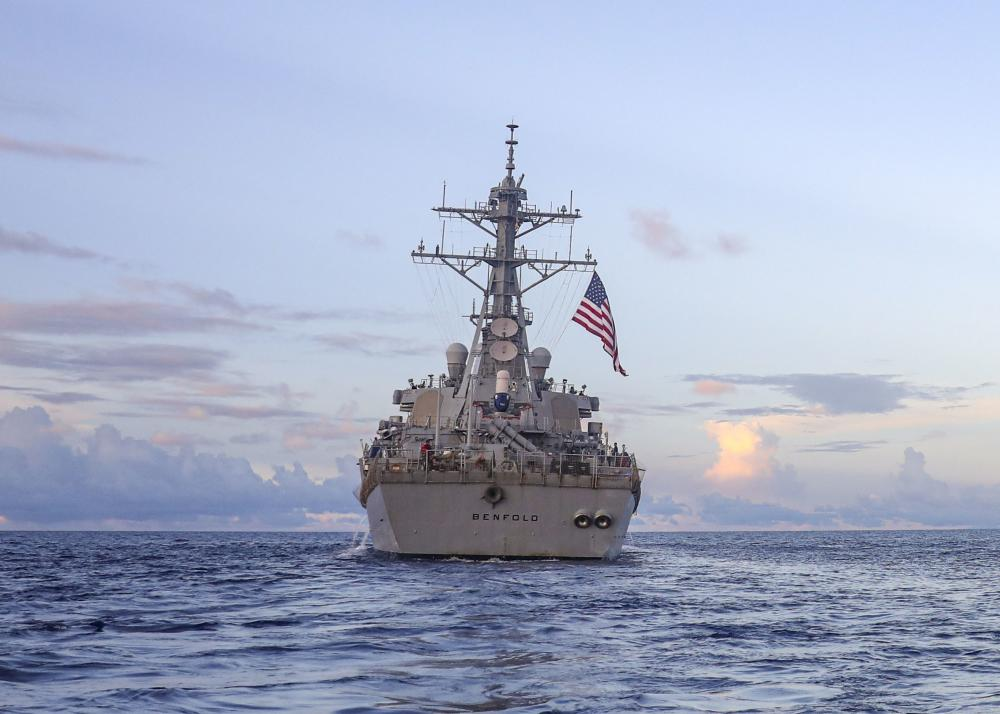
Benfold conducts routine underway operations in the Philippine Sea, 24 June 2022.

In 2011, Benfold entered drydock at BAE Systems, San Diego to receive an extensive $32 million mid-life upgrade. The hull mechanical and electrical (HM&E) upgrades included a fully integrated bridge, improved machinery and damage control, quality of life improvements, an advanced galley, and commercial-off-the-shelf computing equipment.

=== Modernization 2013 ===
In 2013, Benfold underwent extensive combat systems upgrades to include the installation of Aegis Baseline 9C, Ballistic Missile Defense version 5.0, A(V) 15 SONAR Suite, and also became Cooperative Engagement Capability (CEC) capable.

== Service history ==
=== Deployments ===
- 14 August 1997 to 19 February 1998 – Persian Gulf
- 18 June 1999 to 17 December 1999 – Pacific Ocean/Persian Gulf
- 13 March 2001 to 15 September 2001 – Gulf
- 18 October 2004 to 1 March 2005
- 13 September to 2006 13 March 2007
- 4 May 2008 to 3 November 2008
- 8 September 2009 to 16 March 2010
- 15 June 2012 to 11 January 2013 – Persian Gulf
- 2 October 2015 to present – U.S. 7th Fleet, Yokosuka, Japan

=== Naval exercises 2012 ===
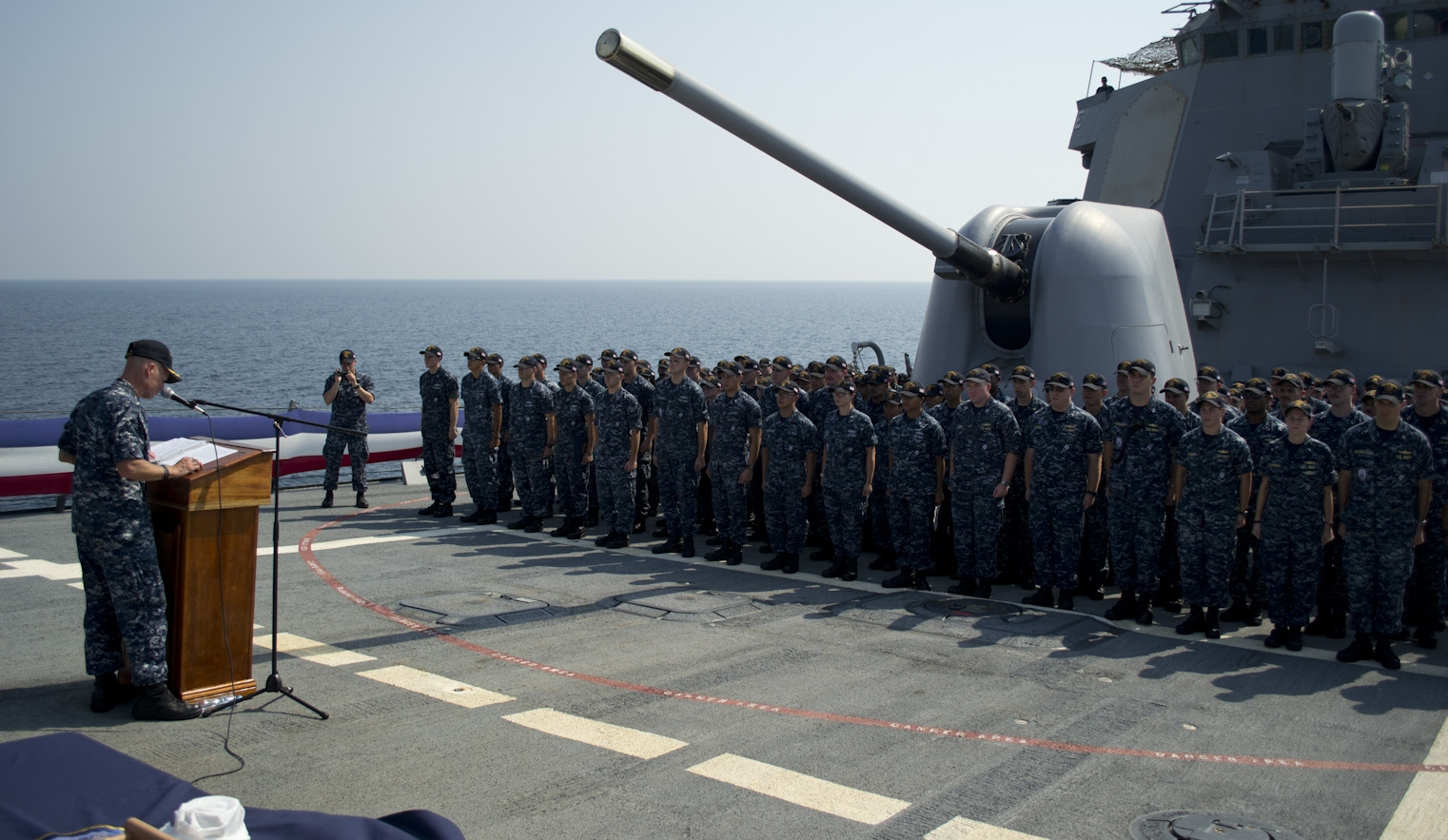
Change of command ceremony in front of Benfold's main gun, 2012

In 2012, Benfold was the first San Diego–based naval ship invited to participate in the Koa Kai naval exercises. Benfold conducted integrated flight operations, anti-surface and anti-submarine training, dynamic ship maneuvers, ballistic missile defense, small boat attacks and Maritime Interdiction Operations (MIO) utilizing the Visit, Board, Search and Seizure (VBSS) team.

=== Collision ===
On 19 November 2017 Benfold was involved in a minor collision with a Japanese commercial tug off Sagami Bay. The tug lost power and drifted into Benfold, causing damage described as minimal, with some scraping to the ship's side. There were no injuries reported on either vessel; Benfold continued at sea, while the tug was towed to Yokosuka.

=== Freedom of Navigation operations ===
Benfold has conducted the following Freedom of Navigation Operations (FONOPS) in the South China Sea:

- 12 July 2021 – Paracel Islands
- 8 September 2021 – Spratly Islands
- 18 January 2022 – Spratly Islands
- 20 January 2022 – Paracel Islands
- 13 July 2022 – Paracel Islands
- 16 July 2022 – Spratly Islands

In 2022, Benfold was praised by Seventh Fleet leadership as an exemplar of good ship preservation. On 6 August 2023, Benfold and three other destroyers responded to a joint Chinese-Russian patrol in international waters near Alaska. The Chinese–Russian flotilla left without incident.

On 9 August 2023, the Navy announced plans to extend the ship's service life beyond the initial 35 years, intending to keep Benfold in service until at least 2036. The Navy has announced plans to rotate Benfold to Everett, Washington, replacing her in Japan with USS Preble.

=== Engineering casualty in the South China Sea ===
On 24 July 2026, while sailing in the South China Sea with the George Washington Carrier Strike group, Benfold reported an engineering casualty involving its generators, causing a loss of power for four days. This meant the ship was without galley services, air conditioning, toilets and fresh water. Benfold was towed to Subic Bay in the Philippines for emergency repair. On 8 August the ship left the Philippines under its own power and sailed to Japan.

== Awards ==
- 2003–2004 – USS Arizona Memorial Trophy Award, for "superior performance in combat readiness and battle efficiency."
- 1998 – Spokane Trophy
- Navy Unit Commendation for 01-Oct-1997 to 30-Apr-1998
- Meritorious Unit Commendation as a part of the Constellation Battle Group for 01-Jan-1999 to 10-Sep-2001
- Armed Forces Expeditionary Medal, for four separate time periods between October 1997 and August 2001
- Humanitarian Service Medal for Operation Unified Assistance from 28-Dec-2004 to 12-Feb-2005
- CNO Afloat Safety Award (PACFLT) – (2007), (2024)
- Marjorie Sterrett Battleship Fund Award – (2022)

Benfold has been awarded the Navy Battle "E" for the following years: 1997, 1999, 2001, 2003 (listed as "BENFOLD DDG 76" on awards site, year of Benfold DDG-65 / Higgins DDG-76 "Sea Swap"), 2004, 2005, 2007, 2009, 2018, 2021, and 2022.
