= Sam Kasten =

American comic actor in Yiddish Theater

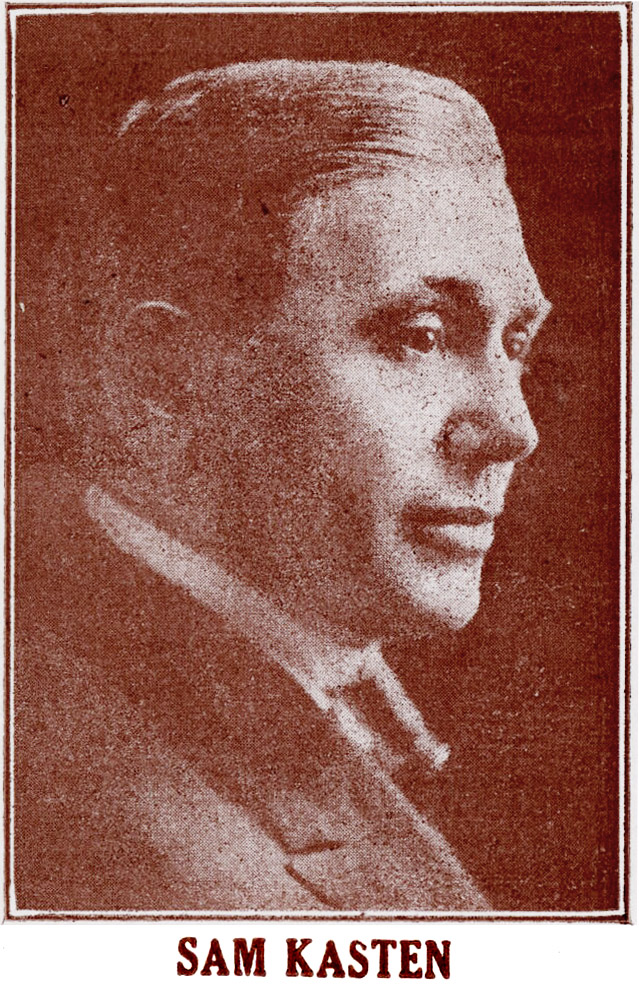

Sam Kasten (1865 or 21 April 1869 – 4 March 1953) was a comic actor and singer in Yiddish Theater. A 1925 New York Times article singled out his and Moony Weisenfreund's performances at the People's Theater as among the highlights of that year's Yiddish theater season, describing them as second only to Ludwig Satz.

== Life ==
Sam was born in the village of Zatysha, Kiev Governate, Ukraine. In 1881 he and his family emigrated to Philadelphia joining his sister and husband who had emigrated earlier.

In 1916 Joseph Rumshinsky and Boris Thomashevsky worked together on a Yiddish Play with full orchestration and 24 players called Dos Tsubrochene Fidele, The Broken Violin, a comic operetta in four acts. Kasten had several scenes including a dance scene with Dora Weissman.

He died in New York on 4 March 1953.
