= I Am a Fugitive from a Georgia Chain Gang! =

1932 book by Robert Elliott Burns

- Author: Robert Elliott Burns
- Publisher: Grosset & Dunlap
- Publication date: 1932
- ISBN: 978-0-8203-1943-8

I Am a Fugitive from a Georgia Chain Gang! (1932) is a book written by Robert Elliott Burns and published by Grosset & Dunlap.

The book recounts Burns' imprisonment on a chain gang in Georgia in the 1920s, his subsequent escape to New Jersey, and the furor that developed. The story was first published in January 1931, serialized in True Detective Mysteries magazine. Later that year, Burns's story was adapted as the motion picture I Am a Fugitive from a Chain Gang, starring Paul Muni. The book and movie were both credited with contributing to Governor Ellis Arnall's effort in 1943 to reform deplorable conditions on Georgia chain gangs.

== Plot ==
Burns was a World War I veteran who returned with post-traumatic stress disorder. He was unwittingly linked to a petty crime and ended up in Georgia's system of prison labor. He convinced another inmate to damage his shackles so that he could escape. He ended up in Chicago where he married and had a successful business. He was recaptured, escaped again, and sold his story to filmmakers. He returned to Georgia where he was successful in getting his sentence commuted to time served. His story brought national attention to the system of leasing convict labor in Georgia.

A sequel, Out of These Chains (1942), was written by Burns' brother, Vincent Godfrey Burns, an Episcopal priest.

The songwriter Jimmie Skinner, reading from his unfinished autobiography, recounts on Volume 6 of the compilation '"Doin' My Time" 1947-1963' that he wrote the country music classic "Doin' My Time" after reading the account of Robert Burns' imprisonment and escape in True Detective Mysteries magazine.

== Bibliography ==
- Robert Elliott Burns, I Am a Fugitive from a Georgia Chain Gang!, Vanguard Press, 1932; Gale Research, 1972; Beehive Press, 1994; University of Georgia Press, 1997, ISBN 978-0-8203-1943-8
