= Edward Clyde Benfold =

American Navy hospital corpsman

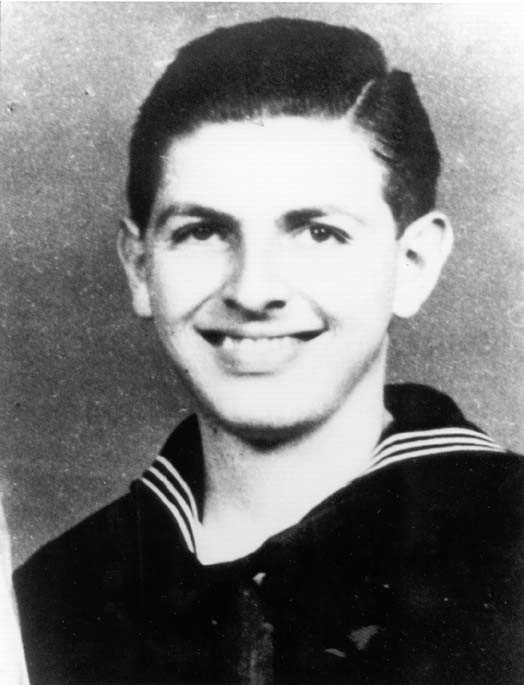
- Born: January 15, 1931; Staten Island, New York, U.S.
- Died: September 5, 1952 (aged 21) near Panmunjom, Korea
- Burial place: Beverly National Cemetery, Beverly, New Jersey
- Military career
- Allegiance: United States
- Branch: United States Navy
- Service years: 1949–1952
- Rank: Hospital Corpsman Third Class
- Units: Company E, 2nd Battalion, 1st Marines, 1st Marine Division
- Conflicts: Korean War: Battle of Bunker Hill (DOW)
- Awards: Medal of Honor; Purple Heart

Edward Clyde Benfold (January 15, 1931 – September 5, 1952) was a United States Navy hospital corpsman third class who was posthumously awarded the Medal of Honor while attached to a Marine Corps rifle company during the Battle of Bunker Hill in the Korean War.

== Early life and education ==
Benfold was born in Staten Island, the son of Edward and Glenys Benfold. His father served as a Merchant Marine Officer (1st engineer) during World War II and was killed in action serving on the Honduran ship Castilla on June 7, 1942, when the ship was torpedoed and sunk by the German submarine U-107 near Cuba.

Benfold grew up in Haddon Heights, New Jersey, and lived in nearby Audubon, where he graduated from Audubon High School in 1949.

== U.S. Navy ==
Benfold enlisted in the United States Navy on June 27, 1949, in Philadelphia, Pennsylvania. He completed Navy recruit training in Great Lakes, Illinois, in December and was selected for "A" school training there at the Naval Hospital Corps School. He was promoted to hospital apprentice in 1949. In April 1950, he was transferred to the Naval Hospital at Newport, Rhode Island.

=== Korean War ===
He was promoted to hospital corpsman third class on August 12, 1950. On June 9, 1951, he was married to Dorothy Groff. In July 1951, he was transferred to the Fleet Marine Force (FMF), Field Medical Service School at Camp Lejeune, North Carolina, for combat field training, graduating in September as a Field Medical Service Technician (HM-8404). He was then assigned to the 3rd Battalion, 3rd Marines, 3rd Marine Division (was the 3rd Marine Brigade until January 1952), Fleet Marine Force, as a FMF corpsman, at Camp Pendleton, California. In March 1952, he was transferred to the 1st Battalion, 3rd Marines, 3rd Marine Division, Fleet Marine Force, at Camp Pendleton until July 1952. On July 21, he was assigned to the 1st Marine Division in Korea, where he was assigned to E Company, 2nd Battalion, 1st Marine Regiment.

==== Death and burial ====
Benfold was killed in action on September 5, 1952, while saving the lives of two wounded Marines he was aiding in a crater from two enemy hand grenades at "Outpost Bruce" which was held by Marines of I Company, 3rd Battalion, 5th Marines in North Korea during the Battle of Bunker Hill (September 5–15, 1952) in western Korea.

Benfold was awarded the Medal of Honor posthumously. On July 16, 1953, The medal was presented by Rear Admiral John H. Brown Jr., Commandant of the 4th Naval District, to his one-year-old son, Edward Joseph, who was his next of kin (NOK) as his wife remarried.

Benfold was buried with full military honors in Beverly National Cemetery, New Jersey. His grave can be found in the Distinguished Service Section, Grave 12.

== Medal of Honor citation ==
Benfold's Medal of Honor citation reads:

The President of the United States in the name of The Congress takes pride in presenting the MEDAL OF HONOR posthumously to

HOSPITAL CORPSMAN THIRD CLASS EDWARD C. BENFOLD
UNITED STATES NAVY

for service as set forth in the following

CITATION:

For gallantry and intrepidity at the risk of his life above and beyond the call of duty while serving as a Hospital Corpsman, attached to a company in the First Marine Division during operations against enemy aggressor forces in Korea on September 5, 1952. When his company was subjected to heavy artillery and mortar barrages, followed by a determined assault during the hours of darkness by an enemy force estimated at battalion strength, HC3c. BENFOLD resolutely moved from position to position in the face of intense hostile fire, treating the wounded and lending words of encouragement. Leaving the protection of his sheltered position to treat the wounded when the platoon area in which he was working was attacked from both the front and the rear, he moved forward to an exposed ridge line where he observed two Marines in a large crater. As he approached the two men to determine their condition, an enemy soldier threw two grenades into the crater while two other enemy charged the position. Picking up a grenade in each hand, HC3c. BENFOLD leaped out of the crater and hurled himself against the onrushing hostile soldiers, pushing the grenades against their chests and killing both the attackers. Mortally wounded while carrying out this heroic act, HC3c. BENFOLD, by his great personal valor and resolute spirit of self-sacrifice in the face of almost certain death, was directly responsible for saving the lives of his two comrades. His exceptional courage reflects the highest credit upon himself and enhances the finest traditions of the United States Naval Service. He gallantly gave his life for others.

Harry S. Truman

== Awards and Decorations ==

1st row	Medal of Honor		
2nd row	Purple Heart	Combat Action Ribbon Retroactively Awarded, 1999	Navy Unit Commendation
3rd row	Navy Good Conduct Medal	National Defense Service Medal	Korean Service Medal with the Fleet Marine Force Insignia and 1 Campaign star
4th row	Republic of Korea Presidential Unit Citation	United Nations Service Medal Korea	Korean War Service Medal Retroactively Awarded, 2003

== Other honors ==
=== USS Benfold ===
The Arleigh Burke-class guided missile destroyer USS Benfold (DDG-65) was named after Hospital Corpsman Third Class Edward C. Benfold and commissioned on March 30, 1996, at Broadway Pier in San Diego.

=== Benfold Medical Center ===
The Benfold Center, Naval Branch Health Clinic (Building S-771), in Millington, Tennessee was named in his honor.

=== Medal of Honor Memorial ===
Listed on Audubon High School's Medal of Honor Memorial (1994).

== See also ==
- List of Korean War Medal of Honor recipients
