= I Am a Fugitive from a Chain Gang =

1932 film

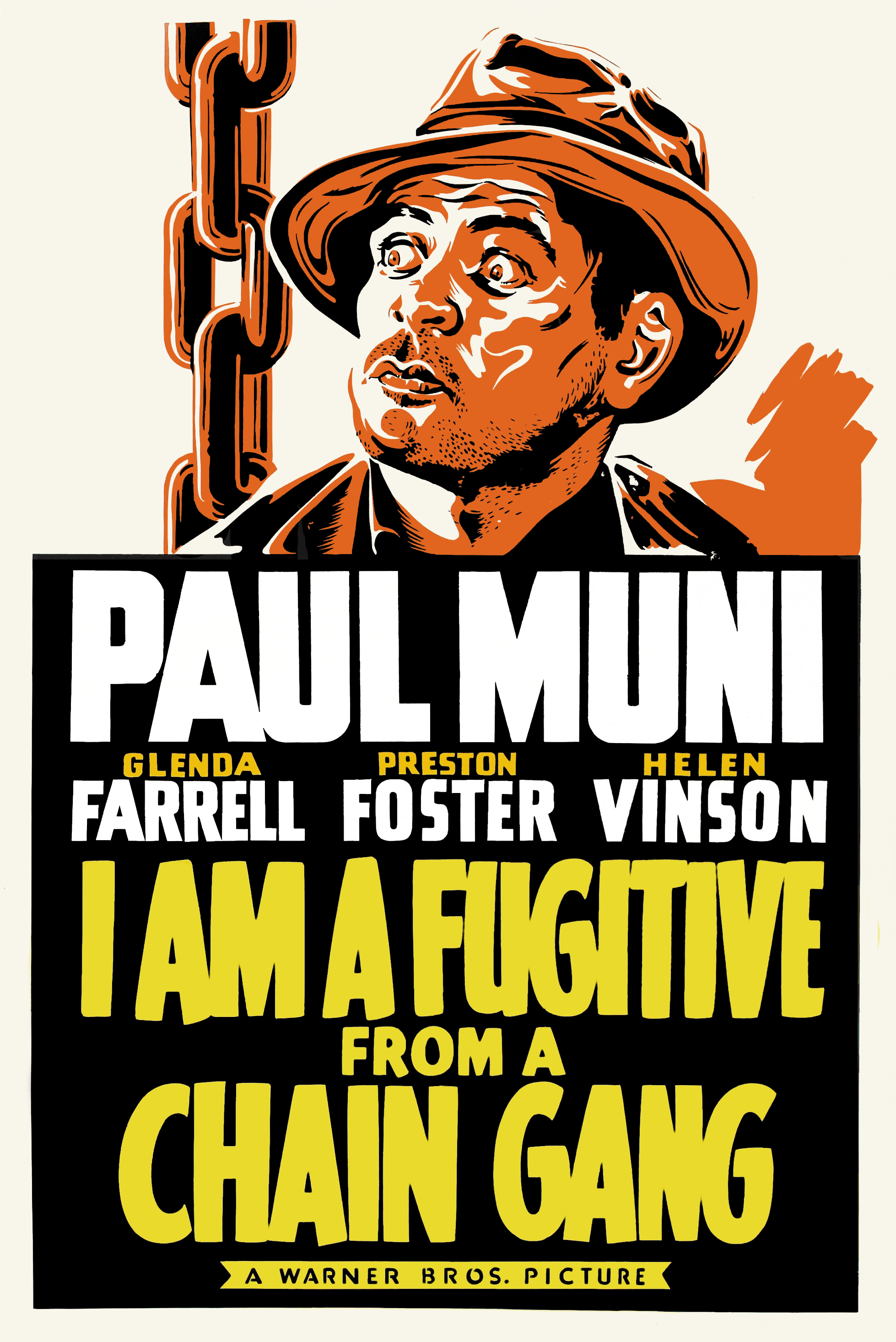
- Theatrical release poster
- Directed by: Mervyn LeRoy
- Screenplay by: Howard J. Green; Brown Holmes
- Based on: I Am a Fugitive from a Georgia Chain Gang! 1932 book by Robert E. Burns
- Produced by: Hal B. Wallis
- Starring: Paul Muni; Glenda Farrell; Helen Vinson; Noel Francis
- Cinematography: Sol Polito
- Edited by: William Holmes
- Music by: Bernhard Kaun
- Production company: The Vitaphone Corporation
- Distributed by: Warner Bros. Pictures
- Release date: November 10, 1932
- Running time: 93 minutes
- Country: United States
- Language: English
- Budget: $228,000
- Box office: $1,599,000

I Am a Fugitive from a Chain Gang is a 1932 American pre-Code crime tragedy film directed by Mervyn LeRoy and starring Paul Muni as a convicted man on a chain gang who escapes to Chicago. It was released on November 10, 1932. The film received critical acclaim and was nominated for three Academy Awards including Best Picture and Best Actor for Muni.

The film was written by Howard J. Green and Brown Holmes from Robert Elliott Burns's 1932 autobiography of a similar name, I Am a Fugitive from a Georgia Chain Gang!, originally serialized in the True Detective magazine. In 1991, the film was selected for preservation in the United States National Film Registry by the Library of Congress as being "culturally, historically, or aesthetically significant".

== Plot ==
American sergeant James Allen returns to civilian life after World War I. He has served with distinction, earning a medal for his bravery, but his war experience has made him restless. His mother and minister brother feel Allen should be grateful for a tedious office clerk job his former employer has offered him. When he announces that he wants to work in construction and improve society as an engineer, his brother is outraged, but his mother regretfully accepts his ambitions.

He leaves home to find work, but there is a surfeit of unskilled laborers and it is hard for him to find a job. Allen sinks slowly into poverty. In an unnamed Southern state, he is forced at gunpoint to participate in a robbery. The police arrive and shoot and kill the robber. Allen panics and attempts to flee but is caught immediately.

Allen is tried and sentenced to hard labor. He is quickly exposed to the brutal conditions of life on a chain gang. The work is agonizing, and the guards are cruel and sadistically whip prisoners. Allen is befriended by Bomber Wells, a chain-gang veteran. The two talk about breaking out.

In preparing for an escape, Allen receives assistance from Sebastian, a powerfully built prisoner who damages Allen's shackles so that he can slip his feet out of them. Bomber gives him some money for the escape. At work, after asking a guard for permission to relieve himself, Allen slips out of his chains and runs. Armed guards and bloodhounds give chase, but Allen evades them. He makes it to a nearby town, where he is given a room for the night by Barney Sykes, a former prisoner who is one of Bomber's friends. He takes a train out of town the next day.

Allen makes his way to Chicago, where he obtains a job as a manual laborer and uses his knowledge of engineering and construction to rise to a prominent position in a construction company. He becomes romantically involved with his landlady, Marie Woods, who eventually discovers his secret and blackmails him into an unhappy marriage.

At the invitation of his superior, Allen attends a party where he meets and falls in love with a woman named Helen. He eventually tells Marie that he wants a divorce, but she then betrays him to the authorities. After being arrested, Allen describes the inhumane conditions of the chain gangs to the press, becoming national news. The Chicago papers express their disgust with the chain-gang system and their sympathy for a reformed man such as Allen, while editorials written by Southerners describe his continued freedom as a violation of "states' rights."

The Governor of Illinois refuses to extradite Allen to the Southern state. Its officials then offer Allen a deal: return voluntarily and receive a pardon after 90 days of easy clerical work. Allen accepts, only to find the proposals were a ruse; he is sent to another chain gang, where, reunited with Bomber, he languishes for a year and is denied a pardon.

Allen then decides to escape once more, this time with Bomber. At a work site, the two steal a dump truck and successfully get away by using dynamite Bomber finds in the truck. Bomber dies in the attempt, but Allen makes a narrow escape. He disappears despite a relentless manhunt.

Over a year later, Allen visits Chicago to say goodbye to Helen. They embrace, but he tells her that he is on the run and cannot say where he is going. When she asks what he does for money, he simply replies, "I steal."

== Cast ==
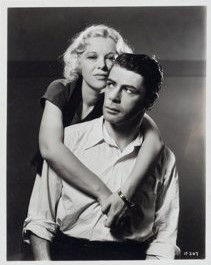
Paul Muni and Glenda Farrell in I Am a Fugitive from a Chain Gang (1932)

Billed in the opening credits:

- Paul Muni as James Allen
- Glenda Farrell as Marie
- Helen Vinson as Helen
- Noel Francis as Linda
- Preston Foster as Pete
- Allen Jenkins as Barney Sykes
- Berton Churchill as the Judge
- Edward Ellis as Bomber Wells
- David Landau as the Warden
- Hale Hamilton as Rev. Allen
- Sally Blane as Alice
- Louise Carter as Mrs. Allen (the mother of James Allen)
- Willard Robertson as the Prison Board Chairman
- Robert McWade as F.E. Ramsey, the attorney
- Robert Warwick as Fuller
- William LeMaire as a Texan (credited as William Le Maire)

Unbilled:

- Jack LaRue as Ackerman
- Walter Long as Blacksmith
- Charles Middleton as Train Conductor
- Everett Brown as Sebastian

== Development and production ==
The film was based on the book I Am a Fugitive from a Georgia Chain Gang! (1932) written by Robert Elliott Burns and published by Vanguard Press. The book recounts Burns' service on a chain gang while imprisoned in Georgia in the 1920s, his subsequent escape and the furor that developed. The story was first serialized in True Detective mysteries magazine in 1931.

Despite Jack L. Warner's and Darryl F. Zanuck's interest in adapting Burns's book, the Warner Bros. story department voted against it with a report that concluded: "[T]his book might make a picture if we had no censorship, but all the strong and vivid points in the story are certain to be eliminated by the present censorship board." The story editor's reasons were mostly related to the story's violence and the uproar that was sure to explode in the Deep South. In the end, Warner and Zanuck had the final say and approved the project.

Roy Del Ruth, the highest-paid director at Warner Bros., was assigned to direct, but he refused the assignment. In a lengthy memo to supervising producer Hal B. Wallis, Del Ruth explained his decision: "This subject is heavy and morbid...there is not one moment of relief anywhere." Del Ruth further argued that the story "lacks box-office appeal," and that offering a depressing story to the public seemed ill-timed, given the harsh reality of the Great Depression outside the walls of the local neighborhood cinema. Mervyn LeRoy, who was at that time directing 42nd Street (released in 1933), dropped out of the shooting and left the reins to Lloyd Bacon.

LeRoy cast Paul Muni in the role of James Allen after seeing him in a stage production of Counsellor at Law. Muni was not impressed with LeRoy upon first meeting him in the Warner Burbank office, but Muni and LeRoy became close friends. LeRoy was present at Muni's funeral in 1967 along with Muni's agent.

To prepare for the role, Muni conducted several intensive meetings with Robert E. Burns in Burbank to learn how Burns walked and talked, in essence, to catch "the smell of fear". Muni stated to Burns: "I don't want to imitate you; I want to be you." Muni set the Warner Bros. research department on a quest to procure every available book and magazine article about the penal system. He also met with several California prison guards, including one who had worked on a Southern chain gang. Muni fancied the idea of meeting with a guard or warden still working in Georgia, but Warner studio executives quickly rejected his suggestion.

The final lines in the film, "But you must, Jim. How do you live?", followed by "I steal," are among the most famous closing lines in American film. Director Mervyn LeRoy later claimed that the idea for James' retreat into darkness came to him when a fuse blew on the set, but it had been written into the script.

== Box office ==
According to Warner Bros. figures, the film earned $650,000 domestically and $949,000 internationally, making it the studio's third-highest success of 1932–33 after Gold Diggers of 1933 and 42nd Street.

== Critical reception ==
On the review aggregator website Rotten Tomatoes, the film has an approval rating of 96%, based on reviews from 27 critics.

Variety reviewer Abel Green wrote in November 1932 that it "is a picture with guts. It grips with its stark realism and packs lots of punch." And that "The finale is stark in its realism." The review said, "Muni turns in a pip performance." Variety also included a "Miniature" and "The Woman's Angle" reviews.

Frederick James Smith in Liberty in November 1932 gave the film the top score of 4 stars, "extraordinary". "Paul Muni is splendid as the chain-gang victim. All the other roles are well done, but they are incidental to Muni and Mervyn Le Roy's tense, vigorous direction."

The New Republic wrote in December 1932 that it "is one of the finest to come from Hollywood in many a day. It tells with unflinching realism how chain-gang prisoners are treated and at the same time through its direction and acting it is raised far above the level of mere journalistic exposure. It will bring home the conditions among prisoners to millions of persons".

Jeremiah Kipp of Slant Magazine wrote in 2005, "Th[e] soul-crushing horrors of slave labor in the penal system are neatly interwoven into a highly gripping plot." But Kipp thought, "It feels more like an uncompromising prison film than a message movie, so its frequent heavy-handedness seems more like unabashed pulp rather than sanctimony."

Kim Newman wrote in 2006 for Empire, "The most powerful of Warner Brothers' early 1930s 'social problem' films, this indictment of organised cruelty remains potent, hard-hitting melodrama." And he said it was a "Suprisingly [sic] no-holds-barred portrait of institutional bullying for such an early film."

== Legacy ==
The film is amongst the first examples of cinema used to garner sympathy for imprisoned convicts without divulging the actual crimes of the convicts. American audiences began to question the legitimacy of the U.S. legal system, and in January 1933, the film's protagonist, Robert Elliott Burns (who was still imprisoned in New Jersey), and several other chain-gang prisoners in the U.S. appealed and were released. In January 1933, Georgia chain-gang warden J. Harold Hardy, who was also made into a character in the film, sued the studio for one million dollars for displaying "vicious, brutal and false attacks" against him in the film.

In 1991, the film was selected for preservation in the U.S. National Film Registry by the Library of Congress as being "culturally, historically, or aesthetically significant".

The true-life story was later the basis for the television movie The Man Who Broke 1,000 Chains (1987) starring Val Kilmer.

== Awards and nominations ==
Academy Award Nominations:

- Best Picture
- Best Actor in a Leading Role – Paul Muni
- Best Sound Recording – Nathan Levinson

National Board of Review Award:

- 1932 – Best Picture

Other Wins:

- 1991 – National Film Registry
