= Angel on My Shoulder =

1946 film directed by Archie Mayo

- Original theatrical poster
- Directed by: Archie Mayo
- Screenplay by: Harry Segall; Roland Kibbee
- Story by: Harry Segall
- Produced by: Charles R. Rogers
- Starring: Paul Muni; Anne Baxter; Claude Rains
- Cinematography: James Van Trees
- Edited by: Asa Boyd Clark
- Music by: Dimitri Tiomkin
- Production company: Premier Productions
- Distributed by: United Artists
- Release date: September 20, 1946
- Running time: 100 minutes
- Country: United States
- Language: English

Angel on My Shoulder is a 1946 American supernatural film starring Paul Muni, Anne Baxter and Claude Rains. The plot involves a deal between the Devil and a dead man. It was directed by Archie Mayo (as his last film).

The film was an independent production produced by Charles R. Rogers and David W. Siegel, written by Harry Segall and Roland Kibbee and released by United Artists.

The producer changed the original title of Me and Satan, concerned that the public would not see a film about the devil.

== Plot ==
Angel on My Shoulder (1946)

After his release from prison, gangster Eddie Kagle is killed by his partner in crime, Smiley Williams. Kagle ends up in Hell, where "Nick" offers him a chance to leave and avenge his own death in exchange for help with a problem. Kagle looks exactly like Judge Frederick Parker, an upright man who is causing Nick distress because he is honest. Nick fears that Parker may cause him more anxiety in future, as he is running for governor of his state. Nick wants to destroy Parker's reputation, and Kagle readily agrees to have his soul transferred into Parker's body in exchange for the opportunity to exact revenge on Williams.

As soon as Kagle appears as Parker, odd things begin to happen. Kagle pursues his goal with evil intent (though often at cross purposes with the Devil), but everything he does to ruin Judge Parker's reputation somehow results in making Parker look better. Along the way, Kagle falls in love with Barbara Foster, the judge's fiancée, causing him to question his whole outlook on life and to eventually rebel against Nick.

Nick presents Kagle with the opportunity to shoot Williams, but instead Kagle confronts Williams with the truth. Shocked and frightened, Williams backs away and falls out of an open window to his death. Beyond Nick's power by virtue of having committed no wrongdoing since his return to life, Kagle is eager to stay, start a life with Barbara and take up Judge Parker's mission to support troubled young people. However, Nick tells him that every moment Kagle is present he is denying Parker and Barbara their rightful life together. Kagle agrees, bids Barbara farewell and relinquishes Parker's body, allowing the couple a tearful reunion.

Exasperated and defeated, Nick takes Kagle back to Hell, leaving Judge Parker in a much better position than before. Nick threatens to make the reformed Kagle's punishment even more painful than usual, but Kagle blackmails him; in return for not revealing Nick's blunders, Kagle wants to be made a trusty. Nick agrees to the demand.

== Cast ==
- Paul Muni as Eddie Kagle/Judge Fredrick Parker
- Anne Baxter as Barbara Foster
- Claude Rains as Nick
- Onslow Stevens as Dr. Matt Higgins
- George Cleveland as Albert
- Erskine Sanford as Minister
- Marion Martin as Mrs. Bentley
- Hardie Albright as Smiley Williams
- James Flavin as Bellamy
- Fritz Leiber as Chemist (uncredited)

== Copyright status and remakes ==
The film’s U.S. copyright expired in 1973, leaving it in the public domain there.

The film was remade for television, directed by John Berry and starring Peter Strauss, Richard Kiley and Barbara Hershey. It premiered on ABC on May 11, 1980. The 1980 version has a different ending, where as Nick is about to take Kagle back to hell, God (played by Murray Matheson) appears and takes Kagle to Heaven, reasoning that Kagle has changed for the better since his reappearance on Earth and is worthy of redemption.
