= Bob Dutko =

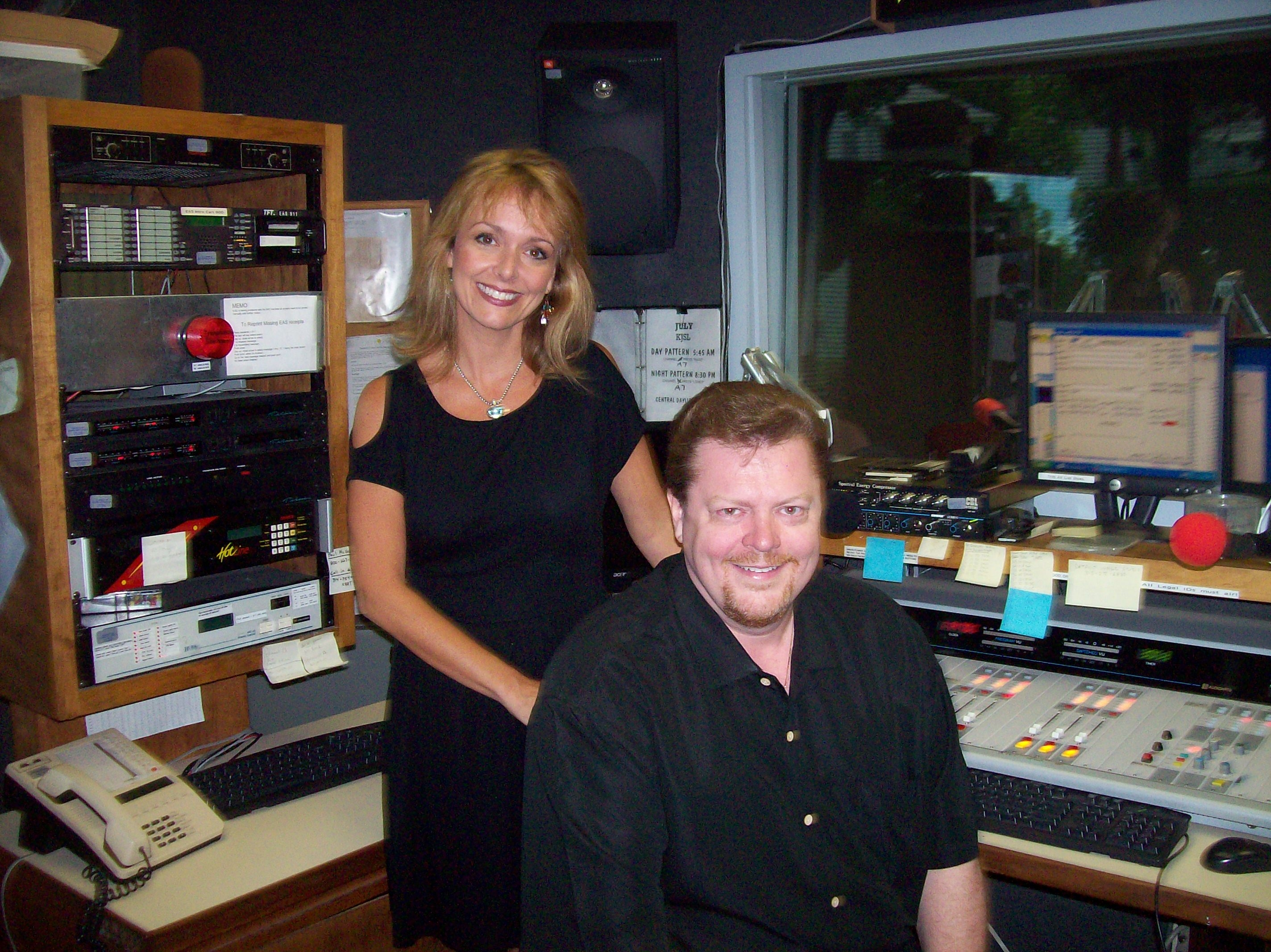
Dr. Gina Loudon and Bob Dutko

Bob Dutko (born November 12, 1960) is a conservative Christian talk radio host in Detroit, Michigan on the Crawford Broadcasting Network. The Bob Dutko Show airs weekdays from noon to 4:00 pm Eastern Time on WMUZ-FM and several Crawford Broadcasting stations nationwide. Additionally, he can be heard weekdays 9pm to 10pm on the Bob Dutko Primetime program. Dutko also hosts the Defending the Truth with Bob Dutko airing on various stations nationwide. The national program began in February 2008, greatly expanding his audience outside of the Detroit metro area. Bob joined WMUZ-FM in the fall of 2000. Before coming to WMUZ-FM, he served as National Press Secretary for Christian Coalition of America in Washington D.C. under Roberta Combs and Pat Robertson.

== Personal ==
Dutko was raised in the Worldwide Church of God (Armstrongism) before becoming a born-again Christian at age 19. Bob is married and has had 6 boys and 1 daughter. Colleen, the Dutko's only daughter, suffered a cardiac arrest while at work. She was transported to a nearby hospital, where she died. Colleen was 17 years old at the time of death.
