= Paul Muni =

American stage and film actor (1895–1967)

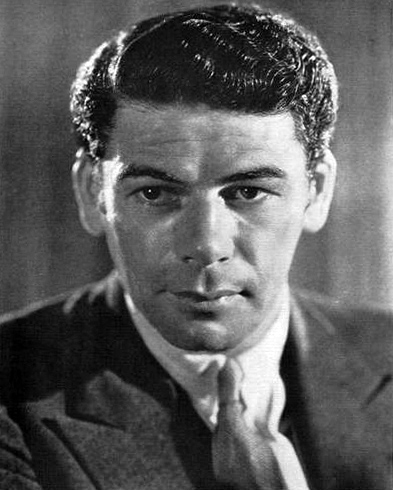
- Muni in 1936
- Born: Frederich Meshilem Meier Weisenfreund; September 22, 1895; Lemberg, Austro-Hungarian Empire (now Lviv, Ukraine)
- Died: August 25, 1967 (aged 71); Montecito, California, U.S.
- Resting place: Hollywood Forever Cemetery
- Other name: Muni Weisenfreund
- Occupation: Actor
- Years active: 1908–1962
- Spouse: Bella Finkel (m. 1921)

Paul Muni (born Frederich Meshilem Meier Weisenfreund; September 22, 1895 – August 25, 1967) was an American stage and film actor from Chicago. He started his acting career in the Yiddish theater and during the 1930s, he was considered one of the most prestigious actors at the Warner Bros. studio and was given the rare privilege of choosing his own parts.

Muni often played powerful characters, such as the lead role in Scarface (1932), and was known for his intense preparation for his parts, often immersing himself in the study of the real characters' traits and mannerisms. He was also highly skilled in makeup techniques, a talent that he had learned from his parents, who were also actors, and from his early years on stage with the Yiddish theater in Chicago. At the age of 12, he played the stage role of an 80-year-old man, and in the film Seven Faces, he played seven characters.

Muni appeared in 22 films and was nominated for the Academy Award for Best Actor five times, winning the award for his role in the 1936 film The Story of Louis Pasteur. He also won the Volpi Cup for Best Actor for the same film. He also starred in numerous Broadway plays and won the Tony Award for Best Actor in a Play for his role in the 1955 production of Inherit the Wind.

== Early life and career ==
Muni was born in 1895 as Frederich Meier Weisenfreund to a Jewish family in Lemberg, Galicia, then Austro-Hungarian Empire (now Lviv, Ukraine). His Hebrew name was Meshilem. His parents were Salli (born Khaya Tsilke Fishler) and Phillip Weisenfreund. He learned Yiddish as his first language. When he was seven, he emigrated with his family to the United States in 1902; they settled in Chicago.

Muni's makeup skills were used for The Story of Louis Pasteur.

As a boy, he was known as "Moony". He started his acting career in the Yiddish theatre in Chicago with his parents, who were both actors. As a teenager, he developed skill in creating makeup, which enabled him to play much older characters. Film historian Robert Osborne notes that Muni's makeup skills were so creative that for most of his roles, "he transformed his appearance so completely, he was dubbed 'the new Lon Chaney.'" In his first stage role at the age of 12, Muni played the role of an 80-year-old man. He was quickly recognized by Maurice Schwartz, who signed him to perform in his Yiddish Art Theater.

A 1925 New York Times article mentioned Sam Kasten's and Muni's performances at the People's Theater among the highlights of the year's Yiddish theater season, describing them as second only to Ludwig Satz.

Muni began acting on Broadway in 1926. His first role was that of an elderly Jewish man in the play We Americans, written by playwrights Max Siegel and Milton Herbert Gropper. It was the first time that he had acted in English.

In 1921, he married Bella Finkel (February 8, 1898 – October 1, 1971), an actress in the Yiddish theatre and daughter of Moishe Finkel. They remained married until Muni's death in 1967.

== Hollywood ==
In 1929, Muni was signed by Fox. His name was simplified and anglicized to Paul Muni (derived from his nickname of youth "Moony"). His acting talents were quickly recognized, and he received an Oscar nomination for his first film, The Valiant (1929), although the film fared poorly at the box office. His second film, Seven Faces (also 1929), was also a financial failure. Unhappy with the roles offered to him, he returned to Broadway, where he starred in a major hit play, Counsellor at Law.

Muni soon returned to Hollywood to star in provocative pre-Code films such as Scarface and I Am a Fugitive from a Chain Gang (both 1932). For his role in I Am a Fugitive from a Chain Gang, Muni was nominated for an Oscar for Best Actor. His acclaim as a result of his performance impressed Warner Bros., which signed him to a long-term contract, publicizing him as "the screen's greatest actor."

I had been wanting to see Scarface since 1974 ... The film just stopped me in my tracks. All I wanted to do was imitate Paul Muni. His acting went beyond the boundaries of naturalism into another kind of expression. It was almost abstract what he did. It was almost uplifting.

— Al Pacino

Scarface, part of a cycle of gangster films at the time, was written by Ben Hecht and directed by Howard Hawks. Critic Richard Corliss noted in 1974 that while it was a serious gangster film, it also "manages both to congratulate journalism for its importance and to chastise it for its chicanery, by underlining the newspapers' complicity in promoting the underworld image."

In 1935, Muni starred in Black Fury. At the 8th Academy Awards, Muni was not officially nominated for the Academy Award for Best Actor, but he came in second on the basis of write-in votes, which were allowed that year.

Muni persuaded Warner Bros. to take a financial risk by producing the successful historical biography The Story of Louis Pasteur, which was released in 1936. This became Muni's first of many biographical roles. Until that film, most Warner Bros. stories had originated from current events and major news stories, with the notable exceptions of George Arliss's earlier biographical films Disraeli, Alexander Hamilton and Voltaire. Muni won an Oscar for his performance.

Muni played other historical figures, including Émile Zola in The Life of Emile Zola (1937), for which he was again nominated for an Oscar. The film won Best Picture and was interpreted as indirectly attacking the repression of Nazi Germany. He also played the lead role in Juarez (1939).

In 1937, Muni played a Chinese peasant with a new bride in a film adaptation of Pearl Buck's novel The Good Earth. The film was a re-creation of a revolutionary period in China and included special effects for a locust attack and the overthrow of the government. Because Muni was not of Asian descent, when producer Irving Thalberg offered him the role, he said, "I'm about as Chinese as [President] Herbert Hoover."

Dissatisfied with life in Hollywood, Muni chose not to renew his contract. He returned to the screen only occasionally in later years for such roles as Frédéric Chopin's teacher in A Song to Remember (1945). In 1946, he played a rare comic role in Angel on My Shoulder.

== Later career ==
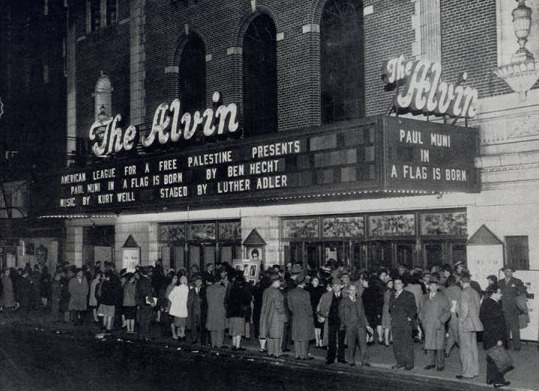
New York City opening of A Flag is Born (1946)

Muni then focused most of his energies on stage work, and occasionally on television roles. In 1946, he appeared on Broadway in A Flag is Born, written by Ben Hecht, to help promote the creation of a Jewish state in Israel. This play was directed by Luther Adler and co-starred Marlon Brando. Years later, in response to a question put to him by Alan King, Brando stated that Muni was the greatest actor he ever saw. At London's Phoenix Theatre on July 28, 1949, Muni began a run as Willy Loman in the first British production of Death of a Salesman by Arthur Miller. He took over from Lee J. Cobb, who had played the principal role in the original Broadway production. Both productions were directed by Elia Kazan.

In 1952, Muni traveled to Italy to star in Stranger on the Prowl, directed by Joseph Losey, partly as an act of solidarity and support for blacklisted friends living abroad in exile.

A few years later, during 1955 and 1956, Muni had his biggest stage success in the United States as the crusading lawyer, Henry Drummond (based on Clarence Darrow), in Inherit the Wind, winning a Tony Award for Best Performance by a Leading Actor in a Play. In late August 1955, Muni was forced to withdraw from the play due to a serious eye ailment causing deterioration in his eyesight. He was later replaced by actor Melvyn Douglas.

In early September 1955, Muni, then 59 years old, was diagnosed with a tumor of the left eye. The eye was removed in an operation at Mt. Sinai Hospital in New York. His right eye was reported to be normal. In early December 1955, Muni returned to his starring role as Henry Drummond in Inherit the Wind.

His last movie role was as an aging doctor in The Last Angry Man (1959), and he was again nominated for an Oscar. After that, Muni mostly retired from acting to deal with failing eyesight and other health problems. He made his final screen appearance on television, in a guest role on the dramatic series Saints and Sinners in 1962.

== Acting techniques, reputation and legacy ==
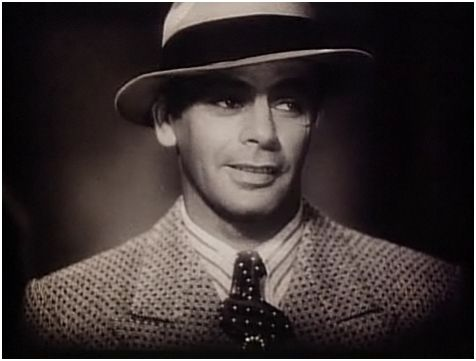
Paul Muni in the trailer for Scarface

Muni was noted for his intense preparation for his roles, especially the biographies. While preparing for The Story of Louis Pasteur, Muni said, "I read most everything that was in the library, and everything I could lay my hands on that had to do with Pasteur, with Lister, or with his contemporaries." He did the same in preparing for his role as Henry Drummond, based on Clarence Darrow, in the play Inherit the Wind. He read what he could find, talked to people who knew Darrow personally, and studied physical mannerisms from photographs of him. "To Paul Muni, acting was not just a career, but an obsession", writes The New York Times. They note that despite his enormous success both on Broadway and in films, "he threw himself into each role with a sense of dedication." Playwright Arthur Miller commented that Muni "was pursued by a fear of failure."

As Muni was born into an acting family, with both of his parents professional actors, "he learned his craft carefully and thoroughly." On stage, "a Muni whisper could reach the last balcony of any theater", writes the Times. It wrote that his style "had drawn into it the warmth of the Yiddish stage", in which he made his debut at the age of 12. In addition, his technique in using makeup "was a work of art." Combined with acting which followed no "method", he perfected his control of voice and gestures into an acting style that was "unique."

Film historian David Shipman described Muni as "an actor of great integrity", noting he meticulously prepared for his roles. Muni was widely recognized as eccentric if talented: he objected to anyone wearing red in his presence, and he could often be found between sessions playing his violin. Over the years, he became increasingly dependent on his wife, Bella, a dependence which increased as his failing eyesight turned to blindness in his final years. Muni was "inflexible on matters of taste and principle", once turning down an $800,000 movie contract because he was not happy with the studio's choice of film roles.

Although Muni was considered one of the best film actors of the 1930s, some film critics, such as David Thomson and Andrew Sarris, accuse him of overacting. Thomson described Muni as "a crucial negative illustration in any argument as to what constitutes screen acting."

German director William Dieterle, who directed him in his three biopics, also frequently accused him of overacting, despite his respect for the actor.

== Personal life ==
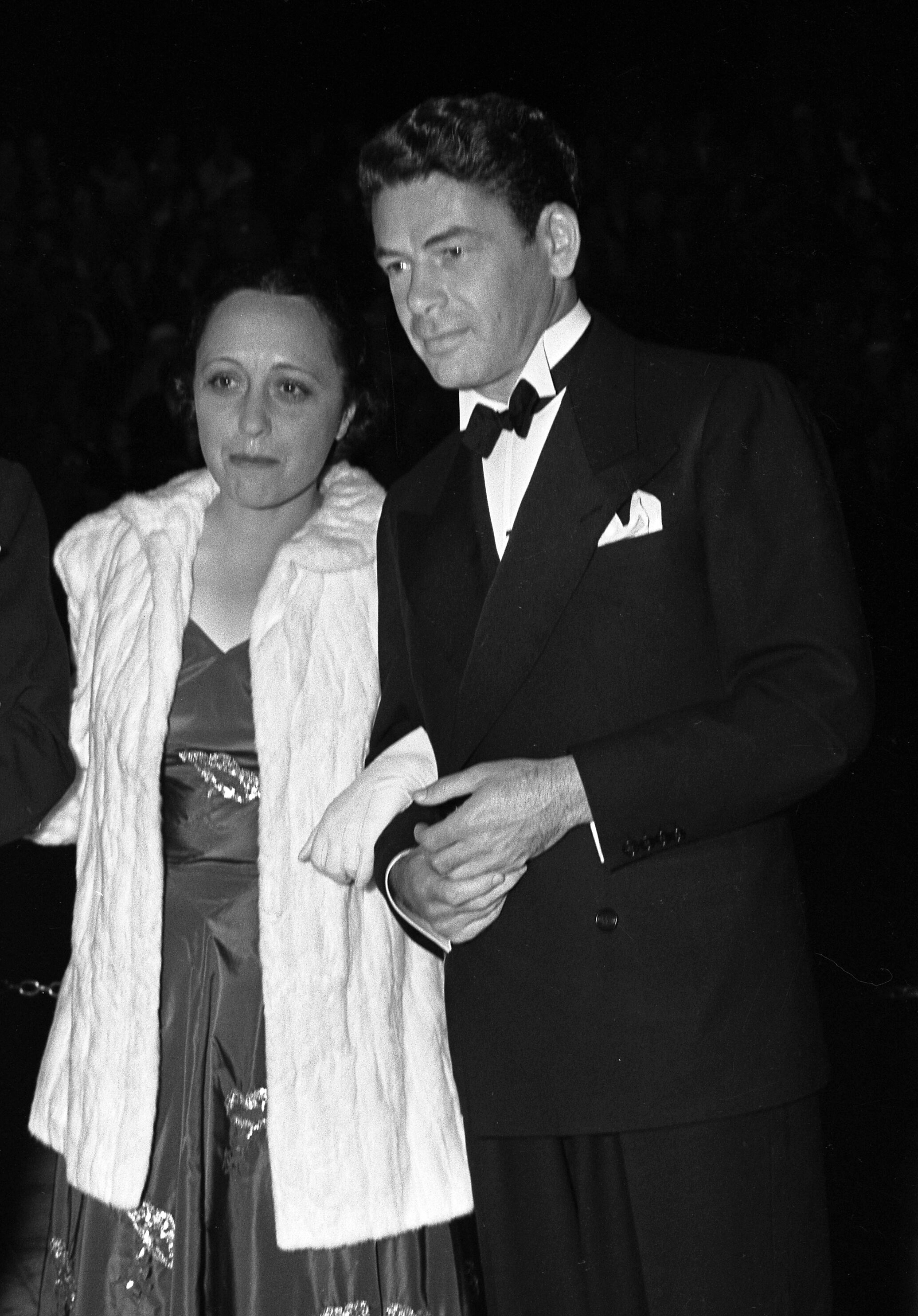
Muni with his wife Bella at the premiere of The Life of Emile Zola in 1937

Muni campaigned for the re-election of President Herbert Hoover in 1932.

After retiring from acting, he lived in California. In his den, which he called his "Shangri-La", he spent time reading books and listening to the radio.

Muni died of a heart disorder in Montecito, California in 1967 at the age of 71. He is interred at the Hollywood Forever Cemetery in Hollywood.

== Legacy and honors ==
Muni had four official Academy Award nominations for Best Actor, winning for The Story of Louis Pasteur (1936) and receiving official nominations for I Am a Fugitive from a Chain Gang (1932), The Life of Emile Zola (1937) and The Last Angry Man (1959). His nomination for the film The Valiant (1929) is unofficial because at the 2nd Academy Awards, acting nominees were not announced, only the winners' names. Muni's performance in Black Fury was not nominated for an Oscar. (Note that the Academy's website includes both "The Valiant" and "Black Fury" among Muni's nominated performances.)

- New York Film Critics Circle Award for The Life of Emile Zola
- Tony Award for Best Actor in Inherit the Wind
- A star was installed in his honor on the Hollywood Walk of Fame at 6435 Hollywood Blvd.
- A film musical titled Actor: The Paul Muni Story (1978) was based on his life, with Herschel Bernardi starring.
- A biography titled Actor: The Life and Times of Paul Muni (1974) was written by Jerome Lawrence.

== In popular culture ==
Referring to his childhood during the Great Depression, Hawkeye Pierce in the "Hawkeye" episode of the television series M*A*S*H says: "You knew where you stood in those days. Franklin Roosevelt was always president, Joe Louis was always the champ, and Paul Muni played everybody."

Muni and George Raft appeared as characters in the fifth season of Boardwalk Empire, meeting with Al Capone to discuss the film Scarface.

Comedian and actor Paul Mooney took his stage name, which was also his childhood nickname, from Muni.

== Filmography ==
Year	Title	Role	Notes
1929	The Valiant	James Dyke	Nominated — Academy Award for Best Actor
1929	Seven Faces	Papa Chibou / Diablero / Willie Smith / Franz Schubert / Don Juan / Joe Gans / Napoleon	Lost film
1932	Scarface	Antonio "Tony" Camonte	
1932	I Am a Fugitive from a Chain Gang	James Allen	Nominated — Academy Award for Best Actor
1933	The World Changes	Orin Nordholm Jr.	
1934	Hi Nellie!	Brad Bradshaw	
1935	Bordertown	Johnny Ramirez	
1935	Black Fury (Note: Muni was not nominated for an Oscar for his performance in Black Fury. For two years only, the Academy allowed a write-in vote. This meant that technically, any performance was eligible for an award. This decision was made in 1935 in response to the controversy surrounding Bette Davis failing to get a nomination for her performance in Of Human Bondage. Muni came in 2nd in the vote for Best Actor, but the Academy does not recognize Muni or Davis as nominees in those years. The Academy's nomination and winner database does note this under the 1935 Best Actor category and under the Paul Muni search, as well as for Davis in 1934 and Best Actress.)	Joe Radek	
1935	Dr. Socrates	Dr. Lee Cardwell, nicknamed "Dr. Socrates"	
1936	The Story of Louis Pasteur	Louis Pasteur	Academy Award for Best Actor; Volpi Cup for Best Actor
1937	The Good Earth	Wang Lung	Released in sepia tone
1937	The Woman I Love	Lt. Claude Maury	
1937	The Life of Emile Zola	Émile Zola	New York Film Critics Circle Award for Best Actor; Nominated — Academy Award for Best Actor
1939	Juarez	Benito Juárez	
1939	We Are Not Alone	Dr. David Newcome	
1941	Hudson's Bay	Pierre-Esprit Radisson	
1942	Commandos Strike at Dawn	Erik Toresen	
1943	Stage Door Canteen	Himself	
1945	A Song to Remember	Prof. Joseph Elsner	Filmed in Technicolor
1945	Counter-Attack	Alexei Kulkov	
1946	Angel on My Shoulder	Eddie Kagle / Judge Fredrick Parker	
1952	Imbarco a mezzanotte	The Stranger with a Gun	called Stranger on the Prowl in the U.S.
1959	The Last Angry Man	Dr. Samuel "Sam" Abelman	Mar del Plata Film Festival Award for Best Actor; Nominated — Academy Award for Best Actor; Nominated — New York Film Critics Circle Award for Best Actor

== Radio appearances ==
Program	Episode	Airdate
Lux Radio Theatre	The Story of Louis Pasteur	1936
Lux Radio Theatre	"The Life of Emile Zola"	May 8, 1939
Cavalcade of America	"Edwin Booth"	March 31, 1941
The Free Company	"The Miracle Of The Danube"	April 27, 1941
Cavalcade of America	"Bolivar, The Liberator"	October 6, 1941
Cavalcade of America	"Eagle's Nest"	December 28, 1942
Radio Hall of Fame	"No Uncommon Clay"	April 30, 1944
Suspense Theater	"The Search For Henri Leferve"	July 6, 1944
Arch Oboler's Plays	"This Living Book"	October 11, 1945
Academy Award Theater		April 13, 1946
Eternal Light	"And It Came To Pass"	December 7, 1947
Studio One	"Amazing Dr. Clitterhouse"	January 20, 1948
Cavalcade of America	"Alerting of Dr. Pomerantz"	February 16, 1948
Cavalcade of America	"Garden Key"	November 8, 1948
Biography in Sound	"Clarence Darrow"	September 13, 1956

== See also ==
- List of actors with Academy Award nominations
- List of German-speaking Academy Award winners and nominees
