= John W. Dutko =

United States Army Medal of Honor recipient (1916–1944)

- Born: October 24, 1916; Dilltown, Pennsylvania, US
- Died: May 23, 1944 (aged 27) near Ponte Rotto, Italy
- Burial place: Beverly National Cemetery, Beverly, New Jersey
- Military career
- Allegiance: United States of America
- Branch: United States Army
- Service years: 1941–1944
- Rank: First Sergeant (posthumous)
- Units: 30th Infantry Regiment, 3rd Infantry Division
- Conflicts: World War II
- Awards: Medal of Honor; Purple Heart; American Campaign Medal

John W. Dutko (October 24, 1916 – May 23, 1944) was a United States Army soldier and a recipient of the United States military's highest decoration—the Medal of Honor—for his actions in World War II.

== Biography ==
Dutko joined the Army from Riverside Township, New Jersey in February 1941, and by May 23, 1944, was serving as a private first class in the 30th Infantry Regiment, 3rd Infantry Division. On that day, near Ponte Rotto, Italy, he single-handedly charged three German machine guns and one 88 mm artillery gun. Although wounded twice during his attack, he continued on and successfully destroyed all four positions before succumbing to his wounds. For this action, he was posthumously promoted to first sergeant and, on October 5, 1944, awarded the Medal of Honor.

Dutko, aged 27 at his death, was buried in Beverly National Cemetery, Beverly, New Jersey.

== Medal of Honor citation ==
Dutko's official Medal of Honor citation reads:

For conspicuous gallantry and intrepidity at risk of life above and beyond the call of duty, on 23 May 1944, near Ponte Rotto, Italy. Pfc. Dutko left the cover of an abandoned enemy trench at the height of an artillery concentration in a single-handed attack upon 3 machineguns and an 88mm. mobile gun. Despite the intense fire of these 4 weapons which were aimed directly at him, Pfc. Dutko ran 10.0 yards through the impact area, paused momentarily in a shell crater, and then continued his l-man assault. Although machinegun bullets kicked up the dirt at his heels, and 88mm. shells exploded within 30 yards of him, Pfc. Dutko nevertheless made his way to a point within 30 yards of the first enemy machinegun and killed both gunners with a hand grenade. Although the second machinegun wounded him, knocking him to the ground, Pfc. Dutko regained his feet and advanced on the 88mm. gun, firing his Browning automatic rifle from the hip. When he came within 10 yards of this weapon he killed its 5-man crew with 1 long burst of fire. Wheeling on the machinegun which had wounded him, Pfc. Dutko killed the gunner and his assistant. The third German machinegun fired on Pfc. Dutko from a position 20 yards distant wounding him a second time as he proceeded toward the enemy weapon in a half run. He killed both members of its crew with a single burst from his Browning automatic rifle, continued toward the gun and died, his body falling across the dead German crew.

== Awards and decorations ==

1st row	Medal of Honor Bronze Star Medal		
2nd row	Purple Heart	Army Good Conduct Medal	American Defense Service Medal
3rd row	American Campaign Medal	European–African–Middle Eastern Campaign Medal with four campaign stars	World War II Victory Medal
Unit awards	Presidential Unit Citation		

== See also ==
- List of Medal of Honor recipients
- List of Medal of Honor recipients for World War II
