= Chain gang =

Group of prisoners chained together

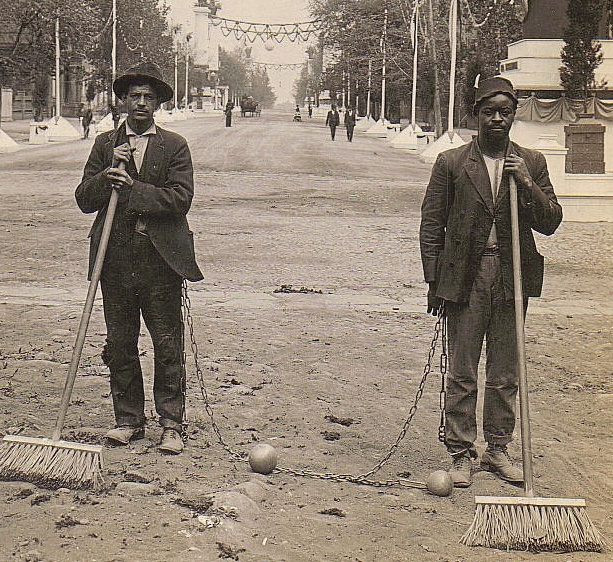
Chain gang street sweepers, Washington, D.C. 1909

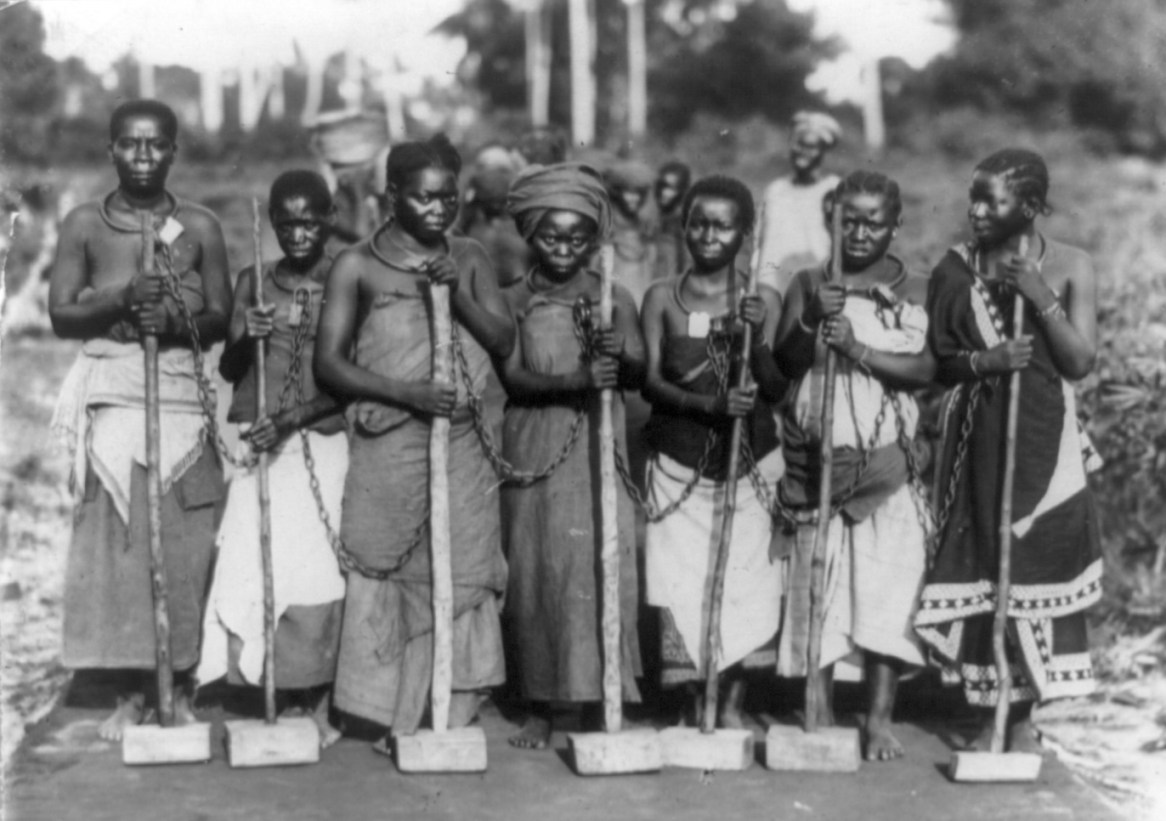
Female convicts in Dar es Salaam chained together by their necks, c. 1890–1927

A chain gang or road gang is a group of prisoners chained together to perform menial or physically challenging work as a form of punishment. Such punishment might include repairing buildings, building roads, or clearing land. The system was notably used in the convict era of Australia and in the Southern United States. By 1955, it had largely been phased out in the U.S., with Georgia among the last states to abandon the practice. Clallam County, Washington, U.S. still refers to its inmate litter crew as the "Chain Gang." North Carolina continued to use chain gangs into the 1970s. Chain gangs were reintroduced by a few states during the 1990s: in 1995, Alabama was the first state to revive them. The experiment ended after about one year in all states except Arizona, where in Maricopa County inmates can still volunteer for a chain gang to earn credit toward a high school diploma or avoid disciplinary lockdowns for rule infractions.

== Synonyms and disambiguation ==
A single ankle shackle with a short length of chain attached to a heavy ball is known as a ball and chain. It limited prisoner movement and impeded escape.

Two ankle shackles attached to each other by a short length of chain are known as a hobble or as leg irons. These could be chained to a much longer chain with several other prisoners, creating a work crew known as a chain gang. The walk required to avoid tripping while in leg irons is known as the convict shuffle.

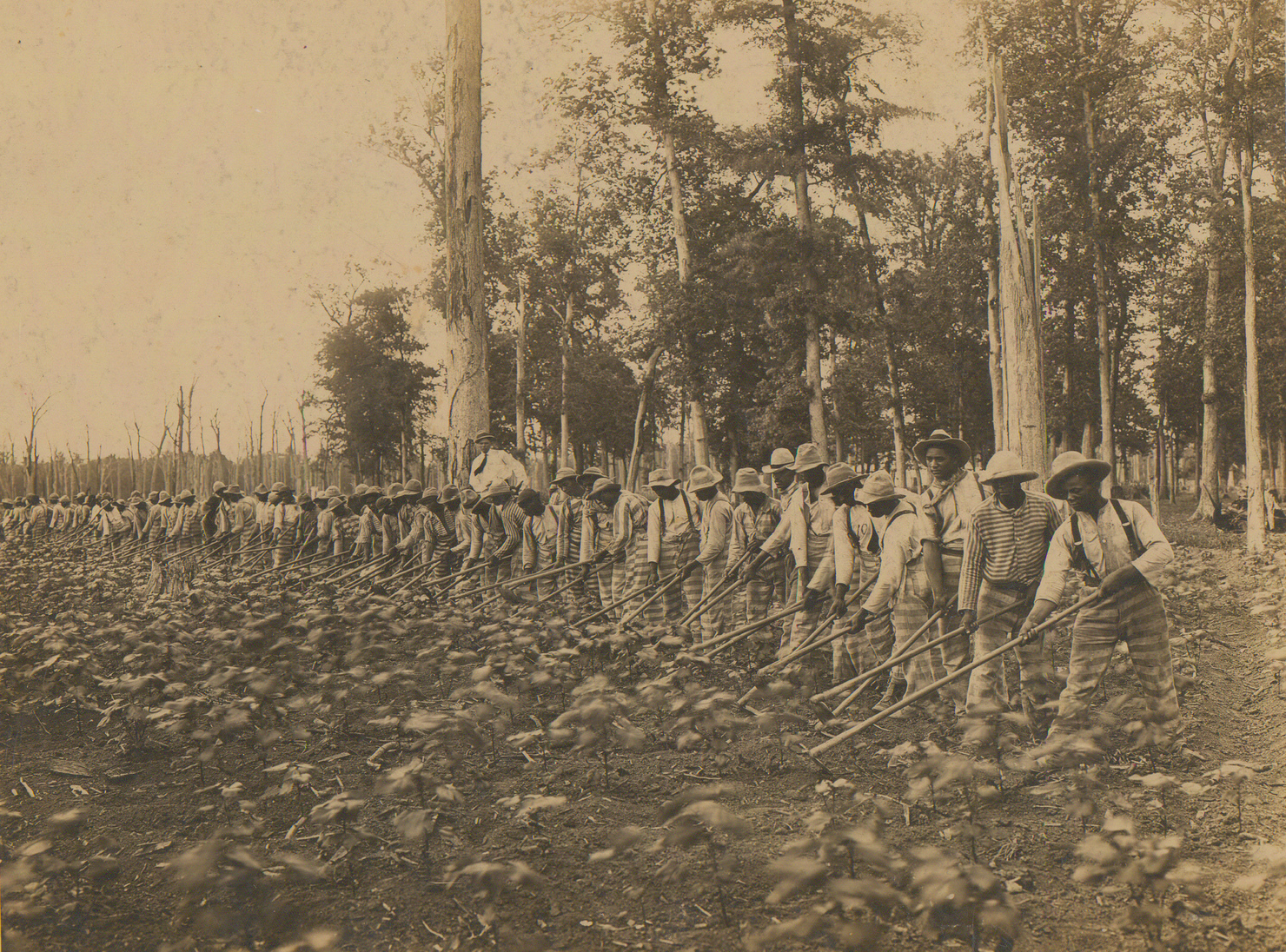
Parchman Farm chain gang, 1911

A group of prisoners working outside prison walls under close supervision, but without chains, is a work gang. Their distinctive attire (stripe wear or orange vests or jumpsuits) and shaven heads served the purpose of displaying their punishment to the public, as well as making them identifiable if they attempted to escape. However, the public was often brutal, swearing at convicts and even throwing things at them.

The use of chains could be hazardous. Some of the chains used in the Georgia system in the first half of the 20th century weighed 20 pounds (9 kg). Some prisoners suffered from shackle sores—ulcers where the iron ground against their skin. Gangrene and other infections were serious risks. Falls could imperil several individuals at once.

Modern prisoners are sometimes put into handcuffs or wrist manacles (similar to handcuffs, but with a longer length of chain) and leg irons, with both sets of manacles (wrist and ankle) being chained to a belly chain. This form of restraint is most often used on prisoners expected to be violent, or prisoners appearing in a setting where they may be near the public (a courthouse) or have an opportunity to flee (being transferred from a prison to a court). Although prisoners in these restraints are sometimes chained to one another during transport or other movement, this is not a chain gang—although reporters may refer to it as such—because the restraints make any kind of manual work impossible.

== Purpose ==
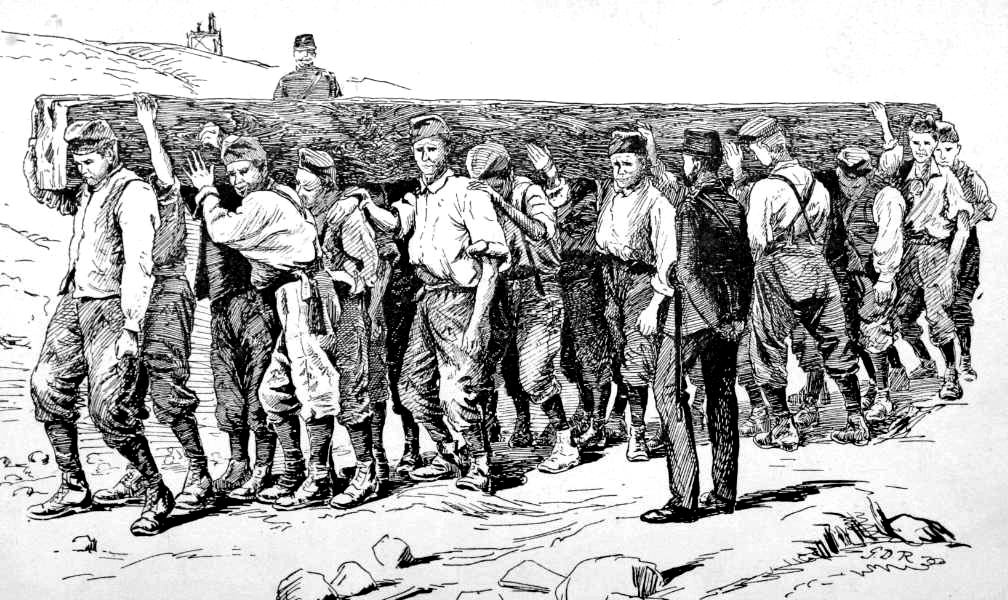
1894 illustration of chain gang performing manual labor

Various claims as to the purpose of chain gangs have been offered. These include:

- punishment
- societal restitution for the cost of housing, feeding, and guarding the inmates. The money earned by work performed goes to offset prison expenses by providing a large workforce at no cost for government projects, and at minimal convict leasing cost for private businesses
- a way of perpetuating African-American servitude after the Thirteenth Amendment to the United States Constitution ended slavery outside of the context of punishment for a crime.
- reducing inmates' idleness
- to serve as a deterrent to crime
- to satisfy the needs of politicians to appear "tough on crime"
- to accomplish undesirable and difficult tasks

== History ==
=== Australia ===
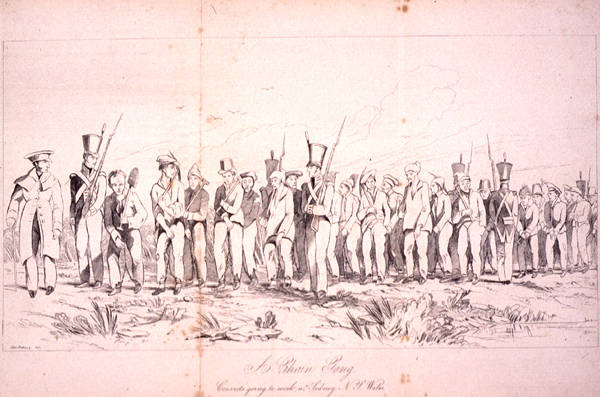
Illustration of a chain gang of 21 convicts in Hobart, Tasmania, in 1833, alongside six uniformed soldiers and a well-dressed man who is possibly a magistrate.

In the Australian penal colonies, chain gangs were also referred to as "iron gangs". They were used as a punishment for convicts who reoffended after being transported. Iron gangs were frequently employed on the construction of roads in remote areas where escape was a possibility, such as on the Great North Road from Sydney to the Hunter Valley and the road from Sydney to Bathurst over the Blue Mountains. The leg irons were installed by blacksmiths using hot rivets, and then attached to a single "gang chain" to allow for control by an overseer. The irons and chains could weigh as much as 4.5 kilograms (9.9 lb) or more. Some of the convicts on iron gangs were as young as 11 years old.

The use of iron gangs in the Colony of New South Wales was expanded by Governor Ralph Darling as part of his infrastructure program. Their tasks included "breaking rocks, clearing trees, [and] constructing stone culverts and bridges". In 1828, the colony's chief surveyor Edmund Lockyer directed that each iron gang could contain up to 60 men, supervised by one main overseer and three assistants. The iron gangs "received the worst and least trustworthy characters, together with the strictest security measures". Better-behaved convicts still worked in gangs but were unshackled. Convicts who escaped from iron gangs were described as "bolters" and became some of the first bushrangers.

=== United States ===
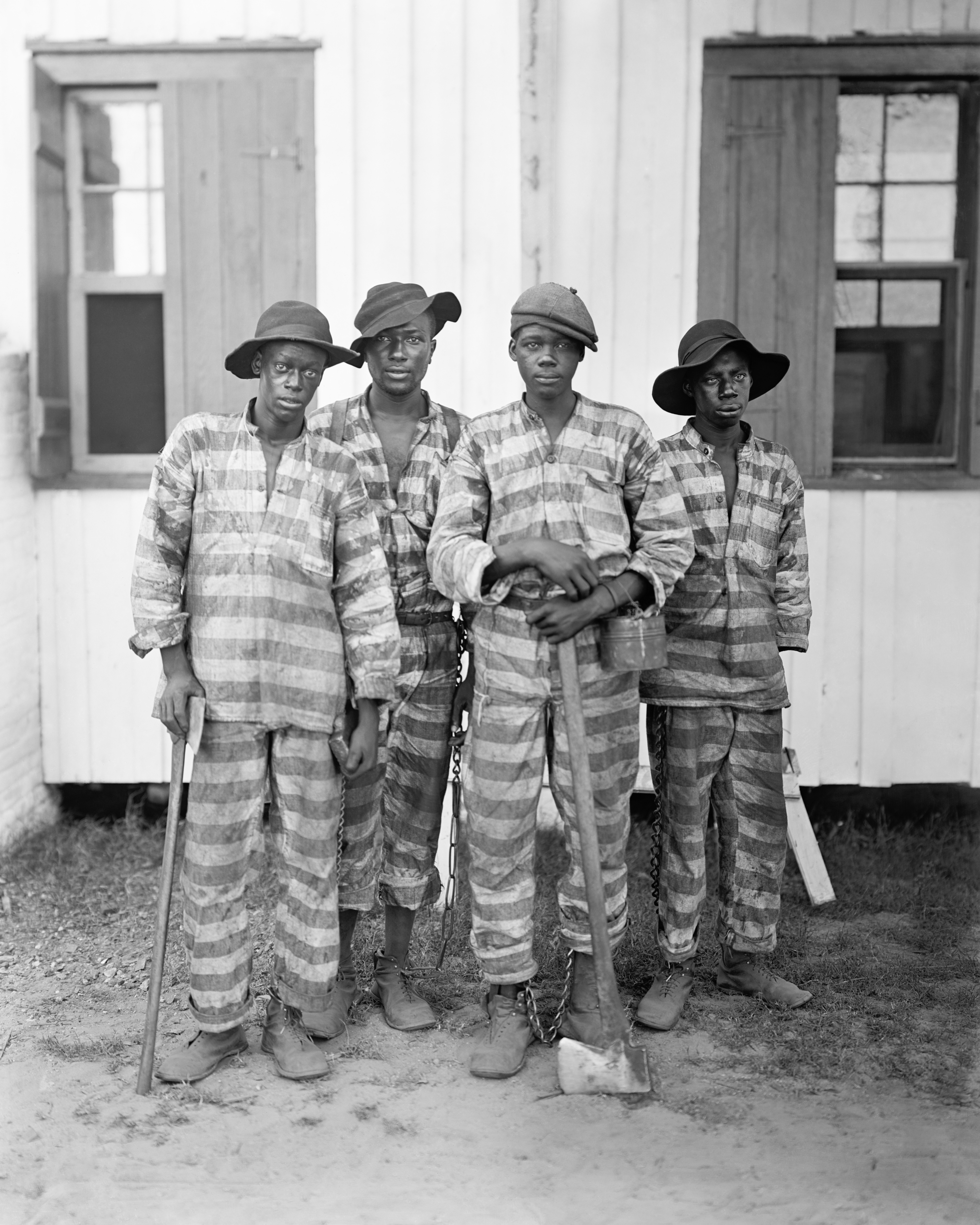
A chain gang in the Southern US, 1903

The introduction of chain gangs into the United States began after the American Civil War. The Southern states needed finances and public works to be performed. Prisoners were a free way for these works to be achieved.

The use of chain gangs for prison labor was the preferred method of punishment in some Southern states like Florida, Georgia, Louisiana, Virginia, North Carolina, Arkansas, Texas, Mississippi, and Alabama.

Abuses in chain gangs led to reform and to their general elimination by 1955. There were still chain gangs in the South in December 1955.

Chain gangs experienced a resurgence when Alabama began to use them again in 1995; they still existed in 1997.

=== Reintroduction ===
Several jurisdictions in the United States have reintroduced prison labor. In 1995 Maricopa County Sheriff Joe Arpaio reintroduced chain gangs in Arizona.

A year after reintroducing the chain gang in 1995, Alabama was forced to again abandon the practice pending a lawsuit from the Southern Poverty Law Center, among other organizations. The SPLC's attorney, J. Richard Cohen, said, "They realized that chaining them together was inefficient; that it was unsafe". Alabama Prison Commissioner Ron Jones was fired in 1996 for trying to put female prisoners on chain gangs. However, as late as 2000, Jones had proposed reintroducing the chain gang.

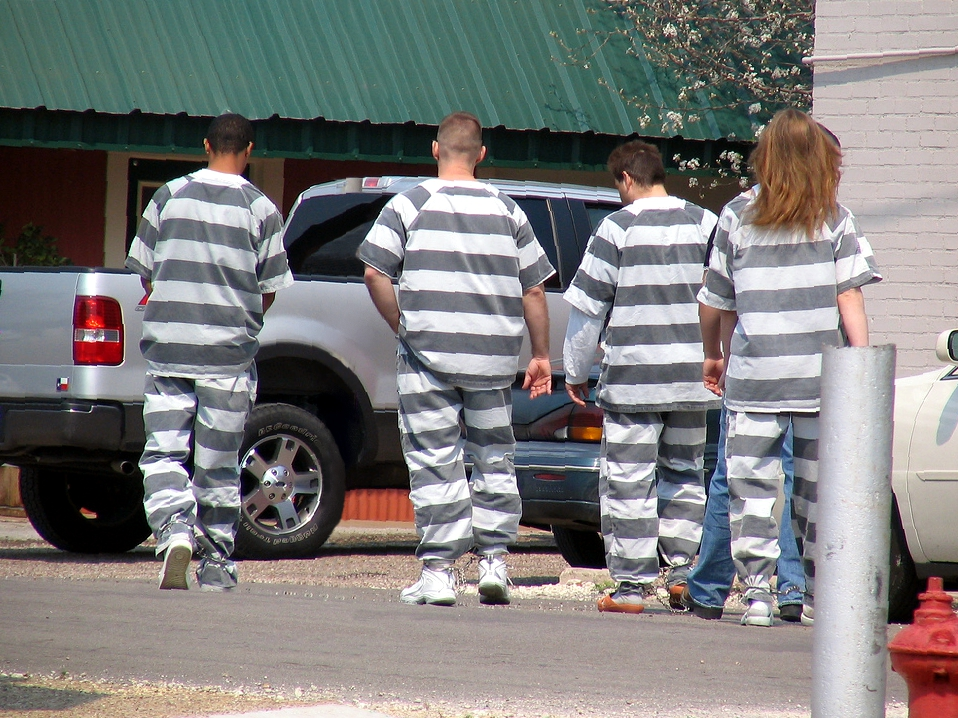
Chain gang of juvenile convicts in the US, 2006

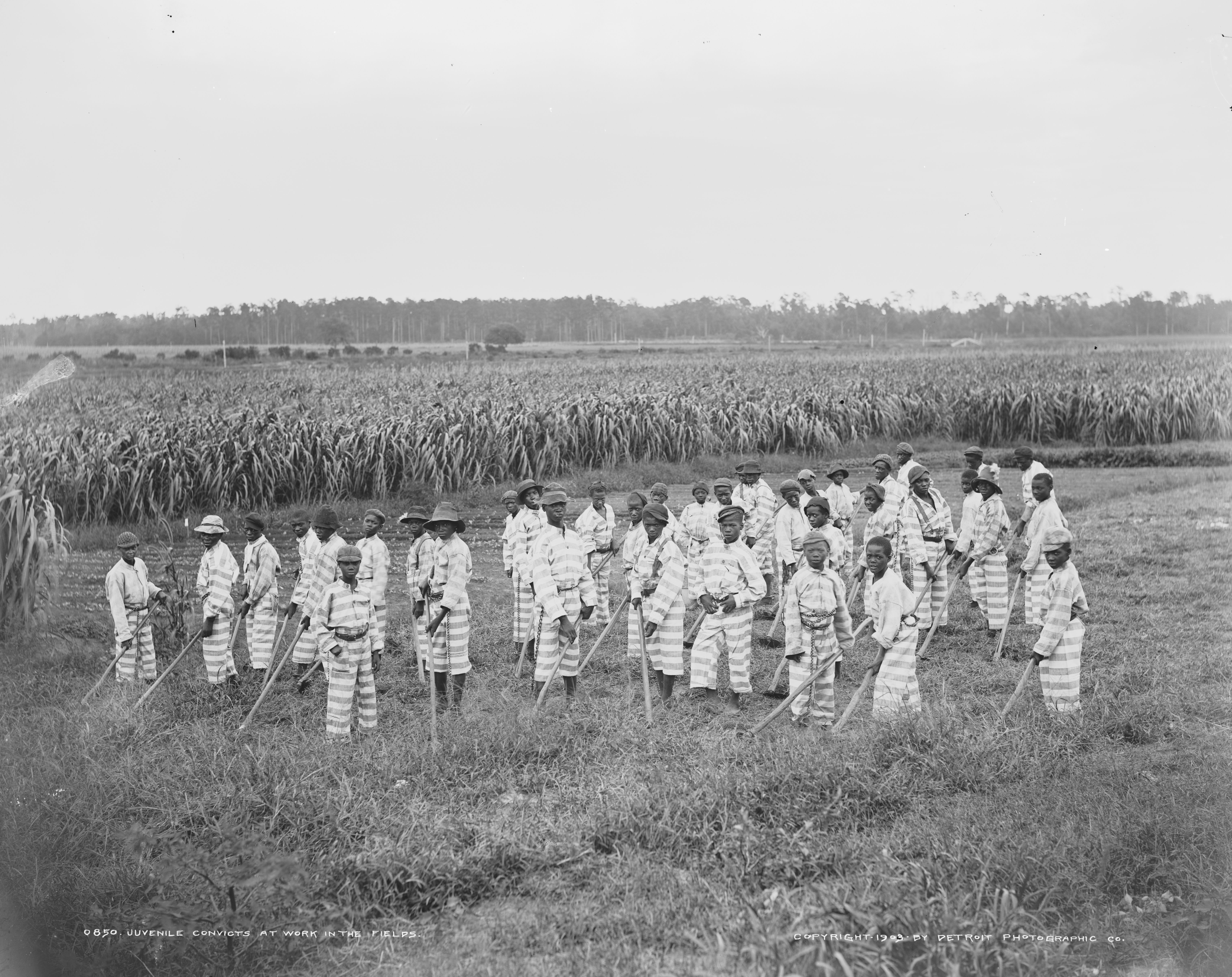
Chain gang of juvenile convicts in the US, 1903

In 2011, Tim Hudak, former leader of the Progressive Conservative Party of Ontario in Canada, campaigned on introducing penal labour in the province, referred to by many as chain gangs. He lost seats to the provincial Liberals which formed another majority government in the subsequent general election.

According to their own policies, Britain First (a British far-right political organization) want to reintroduce chain gangs "to provide labour for national public works". This is part of their aim to turn prisons from "cosy holiday camps" into "a place of hard labour".

In 2013, Brevard County Jail in Sharpes, Florida reintroduced chain gangs as a deterrent on crime in a pilot project. Ex-convict Larry Lawton, critical of this move, said, "Chain gangs send a bad message about our county", adding "I don't think people want to come to this county as a tourist or a beach person and see people in chains." Instead he proposed a better use of law enforcement resources would be to combat drug addiction because he says it is a "contributing factor" to criminal activity.

== See also ==
- Bucket brigade
- Penal labour
- Work song
- I Am a Fugitive from a Chain Gang
