= 2nd Academy Awards =

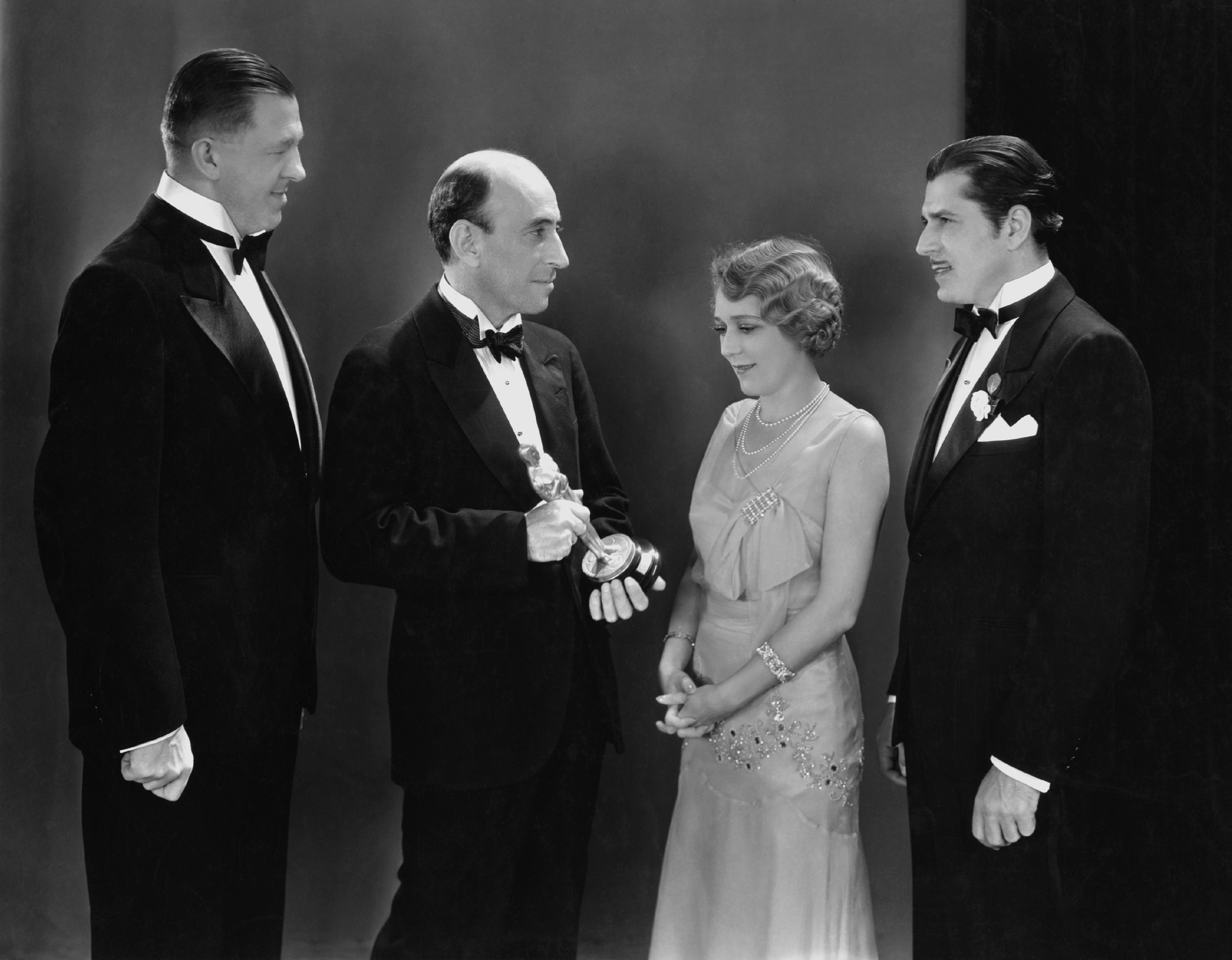
- Presenter William C. deMille (holding statuette) with Oscar winners Hanns Kräly, Mary Pickford, and Warner Baxter (left to right).
- Date: April 3, 1930
- Site: Ambassador Hotel, Los Angeles, California
- Hosted by: William C. deMille

Highlights
- Best Picture: The Broadway Melody
- Most awards: Seven films each received one award. (Note: At the 2nd Academy Awards (1928–1929), no film received more than one award. Seven films each received one Academy Award of Merit. To date, this result has never been repeated in subsequent Academy Awards ceremonies.)
- Most nominations: In Old Arizona and The Patriot (5)

The 2nd Academy Awards, presented by the Academy of Motion Picture Arts and Sciences (AMPAS) on April 3, 1930, at an awards banquet in the Cocoanut Grove of the Ambassador Hotel in Los Angeles, honored the best films released between August 1, 1928, and July 31, 1929. This was the first Academy Awards ceremony broadcast on radio, by local station KNX, Los Angeles. Over 300 attended the event, which included Academy members and guests.

The second ceremony included a number of changes from the first: most importantly, it was the first presentation for which the winners were not announced in advance, and the number of award categories was reduced from twelve to seven. It is unique in that there were never any official nominees; instead, AMPAS conducted further research and came up with a list of unofficial or de facto nominees using records of the films that the judges had given their opinions on. Chester Morris was the first nominee for Best Actor to be born in the 20th century.

Mary Pickford, a founding member of AMPAS and married to its first president, lobbied to be considered for the Best Actress award, inviting the judges over for tea at her home, while other actresses being considered for the same award were not made aware of their status.

Jeanne Eagels became the first and, to date, only actress to be posthumously nominated for Best Actress, for The Letter. The Divine Lady became the last film to win Best Director without receiving a Best Picture nomination.

This is the only year in which no film won more than one Oscar. The Broadway Melody became the second of seven films to win Best Picture without a writing nomination (preceded by Wings, and followed by Grand Hotel, Cavalcade, Hamlet, The Sound of Music, and Titanic), and the first of three to win Best Picture and nothing else (followed by Grand Hotel and Mutiny on the Bounty).

== Winners and nominees ==
=== Awards ===
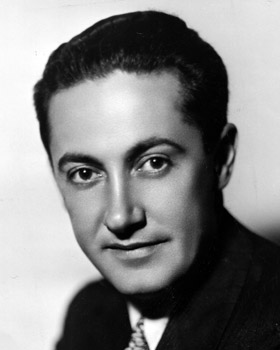
Irving Thalberg, Outstanding Picture co-winner

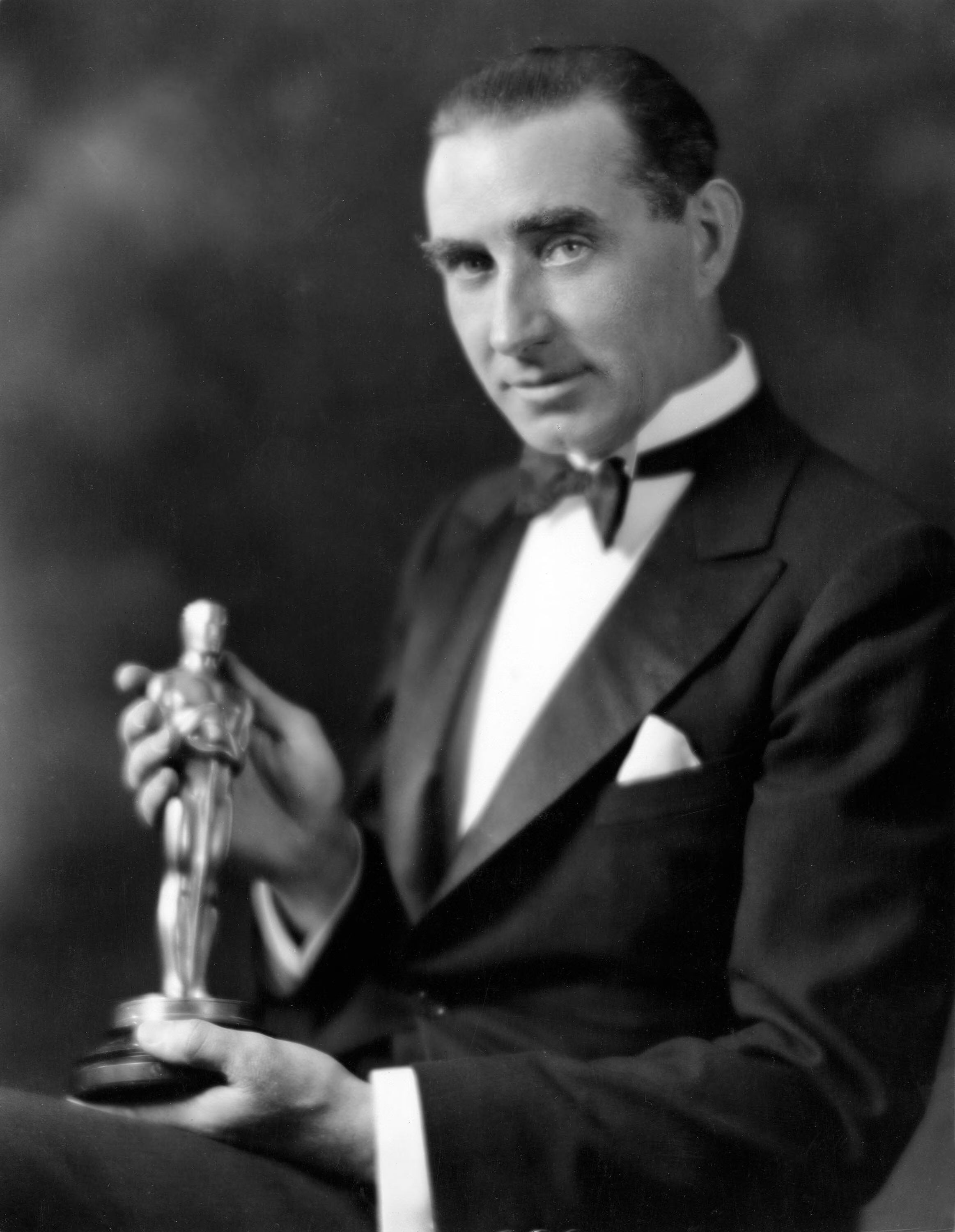
Frank Lloyd, Best Director winner

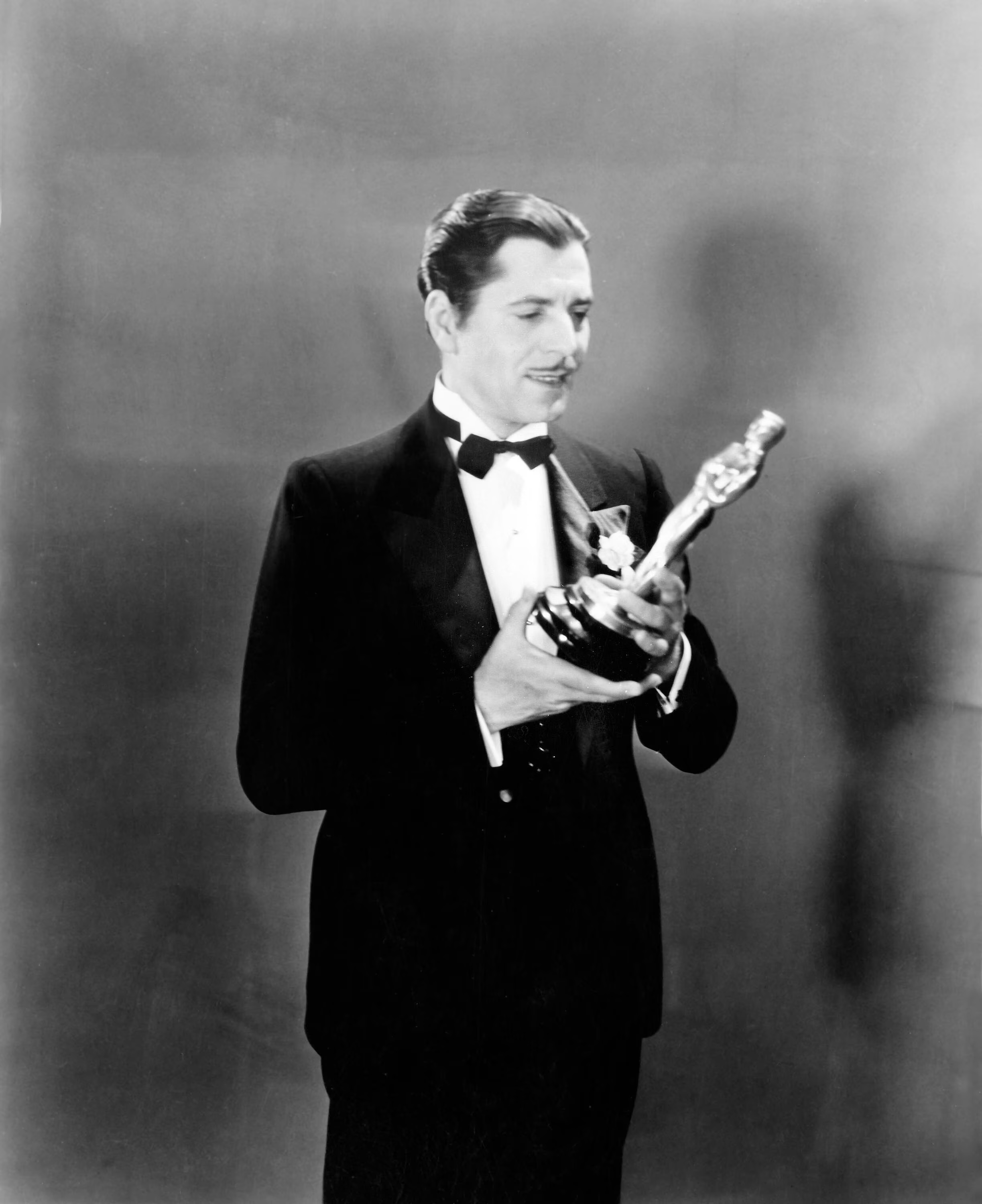
Warner Baxter, Best Actor winner

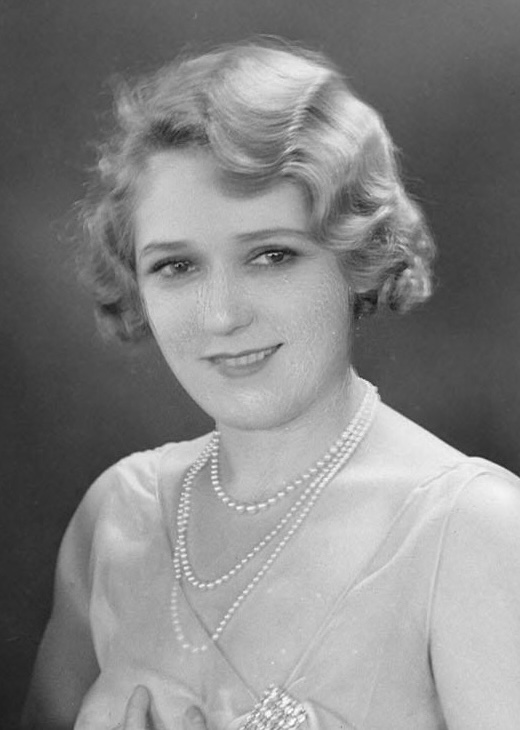
Mary Pickford, Best Actress winner

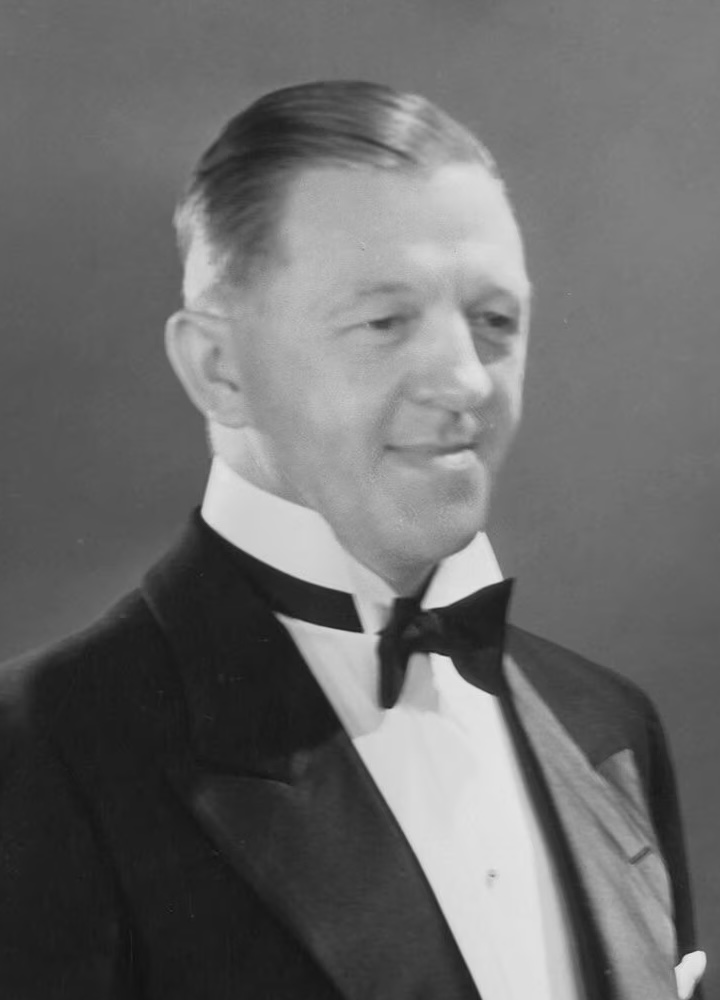
Hanns Kräly, Best Writing winner

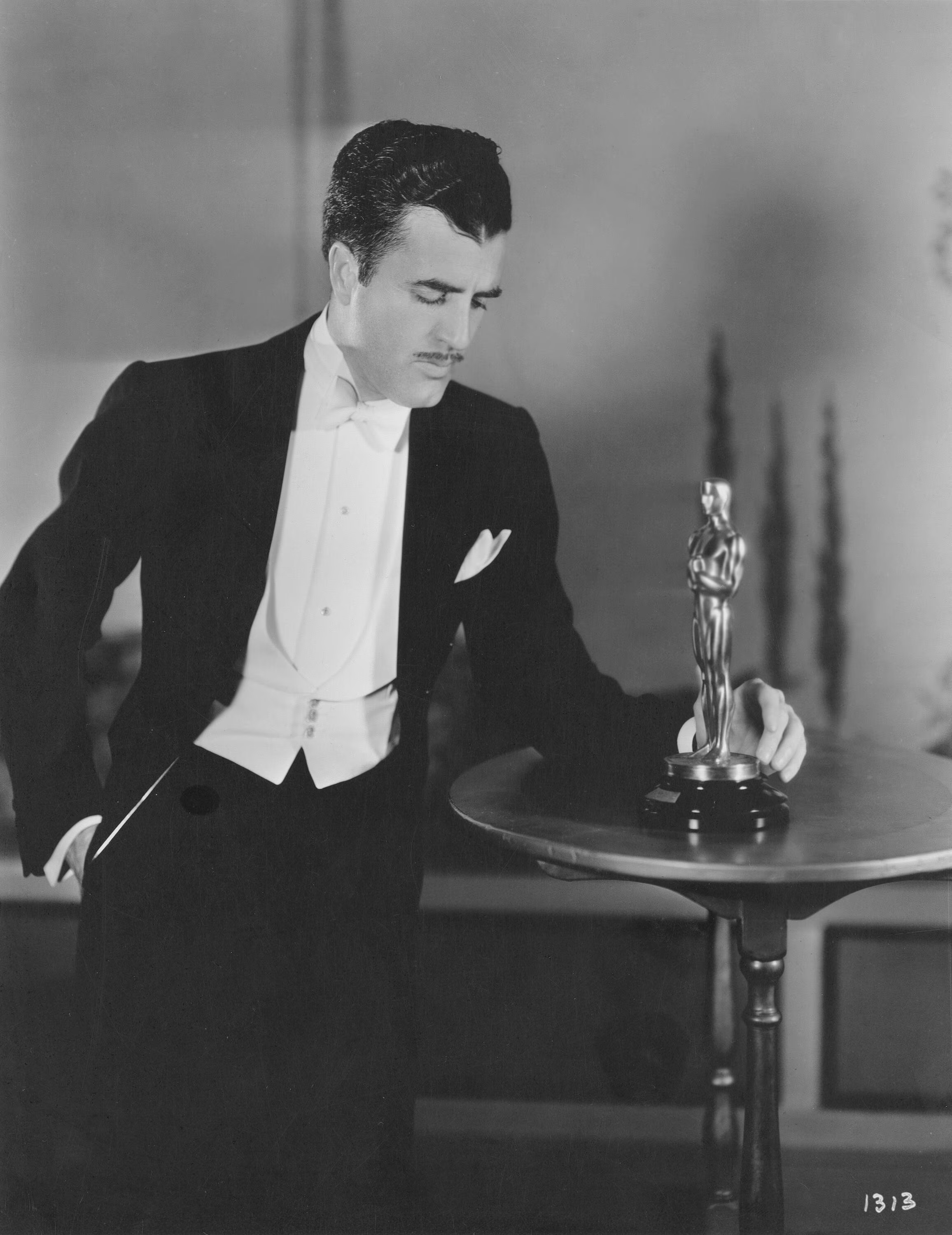
Cedric Gibbons, Best Art Direction winner

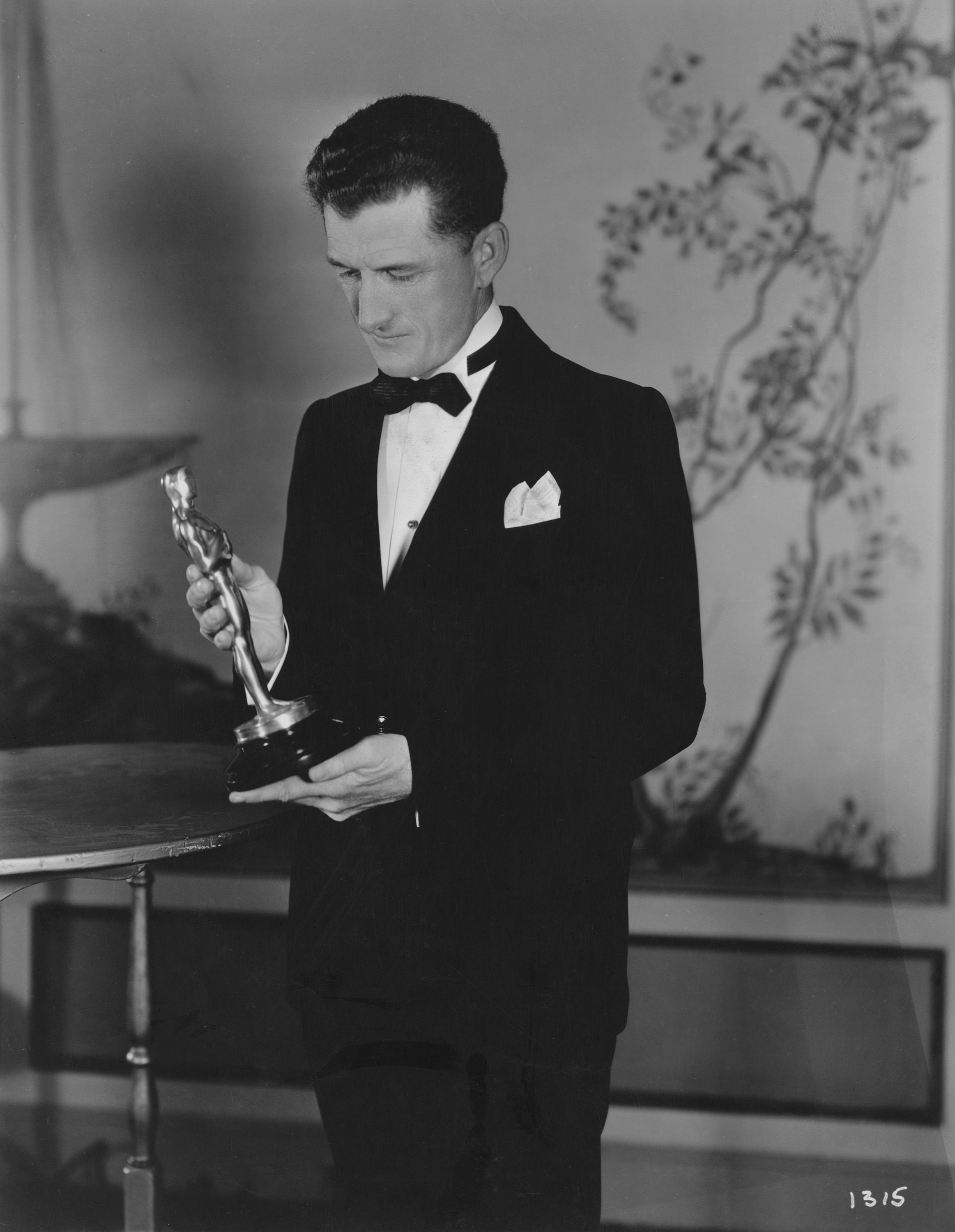
Clyde De Vinna, Best Cinematography winner

Nominees were announced on October 31, 1929. Winners are listed first and highlighted in boldface.

**Outstanding Picture**: **The Broadway Melody – Irving Thalberg and Lawrence Weingarten for Metro-Goldwyn-Mayer**; Alibi – Roland West for United Artists; The Hollywood Revue of 1929 – Irving Thalberg and Harry Rapf for Metro-Goldwyn-Mayer; In Old Arizona – Winfield Sheehan for Fox Film Corporation; The Patriot – Ernst Lubitsch for Paramount Pictures	**Best Director**: **Frank Lloyd – The Divine Lady**; Harry Beaumont – The Broadway Melody; Frank Lloyd – Drag; Irving Cummings – In Old Arizona; Lionel Barrymore – Madame X; Ernst Lubitsch – The Patriot; Frank Lloyd – Weary River
**Best Actor**: **Warner Baxter – In Old Arizona as The Cisco Kid**; George Bancroft – Thunderbolt as Thunderbolt Jim Lang; Chester Morris – Alibi as Chick Williams; Paul Muni – The Valiant as James Dyke; Lewis Stone – The Patriot as Count Pahlen	**Best Actress**: **Mary Pickford – Coquette as Norma Besant**; Ruth Chatterton – Madame X as Jacqueline Floriot; Betty Compson – The Barker as Carrie; Jeanne Eagels (posthumous nomination) – The Letter as Leslie Crosbie; Corinne Griffith – The Divine Lady as Emma Hart; Bessie Love – The Broadway Melody as Harriet "Hank" Mahoney
**Best Writing**: **The Patriot – Hanns Kräly, based on Ashley Dukes' translation of the play Der Patriot by Alfred Neumann, and the story "Paul I" by Dmitry Merezhkovsky**; The Cop – Elliot Clawson; In Old Arizona – Tom Barry, based on the story "The Caballero's Way" by O. Henry; The Last of Mrs. Cheyney – Hanns Kräly, based on the play by Frederick Lonsdale; The Leatherneck – Elliot Clawson; Our Dancing Daughters – Josephine Lovett; Sal of Singapore – Elliot Clawson, based on the story "The Sentimentalists" by Dale Collins; Skyscraper – Elliot Clawson, based on a story by Dudley Murphy; The Valiant – Tom Barry, based on the play by Halworthy Hall and Robert Middlemass; A Woman of Affairs – Bess Meredyth, based on the novel The Green Hat by Michael Arlen; Wonder of Women – Bess Meredyth, based on the novel Die Frau des Steffen Thromholt by Hermann Sudermann	**Best Art Direction**: **The Bridge of San Luis Rey – Cedric Gibbons**; Alibi – William Cameron Menzies; The Awakening – William Cameron Menzies; Dynamite – Mitchell Leisen; The Patriot – Hans Dreier; Street Angel – Harry Oliver
**Best Cinematography**: **White Shadows in the South Seas – Clyde De Vinna**; Four Devils – Ernest Palmer; The Divine Lady – John F. Seitz; In Old Arizona – Arthur Edeson; Our Dancing Daughters – George Barnes; Street Angel – Ernest Palmer

== Multiple nominations and awards ==
In Old Arizona and The Patriot, with five nominations each, tied the record for the film receiving the most Academy Award nominations. This record was set by 7th Heaven at the 1st Academy Awards (1927–1928). One year later, at the 3rd Academy Awards (1929–1930), the record was broken by The Love Parade, which garnered six nominations. The record for the film receiving the most Academy Award nominations – with sixteen nominations – is held by Sinners (2025). The previous record of fourteen nominations was held by All About Eve (1950), Titanic (1997), and La La Land (2016).

The following 9 films received multiple nominations:

Films with multiple nominations
Nominations	Film
5	In Old Arizona
5	The Patriot
3	Alibi
3	The Broadway Melody
3	The Divine Lady
2	Madame X
2	Our Dancing Daughters
2	Street Angel
2	The Valiant

== Changes to Academy Awards ==
Beginning with the 2nd Academy Awards (1928–1929), the following changes were made by AMPAS.

- Award categories were reduced from twelve to seven:
  - The awards for Best Director (Comedy Picture) and Best Director (Dramatic Picture) were merged into a single Best Director award.
  - The awards for Best Writing (Adaptation) and Best Writing (Original Story) were merged into a single Best Writing award (these would be split again for the 4th Awards).
  - The awards for Best Engineering Effects, Best Unique and Artistic Production, and Best Writing (Title Writing) were discontinued.

== Gallery ==
Academy Award-winning and nominated films – 2nd Academy Awards
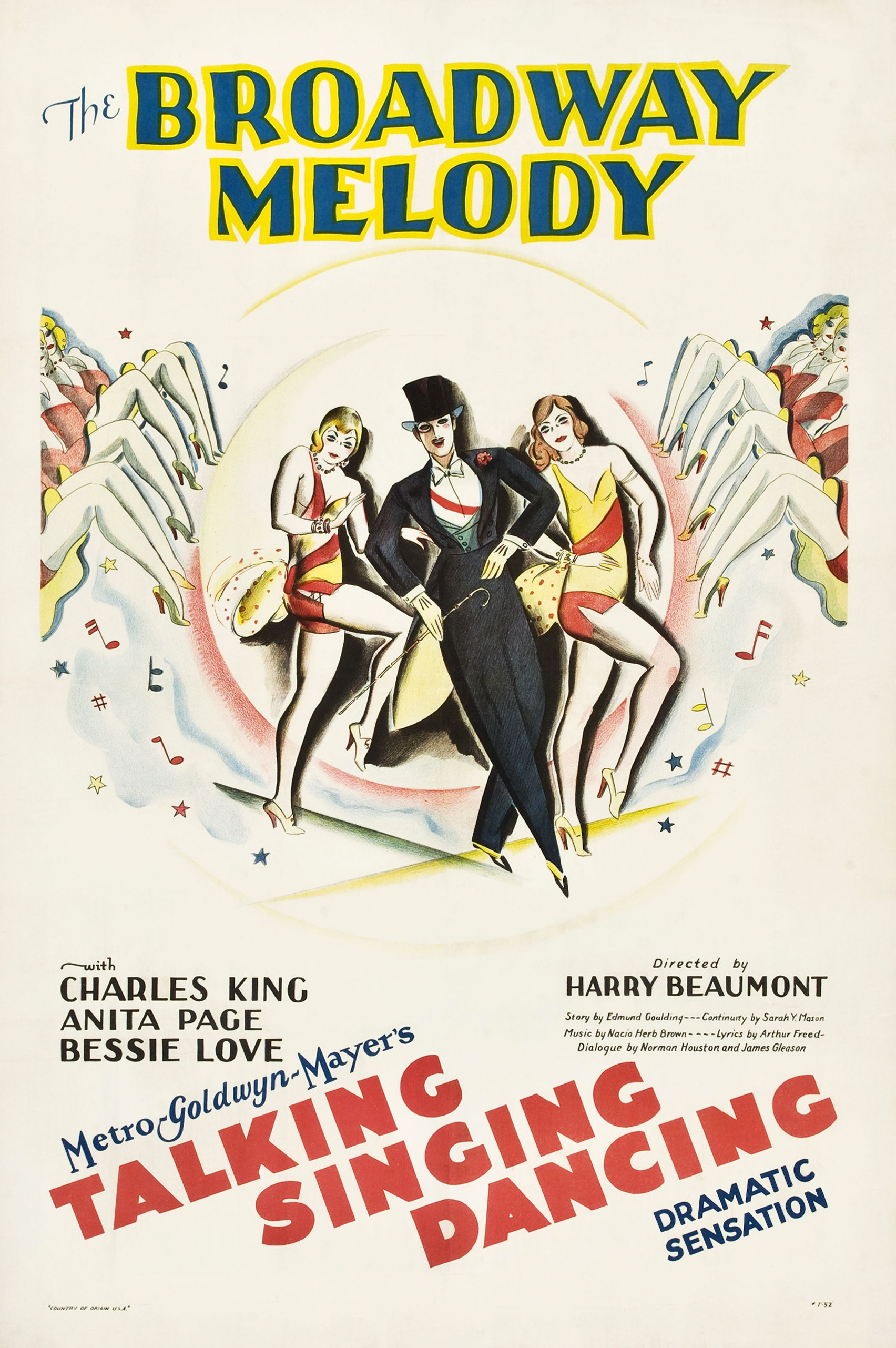
The Broadway Melody is the second film to win the Academy Award for Best Picture, which was at the time known as Outstanding Picture.

The full film of The Broadway Melody

The full film of The Hollywood Revue of 1929

The full film of In Old Arizona, which won Warner Baxter the award for Best Actor

The full film of White Shadows in the South Seas, which won for Best Cinematography

== See also ==
- 1928 in film
- 1929 in film
