= The Valiant (1929 film) =

1929 film

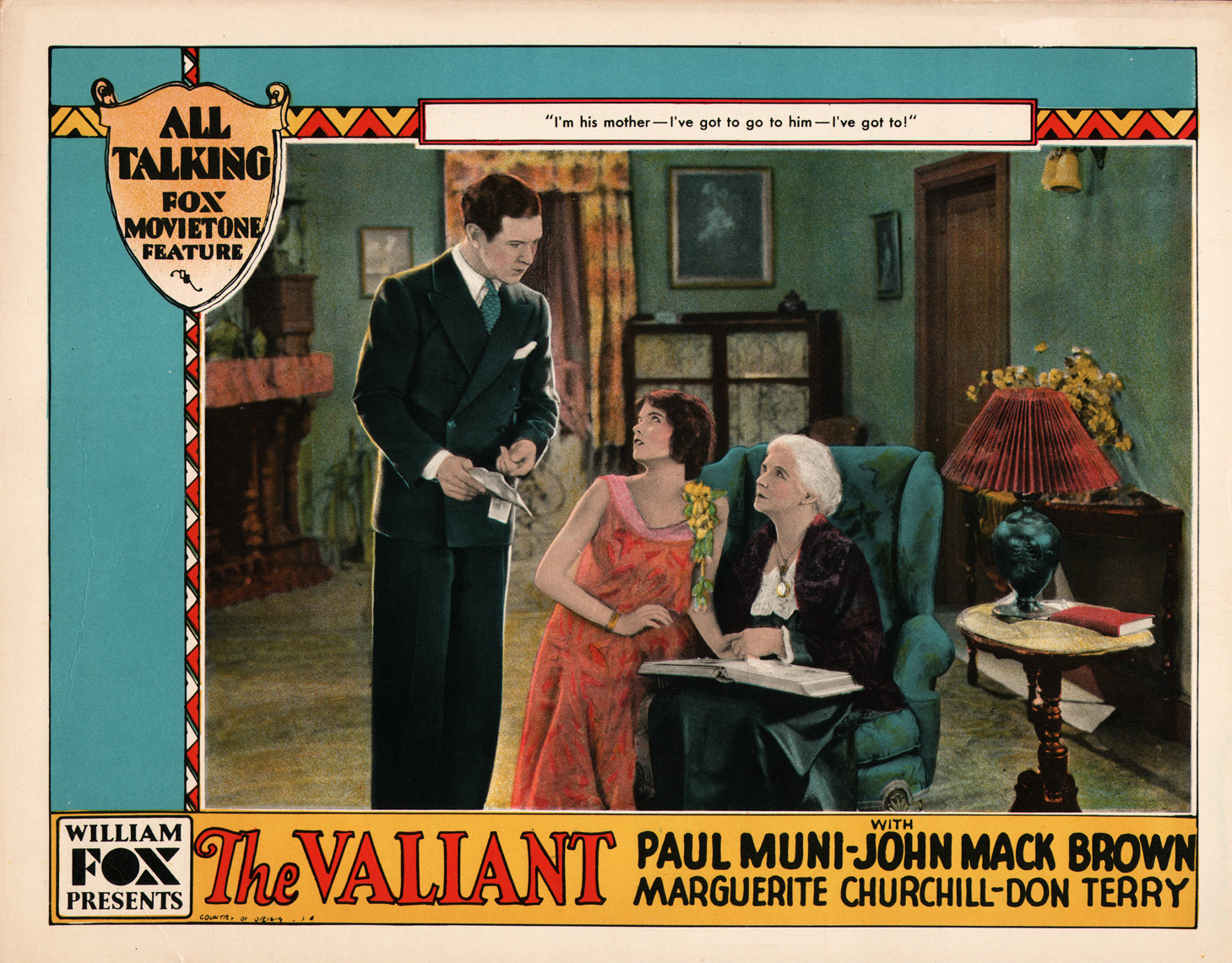
- Lobby card
- Directed by: William K. Howard
- Screenplay by: Tom Barry (adaptation); John Hunter Booth & Tom Barry (dialogue)
- Based on: The Valiant, a play by Halworthy Hall & Robert Middlemass
- Produced by: William K. Howard
- Starring: Paul Muni; John Mack Brown; Marguerite Churchill; Don Terry
- Cinematography: Lucien Andriot
- Edited by: Jack Dennis
- Distributed by: Fox Film Corporation
- Release date: May 19, 1929
- Running time: 66 minutes
- Country: United States
- Language: English

The Valiant is a 1929 American sound (All-Talking) pre-Code drama film released by Fox Film Corporation in the Fox Movietone sound-on-film system on May 19, 1929. It is produced and directed by William K. Howard (his first sound film) and stars Paul Muni (in his film debut), Marguerite Churchill (in her feature film debut), and John Mack Brown. Although described by at least one source as a silent film containing talking sequences, synchronized music, and sound effects, The Valiant has continuous dialogue and is a full "talkie" made without a corresponding silent version.

== Plot ==
The Valiant (1929)

=== Surrender of the condemned man ===
The credits (accompanied by organ music endemic to silent films), segue into a title card: "A city street-----where laughter and tragedy rub elbows." A crowded block lined with tenement buildings, on Manhattan's Lower East Side, comes into view, followed by a look into the hallway of one of those buildings, then a shot is heard, a door to one of the apartments opens and a man holding a gun backs out, closes the door, puts the gun in his pocket, then walks slowly down flights of stairs and into the busy street.

While he passes along sidewalks teeming with human activity, an Irish American policeman berates an arriving driver for parking in front of a hydrant, but when the driver removes his scarf, revealing a priest’s clerical collar, the abashed officer apologizes, ushers him into the car, and warns him not to park illegally on the beat of "that cop on the next corner, he's not one of us!” The cop steps on the running board and says that he will ride along and help with any traffic. They drive away, leaving the shooter standing on the sidewalk with his hand raised.

Continuing to walk through sidewalks crowded with children, the shooter pauses to help a small boy who has fallen and skinned his knee. Inside the police precinct, he approaches the desk lieutenant, who asks, "Well, what's on your mind?", he replies, "I killed a man", explaining that the victim lived at 191 East 8th Street, was named John Harris, and "deserved to die". Asked for his own name, he hesitates and, spotting a wall calendar (showing May 1928) with a large ad for "Dyke & Co., Inc.", says "Dyke... James Dyke". To "Why are you giving yourself up?", he answers "It was the only thing to do". He won’t answer questions about where he was born or where he lives, and a search reveals that any identifying tags have been removed from his clothes.

=== The condemned man is sentenced to be executed ===
The subsequent title card states: "Civilization demands its toll." In court, the trial is over and the judge appeals to the killer to think of those others who may be worrying about him. The killer is only willing to say “I never struck anybody in anger in all my life, but when I knew what he had done, I had to kill him." When God’s judgment is mentioned, he goes on to explain that God will judge him truly, because that other man will be there to tell the story that the court has not heard. God will know the truth. The judge proclaims, "it is the duty of this court to sentence you to be executed at the state's prison during the week of August seventeenth and may God have mercy on your soul.”

=== The condemned man's mother, sister and sister's fiancé ===
Another title card: "Meanwhile------in a far-away home...." In the backyard of a modest old countryside house, a young woman is attending to her collie dogs, while her mother is sitting nearby. A young man arrives and greets the mother as "Mrs. Douglas.” She addresses him as "Robert" and tells him that it was on a nice day like this that she last saw her son Joe, and one such s day she always hopes to see him again. Robert hands her "your Columbus paper" and goes to greet the young woman, "Mary", who calls him "Bob". He attempts to help Mary bathe one of the collies, but Laddie slips out of her grasp. When she falls trying to catch the dog, Bob kisses her long and hard, tells her he loves her and asks if she loves him. “I thought so”, she replies, and he tells her she will never be sorry. “I hope you won’t be”, she answers. Their mood is somber rather than cheerful. Although they may be referring to a proposal that happened off camera, the conversation and tone suggest that they have been lovers.

Mary's mother calls to them and shows them a photograph of "James Dyke" in the paper with the headline "CRIME DOESN'T PAY / Condemned Man's / Story Of His Life As / It Should Have Been / A LESSON TO YOUTH ON FOLLY OF CRIME / By The Man of Mystery". She tells them that he looks like the long-lost Joe, but Mary says that it must be a mistake. “Listen to what Bob has to tell you.” Bob asks for Mary’s hand in marriage, and Mary assured her mother that they will all live together afterwards.

=== The condemned man arrives at his final destination ===
The next title card describes "Gray walls, claiming their forfeits of liberty------and life." Prisoners are seen laboring in a field outside the prison and, as they return to the mess hall for a meal, a stage above the dining area features an orchestra consisting of African-American prisoners playing dance music for the prisoners as they eat.

"Dyke" has been transferred to this prison to await his execution. He is brought to the office of the warden who asks him about any family members whom he might like to contact, but the condemned man replies that he has no one, no mother or father or sister or wife or sweetheart, and his name is Dyke. Leaving the office, he hears the jaunty melody resonating from the dining area and says, "I didn't know you had music... here".

A newspaper's printing presses are seen churning out the evening edition with the headlines: "Mystery of Dyke's Identity / Secret as Hour of Death Nears / Prisoner Staunchly Refuses to Divulge / Secret of Himself or the Motive for / His Crime Though He Faces Chair / James Dyke Maintains Silence as He Writes News- / paper Articles Warning Youth on the Folly of Crime" One of the pressmen tells another that he heard the paper was paying Dyke $2,500 for his writings and another jokes that Dyke might be buying Liberty Bonds with the money and adds that he will probably do something with it before he dies ($2,500 in 1929 is worth $36,600 today using the CPI—a very conservative measure—or $76,500.00 using the “real” price)

=== Seeing the condemned man's photo, his mother insists on traveling to see him ===
Sitting in her bedroom, the infirm Mrs. Douglas visualizes old memories of teenage Joe telling his little sister Mary about being cast in a school production of a Shakespeare play—Macbeth, judging by his description of the “terrible witches”—and how, at bedtime, instead of "goodnight", he taught her to recite to him the "parting is such sweet sorrow" lines, while he would respond with "sleep dwell upon thine eyes...”. Meanwhile, in the living room, Mary and Bob are in the midst of a party to celebrate their engagement and, as the happy couple and invited guests dance, everyone joins in singing a fast chorus of "Hosanna, hosanna, sing hosanna today". Briefly leaving their guests to check on Mrs. Douglas, Mary and Bob hear from her that, despite fragile health, she has decided to make the long trip to visit "James Dyke" in prison. The possibility, however tiny, that he might be Joe is making the uncertainty unbearable. Mary, afraid the trip would kill her mother, offers to travel on her mother's behalf, with Bob accompanying her on the trip. She knows how to make herself known to Joe, if it is he.

As Mary and Bob sit in a moving train, a middle-aged woman asks inane questions of the conductor while a little girl comes over to Mary and Bob, tells them that her name is Suzanne and asks if they also have a little girl, prompting Mary to tell Bob that she couldn't marry him "if this man in prison should be my brother", because "it wouldn't be fair to you" and "people are cruel, they would never let you forget. He tells her not to be silly, but she says “That’s the way I feel.”

=== Section of the plot which corresponds to the one-act play on which the film is based ===
A title card reads "The test of the valiant." Dyke is escorted to the warden, who commends his exemplary behavior and asks what he wants done with the $2,500 in Liberty Bonds which are being held in the office for him. There must be someone to send them to. Yes there is, but that would give away his identity. Dyke adds that he'll think of something. Also present is the chaplain who, along with the warden, tries to convince him to see the young lady who traveled a thousand miles to speak with him in the hope that he might be her long-lost brother. The distance she has traveled gives Dyke pause and he eventually agrees, but requests privacy for the meeting, which is granted. The warden speaks with Mary alone, first, learning that she is from the (fictitious) town of Pennington in Ohio; that her father died when she was a baby; that her brother Joe, who is 10 years older than she, left home 15 years ago because "he wanted to be in the city" and has not been heard from since. She is certain, however, that she could recognize him from his reactions to their long-ago "goodnight" exchange of verses from Romeo and Juliet. She says them aloud for the warden to hear.

Dyke is brought into the office, but there is no sign of recognition. The warden introduces Mary as “the young lady who has come all the way from Pennington, Ohio, to see you”; he does not mention her name. The warden and the chaplain are in one room and the guard in the next, leaving the two alone, but with all doors open. After Mary's explanation of her reasons for coming, Dyke, who avoids making eye contact with her throughout most of the scene—denies being her brother and does not react to her questioning or to the verses, which he dismisses as silly. When Mary tells him that her mother is ill and will never really get better until she knows what happened to Joe, Dyke asks Mary what her name is. Mary Douglas, she replies. Douglas? he asks, thinking aloud, trying to remember. ..Joseph Anthony Douglas. “That‘s Joe” she cries. How...? Dyke tells her that when the war began he enlisted and went overseas for four years with the Canadians.

Her eyes never leave his face as he gives an animated description of an act of heroism — a young soldier showed great valor in risking his life, braving shot and shell to rescue a wounded officer, but dying when a 5.9 landed on them both. The dead hero's name was Douglas. Joseph Douglas. Joseph Anthony Douglas — Dyke remembers the name on the dog tags. If an officer had been there would have been a medal. Many men would have liked to die that way. He tells her to write to Ottawa for the official records. They’ll be able to tell her his battalion and when he went overseas and so forth, although the records are so confused that they might not tell her about his heroism. They might say he was missing or died of wounds or even served out to the end of the war and was honorably discharged: “They don’t know what happened to half the men.”

He asks her to take the unopened envelope (containing the Liberty Bonds) and give it to her mother—a sort of memorial to her son from the man who saw her son die. He asks that her mother buy a little gold star to wear for her boy. He asks Mary to do the same, and wear it over her heart When she says that she will sometimes think of him, he scoffs at the idea and says that he isn't fit to be mentioned in the same breath as her brother. Mary asks if there is anything she can do, and he responds that it would mean the world to him if she would say good-bye to him like the sister he never had. After a long, gentle hug, Mary starts to cry, wishing she could have said her special goodnight to her brother one more time. He tells her to say it and she does: “Good night, good night. Parting is such sweet sorrow that I should say goodnight ‘til it be morrow.”

She runs out sobbing, past the warden and the chaplain, who gaze at him, speechless. Then “James Dyke" tenderly recites, in the presence of the two men, “Sleep dwell upon thine eyes, Peace in thy breast. Would I were Sleep and Peace, so sweet to rest.” In a long speech, he thanks the warden for letting him see that girl, because he sees how lucky he is to be alone... ”If I had a family,” he says in a warning voice, “it would never be over for them. They would have to go on living and suffering.” The chaplain puts his hand on Dyke’s back and says, in a voice filled with compassion, “My son. “

It is time for the execution. Dyke says, “Alright, let’s go.”

=== The condemned man's family remembers him as a war hero ===
Back in Pennington, Mary and Bob sit at the piano, playing “Love's Old Sweet Song”, and talking of how much better it is now that her mother knows and is so very proud of her “hero boy.” Mrs. Douglas rests In a chair on the porch in front of the open door, hearing in her mind a marching band briskly playing "There's a Long Long Trail A-Winding" and seeing a parade of soldiers, while her young son, fresh-faced in his doughboy uniform, smiles down at her. Mary comes to the door and calls to her, saying “It’s getting chilly, hadn’t you better come in?” Her mother rises and, with only a little assistance from Mary, walks into the house. Bob, smiling, slowly closes the front door, revealing the Service Flag Star hanging on it.

== Cast ==
- Paul Muni as Man claiming to be "James Dyke", birth name Joseph Anthony Douglas
- Marguerite Churchill as Mary Douglas, younger sister of James Anthony Douglas
- John Mack Brown as Bob, who asks Mary Douglas to marry him
- DeWitt Jennings as Warden of the prison where "James Dyke" is held
- Edith Yorke as Mrs. Douglas, mother of Joseph Anthony Douglas
- Clifford Dempsey as Police lieutenant to whom "James Dyke" confesses the killing
- Richard Carlyle as Death row chaplain Father Daly
- Henry Kolker as Judge who sentences "James Dyke" to be executed

== Original source and adaptations ==
Screenwriters John Hunter Booth and Tom Barry adapted the 1926 one-act play by Holworthy Hall [on-screen credits indicate the name as Halworthy Hall] and Robert Middlemass, which twice closed on its respective Broadway opening nights: at the Nora Bayes Theatre on May 4, 1926 (with William L. Hildeburn in the leading role) and a revival (with John H. Brown) at the Frolic Theatre on May 8, 1928. The play, which has two lead and two supporting characters as well as one or two (depending on the staging) minor (jail attendant) characters, is described as taking place at "the Warden's office in the State's Prison at Wethersfield, Connecticut". Half an hour before the execution, the chaplain and the warden are making a final attempt at persuading "James Dyke" to reveal his identity. He is allowed to meet and converse with a young woman named Josephine Paris who believes that he might be her long lost brother. Following her departure, the condemned man, the chaplain and the warden exit the stage.

A fleeting character in the film, played by minor, unbilled, actor Henry Hall, is referenced as "Harold Everett Porter", the birth name of the play's co-author, credited as "Halworthy Hall", whose pen name was a nod to Holworthy Hall, the dormitory at his alma mater, Harvard University.

Filmed concurrently with The Valiant, its Spanish-language version, El valiente, directed for Fox by Richard Harlan, was screened in those foreign and domestic venues which requested such specific non-English-language versions of Hollywood product, and ultimately had its New York premiere in November 1930, 18 months after the original film completed its run. The protagonist was portrayed by Juan Torena, the role played by Marguerite Churchill went to Angelita Benítez, while John Mack Brown's part was taken by Guillermo del Rincón. Carlos Villarías who, the following year, would play Bela Lugosi's iconic role as Dracula in that production's concurrently filmed Spanish-language version, was cast in Henry Kolker's part as the judge.

=== Adaptations ===
Ten years later, Fox revived the property as The Man Who Wouldn't Talk, a B-picture directed by David Burton, with stars Lloyd Nolan, Jean Rogers, and Richard Clarke. Released in January 1940, the film followed Hall's and Middlemass' basic plot outline, but used a different screenplay, reworked by a number of writers, and appended an extended World War I flashback, resolving it all with a happy ending.

Among the plays presented live on post-World War II British television was a March 27, 1947 adaptation of The Valiant. The setting was a prison in Northern England and the cast included Andrew Osborn as Dyke, René Ray as Josephine Paris, Oliver Johnston as the chaplain and Ivan Samson as the prison governor.

There were also two adaptations during early days of the period referenced as the Golden Age of Television. On November 29, 1948, NBC's half-hour anthology drama program Chevrolet on Broadway presented Paul Muni in a live, abbreviated recreation of his film performance from nearly twenty years earlier, with Augusta Dabney, Whitford Kane and Curtis Cooksey. Almost two years later, on October 23, 1950, CBS' half-hour anthology drama Lux Video Theatre broadcast another abbreviated version, with Zachary Scott as the man claiming to be "James Dyke", Wendy Drew as "The Girl", Harold Vermilyea as Warden Holt, Graham Velsey as Father Daly and Hy Anzell as Dan.

== Seven Faces ==
Shortly after The Valiant's premiere on May 19, 1929, Fox cast the two leads, Paul Muni and Marguerite Churchill, in their next feature, Seven Faces, directed by Berthold Viertel, which was released less than seven months later, on December 1. Between 1929 and 1933, Marguerite Churchill appeared in a total of fifteen features, while Paul Muni acted in only five, with the remaining three being 1932's Scarface and I Am a Fugitive from a Chain Gang, followed by 1933's The World Changes.

== Two Academy Award nominations ==
At the 2nd Academy Awards, held on April 3, 1930, Paul Muni was one of the five nominees for Best Actor, but lost to Warner Baxter's portrayal of The Cisco Kid, O. Henry's legendary outlaw In Old Arizona. The Valiant's second nomination, Academy Award for Best Writing, went to Tom Barry for adapting Halworthy Hall's and Robert Middlemass' play to the screen (Barry was nominated for two titles, the other one being In Old Arizona) but the winner was one of the other four nominees, Hans Kraly, for his work on the Emil Jannings vehicle, The Patriot, a silent historical recreation of the 1801 assassination of Tsar Paul I of Russia.

== Preservation status ==
In 1994, film historian Jim Knusch, the host and writer of Manhattan Neighborhood Network's long-running public-access TV show Professor Kinema, interviewed William K. Everson, who had presented school-auditorium screenings of his 16mm preservation print of The Valiant in 1973 and 1977, and whose admiration of William K. Howard's directorial skill led him to rearrange the order of his given names, Keith William, so as to reflect the form "William K." In the course of the hour-long interview, Everson, who died less than two years later, recounted a lifetime devoted to film preservation and mentioned that during a 1950s stint as a member of the 20th Century Fox publicity department, he requested permission to make the preservation copy and, within a decade, when the studio's own 35mm film material had deteriorated, his copy of The Valiant turned out to be the only one known to exist.

Following restoration at George Eastman House, Turner Classic Movies presented The Valiant's television premiere on December 14, 2011.

== See also ==
- List of early sound feature films (1926–1929)
