= Holworthy =

Holworthy could refer to:

- Holworthy (surname)
- Harold Everett Porter (1887 – 1936), an American writer publishing under the name "Holworthy Hall"
- Holworthy Hall, a college dorm in Harvard University in Cambridge, Massachusetts, U.S.
- Holworthy Gate, a gate at Harvard University in Cambridge, Massachusetts, U.S.
- Mrs. Holworthy, a fictional character played by American actress Hedda Hopper in the 1929 film Girls Gone Wild
