= 1928 Academy Awards =

1928 Academy Awards may refer to:

- 1st Academy Awards, the Academy Awards ceremony that took place May 16, 1929, honoring films released in 1927 and 1928
- 2nd Academy Awards, the Academy Awards ceremony that took place April 3, 1930, honoring films released between August 1, 1928, and July 31, 1929
