= In Old Arizona =

1928 film

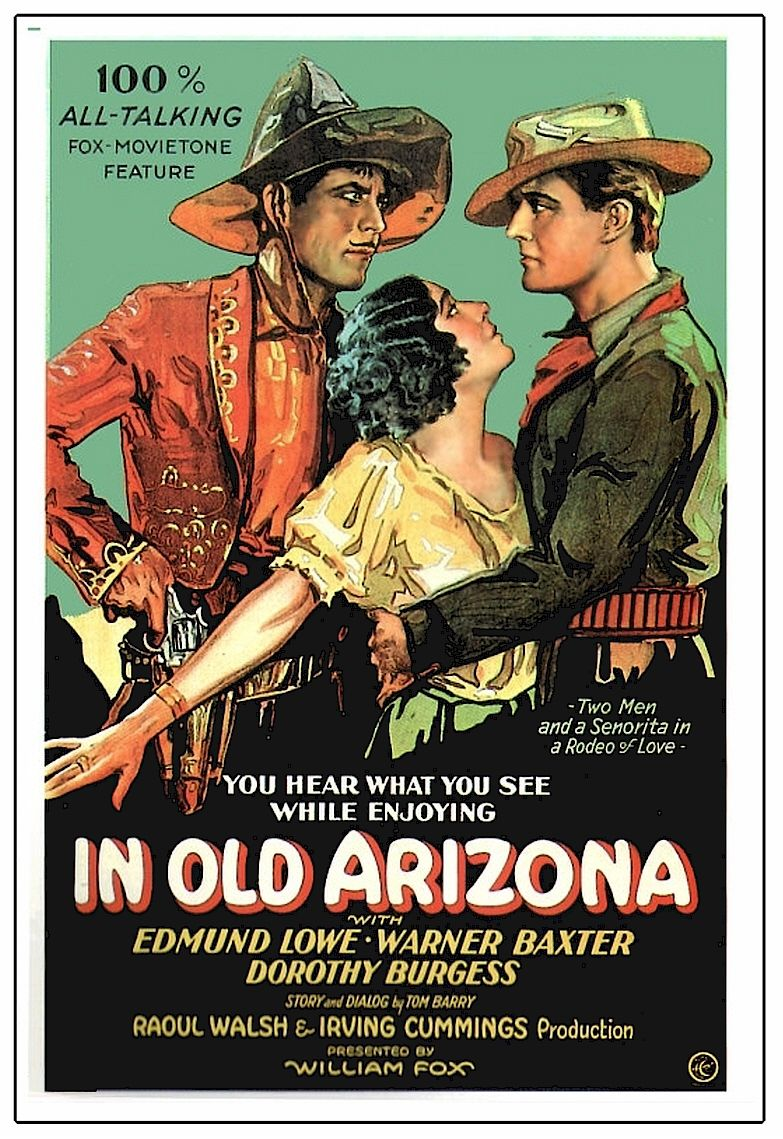
- Theatrical release poster
- Directed by: Irving Cummings; Raoul Walsh
- Written by: Tom Barry
- Based on: The Cisco Kid by O. Henry
- Produced by: Winfield Sheehan
- Starring: Warner Baxter; Edmund Lowe; Dorothy Burgess
- Cinematography: Arthur Edeson; Alfred Hansen
- Edited by: Louis R. Loeffler
- Distributed by: Fox Film Corporation
- Release dates: December 25, 1928 (Premiere); January 20, 1929 (General release)
- Running time: 95 minutes
- Country: United States
- Language: English sound film
- Box office: $1.3 million

In Old Arizona is a 1928 American sound (All-Talking) pre-Code Western film directed by Raoul Walsh and Irving Cummings, nominated for five Academy Awards, including Best Picture. The film, which was based on the character of the Cisco Kid in the 1907 story "The Caballero's Way" by O. Henry, was a major innovation in Hollywood. It was the first major Western to use the new technology of sound and the first talkie to be filmed outdoors. It made extensive use of authentic locations, filming in Bryce Canyon National Park and Zion National Park in Utah, and the Mission San Juan Capistrano and the Mojave Desert in California. The film premiered in Los Angeles on December 25, 1928, and went into general release on January 20, 1929.

In Old Arizona contributed to creating the image of the singing cowboy, as its star, Warner Baxter, does some incidental singing. Baxter went on to win the Academy Award for Best Actor for his performance. Other nominations included Best Director for Irving Cummings, Best Writing for Tom Barry, Best Cinematography for Arthur Edeson, and Best Picture. The film entered the public domain on January 1, 2024.

== Plot ==
Full film with synchronized sound

In Arizona, a bandit known as The Cisco Kid robs a stagecoach. Word of this deed reaches to Sergeant Micky Dunn, who is tasked by his superior to bring in the Cisco Kid dead or alive, with a $5,000 reward promised once he succeeds. They meet in a barber shop, though Dunn is unaware of the Cisco Kid's true identity and passes him off as a friendly civilian. When he leaves, the local blacksmith tells him that was the Cisco Kid, much to Dunn's chagrin.

The Cisco Kid is in a relationship with Tonia Maria, and visits her often. He loves her, but she has frequent affairs without his knowledge. Dunn and Maria meet each other and begin an affair. Dunn tells Maria that once he takes down the Cisco Kid, he will give the $5,000 reward to Maria, making her fall in love with him. They express their love for each other while the Cisco Kid secretly watches and listens nearby, learning of her betrayal.

She writes a secret letter to Dunn telling him to come that evening to take down the Cisco Kid before he makes his escape. However, the Cisco Kid finds this letter and replaces it with a fake letter "from Maria" which he has written himself. His letter says that he will be dressed up in Maria's clothes in an effort to disguise himself from Dunn, while Maria is actually in the Cisco Kid's clothes riding away. Dunn receives this fake letter, believing it to be from Maria. When the Cisco Kid leaves her house, Dunn shoots Maria, believing her to be the Cisco Kid in disguise. Now farther away, the Cisco Kid laments that "[Maria's] flirting days are over, and she can finally settle down". He then makes his escape.

== Cast ==
- Warner Baxter as The Cisco Kid
- Edmund Lowe as Sergeant Mickey Dunn
- Dorothy Burgess as Tonia Maria

== Production ==
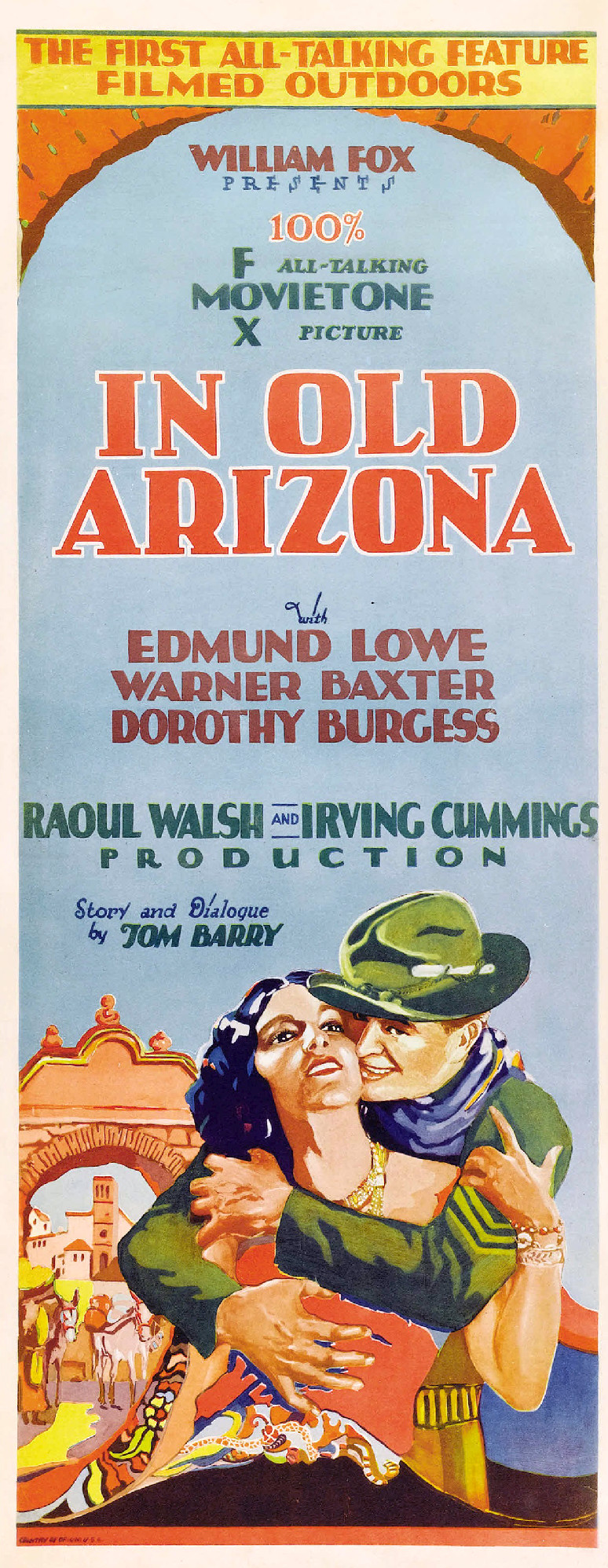
An alternate poster

Raoul Walsh was set to direct the film and star as the Cisco Kid, but had to abandon the project when a jackrabbit jumped through the windshield of a vehicle he was driving; the resulting wreck cost Walsh an eye. He never acted again, but continued his successful career as a film director.

== Music ==
The film features a theme song entitled "My Tonia" which was composed by B. G. De Sylva, Lew Brown and Ray Henderson.

== Awards and nominations ==
At the 2nd Academy Awards, the film won Best Actor for Warner Baxter's performance and was nominated for four other awards—Outstanding Picture; Best Writing (Tom Barry)—tied for most nominations of the year with The Patriot; and Best Cinematography (Arthur Edeson).

The February 2020 issue of New York magazine lists In Old Arizona as among "The Best Movies That Lost Best Picture at the Oscars".

== Preservation ==
The Academy Film Archive preserved In Old Arizona in 2004.

Under the Copyright Term Extension Act, this movie entered the public domain on January 1, 2024.

== See also ==
- List of films with the most Oscars per ceremony
- List of early sound feature films (1926–1929)
