= Tom Barry (screenwriter) =

American screenwriter

- Born: Hal Donahue; July 31, 1885; Kansas City, Missouri, U.S.
- Died: November 7, 1931 (aged 46); Los Angeles, California, U.S.
- Occupation: Screenwriter

Tom Barry (born Hal Donahue; July 31, 1885 – November 7, 1931) was a vaudeville sketch writer, playwright and screenwriter. He was nominated for two Oscars for Best Screenplay, for In Old Arizona and The Valiant at the 2nd Academy Awards.

== Selected filmography ==
- Under Suspicion (1930)
- In Old Arizona (1929)
- The Valiant (1929)
