= The Valiant (play) =

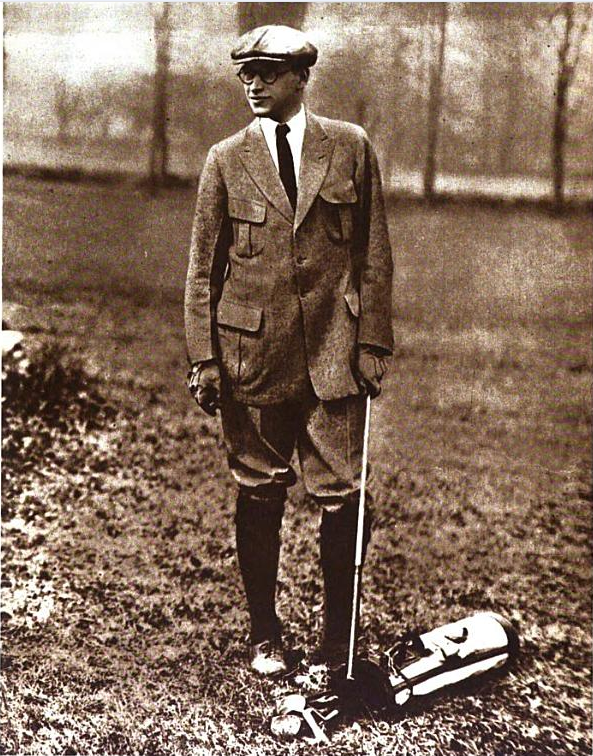
H. E. Porter, who used the pen name Holworthy Hall (a Harvard dormitory), circa 1917

The Valiant is a one-act play from the 1920s by Holworthy Hall and Robert Middlemass. It became a popular play for local theater groups, and is still performed today.

The play was copyrighted in 1920 and first appeared in McClure's magazine in 1921. It first appeared on the stage about 1924, and first appeared on Broadway (for one night) in 1926. Running with success in vaudeville (with Bert Lytell), it was made into a film of the same name in 1929 starring Paul Muni, and as The Man Who Wouldn't Talk in 1940. The play became a favorite for amateur and local theater groups.

== Characters ==
Referred to on the script (their name in the play)

- Father Daly (Father Daly) - a priest/minister who visits the condemned to get them to repent so they can enter heaven.
- The Warden (Holt) - watches and takes care of the prisoners and escorts them to the execution room.
- James Dyke (real name unconfirmed) - a mysterious condemned man who has no documented past and refuses to divulge it.
- The Girl (Josephine Paris) - sister of a long lost brother who journeys to Connecticut to find out if Dyke is her brother.
- The Jailer (Dan) - takes care of the scaffolds, keeps it in good order, and prepares the condemned for execution.
- The Attendant (Wilson) - files, types and well is a secretary...

== Summary ==
The play tells the story of James Dyke, a confessed murderer who has been sentenced to die and now awaits his fate on death row at a prison in Wethersfield, Connecticut. The only problem is that no one knows who he really is or where he comes from, and he is determined to take his secret to the grave. The prison's warden and chaplain have nearly given up hope of discovering his true identity until the night of Dyke's execution when a strange young woman arrives requesting to see him. Now, she may be the only key to unlocking Dyke's mysterious past. Questions are asked, and vague answers are given. Truth, fiction, or both. One question focuses on Shakespeare which is denied outright. However, the woman leaves thinking that James is not her brother, but after she walks out, he recites lines from both Romeo and Juliet and Julius Caesar. We are left with the impression that he is indeed her brother and he did not want to reveal his true identity so that his mother would think that her son died nobly in the war. However, this is up to interpretation.

== Performance and canonicity ==
The Valiant is frequently listed and anthologized as a very suitable play for production at festivals, in educational programs for troubled kids, in high schools, and by amateur groups in schools or churches.
