= The Man Who Wouldn't Talk (1940 film) =

1940 film

- Directed by: David Burton
- Written by: Clark Andrews; Lou Breslow; David Burton; Robert Ellis; Edward Ettinger; Owen Francis; Holworthy Hall; Helen Logan; Robert Middlemass; Lester Ziffren
- Produced by: Sol M. Wurtzel
- Starring: Lloyd Nolan; Jean Rogers; Richard Clarke
- Cinematography: Virgil Miller
- Edited by: Alex Troffey
- Music by: Samuel Kaylin
- Production company: Twentieth Century Fox
- Distributed by: Twentieth Century Fox
- Release date: January 23, 1940
- Running time: 74 minutes
- Country: United States
- Language: English

The Man Who Wouldn't Talk is a 1940 mystery film directed by David Burton and starring Lloyd Nolan, Jean Rogers, and Richard Clarke. It is a remake of the 1929 film The Valiant which had starred Paul Muni, and was based on a play of the same name. It was Nolan's first film for Twentieth Century Fox, where he went on to be a successful star of B Movie mysteries such as the Michael Shayne series. Nolan's portrayal of the lead character was deliberately more subdued than Muni's had been, and the film was "opened up" with the addition of flashback scenes and other devices to make it less dialogue-based than the original.

== Plot ==
A man shoots dead a business leader and confesses to the killing, but refuses to say anything more than providing the name Joe Monday, which is obviously an alias. His attorney joins forces with a woman claiming that she is his sister and that he is really a soldier reported missing during World War I. Still, the accused refuses to offer further information. He is tried for murder, with the case seemingly hanging on events from over twenty years earlier when the dead man and the accused had served in the same infantry company in France.

== Main cast ==
- Lloyd Nolan as Joe Monday
- Jean Rogers as Alice Stetson
- Richard Clarke as Steve Phillips
- Onslow Stevens as Frederick Keller
- Eric Blore as Horace Parker
- Joan Valerie as Miss Norton
- Mae Marsh as Mrs. Stetson
- Paul Stanton as Attorney Cluett
- Douglas Wood as Walker
- Irving Bacon as Paul Gillis
- Lester Scharff as Henri Picot
- Harlan Briggs as Foreman in Jury
- Elisabeth Risdon as Jury Member
- Renie Riano as Lilly Wigham

== Bibliography ==
- Schlossheimer, Michael. Gunmen and Gangsters: Profiles of Nine Actors Who Portrayed Memorable Screen Tough Guys. McFarland, 2001.
