= The Six Best Cellars =

1920 film by Donald Crisp

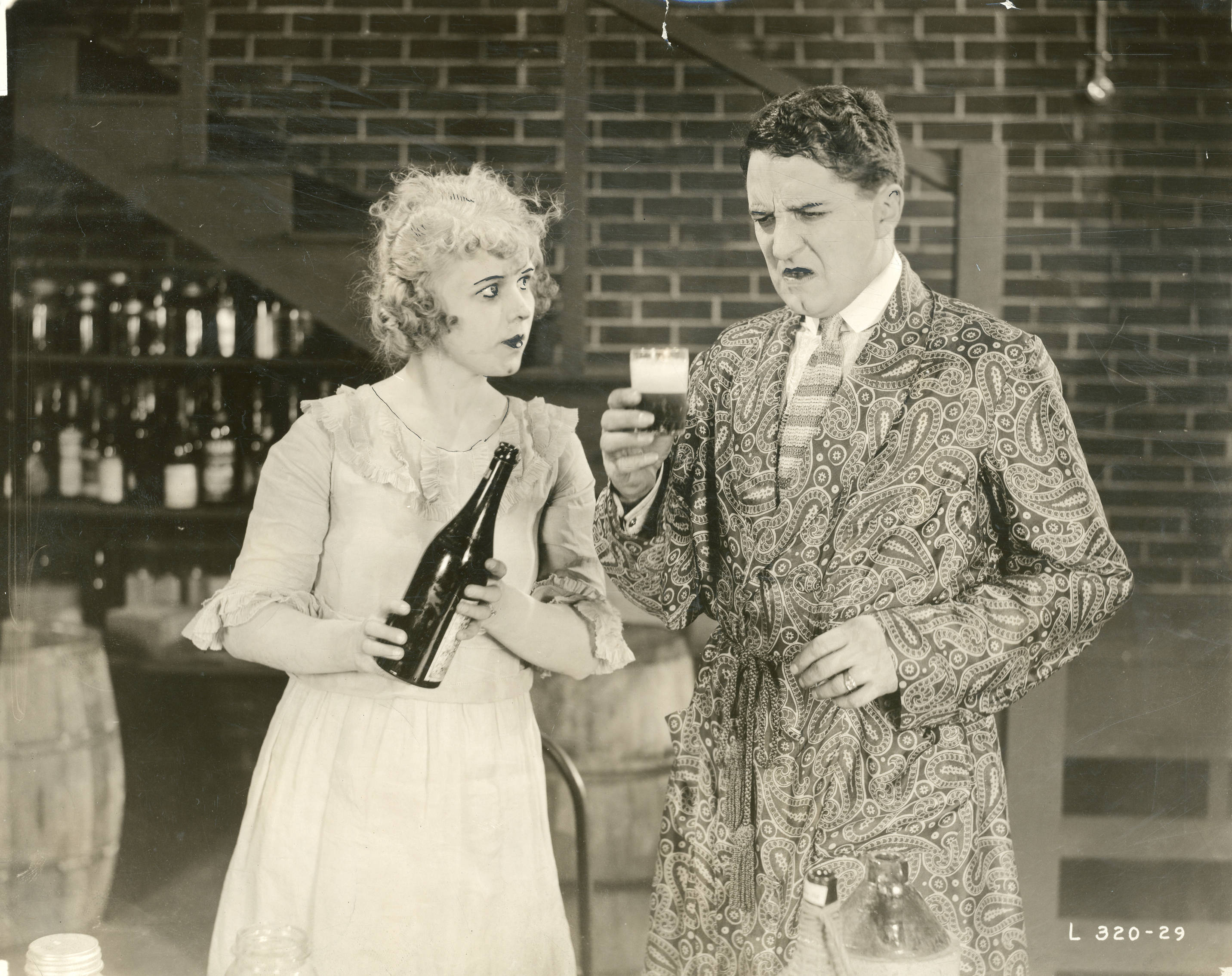
- Still with Wanda Hawley and Bryant Washburn
- Directed by: Donald Crisp
- Written by: Elmer Harris (scenario); Holworthy Hall (novel)
- Produced by: Adolph Zukor; Jesse Lasky
- Starring: Wanda Hawley; Bryant Washburn
- Cinematography: Charles Schoenbaum (as C. Edgar Schoenbaum)
- Edited by: Dorothy Arzner
- Distributed by: Paramount Pictures-Artcraft
- Release date: February 8, 1920
- Running time: 5 reels
- Country: United States
- Language: Silent (English intertitles)

The Six Best Cellars is a lost 1920 American silent comedy film directed by Donald Crisp and starring Bryant Washburn and Wanda Hawley. It was produced by Famous Players–Lasky and distributed by Paramount Pictures.

It was based on the 1919 novel The Six Best Cellars by Holworthy Hall, the pseudonym of Harold Everett Porter. The film was released just after prohibition in the United States went into effect on January 17, 1920.

== Plot ==
As described in a film magazine, Henry Carpenter finds his supply of liquor getting low and the price far too prohibitive once national prohibition goes into effect. At the same time, the social set to which he and his wife Millicent belong find liquor indispensable at dinner. An experiment in home brewing meets little success and the Carpenters are in danger of losing their social position when their set picks up with an ex-saloon keeper, who has a cellar full of choice liquors. Millicent's aunt finds four cases of what appears to be liquor in her cellar and turns it over to Henry to destroy. He immediately invites the set over to a big dinner, announcing that he has an abundance of wine. The guests arrive when he discovers that the cases contain "empties." To save the situation, he denounces liquor and says that he had decided not to serve any. Henry immediately becomes a "dry" hero, is made vestryman at the church and a bank director, and is asked to run for Congress. Then his wife's aunt calls again, reporting that she has found twenty-four full and genuine cases. Henry debates whether to return to his social set with the liquor or remain the dry champion with a chance to go to Washington. The film ends as he faces the audience and asks, "What would you do?"

== Cast ==
- Bryant Washburn as Henry Carpenter
- Wanda Hawley as Millicent Carpenter
- Clarence Burton as Ed Hammond
- Elsa Lorimer as Mrs. Hammond
- Josephine Crowell as Mrs. Teak
- Frederick Vroom as Mr. Teak
- Jane Wolfe as Virginia Jasper
- Richard Wayne as H. Sturtevant Jordan
- Julia Faye as Mrs. Jordan
- Howard Gaye as Tommy Blair
- Zelma Maja as Mrs. Blair
- J. Parker McConnell as Harris (credited as Parker MacConnell)
- Ruth Ashby as Mrs. Harris
- Allen Connor as McAllister (credited as Allan Connor)
- Lorie Larson as Mrs. McAllister

== Preservation ==
With no holdings located in archives, The Six Best Cellars is considered a lost film.
