= Robert Middlemass =

American actor and playwright (1883–1949)

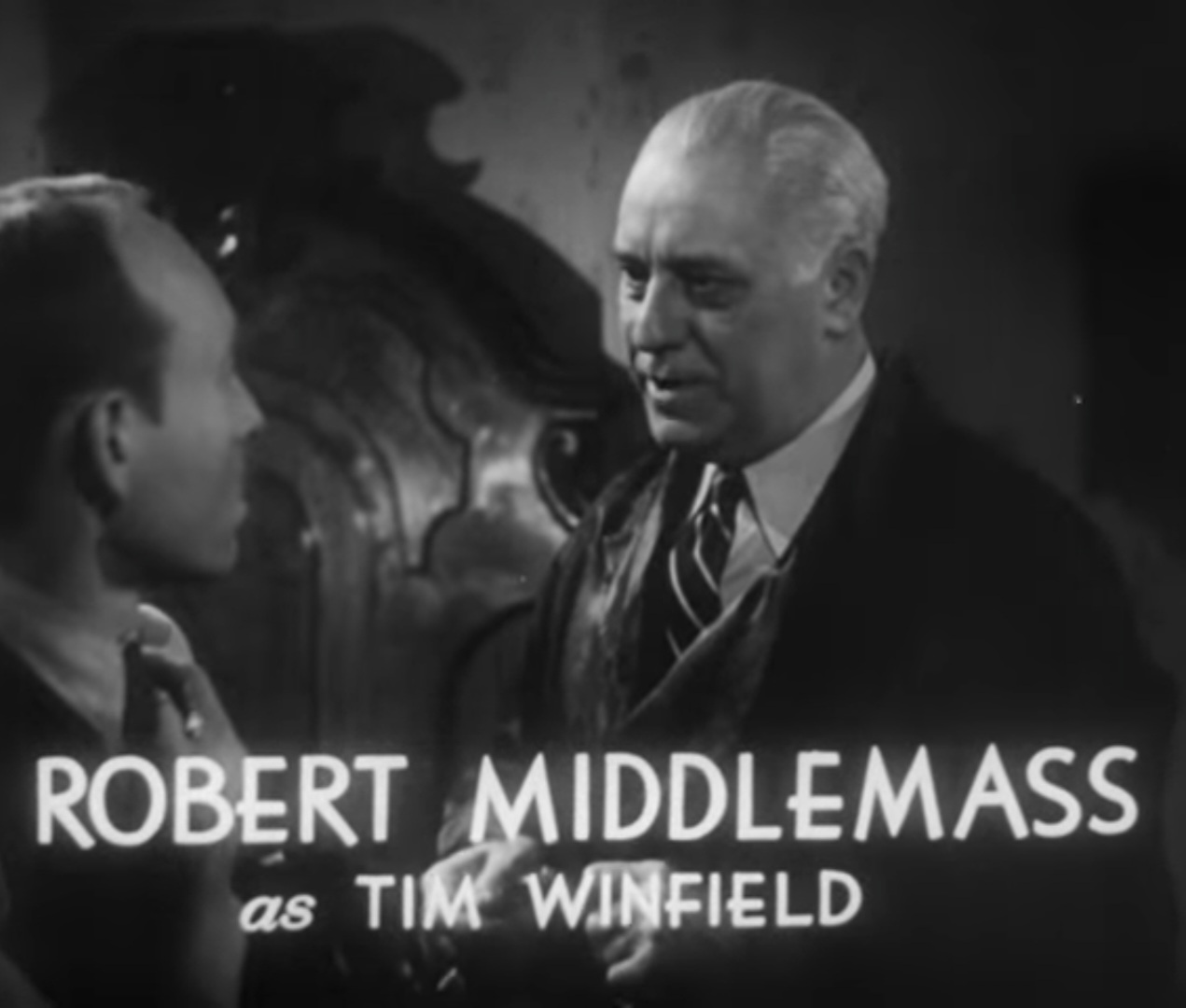
- Middlemass in The Black Raven (1943)
- Born: September 3, 1883; New Britain, Connecticut. U.S.
- Died: September 10, 1949 (aged 66); Hollywood, California, U.S.
- Occupations: Actor; playwright
- Years active: 1910–1947

Robert Middlemass (September 3, 1883 – September 10, 1949) was an American playwright and stage actor, and later character actor with over 100 film appearances, usually playing detectives or policemen.

== Biography ==
Middlemass was born in New Britain, Connecticut. He graduated from Harvard University in 1909 and initially went into the insurance business, but soon went on the stage, joining the Castle Square Theatre stock company in Boston. He debuted on Broadway in September 1914 in The Bludgeon at the Maxine Elliott Theatre.

His best known play was a one-act melodrama written with Holworthy Hall (real name H.E. Porter, a college roommate) titled The Valiant, which was also made into a film of the same name in 1929, and as The Man Who Wouldn't Talk in 1940. The play became a favorite for amateur and local theater groups and is still performed today.

Middlemass moved to Los Angeles around 1935 and began appearing in films. He died there in 1949.

== Select theatre credits ==
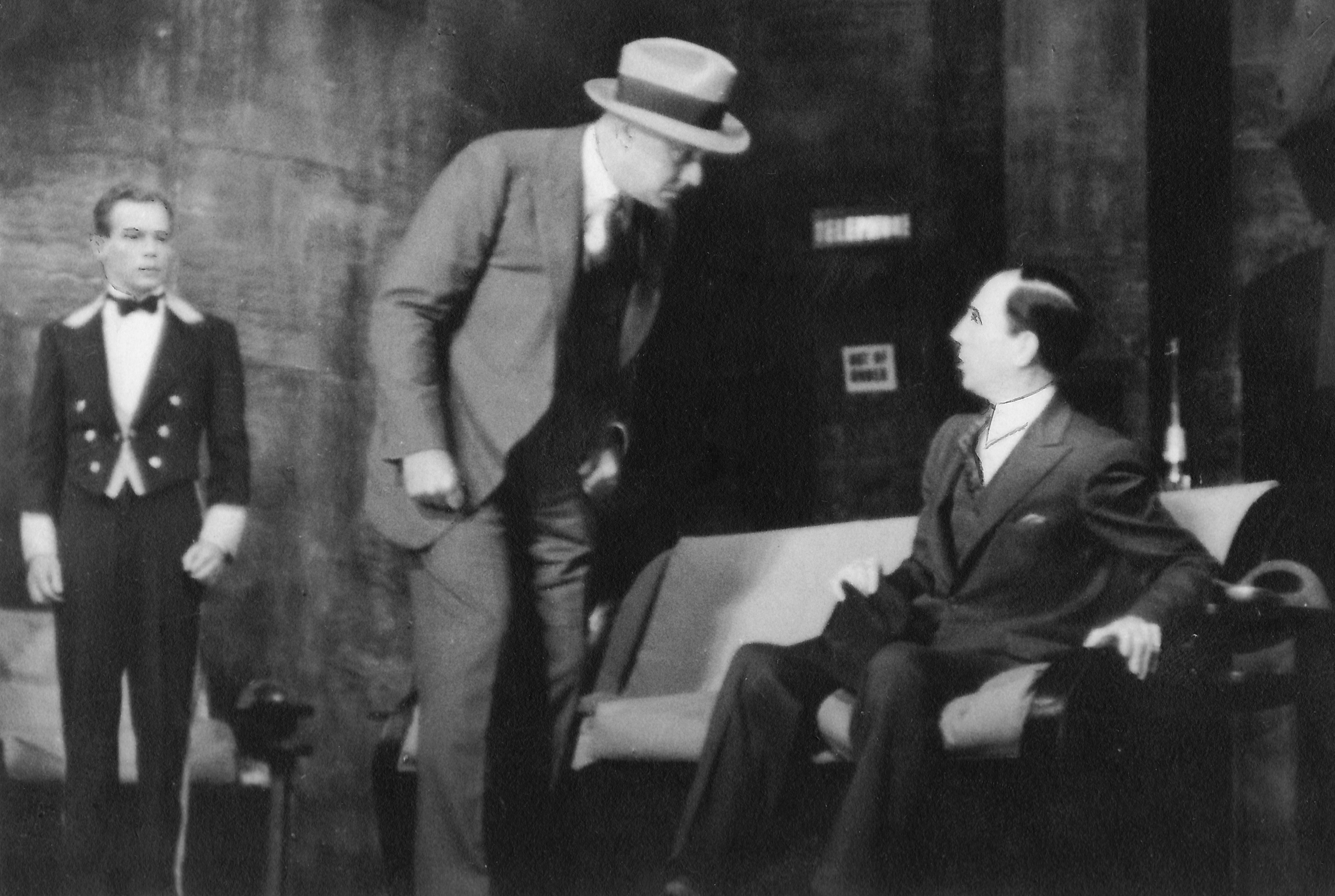
Robert Middlemass (center) as Captain Seaver of the New York police, grilling a suspect in Small Miracle (1934)

- Buddies (1919–20)
- For All of Us (1923–24)
- The Butter and Egg Man (1925–26)
- The Valiant (1926, one night on Broadway), first published in McClure's in 1921.
- Gambling (1929–30)
- Small Miracle (1934–35)

== Selected filmography ==
- Other Men's Daughters (1918) - Richard Ormsby
- Five Thousand an Hour (1918) - Ashley Loring
- The Winchester Woman (1919) - Alan Woodward
- Party Wire (1935) - Judge Stephenson
- Air Hawks (1935) - Martin Drewen
- The Awakening of Jim Burke (1935) - Bill Duke
- Unknown Woman (1935) - Hammacher
- The Black Room (1935) - The Prosecutor (uncredited)
- After the Dance (1935) - King
- Atlantic Adventure (1935) - Harry Van Dieman
- The Public Menace (1935) - Frentrup
- She Couldn't Take It (1935) - Desk Sergeant (uncredited)
- Grand Exit (1935) - Fire Chief Mulligan
- Crime and Punishment (1935) - Cop (uncredited)
- One Way Ticket (1935) - Bender
- Super Speed (1935) - Wilson Gale
- Too Tough to Kill (1935) - Hubbel
- If You Could Only Cook (1935) - Chief Inspector (uncredited)
- The Lone Wolf Returns (1935) - Chief of Detectives McGowan
- Two Against the World (1936) - Bertram C. Reynolds
- Dangerous Intrigue (1936) - Koenig (uncredited)
- Muss 'em Up (1936) - Inspector Brock
- You May Be Next (1936) - Dan McMahon
- Frankie and Johnny (1936) - Minor Role (uncredited)
- F-Man (1936) - Chief Cartwright
- Nobody's Fool (1936) - Sharkey (uncredited)
- A Son Comes Home (1936) - Sheriff
- Grand Jury (1936) - Police Chief Brady (uncredited)
- The Case of the Velvet Claws (1936) - Police Sgt. Wilbur Hoffman
- Cain and Mabel (1936) - Mr. George, Cafe Proprietor
- Hideaway Girl (1936) - Capt. Dixon
- Hats Off (1936) - Tex Connolly
- General Spanky (1936) - Overseer
- Guns of the Pecos (1937) - Judge L.F. Blake
- Trapped (1937) - Sol Rothert
- A Day at the Races (1937) - Sheriff
- The Last Train from Madrid (1937) - Militiaman (uncredited)
- Meet the Boyfriend (1937) - McGrath
- Charlie Chan on Broadway (1937) - Police Official (uncredited)
- Madame X (1937) - Prefect of Police (uncredited)
- Navy Blue and Gold (1937) - Academy Superintendent
- 45 Fathers (1937) - Lawyer Calhoun (uncredited)
- The Bad Man of Brimstone (1937) - Schurz - Jury Foreman (uncredited)
- Love Is a Headache (1938) - Police Commissioner (uncredited)
- Blondes at Work (1938) - Boylan - Editor
- Arsène Lupin Returns (1938) - Sergeant (uncredited)
- Men Are Such Fools (1938) - Elevator-Starter (uncredited)
- Highway Patrol (1938) - J.W. Brady
- I Am the Law (1938) - Moss Kitchell
- Spawn of the North (1938) - Davis (uncredited)
- Hold That Co-ed (1938) - Campaign Committeeman (uncredited)
- The Mad Miss Manton (1938) - District Attorney (uncredited)
- Tarnished Angel (1938) - Police Chief Thomas (uncredited)
- I Stand Accused (1938) - Norman L. Mitchell
- The Cowboy and the Lady (1938) - Newspaper Chief (uncredited)
- While New York Sleeps (1938) - James Sawyer
- Kentucky (1938) - Track Official
- Stand Up and Fight (1939) - Harkrider
- Idiot's Delight (1939) - Hospital Commandant (uncredited)
- Hotel Imperial (1939) - General Von Schwartzberg (uncredited)
- Maisie (1939) - Doctor (uncredited)
- Indianapolis Speedway (1939) - Edward Hart
- The Magnificent Fraud (1939) - Morales
- Coast Guard (1939) - Capt. Lyons
- Stanley and Livingstone (1939) - Carmichael (uncredited)
- Blackmail (1939) - Desk Sergeant (uncredited)
- Espionage Agent (1939) - Militant American Tourist (uncredited)
- The Arizona Kid (1939) - General Stark
- Mr. Smith Goes to Washington (1939) - 2nd Radio Announcer (uncredited)
- Blondie Brings Up Baby (1939) - Abner Cartwright
- The Amazing Mr. Williams (1939) - Police Commissioner (uncredited)
- Slightly Honorable (1939) - Sen. Berry
- Abe Lincoln in Illinois (1940) - Minor Role (uncredited)
- Little Old New York (1940) - Nicholas Roosevelt
- The Saint Takes Over (1940) - Captain Wade
- The Captain Is a Lady (1940) - Captain Peterson (uncredited)
- Pop Always Pays (1940) - Mr. Oberton
- Gold Rush Maisie (1940) - Charlie - Camp Owner (uncredited)
- Dulcy (1940) - The Real Schuyler Van Dyke (uncredited)
- The Great Plane Robbery (1940) - Manager (uncredited)
- The Man Who Wouldn't Talk (1940)
- Road to Zanzibar (1941) - Police inspector
- They Met in Argentina (1941) - George Hastings (uncredited)
- Lady Scarface (1941) - Police Capt. Lovell (uncredited)
- No Hands on the Clock (1941) - Police Chief Bates
- Torpedo Boat (1942) - Mr. Townsend
- Klondike Fury (1942) - Sam Armstrong
- The War Against Mrs. Hadley (1942) - Air Raid Warden (uncredited)
- Daring Young Man (1942) - Drummond
- The Payoff (1942) - Lester Norris
- Johnny Doughboy (1942) - V.J. (uncredited)
- Truck Busters (1943) - Landis
- Submarine Alert (1943) - Johnny's Father (uncredited)
- Bombardier (1943) - Officer (uncredited)
- The Black Raven (1943) - Tim Winfield
- Lady in the Death House (1944) - State's Attorney
- Gambler's Choice (1944) - Thomas J. Dennis (uncredited)
- Wilson (1944) - Lindley M. Garrison - Secretary of War (uncredited)
- An American Romance (1944) - Mr. Jarrett (uncredited)
- My Buddy (1944) - Judge (uncredited)
- Main Street After Dark (1945) - Detective (uncredited)
- A Sporting Chance (1945) - William Reardon
- Mama Loves Papa (1945) - The Mayor (uncredited)
- The Dolly Sisters (1945) - Oscar Hammerstein (uncredited)
- Hold That Blonde (1945) - Police Captain (uncredited)
- Masquerade in Mexico (1945) - Customs Official (uncredited)
- Suspense (1946) - Lead Woodsman (uncredited)
- The Trouble with Women (1947) - Pompus Regent (uncredited) (final film role)
