= Holworthy (surname) =

Holworthy is a surname. Notable people with this surname include:

- Arthur Holworthy (1897–1983), British military officer
- James Holworthy (1781–1841), British watercolor artist
- Lamiez Holworthy (born 1992), South African media personality and philanthropist
