= Harold Everett Porter =

American writer (1887–1936)

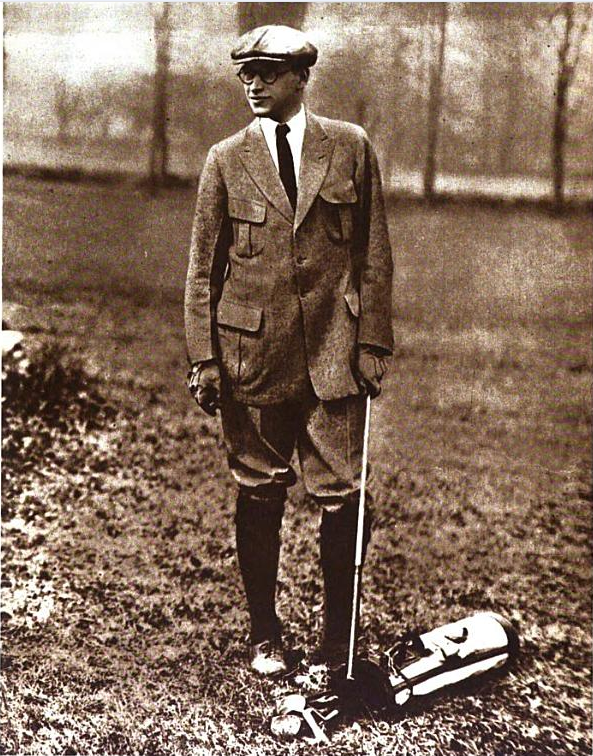
Porter in 1917

Harold Everett Porter (19 September 1887 – 21 June 1936) was an American writer. Under the pen name of Holworthy Hall he published plays, verse, novels and short stories. He took his pseudonym from the dormitory for first-year students where he stayed at Harvard University.

== Biography ==
Porter was born in Boston, Massachusetts. He was the son of Albert de Lance (D.) Porter, who was first a printer in Boston, and then a publisher in New York City as owner of the A. D. Porter Co. His mother, Louella née Root, was born in Ohio and raised in Massachusetts.

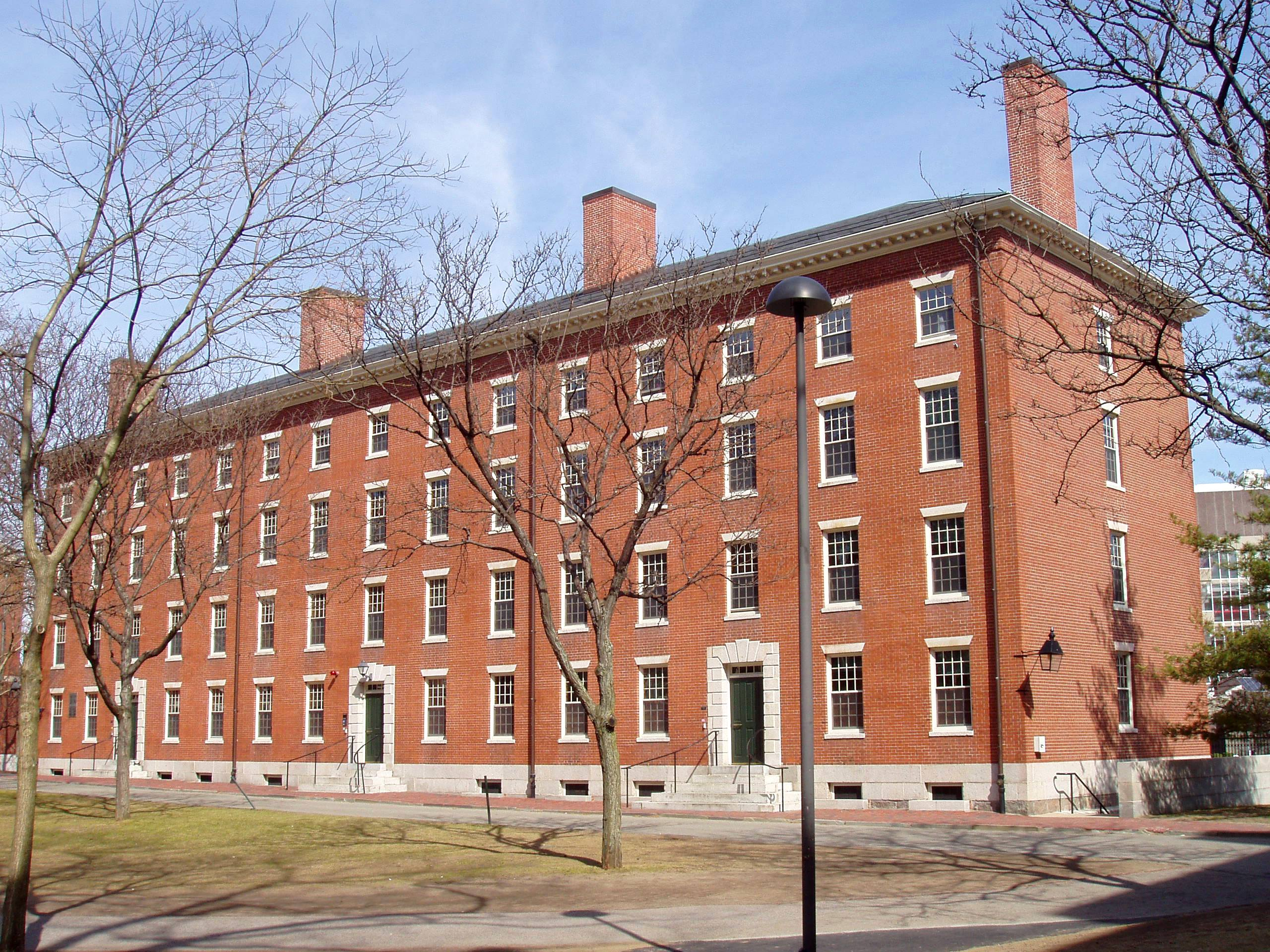
Holworthy Hall, Harvard University

He attended Harvard College winning a scholarship in the year 1906–1907. He was on the lacrosse team in 1906–1907.

Porter was the editor of the Harvard Lampoon from 1906 to 1909 and an editor of the Harvard Advocate, the campus literary magazine, from 1907 to 1909.

He shared Room 13 in Holworthy Hall, the freshman's dormitory, with John Mansfield Groton, next door to Robert Middlemass (with whom he collaborated on The Valiant) and the artist Julian Ellsworth Garnsey in Room 14.

After graduating in 1909 he worked at the Boston publisher Little, Brown & Co., and then with his father's firm at the A.D. Porter Company. The firm published a monthly magazine, The Housewife, which he edited. His first short story under the pseudonym Holworthy Hall was printed in The Saturday Evening Post, and he continued to write short stories for the rest of his life.

In 1916, he was named the president of the A. D. Porter Company.

His short story "The Same Old Christmas Story" appeared in the 1,000th edition (or so) of the Harvard Advocate in May 1916. He was characterised in a review in the rival Harvard Crimson as a "noble graduate of 1907, with a bank account, a tender heart and too much leisure."

During World War I he served in the office of the Secretary of War in Washington, D.C., working in the Military Intelligence Division, as a first lieutenant and then captain. He continued to publish stories, and was demobilized as a major in the Officer Reserve Corps. His two non-fiction books date from this period.

He joined the Skaneateles Country Club in 1920. He moved to France to escape prohibition in the US, living in Paris and Cannes, in a house overlooking the Mediterranean. Playing golf was a particular passion, and he wrote less and less. His marriage ended in divorce, and he returned to the US alone to live in Connecticut. He continued to write stories and died in Torrington of pneumonia, aged 48.

== Personal life ==
In 1911 he married Marian 'Marnie' Heffron of Syracuse, New York. She was the daughter of Dr. John Lorenzo Heffron, the dean of the School of Medicine at Syracuse University. Heffron retired in June 1922 after 40 years' connection with the teaching staff of the medical school, 15 of them as dean.

After their separation/divorce she went back to the States with their three children, and became involved (as Mrs. Harold Everett Porter) with luncheons and dinners for the Boston Symphony Orchestra at the Copley-Plaza Hotel.

== Selected bibliography ==
Poems

- "Epithalamium" (1913, Life magazine)
- "Opera Porteri" (1913, Life magazine)

Short stories

- "The Rôle of Vision" (1910, The Scrap Book)
- "My next imitation" (1913) (Note: Includes "The Same Old Christmas Story", reprinted in the Harvard Advocate, May 1916. "It reads like that story of Bunner's, where the brave little boy sells the gold brick to a kind old gentleman, and thus provides a Christmas for the family of the unsuccessful bunco steerer.") Imitations of/tributes to other writers, starting with Walt Whitman and Stephen Leacock.
- "The Gilded Mean" (1914), published in The Smart Set: A Magazine of Cleverness. (April 1914) Vol. 42, No. 3, pp. 91–96. Also given away as miniature book in packs of Sovereign cigarettes. The Smart Set was edited by H. L. Mencken from 1914 to 1923.
- Pepper (1915), collection of college stories
- Paprika (1916), more college tales
- Dormie One: and other golf stories (1917)

Novels

- Henry of Navarre, Ohio (1914)
- What He Least Expected (1917)
- The Man Nobody Knew (1919)
- The Six Best Cellars (1919) (with Hugh McNair Kahler). A satire of prohibition. Filmed in 1920 as The Six Best Cellars by Famous Players Lasky.
- Egan (1920)
- Rope (1922)
- Colossus (1930), with a dedication to his friend and literary agent, Harold Ober (still in copyright in 2016, searchable text only)

Plays

- The Valiant (1921) a one-act play (with Robert Middlemass, Harvard classmate), appeared in McClure's magazine
  - The Valiant (1929 film), El valien (1930 film), The Man Who Wouldn't Talk (1940 film), and three TV movies
- The Duke and the Dices (1929) (still in copyright in 2016, searchable text only)

Non-fiction

- The History of the Liberty Engine (1918) (with William Rose Benét and Warner W. Kent) (Note: This document, cited as MS (manuscript) and containing at least 119 pages, held at the U.S. Air Force Museum, Wright-Patterson Air Force Base, Ohio, is referenced several times in Dickey, Philip S. III (1968). "The Liberty Engine 1918–1942" (PDF). Smithsonian Annals of Flight. 1 (3) (5th printing, 1978 ed.).)
- Aerial Observation: The Airplane Observer, The Balloon Observer and the Army Corps Pilot (1921)

== Light verse ==
Porter was evidently a great lover of classical music, and the following lines (which originally appeared in Life magazine in 1913) evoke memories of his favourite operas, singers and musicians.

Opera Porteri

O carmen jadlowker dalmorès
O lucia sextetta bizet;
O dippel caruso dolores,
Gioconda, o andré-caplet.

O conti, o eames tetrazzini,
O scotti mascagni farrar.
O gadski busoni puccini,
Calvé constantino, maquarre.

Ah, verdi, pagliacc' trovatore,
Aida fremstad meyerbeer;
Pol plançon and that tells the story,
The opera season is here.
