= Holworthy Hall =

Dormitory for Harvard College students

Coordinates: 42.37549°N 71.11726°W

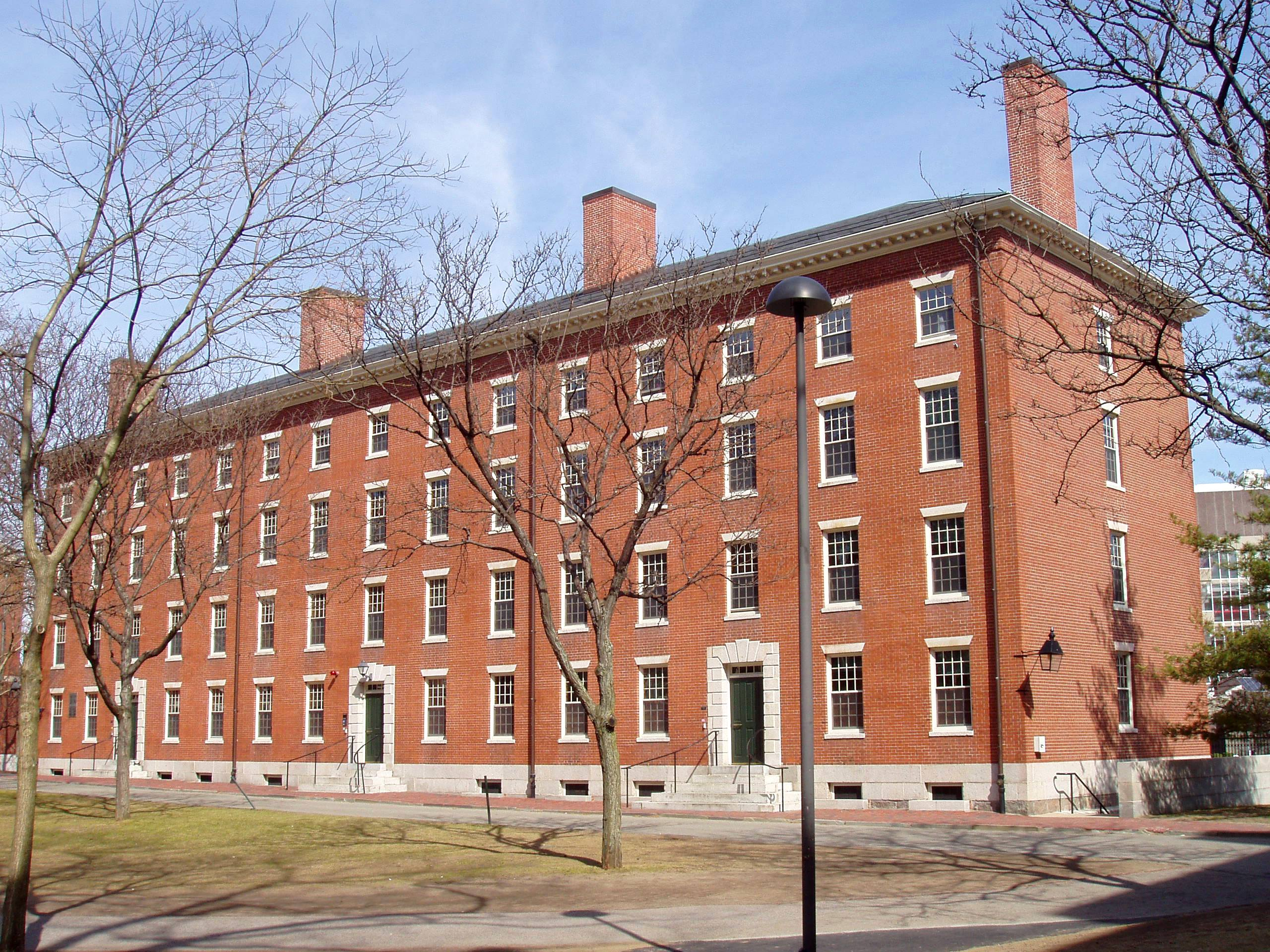
A view of Holworthy from Harvard Yard

Holworthy Hall, in Harvard Yard, Cambridge, Massachusetts, is a historic dormitory for first-year students at Harvard College.

== History ==
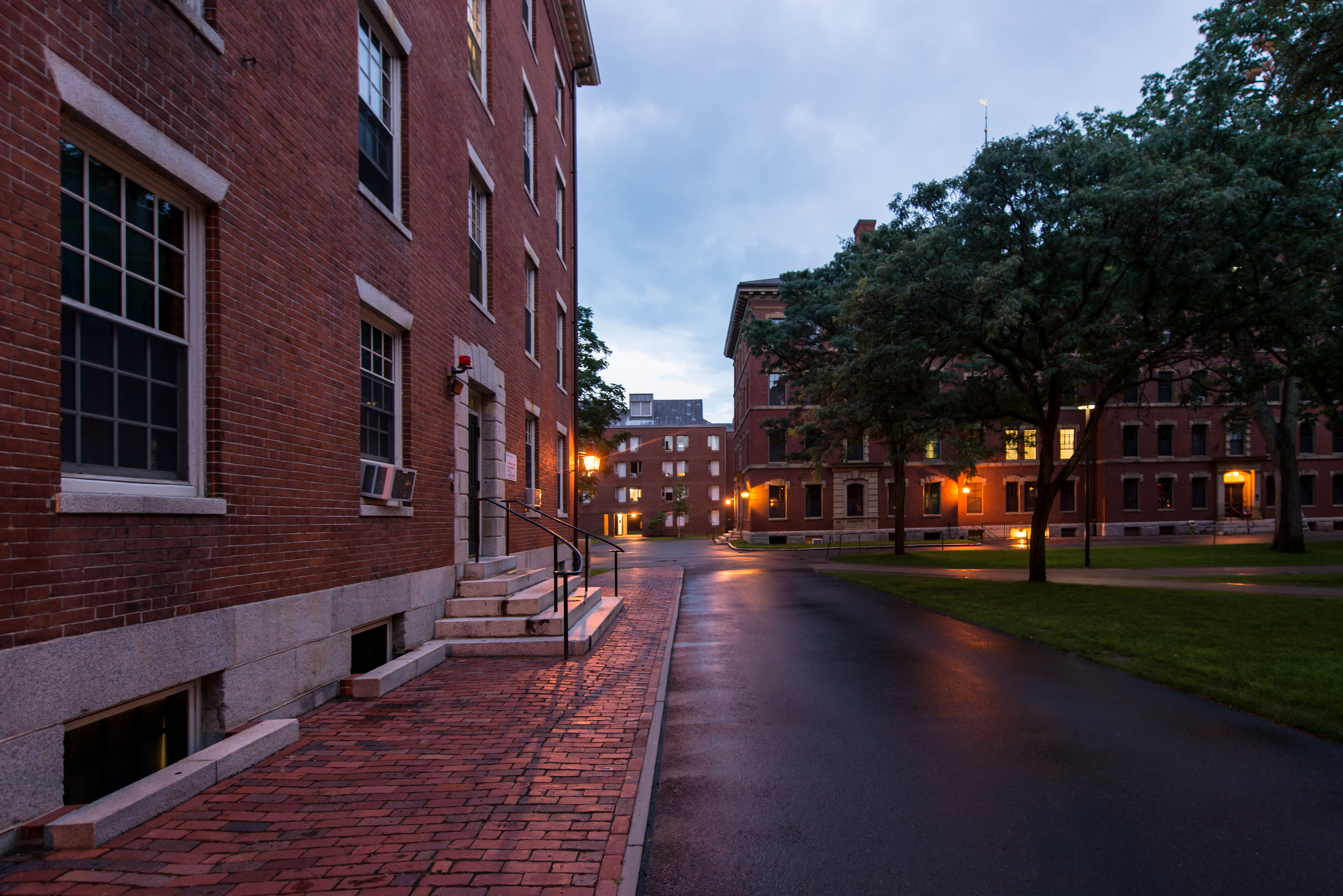
the entryway of Holworthy East

Holworthy was named in 1812 in honor of a wealthy English merchant, Sir Matthew Holworthy, who died in 1678 having bequeathed £1,000 to Harvard — then the largest donation in the college's history — "for the promotion of learning and the promulgation of the Gospel" in Cambridge. When it opened on August 18, 1812, then-President John Thornton Kirkland of Harvard referred to it as "Holworthy College." It did not have indoor plumbing; for almost a century, students had to go outside to use the college's pump. Rent was $26 per year.

Until 1860, Room 24 served as the library of Harvard's chapter of Phi Beta Kappa society and also housed the librarian, who kept the chapter's several hundred books in his study closet.

The dorm was originally used for all classes, as evidenced by famous residents like Thomas Bulfinch and Horatio Alger being housed in it multiple times, but was predominantly used for housing seniors during its early existence. By the turn of the 20th century, the senior classes expressed a desire to formally make the oldest Yard buildings — first Holworthy, then Hollis and Stoughton — their own and petitioned the college administration to make Holworthy a senior-only dormitory. By the hundredth anniversary of the dorm in 1912, about 1,300 men had lived in Holworthy.

By 1904, Holworthy was fully a senior dorm. Although it was not considered as fashionable as some of the newer dorms, Holworthy and its neighbors on the Yard became the center of student life on campus. It also became known for housing many of the most prominent students within the college's social life, including athletic team captains and managers, Lampoon presidents (including Robert Benchley '12, who spoke at Holworthy's centennial dinner), Advocate presidents, and the leaders of the college's various musical groups. By the 1910s, The New York Times reported that Holworthy's "record of men afterward illustrious who have occupied its rooms is probably longer than any similar list possessed by any other college building," making it the "pet" dorm of seniors.

With the other freshman dormitories in the Yard, Holworthy joined the Harvard–Yale sister colleges arrangement in 2005, when Harvard's freshman dormitories — which are not otherwise formally affiliated with Harvard's residential houses — became associated with Harvard houses and their counterparts among Yale University's residential colleges. Holworthy was paired with Hollis Hall to become part of Winthrop House's affiliation with Davenport College at Yale.

== Past residents ==
Holworthy is notable for having been the freshman dorm of several writers and producers of The Simpsons who graduated in the 1980s — Al Jean '81, Bill Oakley '88, Conan O'Brien '85, and Mike Reiss '81. O'Brien referenced his time in Holworthy during his Class Day speech to the Harvard Class of 2000.

- Henry Adams, journalist and novelist, Room 5
- James Barr Ames, former Harvard Law School dean, Rooms 14 and 20
- Horatio Alger, novelist, Rooms 07, 18, and 24
- George Bancroft, statesman and historian, Room 24
- Robert Benchley, humorist and actor, Room 23
- Thomas Bulfinch, writer and mythographer, Rooms 09 and 16
- Joseph Hodges Choate, lawyer and diplomat, Room 21
- William Gardner Choate, judge and Choate School founder, Room 21
- Adam Clymer, journalist, Room 18
- Richard Henry Dana Jr., lawyer and politician, Room 13
- Charles William Eliot, former Harvard president, Room 11
- Robert Grant, novelist, Room 9
- Christian Herter, politician, Room 15
- David Halberstam, journalist, Room 19
- Holworthy Hall, pseudonym of writer H. E. Porter, editor of Lampoon, Room 13
- Steve Hely, television writer, Room 21
- Al Jean, television writer and producer, Room 17
- Edward Lawrence Logan, politician and namesake of Boston Logan International Airport, Room 6
- Samuel Longfellow, clergyman, Room 14
- Percival Lowell, astronomer and businessman, Room 21
- Edward Sandford Martin, Lampoon co-founder and Life founder, Room 4
- James Murdoch, media executive, Room 7
- B. J. Novak, actor and television writer, Room 10
- Bill Oakley, television writer and producer, Room 15
- Conan O'Brien, talk show host and comedy writer, Room 16
- Deval Patrick, politician
- Wendell Phillips, abolitionist and orator, Room 24
- Josiah Quincy Jr., politician, Room 7
- Mike Reiss, television writer and producer, Room 20
- William E. Russell, politician, Room 7
- Steven V. Roberts, journalist, Room 14
- Charles Sumner, politician, Room 23
- Pablo Torre, sportswriter, Room 18
- Luis Ubiñas, Ford Foundation president, Room 16
- Cornel West, philosopher and activist, Room 8
- Robert Wrenn, Hall of Fame tennis player, Room 3
- Jeffrey Zucker, media executive, Room 7
- Pete Buttigieg, politician
- Priscilla Chan, philanthropist and pediatrician, Room 24
