= The Patriot (1928 film) =

1928 film directed by Ernst Lubitsch

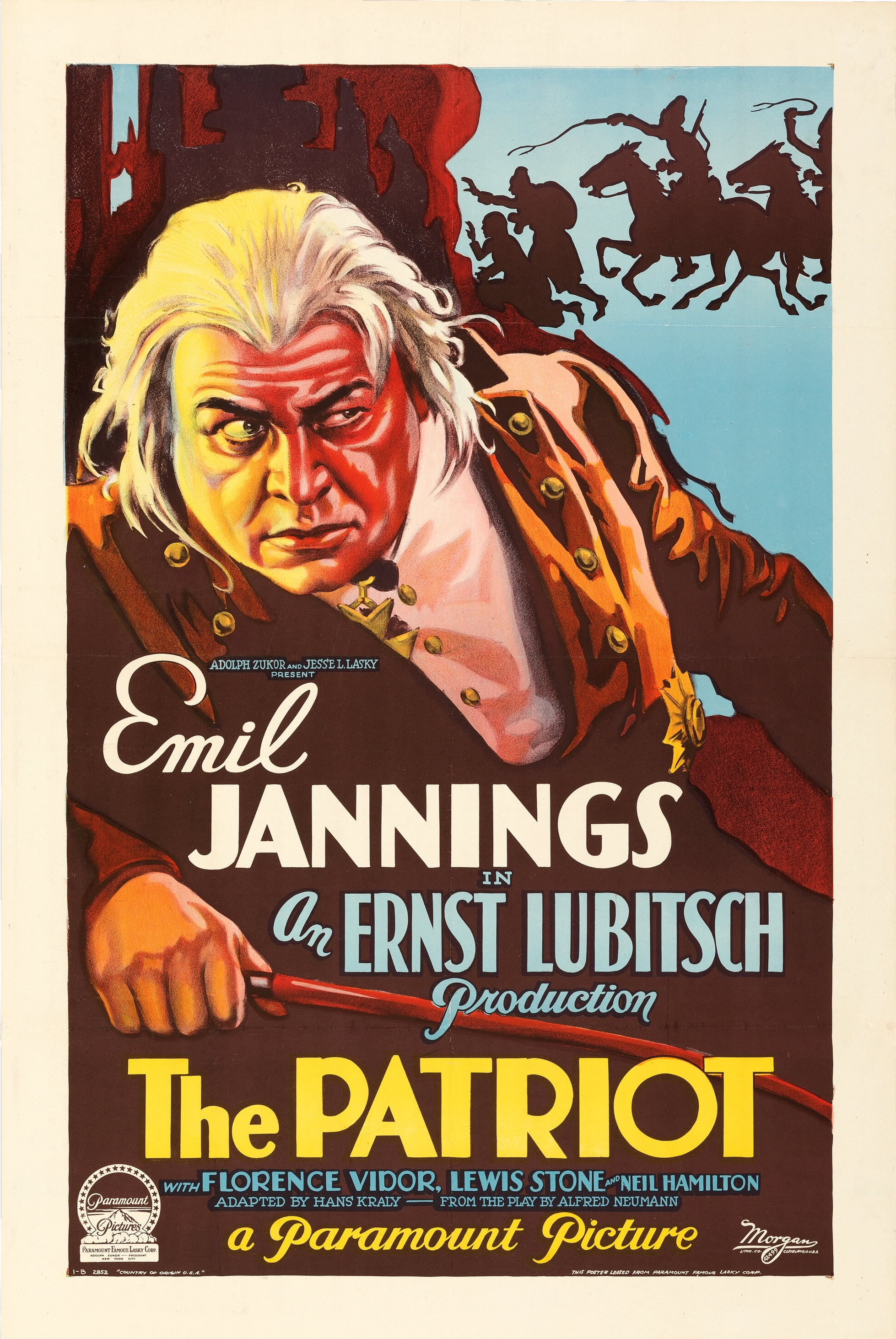
- Film poster
- Directed by: Ernst Lubitsch
- Written by: Hanns Kräly; Alfred Neumann (Novel); Ashley Dukes (Play); Dmitry Merezhkovsky (Play)
- Starring: Emil Jannings; Florence Vidor; Lewis Stone; Neil Hamilton
- Cinematography: Bert Glennon
- Edited by: Ernst Lubitsch
- Music by: Max Bergunker
- Distributed by: Paramount Pictures
- Release date: August 17, 1928
- Running time: 113 minutes (12 reels)
- Country: United States
- Languages: Sound (Part-Talkie); English Intertitles
- Budget: $1 million

The Patriot is a 1928 American semi-biographical sound part-talkie film that was directed by Ernst Lubitsch and released by Paramount Pictures. This was Paramount's first feature with spoken dialogue. It also had synchronized music and sound effects, depicting the story of Emperor Paul I of Russia. The plot revolves around Count Pahlen's plot to remove the mad Tsar from the throne, eventually leading to the Tsar's death. The film stars Emil Jannings, Florence Vidor, and Lewis Stone.

The film won the Academy Award for Best Writing and was nominated in several other categories. However, only fragments of the film remain, with no complete copy found to date.

== Plot ==
In Imperial Russia, Tsar Paul I rules through fear, paranoia, and erratic cruelty. A tyrant haunted by dread, Paul lives in constant suspicion of everyone around him, believing that he, like some of his ancestors, is doomed to be assassinated. Despite his mistrustful nature, he places intermittent trust in one man: Count Pahlen, his Prime Minister. Pahlen skillfully manages the emperor like a child, maintaining an unassailable political position.

Privately, Pahlen is in love with Countess Ostermann, the wife of a military officer. Their affair is interrupted when her husband unexpectedly returns. As he picks up one of Pahlen's boots to hurl it out the window in a rage, he is shot and killed by a Cossack guard—one of the Tsar's decrees forbids anyone from being visible at a window during his passage.

While Pahlen is deeply loyal to Russia, he is also tormented by the suffering Paul inflicts on the nation. Torn between duty and patriotism, he determines to bring about the Tsar's downfall. He recruits Stephan, a soldier recently punished by Paul for minor uniform violations, promising him vengeance and assigning him as his bodyguard.

At St. Michael's Castle, Paul obsesses over trivialities like the number of gaiter buttons, while foreign and domestic affairs languish. Meanwhile, Pahlen begins to rally conspirators at court. He appeals to Crown Prince Alexander, an idealist who dreams of a better Russia. But when the prince refuses to support treason, Pahlen reports him to Paul as a traitor, knowing full well the emperor already resents the popularity of his own son. Paul immediately places Alexander under arrest.

With the conspiracy in motion, Pahlen devises a plan: Paul will be pressured to abdicate, and if he refuses, he will be assassinated. But Paul suddenly announces he is leaving the city with his mistress, Mademoiselle Lapoukhine, derailing the carefully timed plot.

To keep Paul in the capital, Pahlen shows him a snuff box with a hidden portrait of Countess Ostermann. Obsessed, Paul cancels his trip and demands to meet the Countess. Pahlen orchestrates the meeting and deliberately leaves the two alone. Paul clumsily propositions her. Betrayed and disgusted, the Countess reveals Pahlen's plot to assassinate him.

Summoning Pahlen, Paul demands an explanation. Calmly, Pahlen claims he infiltrated the conspiracy to expose the plotters. He offers his life in exchange for the Tsar's trust. Satisfied, Paul retires to his chambers.

That night, the assassination proceeds. As the Tsar lies in uneasy sleep, conspirators enter his room. Paul pleads with them: “I am the Tsar by Divine Right!”—but his words delay, not deter. From behind, Stephan emerges and murders the Tsar.

Outside, bells toll and the people celebrate the rise of the new emperor. In his study, Pahlen awaits the cost of his actions. Stephan appears with a pistol. As the clock strikes the hour, a shot rings out—Pahlen is mortally wounded.

The Countess arrives too late. Cradled in her arms, Pahlen declares with his final breath: “I have been a bad friend and lover—but I have been a ‘Patriot’.”

== Cast ==
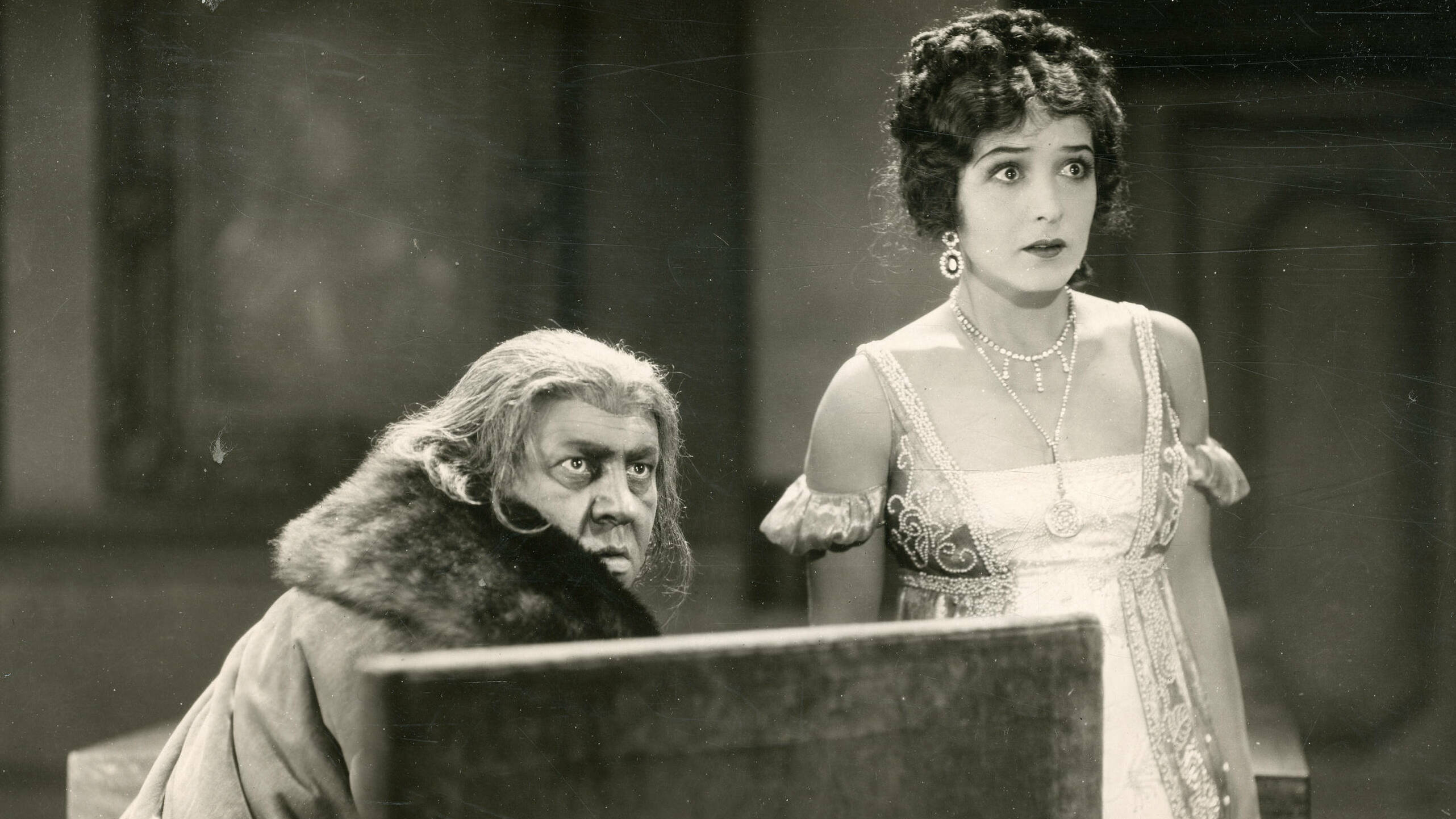
Emil Jannings and Florence Vidor

- Emil Jannings as Tsar Paul I
- Florence Vidor as Countess Ostermann
- Lewis Stone as Count Pahlen
- Vera Voronina as Mademoiselle Lapoukhine
- Neil Hamilton as Crown Prince Alexander
- Harry Cording as Stefan

Tullio Carminati and Carmencita Johnson appear uncredited in this movie.

== Music ==
The musical score for the film was composed by Max Bergunker, Gerard Carbonara and Domenico Savino.

== Production ==
=== Writing ===
The film was written by Hanns Kräly; it is an adaptation of two plays: Paul I by Dmitry Merezhkovsky and The Patriot by Ashley Dukes (based on the novel Der Patriot by Alfred Neumann). The Dukes play was performed on Broadway in January 1928. John Gielgud made his Broadway debut in that play.

== Reception ==
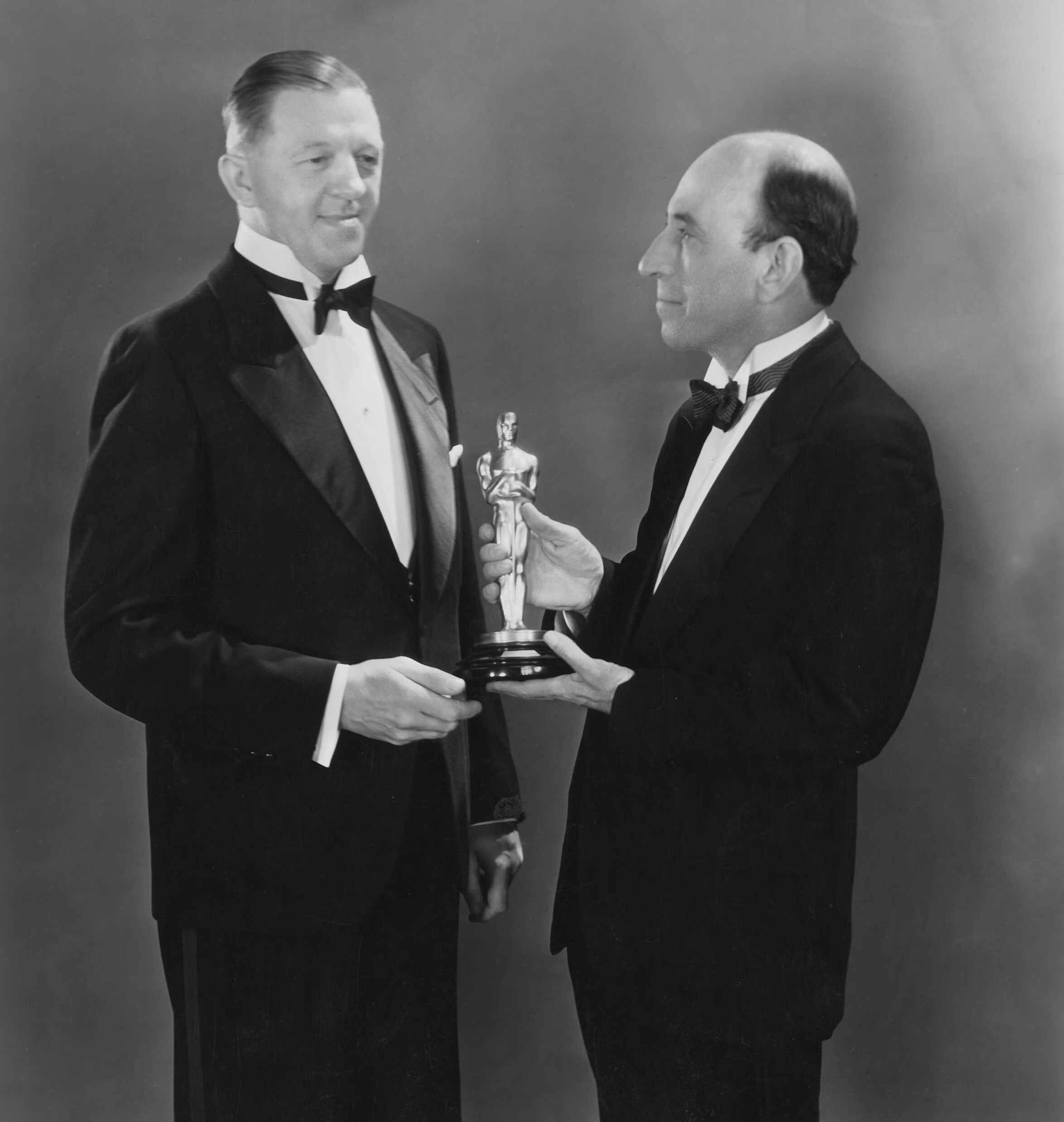
Writer Hanns Kräly (left) won the Academy Award for Best Writing for The Patriot.

=== Awards ===
It won the Academy Award for Best Writing and was nominated for Best Picture, Best Director, Best Actor (Lewis Stone) and Best Art Direction. It was the last Part-talkie that was nominated for Best Picture.

== Remake ==
The film was remade in France in 1938 with the same title.

== Preservation status ==
Only pieces of this film are left, including trailers. The UCLA Film and Television Archive is in possession of 2500 feet of footage (out of 10,000), and one reel was found in Portugal, but to date no complete copy has been located.

It is the only Best Picture Academy Award nominee for which no complete or near-complete copy has been found.

== See also ==
- List of lost films
- List of early sound feature films (1926–1929)
